= List of sword-and-sorcery films =

Sword and sorcery is a literary genre that emerged from the early 20th century by blending elements from the Adventure and Horror genres with major influences from early archeology and theosophy, as well as folklore and mythology, often written in a gothic literature fashion with heavy themes of existentialism, social critiques, questions about agency, and expressions of free will. It is a sub-genre of weird fiction, and the parent of fantasy. It is also known for its utilization of eastern story telling techniques and religious story telling concepts such as Divine intervention, often employing the Deus Ex Machina trope.

Violent and controversial, the genre has experienced small bubbles of popularity. This genre is marked by morally grey characters, romance subplots, and an elevation or appreciation of primitive instinct or emotion as superior to civilization and/or law. These characters typically face interpersonal trials as they venture out to fight a mythical or supernatural evil in the pursuit of self-discovery or self-enrichment.

This genre was created by the author Robert E. Howard in 1926 with his King Kull story The Shadow Kingdom. Howard's characters Conan the Barbarian and Solomon Kane would go on to become the basis for this genre. It received its official name much later, in 1961, when Micheal Moorcock and Fritz Leiber had a public discussion through fanzines, deciding that there must be "a name for the sort of fantasy-adventure story written by Robert E. Howard."

This list will attempt to chronicle all films related to or inspired by the Sword and Sorcery genre. Due to the nature of film as being quite different from literature, there is substantial variation even in direct adaptions of S&S stories to the screen. There is considerable crossover with the screen presence of this genre and other subgenres of heroic fantasy.

In film, this genre is commonly referred to by the hybrid name supernatural action-adventure.

== List of films (chronological) ==
Film	Year	Anim	Ref.
Die Nibelungen	1924		
The Wizard of Oz	1939		
Kashchey the Deathless	1941		
The Magic Sword	1950		
Prince Valiant	1954		
Ilya Muromets	1956		
The 7th Voyage of Sinbad	1958		
Sleeping Beauty	1959	Y	
Hercules Unchained	1959		
Hercules in the Haunted World	1962		
Jack the Giant Killer	1962		
The Magic Sword	1962		
Jason and the Argonauts	1963		
Hercules the Avenger	1965		
Treasure of the Petrified Forest	1965		
The Great Adventure of Horus, Prince of the Sun	1968	Y	
Ruslan and Ludmila	1972		
The Golden Voyage of Sinbad	1973		
Sinbad and the Eye of the Tiger	1977		
Wizards	1977	Y	
Star Wars	1977		
Jabberwocky	1977		
The Hobbit	1977	Y	
The Lord of the Rings	1978	Y	
Warlords of Atlantis	1978		
Black Angel	1980		
The Empire Strikes Back	1980		
Hawk the Slayer	1980		
The Return of the King	1980	Y	
Clash of the Titans	1981		
Dragonslayer	1981		
Excalibur	1981		
The Archer	1982		
Ator l'invincibile	1982		
The Sword of the Barbarians	1982		
The Beastmaster	1982		
Conan the Barbarian	1982		
The Flight of Dragons	1982	Y	
The Last Unicorn	1982	Y	
Gunan, King of the Barbarians	1982		
Hero	1982		
The Sword and the Sorcerer	1982		
Sorceress	1982		
Conquest	1983		
Ironmaster	1983		
Thor the Conqueror	1983		
Return of the Jedi	1983		
Deathstalker	1983		
Fire and Ice	1983	Y	
Hearts and Armour	1983		
Hercules	1983		
Hundra	1983		
Krull	1983		
The Throne of Fire	1983		
Ator 2 - L'invincibile Orion	1983		
Indiana Jones and the Temple of Doom	1984		
Conan the Destroyer	1984		
The Devil's Sword	1984		
The NeverEnding Story	1984		
Sword of the Valiant	1984		
The Warrior and the Sorceress	1984		
Barbarian Queen	1985		
Return to Oz	1985		
The Black Cauldron	1985	Y	
Ladyhawke	1985		
Legend	1985		
Red Sonja	1985		
Starchaser: The Legend of Orin	1985		
Vampire Hunter D (1985 film)	1985	Y	
Amazons	1986		
Highlander	1986		
The Barbarians	1987		
Deathstalker II	1987		
Mio in the Land of Faraway	1987		
Stormquest	1987		
Iron Warrior	1987		
Masters of the Universe	1987		
The Princess Bride	1987		
Deathstalker III	1988		
Willow	1988		
Wizards of the Lost Kingdom II	1989		
Erik the Viking	1989		
Sinbad of the Seven Seas	1989		
The NeverEnding Story II: The Next Chapter	1990		
Quest for the Mighty Sword	1990		
Barbarian Queen II: The Empress Strikes Back	1990		
Beastmaster 2: Through the Portal of Time	1991		
Deathstalker IV: Match of Titans	1991		
Subspecies	1991		
Wizards of the Demon Sword	1991		
Army of Darkness	1992		
Quest of the Delta Knights	1993		
Highlander III: The Sorcerer	1994		
The NeverEnding Story III	1994		
Yamato Takeru	1994		
First Knight	1995		
Lord of Illusions	1995		
Mortal Kombat	1995		
Beastmaster III: The Eye of Braxus	1996		
Dragonheart	1996		
Kull the Conqueror	1997		
Snow White: A Tale of Terror	1997		
Mortal Kombat Annihilation	1997		
Wishmaster	1997		
Princess Mononoke	1997	Y	
Berserk	1997	Y	
Hellsing	1997	Y	
Small Soldiers	1998		
Kirikou and the Sorceress	1998	Y	
Wishmaster 2: Evil Never Dies	1999		
The 13th Warrior	1999		
Dungeons and Dragons	2000		
Dragonheart: A New Beginning	2000		
Demonicus	2001		
The Hexer	2001		
Wishmaster 3: Beyond the Gates of Hell	2001		
The Scorpion King	2002		
Wishmaster: The Prophecy Fulfilled	2002		
Ariana's Quest	2002		
Barbarian	2003		
Dark Kingdom: The Dragon King	2004		
Van Helsing	2004		
Beowulf & Grendel	2005		
BloodRayne	2005		
Wolfhound	2006		
Hellsing Ultimate	2006	Y	
Beowulf	2007		
Claymore	2007	Y	
In the Name of the King	2007		
The Golden Compass	2007		
The Scorpion King 2: Rise of a Warrior	2008		
The Spiderwick Chronicles	2008		
The Pagan Queen	2009		
Solomon Kane	2009		
9 (2009 animated film)	2009	Y	
Tales of an Ancient Empire	2010		
How to Train Your Dragon	2010	Y	
Tangled	2010	Y	
Conan the Barbarian	2011		
In the Name of the King 2: Two Worlds	2011		
Ronal the Barbarian	2011	Y	
Priest	2011		
Your Highness	2011		
Season of the Witch	2011		
The Scorpion King 3: Battle for Redemption	2012		
Sword Art Online	2012	Y	
Gallowwalkers	2012		
Witchslayer Gretl	2012		
Epic	2013	Y	
Gåten Ragnarok	2013		
Hansel and Gretel: Witch Hunters	2013		
Hansel & Gretel: Warriors of Witchcraft	2013		
Seventh Son	2014		
Viy	2014		
Mythica: A Quest for Heroes	2014		
Dudes & Dragons	2015		
The Scorpion King 4: Quest for Power	2015		
Overlord	2015	Y	
The Last Witch Hunter	2015		
Dragonheart 3: The Sorcerer's Curse	2015		
Mythica: The Darkspore	2015		
Mythica: The Necromancer	2015		
Mythica: The Iron Crown	2016		
Gods of Egypt	2016		
Mythica: The Godslayer	2016		
Dragonheart: Battle for the Heartfire	2017		
The Scorpion King: Book of Souls	2018		
The Stolen Princess	2018	Y	
Dragon Kingdom	2018		
Dragonheart: Vengeance	2020		
Jiang Ziya	2020	Y	
Onward	2020		
Mortal Kombat Legends: Scorpion's Revenge	2020	Y	
The Spine of Night	2021		
The Green Knight	2021		
The Northman	2022		
Willow	2022		
Dungeons & Dragons: Honor Among Thieves	2023		
Mythica: Stormbound	2024		
The Slave and the Sorcerer	2024		
Red Sonja	2025		
Deathstalker	2025		
Masters of the Universe	2026		
Wildwood	2026	Y	

== See also ==
- Category:Sword-and-sandal films
- Category:Sword and sorcery anime and manga
- List of high fantasy films and TV series
- Adventure fiction
- Adventure film
- Lists of adventure films
- Peplum (film genre)
