= Deathstalker II =

1987 film by Jim Wynorski

- Theatrical release poster by Boris Vallejo
- Directed by: Jim Wynorski
- Screenplay by: Neil Ruttenberg
- Story by: Jim Wynorski and Neil Ruttenberg
- Produced by: Frank Isaac Jr.
- Starring: John Terlesky; Monique Gabrielle; John LaZar; Toni Naples
- Cinematography: Leonardo Rodríguez Solís
- Edited by: Steve Barnett
- Music by: Chuck Cirino
- Production companies: Aries Films International (Aries Cinematográfica Argentina); New Horizon Picture Corp
- Distributed by: Concorde Pictures
- Release date: 12 September 1987 (Japan)
- Running time: 85 minutes
- Countries: Argentina; United States
- Language: English

Deathstalker II is a 1987 sword and sorcery film directed by Jim Wynorski and written by Neil Ruttenberg. A sequel to 1983's Deathstalker, it the second installment in the Deathstalker film series. It stars John Terlesky who replaced Rick Hill in the title role. The story follows a princess who has been deposed and replaced by her evil clone. She poses as a seer while trying to reclaim her kingdom with the help of the warrior known as Deathstalker.

Owing to its low-cost production and perceived self-awareness, director Wynorski called the film an "anachronistic comedy of sorts." Deathstalker II was the last sword and sorcery movie that Roger Corman produced in Argentina during the 1980s.

== Plot ==
Princess Evie of the Jzafir kingdom is possessed by the sorcerer Jerak, who creates an evil clone of Evie. Through the clone, Jerak and his voluptuous and dangerous ally, Sultana, rule over Jzafir. The real Evie escapes Jerak's control, and posing as Reena the Seer she enlists the aid of the renowned hero Deathstalker. Together they fight against the forces of evil to take back Evie's kingdom.

== Cast ==
- John Terlesky as Deathstalker
- Monique Gabrielle as Reena the Seer / Princess Evie
- John LaZar as Jarek the Sorcerer
- Toni Naples as Sultana
- María Socas as Amazon queen
- Marcos Woinsky as pirate
- Dee Booher as Amazon champion wrestler Gorgo (credited as Queen Kong)
- Jacques Arndt as high priest (credited as Jake Arnt)
- Carina Davi as young Amazon
- Jim Wynorski as dying soldier (credited as Arch Stanton)
- Douglas Mortimer as man in black
- Maria Luisa Carnivani as woman guard
- Leo Nichols as pirate hitman 1
- Frank Sisty as pirate hitman 2
- Red Sands as pirate hitman 3
- Dan Savio as pirate hitman 4
- William Feldman as pirate hitman 5
- Nick Sardansky as Evie's victim

== Production ==
=== Development ===
Roger Corman had a deal to make several sword and sorcery films in Argentina in a co-production deal with Aries Cinematográfica Argentina, of which Deathstalker II was the last. Corman asked Jim Wynorski, who had just made Chopping Mall (1986) for Corman, to direct it. Wynorski said Corman was upset that he did not get the chance to produce Conan the Barbarian (1982): "He should have done Conan, but he didn’t, someone else did it and he said 'I’m gonna copy it', so that’s what he did."

=== Casting ===
Wynorski cast several actors he had worked with before, including John Terlesky. Terlesky was dating Monique Gabrielle at the time, and he had also dated Toni Naples, and both were chosen for the cast. Wynorski also hired John LaZar because he had been in Beyond the Valley of the Dolls (1970).

Wynorski described working with Maria Socas, who had already starred in The Warrior and the Sorceress (1984)—the second sword and sorcery film Corman produced in Argentina—the following way: "Maria Socas was/is a very sweet person, she was trying to do the [Amazon queen] role serious, and finally I just said, 'play it serious and we’ll do comedy around you'."

Monique Gabrielle later described the film as her favorite:

It was a very difficult shoot, in a way, because we were shooting in Argentina and our script had a lot of stunts that couldn't be done with the limitations they had down there. It wasn't safe and there were a lot of problems. I almost got dropped into a pot of water, which, luckily, wasn't boiling (it was supposed to be). But, besides all that, it was really my favorite because I loved the role I played. I got to play dual characters.

Wynorski said "it took a lot from me" to get Gabrielle to play comedy: "She had more apogee for playing the evil queen, but I said 'you have to play yourself', which is very sweet, and 'you have to play [it] as a funny, you know, waif', and she did, she did a good job."

=== Writing ===
The script for Deathstalker II was written by Neil Ruttenberg with the help of Wynorski.

Wynorski explained: "We kinda did our version of It Happened One Night." He wrote two parts for Monique Gabrielle "because it gave me an extra person, I needed a lot of people who could speak English and so, by creating a dual role for Monique, I created yet another character, and every night, John and I would go back to the hotel and rewrite new stuff and shoot it over the next couple of days."

=== Filming ===
Wynorski reused sets from the previous sword and sorcery films Corman made in Argentina. He also stated that "the sets were pretty much trashed by the time I got there, 'cause I think I was the last guy to use them before they got torn down."

Wynorski said the producer, Frank Isaac, was "very upset" because they kept changing the original script: "Finally he [Isaac] got so angry about it he called Roger Corman, and Roger Corman’s family came down and Roger watched [the] dailies and said, 'This is fine, keep going'." When Corman got back to California, Wynorski asked him to send down the biggest lady wrestler he could find. Corman hired Dee Booher for the production, and so Wynorski filmed the Queen Kong scene with her.

Wynorski stated that the Argentinian producers "didn’t want to spend any money on this production, and it was difficult to get them to pony up a little money for extras or anything, but, you know, Roger kept calling up and saying, you owe me this, give it to the guy—and again, we were trying to be fun, without spending a lot of money and I think we got away with it, a lot of people enjoyed the movie because it doesn’t take itself seriously at all. It’s a comedy with action."

== Release ==
=== Home media ===
The film was released in the 2000s by Shout Factory as part of "Roger Corman's Cult Classics: Sword and Sorcery Collection". The collection features Deathstalker, Deathstalker II, Barbarian Queen, and The Warrior and the Sorceress.

The release of Deathstalker II in this collection was quite different from past VHS and DVD releases. It featured a new anamorphic widescreen transfer (1.78:1) and an approved director's cut of the film.

== Sequel ==
A sequel titled Deathstalker and the Warriors from Hell was released in 1988.
