= Wizards of the Lost Kingdom II =

- Spanish-language video poster
- Directed by: Charles B. Griffith
- Written by: Charles B. Griffith; Lane Smith
- Produced by: Reid Shane; Roger Corman (executive producer)
- Starring: Mel Welles; Robert Jayne; David Carradine; Lana Clarkson; Sid Haig
- Cinematography: Geza Sinkovics
- Edited by: Jonas Thaler
- Music by: David M. Rubin
- Distributed by: Concorde Pictures
- Release date: March 1989
- Country: United States

Wizards of the Lost Kingdom II is a 1989 American sword and sorcery film written and directed by Charles B. Griffith and starring David Carradine, Mel Welles and Lana Clarkson. It was Griffith's last feature film credit and is a sequel to the Argentine-American cult film Wizards of the Lost Kingdom (1985).

== Plot ==
The aging and incompetent wizard Caedmon is tasked by Grand-Wizard Vanir with training the young farmhand Tyor in the ways of magic, as he is the Chosen One, destined to free the three kingdoms from the three evil sorcerers that rule them with the power of three magical objects.

To do so, Tyor must pass a test in each kingdom. In the first kingdom, Baldor must free Prince Erman to spark an uprising and defeat the evil sorcerer Loki, who is holding three maidens hostage. Loki tries to defeat Caedmon and Tyor with the Amulet of Light, his source of power, but is disarmed by the latter and turned to stone with his own weapon.

With the help of Princess Amathea, a female warrior, they liberate her kingdom of Venir from the evil sorcerer Donar. As his second test, Tyor is tasked by Vanir to face Donar alone and obtain his source of power, the magical Sword of Justice. In the castle, he is almost seduced by the magic of Freya, Donar's mistress, but in the end, he overcomes her spell and obtains the sword. At dawn, Amathea leads an attack on Donar's colliseum and liberates her kingdom, but Donar escapes to Zord, the third kingdom ruled by Zarz.

On their way there, they reencounter the Dark One, a legendary warrior, and are able to enlist his help in liberating the kingdom. The Dark One kills the Protector, a monster guarding the evil sorcerer Zarz's castle, but Tyor, Caedmon, and Idun, the Dark One's wife, are taken prisoner. The Dark One takes the Sword of Justice and aids the townsfolk in their uprising, alongside Erman and Amathea. Zarz takes the amulet from Tyor and tries to seduce him to the dark side with his magical chalice, Tyor's final test, but fails. Caedmon attacks the two sorcerers but is overpowered. Just as they are about to kill him, Tyor unleashes his magic and kills Donar. Zarz faces Tyor, now armed with the Sword of Justice that the Dark One returned to him. Tyor hurls the sword at Zarz with magically enhanced strength and impales him.

Vanir appears and tasks the Dark One with naming the new ruler of the now united kingdoms, who chooses Erman and Amathea as king and queen. Tyor, now in possession of sword, chalice, and amulet, is named the new Grand-Wizard by Vanir and tasked with training Caedmon and further honing his craft through training and travel. The Dark One returns to his inn.

== Cast ==
- Mel Welles as Caedmon
- Robert Jayne as Tyor (as Bobby Jacoby)
- David Carradine as The Dark One
- Susan Lee Hoffman as Idun
- Blake Bahner as Erman
- Lana Clarkson as Amathea
- Henry Brandon as Zarz
- Wayne Grace as Vanir
- Edward Blackoff as Loki
- Victoria Hemingson as Maiden
- Sid Haig as Donar
- Diana Barton as Freyja

== Production ==
The film includes stock footage of characters, scenes as well as plot devices and objects from the first film, Deathstalker and its sequel, Barbarian Queen, Amazons and The Warrior and the Sorceress, all of which were also a co-production between Argentina and United States and starred several of the co-stars, such as Clarkson and Carradine. At times, entire scenes, especially battle sequences, of the other movies are reused and dubbed with new dialogue to make them appear as new footage.

Ed Naha, writer of the first film, stated:

Three years later I'm at a wedding reception for a friend who still works for Roger. And Roger's there. So we're chatting and kidding around, and I said, 'Ah, man, remember that "Wizards of the Lost Kingdom" movie?' And he said, 'Oh, y'know, that did very well in video. We filmed a sequel!'

== Release ==
Wizards of the Lost Kingdom II was distributed on home video by 20:20 Vision in the United Kingdom in April 1990.

== Legacy ==
In April 2017 Wizards of the Lost Kingdom II and its predecessor were both featured on the eleventh season of Mystery Science Theater 3000.
