= María Socas =

Argentine actress (1959–2024)

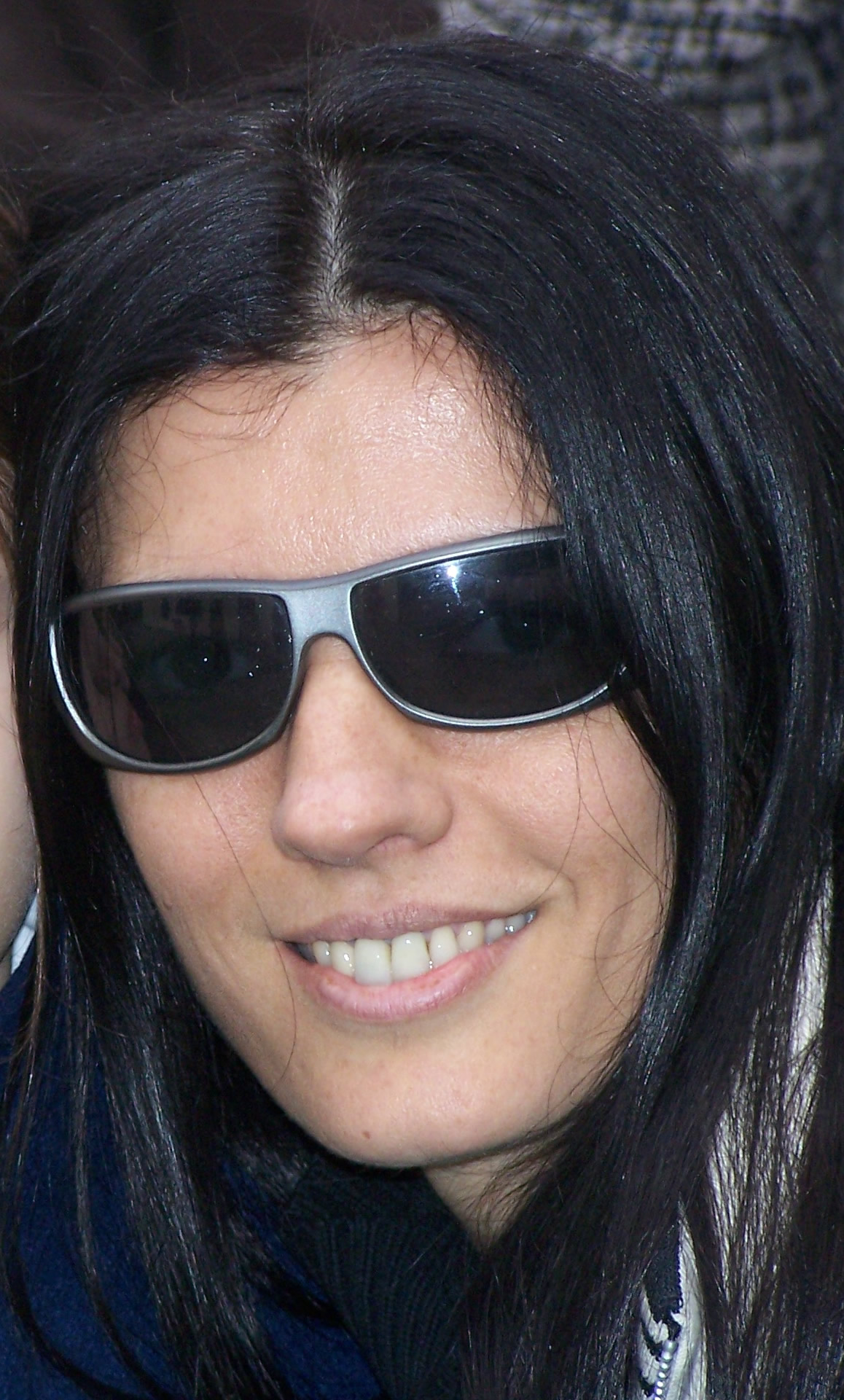
- Socas in 2013
- Born: María Antonia Socas; August 12, 1959; Buenos Aires, Argentina
- Died: December 10, 2024 (aged 65)
- Occupation: Actress
- Years active: 1983–2024
- Spouse: Rubén Brenner
- Children: Sasha Brenner; Wanda Brenner
- Parent(s): Carlos María Socas y Alvear; María Antonia Ortiz Lanús

María Antonia Socas Ortiz Lanús (August 12, 1959 – December 10, 2024) was an Argentine actress.

Although active in various media in her native country, particularly telenovelas and stage, she was foremost known to international viewers for a number of mid-1980s sword and sorcery films produced by Roger Corman and Héctor Olivera, most notably as one of the title characters in John C. Broderick's The Warrior and the Sorceress.

Socas died on December 10, 2024, at the age of 65.

== Partial filmography ==
- Las voces ("The Voices", 2011)
- Paco (2009)
- The Hands (2006)
- Kamchatka (2002)
- Foreign Affairs (1992)
- Deathstalker II (1987)
- Wizards of the Lost Kingdom (1985)
- The Warrior and the Sorceress (1984)
- Funny Dirty Little War (1983)

== Theatre ==
- Brujas, by Santiago Moncada, Teatro Niní Marshall (2018/2019).
- Gorda, by Neil LaBute - Teatro La Plaza (2008/2009).
- Platonov, by Anton Chekhov - Teatro Municipal San Martín (2003).
- De repente, el último verano, by Tennessee Williams - Teatro Municipal San Martín (1999).
- El padre, by August Strindberg - El excéntrico de la 18 (1989).
