= The Haunting of Morella =

- Directed by: Jim Wynorski
- Screenplay by: R. J. Robertson; Jim Wynroski
- Based on: "Morella" by Edgar Allan Poe
- Produced by: Roger Corman
- Starring: David McCallum; Nicole Eggert; Christopher Halsted; Lana Clarkson
- Cinematography: Zoran Hochstatter
- Edited by: Diane Fingado
- Music by: Fredric Ensign Teetsel; Chuck Cirino
- Production company: Concorde Pictures
- Distributed by: Concorde Pictures
- Release date: February 9, 1990 (Detroit)
- Running time: 87 minutes
- Country: United States
- Language: English
- Box office: $599,951

The Haunting of Morella is a 1990 American supernatural horror film directed by Jim Wynorski, and starring Nicole Eggert, David McCallum, Lana Clarkson, Jonathan Farwell, and Maria Ford. The film began shooting on September 13, 1989, in Los Angeles. It was released sporadically across the midwest United States in February 1990 where it performed poorly at the box office.

== Plot ==
A witch named Morella is put to death in Colonial America, leaving behind her husband and infant daughter, Lenora. Seventeen years later, Lenora has grown up and stands to inherit money arranged by her mother's family. With the stage set, Morella wants to return to life by taking over Lenora's body.

== Cast ==
- Nicole Eggert as Morella / Lenora
- David McCallum as Gideon
- Lana Clarkson as Coel
- Christopher Halsted as Guy
- Jonathan Farwell as Dr. Gault
- Maria Ford as Diane
- Gail Harris as Ilsa
- John O'Leary as Quintis
- Brewster Gould as Miles Archer
- Clement von Franckenstein as Judge Brock
- R.J. Robertson as Reverend Ward
- Deborah Dutch as Serving Girl

== Production ==
Principal photography on The Haunting of Morella began on September 13, 1989, in Los Angeles, under the title The Haunting of Maurella. Although director Jim Wynorski is not credited in the credits as the screenwriter, several sources (such as Variety) stated he was a screenwriter during production. The character Miles Archer was invented for the film.

== Release ==
The Haunting of Morella was released on February 9, 1990, in Detroit. In February 1990, Daily Variety noted the film opened "timidly" in only sixty theaters through the Midwest, where ticket sales were described as "weak," "tepid," and "dismal." The film continued to open regionally, premiering in San Diego on April 27, 1990, and in Los Angeles on June 22, 1990.

=== Home media ===
Scorpion Releasing released the film on DVD on November 17, 2015. Scorpion released a Blu-ray edition the following year on May 6, 2016.

== Reception ==
=== Box office ===
The Haunting of Morella grossed $599,951 at the United States box office.

=== Critical response ===
Kyle Leonard wrote in the 1991 Motion Picture Guide that the film was "nothing more than an excuse for its female characters to take off their clothes and kill each other." The review went on to note that "Eggert shows some depth in her portrayal of the wholly innocent Lenora and the equally wicked Morella [...] one wonders how she got herself into this softcore horror film." A critic credited as "Advo." wrote in Variety declared "Nudity, lesbianism, softcore sex, beer barrel-breasted babes: The Haunting of Morella has it all. But that's still not enough to give this predictable dull rendering of an Edgar Allan Poe tale much life at the boxoffice."

Ken Cormier of The Bradenton Herald gave the film a one and a half out of four star-rating, describing it as "uncleverly concealed softcore pornography". The New York Daily News review noted: "Director Wynorski tries to add life to the deadly dull proceedings by laying on a lot of T&A tableaux, which is inarguably preferable to not trying at all."

== Sources ==
- Leonard, Kyle (1991). The Motion Picture Guide: 1991 Annual (The Films of 1990). Baseline II. ISBN 0-933997-00-0.
- Advo. (1991). Variety's Film Reviews 1989-1990. Vol. 21. R. R. Bowker. There are no page numbers in this book. This entry is found under the header "March 14, 1990". ISBN 0-8352-3089-9.
