= Maximum Drive =

- Genre: Game show
- Directed by: Eytan Keller
- Presented by: Joe Fowler with Brian Vermeire; Mercedes Colon
- Composer: Transition Music
- Country of origin: United States

Production
- Executive producers: Vin Di Bona; Eytan Keller
- Producer: Terry Moore
- Production location: Universal Studios Hollywood
- Running time: 30 Minutes
- Production companies: R.P.M. Productions, Inc. Vin Di Bona Productions

Original release
- Network: The Family Channel
- Release: August 29 – November 25, 1994

Maximum Drive is a children's competition show hosted by Joe Fowler with co-hosts Brian Vermeire and Mercedes Colon that aired on The Family Channel from August 29 to November 25, 1994.

On each show, three teams of kids competed in various motorsports to earn points, with the highest scoring team after five races winning the championship.

== Teams ==
There were a total of 15 teams that made the roster for Maximum Drive, each team represented by an animal name.

== Events ==
The events were completely random per each episode, but any game using the lake and/or multiple players were always the last two for teams to compete. Each had a specific vehicle used, and sometimes they used more than one player.

- Long Course Race (ATV, XR-80, Cubs) – In this race, the players would go around the long course for three laps on the vehicles permitted for the events. Only one person was allowed to race for each team. Teams had to deal with Hair-Pin Alley and the Horse Shoe turns throughout the race. The person who crossed the finish line first would win 1st place.
- Short Course Race (ATV, XR-80, Cubs) – Similar to the Long Course, teams had to take a shorter route on the Maximum Drive Course. Only this time they had to ride for five laps till they reached the finish line.
- Argo (Argos Only) – The six wheel vehicles were used for this event only. The players would drive around another course on the Maximum Drive course which led into the two mud pits called the "Bog" and the "Gator Pit". They would drive for three laps on the course, and this event could use one or two players from each team to play.
- Slam Dunk (Wave Runner Only) – Slam Dunk was one of two water events of the whole series. All three players would participate in this game. The objective was to send one player on the Yamaha Wave Runner to retrieve flotation balls from two teammates on rafters in the Maximum Drive Lake and dunk them into enter-tubes. If a ball entered a tube, they would get a point. There were three balls (2 yellow & 1 red) and they had up to 90 seconds to score. If a ball fell in the water, they could retrieve it as long as time permitted it; however if they failed, they had to move onto the next ball. The team with the most balls in the tubes would get 1st place.
- Soccer (ATV Only) – Its soccer Maximum Drive style. In the center of the course, one player from each team would try to knock up to three giant bean bag balls into the goal lines. Each one they got was worth 1 point, however they only had one shot with each ball and they had 40 seconds to complete it.
- BMX Rally (Mountain Bikes Only) – In this event all players participated and they would ride on Mountain Bikes on the Hair Pin Alley Course. They had three laps to complete before finishing, and the rankings were determined by how many players of the same team were among the top finishers. Example: 1st place (1st, 3rd, 4th) 2nd (2nd, 5th, 7th) and 3rd (6th, 8th, 9th).
- Hover Ball (Hover Craft Only) – The second of two water events and this only aired once in the finale. The goal of this game was similar to Slam Dunk, but one player from each team would ride a hover craft and try to toss four balls into a goal net in two tries. The player with the most goals would win 1st place.
- Over The Mat (All Ground Vehicles) – One of the few games that used all three track vehicles in the main games, and was most often the second or final event of the day. The players would make one lap around the long or short courses before making a turn to the center of the course where they would park their vehicles into a parking zone that had their team color. They had to avoid knocking a ball off a cone when parking, otherwise they were penalized five seconds before they could continue. Once they parked they could jump on blue safety mats and the giant bean bag ball in order to switch to the next vehicle or tag their partner to continue the race. There were four laps for this and the first player to cross would win 1st place.
- Gear Up (All Ground Vehicles) – One of two final events, Gear up required all 3 players to play in a Relay race similar to Over the Mat. One player would race one full lap on the long course, then make a turn to the center field where they get over the mat and pass either goggles or a glove to their team mate where they had to put it on before continuing the course, and again they would repeat the process to the next team member. Then the final member would complete the final lap to lock 1st place for their team.
- Balloon Boogie (All Ground Vehicles) – Same rules as Gear Up, but players had to throw a water balloon to their team mate where they had to catch it and break it on the ground before continuing.

== Scoring system ==
Teams earn points depending on how they placed in the game. 1st place earned 5 points; 2nd place earned 3 points; 3rd place earned 1 point; In the event of ties, the points would go as follows: Tie for 1st earned 4 points; Tie for 2nd earned 2 points.

== Rules ==
There were penalties that could either delay or disqualify a team from the race.

- Five-second Penalty – In Over the Mat, Gear Up, and Balloon Boogie, if a team knocked a ball off their cone when parking, they were penalized for five seconds before continuing.
- Disqualifications – If a team parked into the wrong color zone, went into the wrong route, or quitted, they were disqualified and would not receive any points for that event.
- Technicalities – If a team stalled or knocked into the hay bails, they were still in the race but were given a yellow caution flag to the other teams until they were able to continue. If a team was unable to complete the course, they are automatically given 3rd place.

== Playoffs ==
The season ended with a playoff. Each team competed in 11 matches, and the 12 teams with the best records would compete in the playoff matches.

- The Playoffs - 1st Rounds – The 12 teams are assigned positions based on their performance for the entire season, the winner of each round will advance to the Quarter Finals. Teams who did not win would qualify for wild card spots. Only 5 teams with the highest scores will advance.
- The Quarter Finals – The 9 teams advancing would repeat the same as the first rounds, winners of each round would advance and the top 3 scoring teams would also continue to the semi-finals
- The Semi-Finals – The remaining 6 teams would continue the same sequence again, the 2 winning teams will advance to the finals and the team with the best score of the remaining teams would also advance to the finals.
- The Finals – Like any normal episode, the teams would play different games including the Hover Ball game in the finals until the winners of the day would be the Maximum Drive Champions.

The series, a Vin Di Bona Production, lasted only three months - unlike the show it debuted with, Masters of the Maze. Despite its short run, the program was nominated for a CableACE Award.
