= Amanece en la ruta =

Song by Suéter

from the album Lluvia de gallinas
- Recorded: April 1984
- Length: 3:50
- Songwriter(s): Miguel Zavaleta
- Producer(s): Suéter

"Amanece en la ruta" ("Sunrise on the route") is a song from the group of Argentine rock and new wave Suéter. It is the second song that is part of their second studio album Lluvia de gallinas; released in 1984 by 20th Century Records.

== Interpretation of the lyrics ==
The lyrics of the song tell a fictional story about seeing death in a car accident and being told in first person. The text itself is a fallacy; because its author explained that the text is fictional, although he dedicated it to a cousin, who died in a traffic accident. Thus, the text is written from the place of the victim and the feelings they may have felt to experience death.

It has become a classic of Argentine rock and was ranked #95 of the top 100 songs of Argentine rock.

It has also been performed by artists as diverse as Fabiana Cantilo, Hilda Lizarazu, and Olivia Viggiano, among others.
