= Barbi Benton =

American retired model, actress and singer (born 1950)

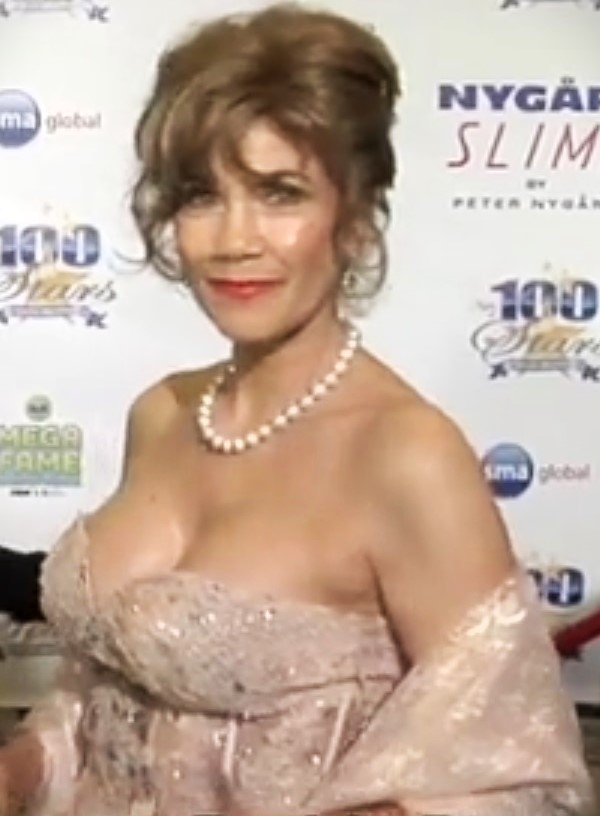
- Benton in 2014
- Born: Barbara Lynn Klein; January 28, 1950 (age 76); New York City, U.S.
- Occupations: Playboy model, singer, actress
- Years active: 1968–1986
- Known for: The Great American Beauty Contest; Fantasy Island; Deathstalker; The Love Boat; Hee Haw
- Spouse: George Gradow (m. 1979)
- Partner: Hugh Hefner (1969–1976)
- Children: 2

Barbi Benton (born Barbara Lynn Klein; January 28, 1950) is an American former model, actress, television personality, and singer. She appeared in Playboy magazine, as a regular on the comedy series Hee Haw, and recorded several moderately successful albums in the 1970s. After the birth of her first child in 1986, Benton retired from show business.

== Early life ==
Benton was born Barbara Lynn Klein in New York City to a Jewish family. Her father was a gynecologist, and her mother worked as an investment counselor.

Benton grew up in Sacramento and was a childhood friend of journalist Joan Lunden. Benton and future Warhol superstar Jay Johnson were junior high school sweethearts. While attending Rio Americano High School, she pursued many interests, including scuba diving and playing piano. She also did tearoom modeling of department store clothes while in school. She intended to study to be a veterinarian at UCLA, but decided against that career option after realizing she had an aversion to the sight of blood.

== Career ==
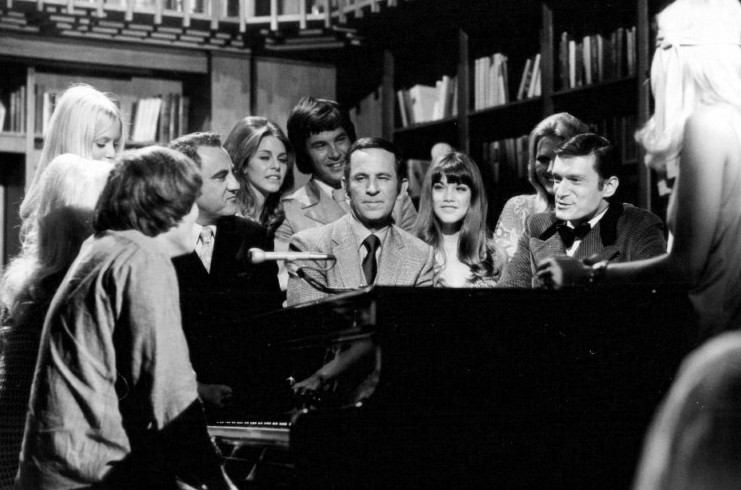
Bill Dana (dark jacket), Don Adams (center), Benton, and Hugh Hefner from the TV program Playboy After Dark, in 1970

Benton began to model at age 16. She took a job with Playboy at age 18 while attending UCLA to appear on their entertainment show Playboy After Dark. She began as an extra on the show, but host Hugh Hefner fell in love with her, and her role was quickly elevated to co-host. Hefner asked her for a date, and she reportedly demurred: "I don't know, I've never dated anyone over 24 before." (Hefner was 42 at the time.) Hefner allegedly replied, "That's all right, neither have I." The two began a relationship that lasted several years and placed Benton in the center of the Playboy enterprise. Hefner persuaded her to change her name from Barbara Klein to the more "marketable" Barbi Benton. She is credited with persuading Hefner to buy the Playboy Mansion in Holmby Hills in 1974.

Benton appeared on the cover of Playboy four times: July 1969, March 1970, May 1972, and December 1985. She had additional nude photo layouts in the December 1973 and January 1975 issues. She was featured in a number of photo-essays, but she was never a Playmate of the Month.

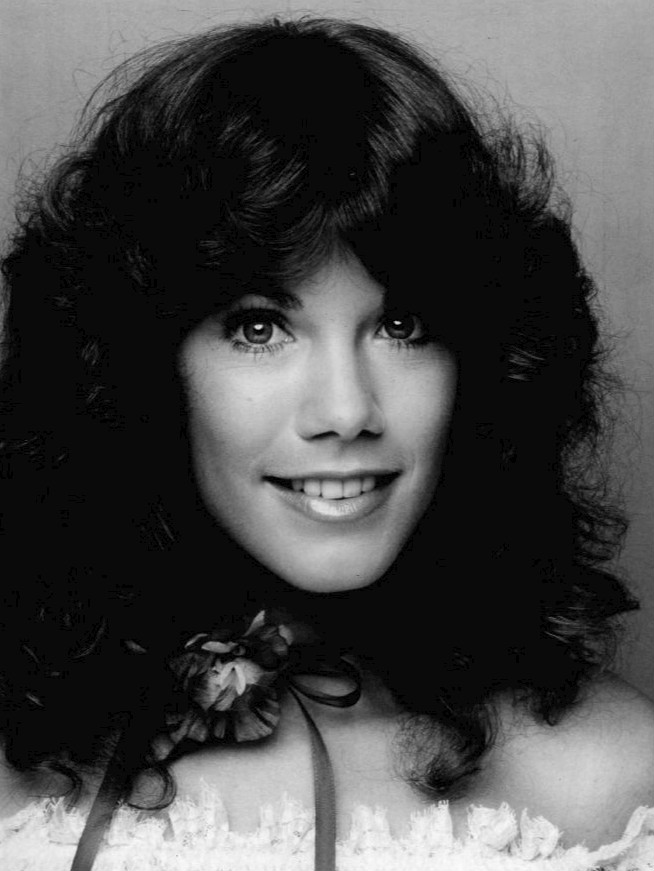
Benton in 1977

Benton appeared on Hee Haw doing short comedy sketches, and she was a dancer in some of the episodes of Season 5 and 6 (1971 to 1973) of Rowan and Martin's Laugh-In. She left Hee Haw after four seasons to concentrate on a more Hollywood-oriented career. She appeared on a number of 1970s American television series, including The Bobby Vinton Show, The Love Boat, and Fantasy Island.

Benton lived with Hefner from 1969 until 1976 and is known for discovering the Playboy Mansion West, where Hefner resided until his death in 2017.

=== Recording career ===
Benton achieved some success as a recording artist, hitting the country charts in the mid 1970s. After beginning her career on Playboy Records in 1974, her record "Brass Buckles" (1975) was a top-five hit on Billboard's country singles chart. Follow-up singles charted modestly through 1976. Her third album, Something New, was oriented more towards the pop market, and featured her only single that made the pop charts, "Staying Power" (which "bubbled under" at #108).

Her final country album Ain't That Just the Way (1978) was released only in Scandinavia; the title track was a number one hit in Sweden for five weeks. The same song was also a major hit for Lutricia McNeal in 1996, and was recorded by the Dutch singer Patricia Paay under the title Poor Jeremy in 1977.

Benton's final album, 1988's Kinetic Voyage was very different from her earlier work. This was a largely instrumental new age album for which Benton composed or co-composed all the songs, played piano and synths, and produced and arranged the work in collaboration with Jamii Szmadzinski.

== Personal life ==
Benton dated Playboy magazine founder Hugh Hefner from 1969 to 1976. Hefner asked Benton to marry him four times, but he was unfaithful during their relationship. When Benton pursued a singing career, their relationship deteriorated further as she spent more time on the road touring.

She married real estate developer George Gradow on October 14, 1979. They have two children, Alexander and Ariana. They divide their time between homes in Aspen and Los Angeles. Their Aspen home, known as ”The Copper Palace” was designed by architect Bart Prince and featured on MTV's Extreme Cribs.

== Discography ==
=== Albums ===
| Year | Album | Chart Positions | | Label |
| Year | Album | US Country | US | Label |
|---|---|---|---|---|
| 1975 | Barbi Doll | 17 | — | Playboy |
| 1975 | Barbi Benton | 18 | — | Playboy |
| 1976 | Something New | 39 | 208 | Playboy |
| 1978 | Ain't That Just the Way (No U.S. Release) | — | — | Playboy |
| 1988 | Kinetic Voyage | — | — | Takoma |

=== Singles ===
| Year | Title | Peak positions | | | Album |
| Year | Title | US Country | US | CAN Country | Album |
|---|---|---|---|---|---|
| 1975 | "Brass Buckles" | 5 | — | 6 | Barbi Benton |
| 1975 | "Movie Magazine, Stars in Her Eyes" | 61 | — | — | Barbi Benton |
| 1975 | "Roll You Like a Wheel" (with Mickey Gilley) | 32 | — | 19 | non-album |
| 1975 | "Ain't That Just The Way (That Life Goes Down)" | 74 | — | — | Barbi Benton |
| 1976 | "Staying Power" | — | 108 | — | Something New |
"—" denotes releases that did not chart

== Filmography ==
- How Did a Nice Girl Like You Get Into This Business? (a.k.a. Mir hat es immer Spaß gemacht) (1970, West Germany)
- The Great American Beauty Contest (1973, TV movie)
- The Third Girl from the Left (1973, TV movie)
- For the Love of It (1980, TV movie)
- Hospital Massacre (also known as X-Ray) (1982)
- Deathstalker (1983)

== Television appearances ==
- Playboy After Dark (1968), as herself
- Hee Haw (1969), as herself
- Rowan and Martin's Laugh In, as an occasional fifth season dancer
- Marcus Welby, M.D. (1972), playing Liz in episode: "We'll Walk Out of Here Together" (episode # 4.3)
- The Midnight Special (1973), as herself
- American Bandstand (1975), guest artist
- McCloud (1975), playing Shannon Forbes in episode "Park Avenue Pirates", performed "Philadelphia Freedom","Brass Buckles" and "Ain't That Just The Way", in character, during the course of the episode
- Nashville on the Road (1975), artist
- The Bobby Vinton Show (1976), as herself
- The Sonny & Cher Comedy Hour, (1977), as herself
- Sugar Time! (1977), playing Maxx Douglas.
- Fantasy Island:
  - as Shirley Russell in episode "Poof, You're a Movie Star" (season 1, 1978)
  - as Dee Dee Verona in episodes "The Appointment" and "Mr. Tattoo" (season 2, 1978)
  - as Bunny Kelly in episodes "Baby" and "Marathon: Battle of the Sexes" (season 3, 1979)
  - as Erica Clark in episodes "Playgirl" and "Smith's Valhalla" (season 3, 1980)
  - as Molly Delahanti in episodes "The Love Doctor", "Pleasure Palace" and "Possessed" (season 4, 1980).
  - episodes "The Devil and Mr. Roarke", "Ziegfeld Girls" and "Kid Corey Rides Again" (season 5, 1981).
  - as Marsha Garnett/Carla Baines in episodes "The Man from Yesterday" and "World's Most Desirable Woman" (season 4, 1981)
  - as Courtney/Miss Winslow in episodes "House of Dolls" and "Wuthering Heights" (season 5, 1982)
- The Love Boat:
  - as Brigitte in episodes "Computerman", "Parlez-Vous" and "Memories of You" (1978)
  - as Kiki Atwood in episode "Marooned, parts 1 and 2" (1978)
  - as Lucy in episodes "Not Now, I'm Dying", "Eleanor's Return" and "Too Young to Love" (1979)
  - as Cathy Somms in episodes "The Nudist from Sunshine Gardens", "Eye of the Beholder" and "Bugged" (1981)
- America 2-Night (1978), as herself, receiving the UBS Lifetime Achievement Award
- Hollywood Squares (1978) as a guest panelist
- Vega$ (1979), playing Holly in episode "Design For Death" (episode # 2.5)
- The Tonight Show Starring Johnny Carson (1980), guest
- Doug Henning's World of Magic V (1980), as an assistant in the "sawing a woman in half" illusion
- When the Whistle Blows (1980), playing Dixie, or Miss Ironworker, in episode "Miss Hard Hat USA" (episode # 1.7)
- Charlie's Angels (1980), playing Toni Green in episode "Island Angels" (episode # 5.5)
- The Misadventures of Sheriff Lobo (1981) playing country singer Kitty Rhinestone in episode "The Cowboy Connection"
- CHiPs (1981) playing Sal in episode "Ponch's Angels, parts 1 and 2" (episodes # 4.14/15)
- Tattletales (1982–84) with playing partner George Gradow
- The Match Game-Hollywood Squares Hour (1983) as a guest panelist
- Circus of the Stars (1982, 1980, 1979), performer
- Matt Houston (1983) playing Ava Randolph in episode "Purrfect Crime" (episode # 1.13)
- Mickey Spillane's Mike Hammer (1984) playing Susan Lancaster in episode "Catfight" (episode # 2.4)
- Hammer House of Mystery and Suspense And the Wall Came Tumbling Down (1984) playing Caroline Trent
- Safe at Home (1985) playing Connie Simpson in episode "Old Flame"
- Murder, She Wrote (1986) playing Sue Beth in episode "Murder in the Electric Cathedral" (episode # 2.16)
- Riptide (1986), playing Gina Potter in episode "Playing Hardball" (episode # 3.17)
- Barbi Benton Presents: Best Buns On the Beach (circa 1990), host
- Barbi Benton Presents: Stripper of the Year (circa 1990), host
- Hugh Hefner: Once Upon a Time (1992), as herself
- Playboy: The Party Continues (2000), as herself
- Entertainment Tonight (2002), as herself
- Playboy's 50th Anniversary (2003), as herself
- The Girls Next Door, as herself in "Fight Night" (2005), "Guess Who's Coming to Luncheon?" (2007), "Kickin' Aspen" (2008), and "The Wheel World" (2009)
- The E! True Hollywood Story – Hugh Hefner: Girlfriends, Wives, and Centerfolds (2006), as herself.
- Extreme Cribs: Episode 5 (2011), as herself
- Million Dollar Rooms (2012, HGTV), featuring her "Copper Palace" mansion in Aspen, Colorado

== Theater appearances ==
- I Love My Life (1982). This production of the hit 1978 Broadway musical comedy co-starred Barry Williams and was performed in January 1982 as part of the annual theatrical series at the La Mirada Civic Theatre in California. Benton received upbeat reviews for her performance as "Chloe."
