= Visionaries: Knights of the Magical Light =

Television series

- Title card
- Genre: Action-adventure; Science fantasy; Superhero
- Created by: Flint Dille
- Directed by: Yoshi Mikamoto
- Voices of: Susan Blu; Roscoe Lee Browne; Peter Cullen; Jim Cummings; Jennifer Darling; Bernard Erhard; Jonathan Harris; Chris Latta; Michael McConnohie; Hal Rayle; Neil Ross; Beau Weaver
- Narrated by: Malachi Throne
- Theme music composer: Ford Kinder; Anne Bryant
- Composers: Thomas Chase Jones; Steve Rucker
- Countries of origin: United States; Japan
- Original language: English
- No. of seasons: 1
- No. of episodes: 13

Production
- Executive producers: Joe Bacal; Yutaka Fujioka; Tom Griffin
- Running time: 22 min.
- Production companies: Hasbro; Sunbow Productions; TMS Entertainment

Original release
- Network: First-run syndication
- Release: September 20 – December 13, 1987

Visionaries: Knights of the Magical Light is a science fantasy media franchise that consisted of a short-lived toyline of action figures and vehicles produced by Hasbro, and an animated series by Sunbow Productions that ran for one season of thirteen episodes in 1987. Star Comics published a bimonthly comic book series that lasted six issues from November 1987 to September 1988. The animated series was the first Hasbro property to be produced by Sunbow without the aid of Marvel Productions, and utilized Japanese studio Tokyo Movie Shinsha for overseas animation work.

IDW Publishing published a five-issue crossover comic miniseries featuring the series characters and the Transformers in 2018.

== Overview ==
The story is set on the fictional planet of Prysmos, a futuristic society where all technology and complex machinery suddenly cease functioning, and its citizens are forced to rely on ancient magic to survive. This happens when the three suns of the planet align and their combined radiation emissions deactivate all technology on the planet, similar to an electromagnetic pulse effect. The titular Visionaries are knights who are split into two factions: the heroic Spectral Knights and the evil Darkling Lords. The Visionaries who wish to gain the usage of magic are invited to a competition by the wizard Merklynn. After surviving traps, dangerous creatures, and each other, survivors are rewarded with unique animal totems affixed to their armor chestplates; these talismans are based on the bearers' individual attributes while allowing them to transform into their specific creatures.

Some of the knights are given staves enchanted with various magic powers that are activated by its holder reciting a special verse. They could be used only once before they needed to be replenished in the animated series, but had unlimited use in the comic series. Characters who could not use these weapons instead had the power to infuse vehicles with magical powers, the spells for which were printed on official toy packaging but never used in either the comics or the animated series. In the Star Comics series, the female characters were given shields which operated in the same manner as the male characters' power staves.

== Characters ==
=== Spectral Knights ===
Headed by Leoric, the Spectral Knights are magic users who use magic for the purposes of good; they are the protagonists of the series.

Character	Description	Totem	Voice performer
Leoric	Leoric is the leader of the Spectral Knights and prince of the fictional city of New Valarak. In the first issue of the 1987 Star Comics series, he was named as the city's mayor during the Age of Science. He possesses the totem of the Lion and his power staff bestows the Power of Wisdom. He is the only Spectral Knight to have facial hair (a mustache), and his main adversary is Darkstorm.	Lion	Neil Ross
Leoric	Magical power: / Wisdom – "Whispered secrets of a shattered age, I summon you: renew this sage!"		
Ectar	Ectar is Leoric's lieutenant on matters relating to the city of New Valarak. Before the death of technology, he was a police detective in the city of Valarak who often matched wits against a master thief named Reekon, who later becomes a Darkling Lord and his main adversary. He possesses the totem of the Fox and is one of several knights who do not have a power staff but are able to magically power vehicles. His personal vehicle is the Lancer Cycle, which possessed the Power of Protection.	Fox	Michael McConnohie
Ectar	Magical power: / Protection – "Shield this craft from one and all. Reflect, deflect, depose and fall!" (Note: Appears only on official toy packaging and never spoken in the cartoon or comic series.)		
Feryl	Feryl is the youngest of the Spectral Knights. Like Ectar and Leoric, he lives in New Valarak. He possesses the totem of the Wolf and has no staff but operates the Capture Chariot, the Knights' main transport and attack vehicle that possesses the Power of Fire. His main adversary is Mortdredd.	Wolf	Beau Weaver
Feryl	Magical power: / Fire – "Draw upon the breath of stars, and scorch the skies with fiery scars!"		
Cryotek	The oldest of the group, Cryotek hails from the northern frozen kingdom of Northalia. He possesses the totem of the Bear and his staff bestows the Power of Strength that manifests as a magical archer firing an arrow. He is shown to have a romantic relationship with fellow Spectral Knight Galadria, while his main adversary among the Darkling Lords is Cindarr, with whom he is hinted at having a past history in the animated series.	Bear	Bernard Erhard
Cryotek	Magical power: / Strength – "Three suns aligned, pour forth their light, and fill the archer's bow with might!"		
Witterquick	Prince of an unnamed city in the south, Witterquick possesses the totem of the Cheetah and his staff bestows the Power of Lightspeed. Although Ectar is Leoric's second in command of matters pertaining to the city of New Valarak, it is Witterquick who gives the orders and keeps the others in line if Leoric is absent. If necessary, Witterquick is the most ready to bend the rules for the greater good.	Cheetah	Jim Cummings
Witterquick	Magical power: / Lightspeed – "Sheathe these feet in the driving gale, make swift these legs, o'er land I sail!"		
Arzon	A deontologist by nature, Arzon possesses the totem of the Eagle and his staff imparts the Power of Knowledge. He is one of the youngest Spectral Knights and can be quite impetuous, optimistic, and eager to help despite the danger.	Eagle	Hal Rayle
Arzon	Magical power: / Knowledge – "A whim, a thought, and more is sought. Awake my mind; thy will be wrought!"		
Galadria	The only female Spectral Knight, Galadria hails from the city of Androsia. She is the love interest of fellow Spectral Knight Cryotek, and her main adversary is Virulina. Her totem is the Dolphin, and she had no staff but was given a magical shield imbued with the power of Healing in the Star Comics series.	Dolphin	Susan Blu
Galadria	Magical power: / Healing – "By warmth of heart, your pain I feel. Grant me the power, your wounds to heal!" (Note: Featured only in the 1987 Star Comics series.)		

=== Darkling Lords ===
Headed by Darkstorm, the Darkling Lords use their powers for selfish aims and are the antagonists of the series.

Character	Description	Totem	Voice performer
Darkstorm	The leader of the Darkling Lords, and prior to their creation Darkstorm commanded the allegiance of Reekon and Mortdredd. He secures the services of the other members by having them swear loyalty to him in exchange for freeing them from a trap during Merklynn's magical challenge. He bears the totem of the Mollusk and his power staff wields the Power of Decay, which included a counter spell to reverse its effects. His main adversary is Leoric.	Mollusk	Chris Latta
Darkstorm	Magical power: / Decay – "By what creeps, what crawls, by what does not; let all that grows recede and rot!" Decay Reversal – "Power of rot, obscuring truth, what once was old restore to youth!"		
Reekon	A career thief during the Age of Science, Reekon serves Darkstorm as a hired mercenary. He finds himself often engaging in a battle of wits against Ectar, with whom he has a professional rivalry and mutual respect. He possesses the totem of the Lizard and has no staff but operates the Dagger Assault, the Darkling Lords' rolling fortress that contains a small attack plane and containment cell used for magically removing animal totems.	Lizard	Roscoe Lee Browne
Reekon	Magical power: / Magic Extractor – "Flay the flesh, lay bare the bone. Upon this field, let grief be sown!"		
Mortdredd	Mortdredd is Darkstorm's most loyal servant and unapologetic sycophant. His totem is the Beetle and he has no staff but is the designated pilot of the Sky Claw, the Lords' aerial assault craft. His main adversary is Feryl, as both are loyal to their respective leaders.	Beetle	Jonathan Harris
Mortdredd	Magical power: / Flight – "Wings of steel shall ride the breeze. Invade the air, the land, the seas!"		
Cindarr	Previously a construction worker during the Age of Science, Cindarr is the oldest of the fourteen knights, and his main adversary is Cryotek. He joins the Darkling Lords only because of the oath of loyalty to Darkstorm he is forced to make, and is considered a dullard by his peers due to his impedimental speech and compassion toward small animals. He bears the totem of the Gorilla and his staff invokes the Power of Destruction.	Gorilla	Peter Cullen
Cindarr	Magical power: / Destruction – "By nature's hand, by craft, by art; what once was one now fly apart!"		
Cravex	Aggressive and short-tempered, Cravex is the most combative of the Darkling Lords, and while the other Darkling Lords have a specific enemy in the Spectral Knights, Cravex is willing to fight any of them, and even threatens his fellow Darkling Lords with harm if they cross him. Cravex bears the totem of the phylot (a Prysmosian pterodactyl-like flying scavenger) and his power staff invokes the Power of Fear.	Phylot	Chris Latta
Cravex	Magical power: / Fear – "Oh mist-filled pits, dark, dank, unclear; touch all before me with frost-fingered fear!"		
Lexor	Lexor is generally regarded as a liar and a coward. He possesses the totem of the Armadillo and his staff offers the Power of Invulnerability, which generates an impenetrable barrier that is often used as a counter against Cryotek's staff of Strength.	Armadillo	Michael McConnohie
Lexor	Magical power: / Invulnerability – "The arrows turn, the swords rebel; may nothing pierce this mortal shell!"		
Virulina	The lone female Darkling Lord, Virulina worked as a newscaster prior to the Age of Magic, and her main adversary is Galadria. Her totem is the Shark and in the 1987 Star Comics series, she possesses a shield imbued with the Power of Disease.	Shark	Jennifer Darling
Virulina	Magical power: / Disease – "Winds of sickness, illness most vile, strike down my enemy with disease revile!"		

=== Other characters ===
- Merklynn (voiced by Roscoe Lee Browne) is a wizard who occupies a shrine inside Iron Mountain. Merklynn invites knights from across the land to compete in an obstacled race to his shrine, rewarding those who reach its hall with magical abilities. In exchange for recharging their power staffs, Merklynn contracts both the Darkling Lords and Spectral Knights to venture on other quests on his behalf. He sometimes offers magical devices in exchange for their services as well, but Merklynn's gifts usually prove to be more trouble than they are worth. The character was named after Hasbro sculptor Bill Merklein, who developed the holography for the toyline.
- Falkama (voiced by Jim Cummings) is a member of the same circle of wizardry as Merklynn. He is first seen in possession of an artifact called the Dragon's Eye, which Merklynn needs to replenish his magical pool. He is later used by Darkstorm in the latter's failed plot to depose Merklynn, and is then among a trio of fugitive wizards apprehended by the Spectral Knights and imprisoned by Merklynn. The character's name was created by Flint Dille from the surnames of comics writers Lee Falk and Larry Hama.
- Bogavas (voiced by Jim Cummings) is an enigmatic wizard who is among the three escapees from the Wizards' Jail along with Falkama and Weazaskweaza. When the Spectral Knights capture and bring him to Merklynn, Bogavas denies knowing any real magic. Merklynn subjects him to a test to prove his honesty, which he seemingly passes and is thus allowed to go free.
- Weazaskweaza (voiced by Bernard Erhard) is a wizard who is condemned to never tell the truth and was imprisoned in the Wizards' Jail along with Falkama and Bogavas. After the Darkling Lords take advantage of his curse to locate a lost underground shrine, Weazaskweaza betrays them and seeks a source of power inside the shrine that would allow him to supplant Merklynn, but is thwarted by Leoric and reimprisoned. According to Flint Dille, Weazaskweaza's name was an instance of inserting "crude adolescent humor" into the show.
- Heskedor (voiced by Susan Blu) is an ancient crone who lives in an isolated cave. When Darkstorm seeks Heskedor's aid in defeating Leoric, she creates a potion that will permanently trap Leoric in his lion totem form if the spell is not broken by sunset. The Spectral Knights manage to catch on to Darkstorm's scheme and Witterquick confronts Heskedor, forcing her to hand over an antidote to the potion.
- Fletchen (voiced by Jennifer Darling) is a young woman from a peasant village outside New Valarak. Darkstorm uses her superstitious people as unwitting pawns in his plan to permanently trap Leoric in his lion form. Though she is able to convince his fellow Spectral Knights of the truth, the other townspeople refuse to listen and only stop attacking the Spectral Knights once Leoric is freed from the spell.
- Gleering (voiced by Peter Cullen) is Fletchen's father. He and his fellow villagers are fearful of all magic and lean on superstition to ward off evil. Darkstorm exploits this to turn them against the Spectral Knights by convincing them that they are evil wizards guarding a magical beast. Gleering and his people learn that they had nothing to fear from magic, provided it is used for good.
- Orzan (voiced by Peter Cullen) is the ruler of Khemir, a city that thrived in the Age of Science and utilized robotic slaves. Despite falling into destitution after the death of technology, the Khemirites stubbornly refuse to change their way of living. Darkstorm preys on Orzan's pride and his people's desperation by using them to assist in the Darkling Lords' takeover of New Valarak. After experiencing a fearful vision of his robot slaves rebelling against him, he renounces slavery and pledges to adapt to the current times.
- Belizar (voiced by Jim Cummings) is a young Khemirite man who first alerts the Darkling Lords to his people's plight, and aids them in conquering New Valarak and enslaving the Spectral Knights. After being told that, since he was not a Darkling Lord, he was ineligible to compete for the Spectral Knights' power staff. Belizar vents his frustration on Leoric and Ectar by forcing them to move furniture for him. Later, however, he and his fellow Khemirite, Mana, help the Spectral Knights escape and regain their totem powers. Belizar vowed to one day prove worthy of knighthood; in the meantime, he would stay in New Valarak and help the people rebuild.
- Marna (voiced by Jennifer Darling) is a young Khemirite woman who suggests that her people begin fending for themselves after the death of technology has rendered their robotic slaves obsolete, but she is rebuked as they consider it demeaning to their culture. After taking part in Darkstorm's invasion of New Valarak, during which the Spectral Knights are captured and enslaved, Marna realizes that freedom at the expense of others is wrong. She then assists in freeing the Knights and helping them drive the Darkling Lords out of New Valarak.

=== Sun Imps ===
The Sun Imps are diminutive and mischievous creatures who appear in the final episode of the animated series. They were imprisoned inside an underground tomb after causing much havoc during the first Age of Magic, but earthquakes have exposed the tomb over time, prompting Merklynn to send the Visionaries to rebury it. Cindarr is tricked by his fellow Darkling Lord Lexor into releasing the creatures, which leads to a frantic attempt by both factions to recapture them.

- Abraxas (voiced by Neil Ross) is a Wizard Imp who can reflect spells onto their caster. He is outwitted by Merklynn with a "Capture Thyself" spell that is reversed and leads to Abraxas' capture.
- Gorge (voiced by Peter Cullen) is a Pig Imp who can turn ground to mud and force pigs to stampede. His weakness is gluttony, which the Visionaries exploit by tricking him into overindulging himself.
- Growl is a Cat Imp who can control felines and generate sonic waves, allowing him to cause landslides and break windows. Cindarr uses his power of Destruction to recapture him.
- Knightmare (voiced by Hal Rayle) is a Dream Imp who can hypnotize others and uses a hammer to quickly knock them out. He is caught after being dizzied to the extent that he knocks himself out.
- Mysto is a Fish Imp who can turn ground to ice and control fish. Galadria and Virulina work together in their animal forms to trap him underwater inside a treasure chest.
- Shaggy is a Hair Imp who can cause hair to grow rapidly, which he uses to humiliate Darkstorm, but he cannot use his powers if his own hair is cut, and he is consequently converged upon with oversized shaving implements.

== Action figures ==
In 1987, Hasbro produced a set of figures after the cartoon series ended. The figures had hologram stickers on both their chests and staffs, which resulted in their being expensive to produce. The toyline lasted one year, with figures of the twelve male characters produced along with four vehicles that were packaged with an exclusive figure. A second wave of characters was planned for release in 1988 but were never released due to the cartoon and the toyline's cancellation.

Around the 2017 San Diego Comic-Con, a new action figure of Leoric was released at the convention and later at HasbroToyShop.com in limited quantities as part of the SDCC exclusive IDW Revolution set alongside Jetfire, Roadblock, Rom the Space Knight, a Dire Wraith, characters from the Micronauts, Matt Trakker and Action Man.

In 2026, Super7 incorporated Visionaries into their ReAction+ action figure line.

== TV series ==
In the UK, when the series was released on VHS, on five volumes, in the 80s, under the distributor Video Gems, "The Trail of Three Wizards" was only broadcast and never commercially released.

=== Episodes ===
No.	Title	Written by	DVD	Continuity	Original release date
1	"The Age of Magic Begins"	Flint Dille	01	01	September 20, 1987
When technology fails on the planet Prysmos, an Age of Magic begins. As the world descends into chaos, the knights of Prysmos embark on a quest to conquer Iron Mountain, lured by the wizard Merklynn's promise of magical powers, but only fourteen succeed and it soon becomes clear that several of them joined the quest for personal gain.
2	"The Dark Hand of Treachery"	Flint Dille	02	02	September 27, 1987
Darkstorm and his fellow Darkling Lords, aided by magical vehicles, trap Leoric and his followers one by one. Imprisoned in the dungeon at Darkstorm's castle and stripped of their weapons, Leoric and his followers seem to be in a hopeless situation. Soon, however, Leoric realises they must unite and names them the Spectral Knights.
3	"Quest for the Dragon's Eye"	Flint Dille	03	03	October 4, 1987
After escaping from Castle Darkstorm and acquiring magical vehicles of their own, the Spectral Knights capture the Darkling Lords and put them to work in a factory. Shortly afterwards, however, the Darkling Lords escape and ambush the Spectral Knights, who are heading to Merklynn's shrine to have their power staff recharged, but in exchange for more magic, they must bring Merklynn the Dragon's Eye.
4	"The Price of Freedom"	Douglas Booth	04	04	November 8, 1987
The Darkling Lords encounter a city whose inhabitants are reluctant to give up their Age of Technology lifestyle. Lured by Darkstorm's promise to give them human slaves to replace the robots which used to do all the work in the city, the people infiltrate New Valarak and enslave the Spectral Knights, but the Spectral Knights find an ally in a woman who feels that freedom at the expense of others is wrong.
5	"Feryl Steps Out"	Buzz Dixon	05	05	October 11, 1987
Dejected after getting into difficulties during a battle with pirates, Feryl leaves the Spectral Knights. Darkstorm tries to turn the situation to his advantage and, after an initial attempt to enlist Feryl in the Darkling Lords fails, lures Leoric into a trap by making him think Feryl's life is in danger. Feryl soon learns what has happened and trails the Darkling Lords to Castle Darkstorm.
6	"Lion Hunt"	Buzz Dixon	06	07	October 18, 1987
The Darkling Lords seek the aid of an old witch, who gives them a potion which will trap Leoric in his animal form. Unable to revert to human form, Leoric soon finds himself under attack from the Darkling Lords, a group of superstitious villagers and even his fellow Spectral Knights, who believe he has been killed. When the Spectral Knights discover the truth, they face a race against time to restore their leader to normal.
7	"The Overthrow of Merklynn"	Flint Dille	07	09	October 25, 1987
Tired of constantly having to answer to Merklynn, Darkstorm deposes the wizard and seizes control of Iron Mountain. He quickly becomes overconfident and unleashes a spell which triggers a series of violent cataclysms. Believing that Prysmos will be destroyed unless the spell can be broken, the Darkling Lords are forced to seek out Merklynn and free him from the Wizards' Jail to which Darkstorm banished him.
8	"The Power of the Wise"	Douglas Booth	08	06	November 1, 1987
The Spectral Knights are afraid of being rapidly aged by the power of Darkstorm's staff and, when Merklynn refuses to help them, set off on a quest to find a magic spring whose waters have rejuvenating properties. During the quest, Leoric falls victim to Darkstorm's staff and, to ensure he cannot be restored to his true age, the Darkling Lords destroy the spring, but the experience teaches Leoric that there is more to old age than being weak and feeble.
9	"Horn of Unicorn, Claw of Dragon"	Buzz Dixon	09	08	November 15, 1987
A magical plague strikes Prysmos, leaving Visionaries from both sides close to death. Their only hope of survival is a spell, the key ingredients of which are a unicorn's horn and a dragon's claw. Witterquick and Arzon must team up with Lexor and Cindarr and set off on a quest for these ingredients, but also try to fulfil their mission without taking any lives.
10	"The Trail of Three Wizards"	Flint Dille	10	10	November 22, 1987
Merklynn sends the Spectral Knights to the Anarchy Zone to round up three rogue wizards, but, just as they have completed their mission, the Darkling Lords ambush them. Releasing one of the wizards as a diversion, the Spectral Knights return to Iron Mountain, where Merklynn sends one of the wizards to the Wizards' Jail and proves the second wizard is innocent. The Spectral Knights then return to the Anarchy Zone to recapture the remaining wizard, who is heading to the Lost Shrine with the Darkling Lords.
11	"Sorcery Squared"	Douglas Booth	11	12	December 6, 1987
Cryotek is captured by the Darkling Lords, who try to remove his totem power. Instead, he ends up with Cravex's Totem in addition to his own and starts behaving strangely as the two totems fight for control. Learning what has happened, the Spectral Knights and Darkling Lords reluctantly put aside their differences until he is found and Cravex's totem can be removed from him.
12	"Honor Among Thieves"	Flint Dille	12	11	November 29, 1987
Merklynn gives the Spectral Knights a magic crystal which will warn them of impending danger, but Darkstorm soon learns that the crystal can be neutralized by an enemy who is wearing a "Cloak of Concealment". After Reekon infiltrates New Valarak and steals the crystal, Ectar and Arzon are forced into a dangerous game of subterfuge in order to get it back.
13	"Dawn of the Sun Imps"	Flint Dille	13	13	December 13, 1987
Learning that a tomb imprisoning six mischievous imps has been exposed, Merklynn sends the Visionaries to rebury it, but Lexor tricks Cindarr into freeing the creatures, who proceed to wreak havoc on both factions. The Spectral Knights and Darkling Lords are forced to work together in order to recapture the imps and return them to their tomb.

=== Home media ===
The complete thirteen-episode series was released on DVD in the United Kingdom in 2004 by Metrodome Distribution, and included a special feature of a set of PDF files of the complete scripts to each episode.

== Adaptations ==
=== Comics ===
==== Marvel Comics ====
Marvel's Star Comics imprint published a bimonthly miniseries beginning in November 1987 that was cancelled midway through a four-part adventure in September 1988 after only six issues. The first issue was an adaptation of the first episode, "The Age of Magic Begins", but subsequent issues took the storyline in a different direction with changes from the animated series such as characters having unlimited use of their power staffs, with Witterquick and Cindarr combining the powers of their staffs to defeat an enemy in one issue. The animal totems were depicted in their natural forms instead of the two factions' representative blue or green.

Issue No.	Title	Summary	Published
01	The End...	The technologically advanced world of Prysmos is suddenly thrown into a dark age. The wizard Merklynn offers magical powers to knights across the planet who can penetrate Iron Mountain. Fourteen knights complete the quest and are rewarded with animal totems and power staffs. This issue adapted the teleplay of the premiere episode of the animated series.	November 1987
02	The Balance of Power	The Visionaries begin fighting each other with their new powers before dividing into two factions. As the Darkling Lords search for a secret weapon, Reekon and Mortdredd discover they can magically power vehicles. On his own initiative, Mortdredd attacks the Spectral Knights in the Sky Claw, which ends in disaster.	January 1988
03	The Star Stone	The Spectral Knights learn of a long-buried doomsday weapon that will reverse the scientific principles of the planet. Realizing this could return Prysmos to the Age of Science, both sides vie for control of it, with the resulting battle burying the weapon forever.	March 1988
04	Dream Maker	The dreams of Witterquick and Cindarr are filled with a vision of an imprisoned woman, Sirena, who begs for their aid. They both quest to rescue her, fighting each other, finding the key and defeating the guardian. Learning that Sirena is an evil witch, the two knights unite their powers to defeat her.	May 1988
05	Quest of the Four Talismans	The first of an intended four-part miniseries. Merklynn divides the Visionaries into teams to quest for four magical talismans: Earth, Air, Fire and Water. Galadria and Cryotek find the Earth talisman, but it is jealously guarded by a tribe who worship it as a god. Cravex and Reekon goad the people into attacking the Spectral Knights, making off with the talisman in the confusion. In the aftermath, Galadria uses her new healing powers to heal the wounds of the now-penitent tribe.	July 1988
06	Wings	Part two of the miniseries. Arzon and Feryl discover the Air Talisman is possessed by the High Flyers of Avitrix, people able to fly with artificial wings. Virulina and Cindarr attack, using Virulina's new power of disease to sicken the whole tribe. Arzon's power of wisdom is able to cure the High Flyers, who drive away the Darkling Lords and give the Air Talisman to the Spectral Knights. Arzon speculates about the truth of the talismans. The series was canceled with two parts remaining, leaving the storyline unresolved.	September 1988

==== IDW Publishing ====
IDW Publishing released a five-issue Transformers vs. Visionaries miniseries in 2018, written by Magdalene Visaggio and illustrated by Fico Ossio.

=== Film ===
In 2015, Hasbro and Paramount Pictures were planning a cinematic universe combining Visionaries: Knights of the Magical Light with G.I. Joe, Micronauts, M.A.S.K., and Rom. A writers' room was formed consisting of Michael Chabon, Brian K. Vaughan, Nicole Perlman, Cheo Hodari Coker, John Francis Daley, and others to develop storylines, but it disbanded in 2017.
