= Vice Girls =

- Directed by: Richard Gabai
- Written by: A. Michael Baldwin
- Produced by: Angela L Baynes
- Starring: Lana Clarkson
- Cinematography: Gary Graver
- Production company: Sunset Films International
- Distributed by: Concorde Pictures; New City Releasing
- Release date: April 30, 1997
- Country: United States
- Language: English

Vice Girls is a 1997 American crime drama film directed by Richard Gabai and starring Lana Clarkson.

It was made by Sunset Films, the film production company of Jim Wynorski and Cinetel, and was released through Concorde Pictures.

== Premise ==
Three policewomen go undercover to try and trap a serial killer.

== Cast ==
- Lana Clarkson as Jan Cooper
- Liat Goodson as Edith Block
- Kimberley Roberts as Mindy Turner
- Bart Muller as John Russo

== Reception ==
B movie expert Joe Bob Briggs has described Vice Girls as "the goofy story of three babe cops on the trail of a serial killer", where policewomen "pose as strippers, wearing a special black-leather bra with Nipple Lenses attached to a secret camera, as they smoke out the killer." According to Phil Spector's biographer Mick Brown, Clarkson's performance in Vice Girls was one of several "schlock movies" that led to her becoming recognized as a B movie star "with a large and devoted fan base".
