= Lana Clarkson =

American actress and fashion model (1962–2003)

- Clarkson in a promotional photo
- Born: Lana Jean Clarkson; April 5, 1962; Long Beach, California, U.S.
- Died: February 3, 2003 (aged 40); Alhambra, California, U.S.
- Cause of death: Gunshot wound (details)
- Occupations: Actress; model
- Years active: 1982–2003
- Known for: Deathstalker (1983); Barbarian Queen (1985)

Lana Jean Clarkson (April 5, 1962 – February 3, 2003) was an American actress and fashion model. During the 1980s, she rose to prominence in several sword and sorcery films. In 2003, record producer and songwriter Phil Spector murdered Clarkson inside his home; of which he was charged and convicted in 2009.

== Early life ==
Lana Jean Clarkson was born April 5, 1962, in Long Beach, California, to Donna and James M. Clarkson and was raised in the hills of Sonoma County, California, from a young age. She had a brother, Jessee J. Clarkson, and a sister, Fawn. While living in Northern California, she attended Cloverdale High School and Pacific Union College Preparatory School. During the Christmas season of 1978, Clarkson's family returned to Southern California and settled in the San Fernando Valley region of Los Angeles. After Clarkson's family moved back to Los Angeles County, California, she pursued a career in the entertainment industry as an actress and fashion model.

== Career ==
In the early 1980s, Clarkson landed bit parts in film and television. She co-starred with rocker Donnie Iris in the 1980 music video for his signature song "Ah! Leah!" She made her screen debut as a minor character in Fast Times at Ridgemont High (1982), director Amy Heckerling's coming-of-age comedy. She played the wife of science teacher Mr. Vargas (Vincent Schiavelli). The film was her first speaking role. She appeared in Scarface (1983) behind Michelle Pfeiffer dancing on the floor of the Babylon Club. Her first big role was in the Nico Mastorakis science-fiction thriller Blind Date (1984).

As an actress, Clarkson became best known for her five feature films for producer Roger Corman, beginning with his fantasy film Deathstalker (1983), as a female warrior and love interest to the title character played by Richard Hill. Corman oriented his films towards young male viewers, using a mix of action and female nudity. Clarkson's work in Deathstalker led to her being offered the title role in Corman's next film, Barbarian Queen (1985), a role Corman referred to as "the original Xena" because of the parallel in featuring a strong female leading character in an action-oriented, sword-swinging role.

In 1987, Clarkson appeared in the John Landis spoof Amazon Women on the Moon. Following that, Clarkson starred in Corman's Barbarian Queen sequel, Barbarian Queen II: The Empress Strikes Back.

Clarkson starred as a supporting character in the period horror film The Haunting of Morella (1990) as the evil attendant to a young woman played by model/actress Nicole Eggert. In the film, Clarkson played a dominating lesbian, who tries to resurrect the spirit of a witch burned at the stake during the Salem witch trials. In her final film for Corman, Vice Girls (1996), Clarkson played one of three cops who posed as strippers to catch a serial killer.

Clarkson's work in the B movie sci-fi genre inspired a cult following, making her a favorite at comic-book conventions, where she made some promotional appearances signing autographs for her fans. She appeared in numerous other B movies, as well as a range of television spots. She also appeared in commercials for Mercedes-Benz, Kmart, Nike, Mattel, and Anheuser-Busch. Her television appearances include parts on Night Court, Silk Stalkings, Riptide, Three's Company, Knight Rider, and Wings, and a guest appearance as a villain on the television adaptation of Corman's film Black Scorpion in what was her final role.

Clarkson traveled around the United States and Europe while working on fashion photo shoots. Other projects took her to Japan, Greece, Argentina, Italy, Switzerland, France, Jamaica, and Mexico.

In the 1980s, she volunteered weekly at the AIDS charity Project Angel Food, which delivers food for those in Los Angeles disabled by HIV or AIDS, at a time when the disease was greatly feared by the general public.

Clarkson's career stalled as she approached her 30s. Unable to earn a living as an actress, Clarkson sought alternative sources of income, including operating her own website on which she sold autographed DVDs of her films and communicated directly with her fans on her own message board. Although she made a living playing sex symbols, Clarkson wished to be a comic actress or perform as a comedian. Her publicist friend Edward Lozzi told Vanity Fair writer Dominick Dunne that Clarkson had been working on a stand-up comedy act that he had witnessed.

In 2001, while living in Venice, California, for the last several years, Clarkson developed, wrote, produced, and directed a showcase reel titled Lana Unleashed. She took a part-time side job as a hostess in early January 2003 at the House of Blues in West Hollywood, California, to make ends meet.

== Murder ==
On February 3, 2003, Clarkson was found dead in the mansion belonging to record producer Phil Spector. In the early hours of that morning, she met Spector while working at the House of Blues in Los Angeles. They left the House of Blues in Spector's limousine and drove to his mansion. Spector and Clarkson went inside, while his driver waited outside in the car. About an hour later, the driver heard a gunshot before Spector exited his house through the back door with a gun. He was quoted as saying, according to affidavits, "I think I just shot her." Spector later said Clarkson's death was an "accidental suicide" and that she "kissed the gun".

Spector appeared in court charged with the murder of Clarkson in 2007. On September 26, 2007, the trial judge declared mistrial due to a hung jury, ten to two for conviction. Spector was retried, and in April 2009, he was convicted of second-degree murder. Spector was sentenced on May 29, 2009, to 19 years to life in state prison. He died in 2021 while serving his sentence.

In February 2012, Donna Clarkson, Lana's mother, settled a civil lawsuit with Spector and his insurance company over the wrongful death of Lana Clarkson. Terms of the settlement were not released to the public.

== Filmography ==
=== Film ===
| Year | Title | Role | Notes | Ref. |
|---|---|---|---|---|
| 1982 | My Favorite Year | Girl in Old Gold Cigarette Pack | Uncredited | |
| 1982 | Fast Times at Ridgemont High | Mrs. Vargas | | |
| 1983 | Deathstalker | Kaira | Alternative title: Warrior King | |
| 1983 | Brainstorm | Food Fantasy Girl | Uncredited | |
| 1983 | Scarface | Woman at Babylon Club #6 | Extra | |
| 1983 | Female Mercenaries | | | |
| 1984 | Blind Date | Rachel | | |
| 1985 | Barbarian Queen | Amethea | | |
| 1987 | Amazon Women on the Moon | Alpha Beta | (segment "Amazon Women on the Moon") | |
| 1989 | Wizards of the Lost Kingdom II | Amathea | | |
| 1990 | The Haunting of Morella | Coel | | |
| 1990 | Barbarian Queen II: The Empress Strikes Back | Princess Athalia | Direct-to-video release | |
| 1997 | Vice Girls | Jan Cooper | | |
| 1997 | Love in Paris | Woman at Fashion Show | Alternative title: Another 9½ Weeks | |
| 1997 | Retroactive | | Stunt performer | |
| 2000 | Little Man on Campus | Joyce | Short | |
| 2000 | March | Dr. Ellen Taylor | (final film role) | |

=== Television ===
| Year | Title | Role | Notes | Ref. |
|---|---|---|---|---|
| 1983 | Three's Company | Sharon Gordon | Episode: "Alias Jack Tripper" | |
| 1983 | The Jeffersons | Sofia | Episode: "Who's the Fairest?" | |
| 1984 | Brothers | Vanessa | Episode: "Fear of Flying" | |
| 1984 | The New Mike Hammer | Masseuse | Episode: "Kill Devil" | |
| 1984 | Riptide | Kelly | Episode: "Catch of the Day" | |
| 1984 | Knight Rider | Marilyn | Episode: "The Rotten Apples" | |
| 1984 | Who's the Boss? | Nanette | Episode: "Sports Buddies" | |
| 1985 | The A-Team | Sonny Monroe's Girlfriend | Episode: "Champ!" | |
| 1985 | George Burns Comedy Week | Librarian | Episode: "Disaster at Buzz Creek" | |
| 1985, 1990 | Night Court | Miss Corland / Carey | 2 episodes | |
| 1986 | Hotel | Sheila Carlson | Episode: "Hidden Talents" | |
| 1986 | Amazing Stories | Mrs. Ellis | Episode: "Miscalculation" | |
| 1986 | The Love Boat | Angela | Episode: "The Shipshape Cruise" | |
| 1988 | It's a Living | Fawn | Episode: "Skin Deep" | |
| 1992 | Wings | Janine | Episode: "Noses Off" | |
| 1993, 1995 | Silk Stalkings | Ula Kurtz / Angela Martin | 2 episodes | |
| 1996 | Night Stand with Dick Dietrick | Jamie | Episode: "Getting Even" | |
| 1996 | Land's End | Kay | Episode: "Who's Killing Cole Porter?" | |
| 2000 | 18 Wheels of Justice | Marta | Episode: "Revelation" | |
| 2001 | Black Scorpion | Dr. Sarah Bellum / Mindbender | Episode: "Virtual Vice" | |
| 2001 | James Dean | Jayne Mansfield | Television film, uncredited | |
