= Bernard Erhard =

American actor

- Erhard in 1981
- Born: February 6, 1934
- Died: November 1, 2000 (aged 66)
- Occupations: Actor, voice artist

Bernard Erhard (February 6, 1934 – November 1, 2000) was an American actor.

== Career ==
Early in his career, Erhard worked as a music teacher at the University of Southwestern Louisiana (USL), and directed numerous theater productions there.

As a stage actor, he performed in the original 1975 production of David Mamet's American Buffalo in Chicago.

In cinema, he appeared in Walking the Edge (1985) and Say Yes (1986), and played the lead villain, Munkar, in the low-budget classic B film Deathstalker (1983).

He served as the referee on the medieval-themed television game show Knights and Warriors, under the moniker LORD ("Lord Of the Rules and Discipline").

He also worked as a voice actor in many children's cartoons. Among his roles were Cy-Kill in Challenge of the GoBots, Time Slime in The 13 Ghosts of Scooby-Doo, King Morpheus in Little Nemo: Adventures in Slumberland, Cryotek in Visionaries: Knights of the Magical Light and one of the wolves in Rover Dangerfield.

== Filmography ==
Year	Title	Role	Notes
1973	The Filthiest Show in Town		
1982	Firefox	KGB Guard	
1983	Deathstalker	Munkar	
1984	Satan's Touch		
1985	Walking the Edge	Fat Man	
1986	GoBots: Battle of the Rock Lords	Cy-Kill	Voice
1986	Say Yes	Dandy	
1989	Little Nemo: Adventures in Slumberland	King Morpheus	Voice
1991	Rover Dangerfield	Wolf	Voice
