= Miguel Zavaleta =

Argentine musician and songwriter (1955–2026)

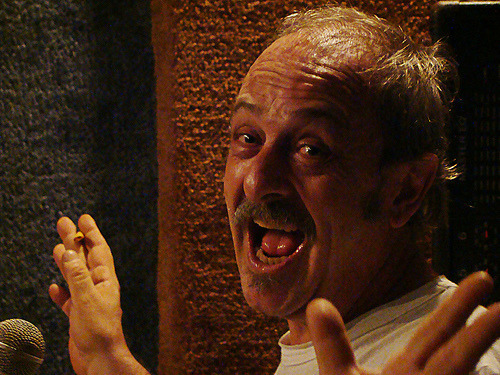
- Zavaleta in 2007

Background information
- Born: February 16, 1955; Buenos Aires, Argentina
- Died: August 31, 2026 (aged 71)
- Genres: Rock, pop rock, new wave
- Occupations: Musician, songwriter and singer
- Instruments: Piano and vocals

Miguel Zavaleta (February 16, 1955 – August 31, 2026) was an Argentine musician, singer, and composer of Argentinian rock. He led the new wave and rock group Suéter between 1981 and 2007.

== Life and career ==
Zavaleta was the author of most of the successes of Suéter, including: "Amanece en la ruta", "Él anda diciendo", "Comiendo gefilte fish", "Desvanecidos" and "Extraño ser".

After the breakup of the band, Zavaleta, began his solo career with his first album titled No sé, quizás, suerte, released independently in 2011. It was produced by Palo Pandolfo and Mario Breuer. This disc was not recorded in any record company, so the artist had to hang it on the Internet.

In addition to his solo career, he participated in over twenty-five recordings of other artists, including: Charly Garcia, Fito Paez, Fabiana Cantilo, Los Twist, Los Auténticos Decadentes, Bersuit Vergarabat, among others.

He had a small role in the US–Argentina co-production film, entitled The Warrior and the Sorceress in 1984, as a Zeg's Guard and was credited as "Michael Zane".

Zavaleta died in August 31, 2026, at the age of 71.

== Discography ==
=== Suéter ===
- Suéter: La reserva moral de Occidente (1982)
- Lluvia de gallinas (1984)
- 20 caras bonitas (1985)
- Misión ciudadano 1 (1987)
- Sueter 5 (1995)

=== Soloist ===
- No lo sé, suerte quizás (2011)
- Volver a nacer (2019)
