= Suéter =

Argentine rock band

- Origin: Buenos Aires, Argentina
- Genres: Argentine rock, new wave, pop rock, reggae, space rock
- Years active: 1981–1989; 1994–1995; 2002–2007
- Labels: 20th Century Records; PolyGram; Interdisc
- Past members: Miguel Zavaleta (vocals and keyboards); Gustavo Donés (bass); Juan del Barrio (keyboards); Jorge Minissale (guitar and vocals)

Suéter (in English: Sweater) was an Argentine rock band formed in mid-1981. The group has contributed to many classics in its country's popular songbook, such as "Amanece en la ruta", "Él anda diciendo", "Comiendo gefilte fish", "Vía México" and "Extraño ser".

== History ==
Led by Miguel Zavaleta, it also was initially built by Fabiana Cantilo and Celsa Mel Gowland as showgirls. They Juan del Barrio (es) (keyboards) and Gustavo Donés (bass) were added, training with whom they recorded the first album. They had the support of Charly García who was invited as the opening act, but the public initially rejected.

Gradually they reached some recognition and some massive hits like "Vía México", a song from 1985, on the illegality of divorce, at a time when the country was preparing to establish the law permitting it.

In 1987, Miguel left the band to try a solo career without much success. Returning in 1994, with a renewed lineup and Miguel Zavaleta training as only original member (with Diego Chorno on guitar and keyboards; Jorge Álvarez on drums and Raúl Chevalier on bass, later replaced by Laura Gómez Palma).

In 2003, the original lineup that had recorded the first album in 1982 (Zavaleta, Dones, Minissale, del Barrio) with drummer meets Hernán "Fresa" Robic. The band stays together until 8 December 2007. Gustavo Donés dies, due to internal conflict and the group broke up shortly after leaving a new unreleased album.

== Members ==
- Drums: Daniel Colombres (1981–1983), Claudio "Pato" Loza in (1985–1987) and Claudio Venier (1987)
- Bass: Edgardo Roggati (Buenos Aires, Argentina, 4 April 1954 – Ibid, 20 October 2003) – (1981), Gustavo Donés (27 April 1953 – 8 December 2007) – (1981, 1989, 2003, 2007), Edgardo Folino (1951–1996) – (1981).
- Guitar: Jorge Minissale (4 March 1959 – ) – (1981, 1986, 2003, 2007), José Luis "Sarten" Asaresi (Province of Santa Fe, Argentina, circa, 1958 – Geneva, Switzerland, 2 November 2011) – (1987–1989)
- Keyboard and voice: Miguel Zavaleta, (16 February 1955 – 31 August 2026) (1981–2007)
- Keyboard: Juan del Barrio (1981, 1983, 2002, 2007), Alejandro Desilvestre (1962 -) – (1985–1986)

== Discography ==
=== Studio albums ===
- Suéter: La reserva moral de Occidente (1982)
- Lluvia de gallinas (1984)
- 20 caras bonitas (1985)
- Misión ciudadano 1 (1987)
- Sueter 5 (1995)

=== Compilation ===
- Suéter Completo (1988)
- Elefantes en el techo (1997)

== See also ==
- Argentine rock
- Fabiana Cantilo
- Charly García
