= Joe Fowler (television personality) =

American sportscaster and infomercial pitchman

Joe Fowler is an American sportscaster, actor, and infomercial pitchman who has worked for KSAT-TV, WTTG, WCAU, KCAL-TV, and the World Wrestling Federation.

== Career ==
Fowler attended American University from 1976 to 1977, but left school to become an announcer for the San Antonio Dodgers. In 1980, he became the weekend sports anchor at San Antonio's KSAT-TV, and quickly became the station's sports director. In 1984 he moved to New York City to pursue an acting career. He appeared in the Sylvester Stallone film Cobra and on HBO's First and Ten.

Unable to make ends meet as an actor, Fowler took a part-time job at KMOX-TV in St. Louis. In 1986 he replaced Bernie Smilovitz as the sports anchor on WTTG-TV's The Ten O'Clock News. After a stint at Philadelphia's WCAU-TV, Fowler became a reporter for KCAL-TV in Los Angeles. While there, he appeared in two episodes of Coach as sportscaster Bob Clifton. He also hosted Tuesday Night Muscle, a weekly women's bodybuilding show, on ESPN. In 1992 he hosted Knights and Warriors, a syndicated American Gladiators-type show produced by Welk Entertainment Group.

In 1993, Fowler joined the World Wrestling Federation as a replacement for interviewer Gene Okerlund. He made his debut at that year's SummerSlam pay-per-view and was released after only 10 weeks with the company.

In 1994, Fowler hosted Maximum Drive on The Family Channel. He has since worked as an infomercial pitchman, advertising such products as the Lizard Hose and the Omelette Express, and hosted programming for ShopHQ.
