= Murder of Lana Clarkson =

2003 murder by Phil Spector

- Clarkson in a promotional photo
- Location: 34.0738°N 118.1550°W; Pyrenees Castle, 1700 Grandview Drive, Alhambra, California, U.S.
- Date: February 3, 2003 c. 5:00 a.m. (U.S. Pacific time (UTC−08:00))
- Attack type: Second-degree murder
- Weapon: .38 caliber Colt Cobra revolver
- Victim: Lana Clarkson
- Perpetrator: Phil Spector
- Motive: Unknown

On the morning of February 3, 2003, forty-year-old American actress Lana Clarkson was found dead inside the Pyrenees Castle, the Alhambra, California, mansion of record producer and songwriter Phil Spector. In the early hours of that morning, Clarkson had met Spector while working at the House of Blues in Los Angeles.

Spector was tried for the murder of Clarkson in 2007. On September 26 of that year, a mistrial was declared due to a hung jury, with ten jurors of twelve favoring conviction. He was tried again for second-degree murder beginning on October 20, 2008. On April 13, 2009, the jury found Spector guilty of murdering Clarkson. On May 29, 2009, he was sentenced to 19 years to life in state prison. Spector died in a prison hospital in January 2021.

== Murder ==
In the early hours of February 3, 2003, Clarkson met record producer Phil Spector while working at the House of Blues in Los Angeles. The two were driven in Spector's limousine to his mansion, the Pyrenees Castle, in Alhambra, California, and went inside while his driver waited in the car.

Later that morning Clarkson was found dead in the mansion. Her body was found slumped in a chair with a single gunshot wound to her mouth with broken teeth scattered over the carpet. Spector's driver, Adriano de Souza, said Spector came out of the house holding a gun and said "I think I killed someone". Spector's fingerprints were not on the supposed murder weapon.

According to the prosecution, Spector had previously pulled a gun on four women. In each case, he had been drinking and was romantically interested in the woman, but grew angry after the woman spurned him. The prosecution alleged that on each occasion, he pointed a gun at the woman to prevent her from walking out. The prosecution argued that the testimony of the other women was important in demonstrating a "common plan or scheme". The defense sought to prevent the women from providing such testimony. Though the law generally forbids the introduction of evidence showing a defendant's previous transgressions, the judge ruled the testimony "can be used to show lack of accident or mistake".

== Trials ==
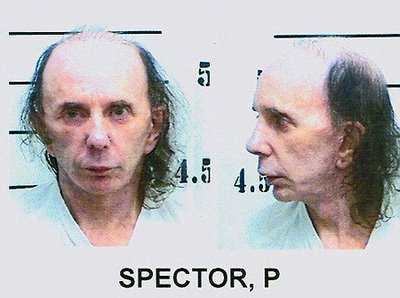
2009 mug shot

Spector remained free on $1 million bail while awaiting trial, which began on March 19, 2007. Presiding Judge Larry Paul Fidler allowed the proceedings in Los Angeles Superior Court to be televised. At the start of the trial, the defense forensic expert Henry Lee was accused of hiding crucial evidence that the district attorney's office claimed could prove Spector's guilt. On September 26, 2007, Judge Fidler declared a mistrial because of a hung jury (ten to two for conviction).

Before and during the first trial, Spector went through at least three sets of attorneys. Defense attorney Robert Shapiro represented Spector at the arraignment and early pretrial hearings and achieved his release on $1 million bail. Bruce Cutler represented him during the 2007 trial, but withdrew on August 27, 2007, claiming "a difference of opinion between Mr. Spector and me on strategy". Attorney Linda Kenney Baden then became lead lawyer for closing arguments.

The retrial of Spector for murder in the second degree began on October 20, 2008, with Judge Fidler again presiding; this time it was not televised. The case went to the jury on March 26, 2009, and nineteen days later, on April 13, the jury returned a guilty verdict. Additionally, Spector was found guilty of using a firearm in the commission of a crime, which added four years to the sentence. Spector was immediately taken into custody and was sentenced, on May 29, 2009, to 19 years to life in the California state prison system.

== Appeals ==
The California Second District Court of Appeal affirmed Spector's conviction in May 2011 and denied his request for a rehearing of the appeal shortly thereafter. On August 17, 2011, the California Supreme Court declined to review the court of appeal's decision to affirm his conviction.

In December 2011, Spector's attorneys petitioned for review by the U.S. Supreme Court, arguing that his constitutional due process rights were violated when prosecutors used the trial judge's comments about an expert's testimony, effectively making the judge a witness for the prosecution. Spector's attorney Dennis Riordan argued the constitutional right to confront witnesses did not permit the prosecution to introduce at trial a videotape of statements made by the judge at a pretrial hearing that were never subjected to cross examination. In February 2012, the Supreme Court denied the petition.

In July 2013, Attorney Dennis Riordan filed a petition with a US Magistrate urging prompt action due to Spector's ill health. In June 2015, Federal Magistrate Judge Paul L. Abrams recommended denial of Spector's habeas corpus petition and dismissal of the appeal. The dismissal was ordered the following month by District Judge S. James Otero, who also denied Spector's request to certify the case for further appeal to the Ninth Circuit Court of Appeals. In August 2015, Spector's lawyers filed another motion for a certificate of appealability to the Ninth Circuit.

Spector died from COVID-19 complications on January 16, 2021, while he was serving his sentence at the California Health Care Facility, California State Prison (Stockton, California). He would have been eligible for parole in 2024.

== Films inspired by the case ==
- The Agony and the Ecstasy of Phil Spector, a television documentary directed by Vikram Jayanti, premiered on BBC Two in mid-April 2008. It consists of Spector's first screen interview—breaking a long period of media silence. During the conversation, images from his first murder trial are juxtaposed with live appearances of his tracks on television programs from the 1960s and 1970s, along with subtitles giving critical interpretation of some of his song production values. While Jayanti does not take a position on Spector's guilt, the court case proceedings shown try to give further explanation of the facts surrounding the murder charges leveled against the producer. Spector also speaks about his life in the music business.
- Phil Spector, a 2013 HBO film written and directed by David Mamet and starring Al Pacino as Spector and Helen Mirren as defense attorney Linda Kenney Baden, depicts a fictionalized account of the murder and first trial. The film drew criticism from Clarkson's family and friends, who charged that the suicide defense was given more merit than it deserved, and also from Spector's wife Rachelle Spector, who argued that Spector was portrayed as a "foul-mouthed megalomaniac" and a "minotaur".
