= Jonathan Farwell =

American actor (1932–2025)

- Born: January 9, 1932; Lansing, Michigan, U.S.
- Died: November 22, 2025 (aged 93); Fort Collins, Colorado, U.S.
- Education: Ithaca College
- Occupation: Actor
- Years active: 1962–2011
- Spouses: Joerle Gaines (m. 1955; sep. 1977); Deb Note (m. 1994; died 2018)
- Children: 2

Jonathan Farwell (January 9, 1932 – November 22, 2025) was an American film, television and Broadway actor. He is best known for his soap opera role as George Rawlins on the CBS daytime drama The Young and the Restless.

== Life and career ==
Jonathan Farwell was born on January 9, 1932, in Lansing, Michigan, to Arthur Farwell, a composer, and Gertrude Everts Brice, an actress. He served in the United States Air Force. He attended Ithaca College and briefly pursued postgraduate studies at Yale University. He married actress Joerle Anne Gaines (professionally known as Jo Farwell) on July 23, 1955. They had two children together: Alison Beatrice Farwell (b. 1958) and Elisabeth Evelyn Farwell (b. 1961). They separated in 1977, but were never divorced.

Farwell is perhaps best-known for the role of George Rawlins on the daytime CBS soap opera The Young and the Restless (TV series).

While working on location in a production of Shadowlands in 1994, Jonathan Farwell's first wife died of breast cancer. He met his next wife, Deb Note, in a production of The King and I in which they both appeared. They married onstage after a Sunday matinee in 1994. Deb Note-Farwell died from cancer in 2018.

Farwell died from complications of a hip fracture at a hospice in Fort Collins, Colorado, on November 22, 2025, at the age of 93.

== Selected filmography ==
| Year | Film | Role | Other notes |
|---|---|---|---|
| 1985 | All My Children (TV series) | Mr. Kyle | |
| 1988 | Star Trek: The Next Generation | Captain Walker Keel | |
| 1988–1990 | The Young and the Restless (TV series) | George Rawlins | |
