= John Broderick (producer) =

American film producer

- Born: John C. Broderick; October 22, 1942; San Francisco, California, United States
- Died: June 17, 2001 (aged 58); Santa Monica, California, United States
- Occupations: Film director, film producer, screenwriter

John C. Broderick (October 22, 1942, in San Francisco, California – June 17, 2001, in Santa Monica, California) was an American film director, producer, screenwriter and entertainer.

He is mostly known for the sword and sorcery film The Warrior and the Sorceress.

== Biography ==
John's entertainment career began as a high school student actor in South San Francisco and while at college worked as a member of the San Francisco Mime Troupe. He performed in the Troupe's award-winning production of A Minstrel Show (or Civil Rights in a Cracker Barrel) He attended film schools in Sweden and London, and returned to the US to ply his trade. Initially he directed underground films in New York City and then moved on to a producing, directing, acting and editing career in Hollywood.

He worked on a wide range of films, including The Exorcist (1973, supervising editor, for which he received an Oscar nomination), Six Pack Annie (1975, director), Down and Out in Beverly Hills (1986, production manager) and Monkey Trouble (1994, production manager and co-producer).

He met his wife, Eunice (Neecee), when he was in Brazil during the filming of Moon over Parador. They lived in Malibu, California.

Broderick died in Santa Monica, California, on June 17, 2001. He had kidney disease for several years.

== Partial filmography ==
Year	Title	Role	Notes
1974	Summer Run		(aka: "Harry", "Backpack Girls, The"
1974	Big Bad Mama	Bound waiter	Uncredited
1975	Capone	Maitre d'	
1988	Moon over Parador	Director	
1998	A Bedfull of Foreigners	Tony Calabrese	(final film role)
