= Deathstalker (1983 film) =

1983 film by James Sbardellati

- Theatrical release film poster by Boris Vallejo
- Directed by: James Sbardellati (as John Watson)
- Written by: Howard R. Cohen
- Produced by: James Sbardellati
- Starring: Rick Hill; Barbi Benton; Richard Brooker; Lana Clarkson; Bernard Erhard
- Cinematography: Leonardo Rodríguez Solís
- Edited by: John K. Adams; Silvia Ripoll
- Music by: Óscar Cardozo Ocampo
- Production companies: Millennium; Aries Cinematográfica Argentina
- Distributed by: New World Pictures
- Release date: September 2, 1983 (U.S.)
- Running time: 80 minutes
- Countries: United States; Argentina
- Language: English
- Budget: US$500,000
- Box office: $11.9 million

Deathstalker is a 1983 American-Argentine sword and sorcery film directed by James Sbardellati (as John Watson) and starring Rick Hill, Barbi Benton, Richard Brooker, Lana Clarkson and Bernard Erhard. In it, a cynical antihero known only as Deathstalker (Hill) finds himself the unwitting participant in a warriors' tournament, set up under false pretense to wipe out all potential challengers to the reign of Munkar (Erhard), the evil mage who usurps a king's throne and holds his princess daughter (Benton) captive.

It was the second and most successful in an informal cycle of medieval fantasy films produced by B-movie veteran Roger Corman during the 1980s and early 1990s. It also marked the beginning of a nine-year partnership between Corman and leading Argentine studio Aries Cinematográfica. It spawned a moderately popular franchise of sequels and remakes, although later depictions of the main character toned down his amorality in favor of more benign transgressions.

== Plot ==
In a mythical land and time, the warrior Deathstalker is set by a witch on a quest to find a chalice, an amulet and a sword, two of which are already held by the wicked sorcerer Munkar, who has deposed the land's king and taken control as the new kingdom's regent. Deathstalker finds the sword almost immediately, which has been hidden by the witch in a cave guarded by an ogre and an imp. The imp Salmaron reveals himself to be a thief cursed by the witch and aids Deathstalker in defeating the ogre. Deathstalker removes the curse from Salmaron and the thief agrees to accompany Deathstalker on his journey. Sword in hand, Deathstalker sets out to Munkar's castle to gain the remaining objects of power.

On his journey, Deathstalker learns of a tournament from Oghris, a charming warrior. Munkar has invited warriors across the land to participate in contests until a winner is determined - the winner will inherit Munkar's kingdom. One night along the way to the tournament, the pair meet Kaira, a defiant female warrior who wears only a g-string and a cloak. Later that night Deathstalker has sex with her. Salmaron looks on with amusement at the pair. Kaira joins the group on their journey the next morning.

Arriving at Munkar's castle, Deathstalker and the other participants gather in Munkar's banquet room the night before the tournament. The warriors are invited to get drunk and rape Munkar's harem slaves, including Princess Codille. Oghris connects with one slave girl while Kaira keeps Deathstalker to herself. Deathstalker rescues Princess Codille, briefly, but Munkar takes her back. Munkar reveals to his assistant that his true agenda is for the warriors to fight each other to the death until only a weakened survivor remains for Munkar to kill. This would remove all threats to his rule. Munkar transforms his assistant into the likeness of the Princess and sends him to kill the hero; when Deathstalker attempts to rape Codille, he discovers that the woman is not all "woman" and sends her away. Kaira finds the assassin; assuming she is the real Codille, she is tragically killed by the assassin in a sword fight after Munkar's disguise spell wears off.

The night after the first day of the tournament, Oghris is taken by Munkar's men to a prison cell while Salmaron is attacked by prison guards. The thief is knocked into a well that leads to Munkar's harem. It is revealed that Oghris brought Deathstalker to the tournament expressly for Munkar and he is ordered to kill him. Reluctant to kill his friend, Oghris warns Deathstalker and asks the hero to just leave the tournament but Deathstalker refuses and attacks him. During the brawl, Oghris has the chance to draw the sword and kill Deathstalker but chooses to fight fairly and ultimately loses. Deathstalker says goodbye to the fighter and kills him.

The last day of the tournament arrives and there are only two competitors left: Deathstalker and an ogre. After a long fight, Deathstalker kills the ogre and moves to claim his prize. He is attacked by Munkar's men but makes his way to the amulet. Salmaron is discovered in the harem room but frees the women and helps them slay the guards. Deathstalker defeats the holder of the amulet and faces Munkar; he is able to defeat the sorcerer's illusions and claims the third object of power. Deathstalker declares he has no interest in Munkar's power or kingdom. He destroys the three objects of power and throws Munkar to a crowd of slaves who tear him apart.

== Cast ==
- Rick Hill as Deathstalker
- Barbi Benton as Codille
- Richard Brooker as Oghris
- Lana Clarkson as Kaira
- Bernard Erhard as Munkar
- Víctor Bó as Kang
- Augusto Larreta as Salmaron
- Verónica Llinás as Toralva (as Lillian Ker)
- Marcos Woinsky as Gargit
- Adrian De Piero as Nicor
- Jorge Sorvik as King Tulak
- Boy Olmi as Young Man/Young Thief
- Horacio Marassi as Creature Leader (as Horace Marassi)
- José Arevalo as Pig Man (uncredited)
- Patrick Duggan as Colobri
- Maria Fournery as Anella

== Production ==
=== Development ===
By the early 1980s, the storied Argentine film industry was in a catastrophic situation, crippled by the country's economical collapse and a decline in independent foreign distributors, with no more than twenty films produced per year. To ensure their company's survival, Aries Cinematográfica owners Héctor Olivera and Fernando Ayala understood the need for co-productions. They met veteran filmmaker Roger Corman through Alejandro Sessa, another Aries partner, while promoting their wares at the Manila Film Festival. Looking to exploit the success of Clash of the Titans and Conan The Barbarian, Corman had already produced the fantasy film Sorceress (1982) in Mexico, although he had not been fully satisfied by the working conditions there. Argentina offered capable technicians made all the more affordable by a highly favorable dollar-to-peso exchange rate, while Aries was the only remaining company in the country to control its own studios.

Deathstalker was the first of two films that formed the initial phase of the Corman/Aries partnership, the second being Kain of Dark Planet (shot shortly after and released in 1984 as The Warrior and the Sorceress), although the agreement would eventually stretch to ten films. Deathstalker started development at New World Pictures, but Corman finalized a deal to sell the company right as production commenced. He retained his ongoing slate, which he brought with him to a new outfit called Millennium, in essence the same operation under a different name. The films were privately financed by Corman. The legal entity behind the picture was Palo Alto Productions, which he had used on and off in the past. Although they would become more involved in the creative with later films, at this stage the Argentines received ready-made scripts and instructions from the U.S. While Corman devised the titles of most of his productions, he deferred to his frequent screenwriter Howard R. Cohen when the latter suggested the name "Deathstalker."

This was the directorial debut of James Sbardellati, who had been an assistant on several Corman productions, as well as on Don Coscarelli's fantasy film The Beastmaster. Sbardellati brought with him his Beastmaster production assistant Frank K. Isaac. Coscarelli later endorsed both Deathstalker and its spiritual successor Barbarian Queen, saying: "To be honest, I thought they were a lot of fun and if The Beastmaster helped to inspire them then that's fine with me." Pre-production talks between Corman and Olivera started in October 1982, and work began in earnest with Isaac's arrival in Buenos Aires in late November. The Argentines, who were unfamiliar with high fantasy, initially pitched more Gothic set designs, so they were shown some art by Frank Frazetta and Boris Vallejo (who painted the film's poster) to inform their contributions. Set designer Emilio Basaldúa declared: "Our cinema had to live this experience in the first place, so that we could demonstrate the brilliance of our human resources, and make it possible to establish a pattern with this type of work."

The cast was led by five Americans, with Argentines filing all remaining roles. Like Sorceress, Deathstalker showcased a Playboy model, Barbi Benton. Although she was frequently referred to as a former Playmate of the Year, including on the film's domestic video sleeve, she was a covergirl for the magazine but never a Playmate. Former college football player and TV actor Rick Hill made his theatrical debut with the film. Thanks to her combination of height and beauty, Lana Clarkson became an instant favorite for Corman when she came in to audition, and her reading for the role of warrior Kaira was a formality. In addition to playing sidekick Oghris, Richard Brooker served as stunt coordinator. Several of the fighters were portrayed by professional wrestlers from the local program Titanes en el ring, including the franchise's trademark Pig Man who was played by José Luis Arévalo, best known as "Khangai the Mongol."

=== Filming ===
Principal photography started on January 10, 1983, under the working title El cazador de la muerte (lit. 'The Death Hunter'), and spread across thirty-seven days. The film was shot at and around Estudios Baires, which Olivera and Ayala co-owned with a third party in Don Torcuato, a northern suburb of Buenos Aires. The budget was quoted as US$2.5 million but, as often with Corman, it was inflated for publicity and really stood in at around $500,000. Olivera estimated that it was three times cheaper to film in Argentina than in the U.S. at the time. Thirteen crew members were dispatched from Los Angeles, while the rest were regulars of Aries' domestic productions. The U.S. cast and crew used the facilities of Hindú Club, a Don Torcuato multisports association, parts of which were refurbished as a hotel. Sbardelatti met his future wife, Argentine personal assistant Andrea Coppola, on this shoot. The presence of Hollywood hopefuls was a minor novelty for the local press, which alleged romances between Brooker and Clarkson, between Hill and Argentine editor Silvia Ripoll, and especially between Benton and supporting actor Víctor Bó, a national heart-throb.

Special effects man John Carl Buechler, who had served on four previous Corman productions including Sorceress, was brought back thanks to his work on that shoot, which was an embattled one. Buechler directed many effects heavy scenes himself. Veteran Argentine makeup artist Natan Solans worked under Buechler. A wig was used to help Rick Hill achieve the desired long-haired look. While the Argentines were appreciative of Buechler's contributions in a domain that was largely new to them, the relationship with Sbardellati was more contentious. A technician suffered injuries after falling from a platform deemed unsafe in windy conditions, which some chalked up to the director's lack of consideration for the locals. He also struggled with certain complex sequences, such as the banquet, whose filming was suspended and finished two weeks later, leading to unsanitary conditions and continuity issues. He ended up spending a total of 40,000 metre of film, an inordinate amount for such a production. There were up to four hundred extras in some scenes, as they only cost the equivalent of $3 a day. Corman, a mostly hands-off producer, only attended the beginning of the shoot, watched a few dailies, and otherwise left the crew alone. It was announced that the film had recently wrapped during the 1983 American Film Market.

=== Post-production ===
Deathstalker was fully post-produced in Argentina, although Corman sent in a young editor from the U.S. named John K. Adams to oversee the process. Disagreements with Sbardellati led to his departure at that stage, and the use of a pseudonym in the finished picture. Some crew members were also asked by Corman to change their names to American ones in the credits. As a joke, they translated them literally, with comical results like "Alex Plowing" (production manager Alejandro Arando).

== Release ==
=== Pre-release ===
The film's trailer was edited by Tony Randel. Following his sale of New World Pictures, Corman initially wanted to focus on producing and, on an experimental basis, kept using New World as his domestic theatrical distributor until February 1984 (the deal would end in litigation as Corman was dissatisfied with his former company's support). New World also represented Deathstalker for international sales during its launch window, before the rights reverted to Corman on January 1, 1984.

=== Theatrical ===
Deathstalker opened in several states including Florida on September 2, 1983. It was the third Millennium picture to see release after Screwballs and Space Raiders. It reached Los Angeles on January 6, 1984, and New York City on February 10, 1984. The film was profitable, grossing nearly $12 million domestically, which amounted to over $5 million in rentals (rentals in this context representing revenue after exhibitors' take). Although Aries, which also acted as a domestic distributor, considered a January 1985 launch in Argentina, retrospective sources indicate that it was not released in the country.

=== Home media ===
Deathstalker was one of the first three titles in a new output deal between Corman and Vestron Video. It arrived on VHS and Betamax in the second week of November 1984, on CED in the first week of March 1985, and on LaserDisc at an unspecified date. The film entered the video charts at number 22, on its way to being certified Gold by the RIAA. Billboard magazine ranked it as the 9th best renting horror-themed release of the 1984–85 season. The film was not issued on videotape in Argentina.

Corman's New Concorde brought the film to DVD on October 23, 2001. The cover of a 2011 repress by British label Film 2000 bore the unusual billing "Lana Clarkson, murder victim in the Phil Spector case". Shout Factory, which has acquired rights to much of the Concorde library, reissued the film on a limited double Blu-ray with its first sequel on August 30, 2016, and on 4K Blu-ray on August 26, 2025.

=== Television ===
Deathstalker received its U.S. TV premiere on premium cable channel Showtime on 1 May 1985. The film's syndication rights were sold to American National Enterprises for inclusion in a themed package called Warriors.

== Reception ==
=== Contemporary ===
Initial reception to Deathstalker was mostly negative. Todd McCarthy of trade magazine Variety wrote: "With bountiful action and acres of naked flesh, both male and female, film pretty accurately captures the intended heavy metal look, but limp script and threadbare production values relegate this to quick-as-possible playoff status." Michael Blowen of The Boston Globe deemed it "a cauldron brimming with stale filmmaking, stone-faced acting and primitive editing. Aside from the nasty rapes (I lost count after six) and the endless violence, Deathstalker drips with derivative dullness... The movie is so bad that the director can't even give you a credible decapitation". Ed Blank of The Pittsburgh Press called the title character "an uncaring, unsympathetic, self-absorbed goon" and the film "the Caligula of sword-and-sorcery movies. [...] That it is more sufferable than Yor, Hercules, Metalstorm and other comparable quickies similarly set in an indeterminate era says little for Deathstalker and less for the others."

Conversely, Bill Cosford of The Miami Herald wrote: "it is a pleasant surprise to be able to report the release of a hunk-against-the-barbarians film that, while not quite recommendable, nearly transcends its tatty genre." He also hailed it as "the first of the s-and-s films to give sex nearly equal time with disembowelment, a story concept we can only cheer." Kevin Thomas of the Los Angeles Times, a traditional exponent of action films, concurred. Calling it "a sword-and-sorcery epic with a difference", he found it "funny on purpose" and "as fast and action-filled as it is amusing", while praising its "brisk direction".

==== Year-end lists ====
- 2nd worst – John Lankford, Tucson Citizen

=== Retrospective ===
Retrospective reviews have been marginally more positive. TV Guide assessed: "This low-budget fantasy tried to take advantage of the public's brief love affair with sword-and-sorcery movies. The special effects were tacky, the acting ordinary, and the script almost nonexistent, but there were a passel of semi-clad beauties and a number of clanging sword battles." Brian Ordorff of Blu-ray.com deemed it "a mildly diverting presentation of burly men, monstrous evil, and enough topless women to make Mötley Crüe blush. Corman knows what he wants, and Sbardellati works to give it to him, though he can't conquer all of the effort's creative challenges". R.L. Shaffer of IGN wrote that "Deathstalker is a genuine masterpiece of B-movie awesomeness. It's surprisingly imaginative, ambitious and off-the-wall. [...] Sure, beneath the sugar-coating this film is nothing more than nutritionless junk food. But it's damn tasty, proving to be one of the coolest, most off-the-wall entertaining Conan knockoffs around."

== Legacy ==
In 1984, syndicated genre film columnist Joe Bob Briggs ranked Deathstalker at number 5 on his list of the top drive-in classics of all time. Forty years later, Briggs selected the film for a double header Tribute to Roger Corman held in presence of the filmmaker for his 70-year career anniversary. It was broadcast ahead of season six of his Shudder series The Last Drive-in. Deathstaker was chosen as Corman's signature production, while the other half of the bill (A Bucket of Blood) was meant to represent him at his directorial best. When asked about his selection, Briggs reiterated: "Deathstalker is just one of the most amazing low-budget movies ever made. They have so many stunts and effects in that movie. I don’t even think it could have been made in the United States".

== Franchise ==
=== Sequels ===
The film's commercial success led to three sequels: Deathstalker II (1987), Deathstalker and the Warriors from Hell (1988), and Deathstalker IV: Match of Titans (1992). The first one was co-produced with Aries.

=== Unrealized Buechler project ===
Encouraged by his contributions to the second unit of Deathstalker, effects man John Carl Buechler conceived Demonslayer, his own fantasy saga whose first chapter, The Golden Crown of Tanis, he hoped to turn into his directorial bow. He pitched it to Corman, but the latter had already scheduled his next three efforts in the genre, and turned it down. Buechler instead debuted with a segment of the anthology film The Dungeonmaster (1984) for Empire International.

=== Other Corman/Aries co-productions ===
Between the original and its first sequel, Corman made five more fantasy films with Aries: The Warrior and the Sorceress (1984), Wizards of the Lost Kingdom (1985), Barbarian Queen (1985), Amazons (1986) and Stormquest (1987). Barbarian Queen is a spiritual successor to Deathstalker which puts Clarkson in the lead, in a similar role to that of Kaira in the earlier film.

In addition, the Corman/Aries partnership yelded three crime films: Cocaine Wars (1985), Two to Tango (1988) and Play Murder for Me (1990).

=== Remake ===
A remake of the film was released in 2003 by New Concorde, another of Corman's labels, under the title Barbarian. Although the story remains broadly the same and Munkar (now played by Martin Kove) returns as the main antagonist, the hero portrayed by bodybuilder Mike O'Hearn has been renamed Kane and given a diminutive creature sidekick, which was poorly received.

=== Second remake ===
In March 2024, it was announced that a Deathstalker reboot was in the works from Canadian director Steven Kostanski, with veteran action star Daniel Bernhardt taking over the title role. Berserker Gang, a genre film company co-founded by musician Saul "Slash" Hudson, was a partner in the production. A crowdfunding campaign launched concurrently on Kickstarter to bring in additional financing. The film received its world premiere at the 2025 Locarno Festival in Switzerland.

== In popular culture ==
Deathstalker, the 2023 debut album of Canadian heavy metal band Tower Hill, is named after this film, with the title track quoting several lines of its dialogue.

== Comic book adaptation ==
In late 2023, Vault Comics announced an eponymous series based on the Deathstalker property, which served as a teaser for the aforementioned reboot. Producer Slash and director Kostanski are joined by Tim Seeley, Jim Terry and Kurt Michael Russell on the creative team.
