= Barbarian Queen =

1985 American-Argentine fantasy film

- Theatrical release poster by Boris Vallejo
- Directed by: Héctor Olivera
- Written by: Howard R. Cohen
- Produced by: Frank Isaac; Alejandro Sessa
- Starring: Lana Clarkson; Katt Shea; Frank Zagarino; Dawn Dunlap
- Cinematography: Rodolfo Denevi; Rudi Donovan
- Edited by: Silvia Ripoll; Leslie Rosenthal
- Music by: Christopher Young and James Horner
- Distributed by: Concorde Pictures
- Release date: April 1985
- Running time: 70 minutes
- Countries: Argentina; United States
- Languages: English; Spanish

Barbarian Queen (also known as Queen of the Naked Steel) is a 1985 American-Argentine fantasy film starring Lana Clarkson, directed by Héctor Olivera and written by Howard R. Cohen. The film premiered in April 1985 in the United States. It was executive produced by Roger Corman, and it was the third in a series of ten movies that Corman produced in Argentina during the 1980s.

== Plot ==
A peaceful barbarian village prepares to celebrate the wedding of Queen Amethea (Lana Clarkson) to Prince Argan (Frank Zagarino). During preparations for the wedding ceremony, the forces of Lord Arrakur (Arman Chapman) attack the village. After gang-raping Amethea's younger sister, Taramis (Dawn Dunlap), the attackers take Prince Argan and Taramis as prisoners, along with several others. The remaining villagers are slaughtered. Queen Amethea, her handmaiden Estrild (Katt Shea) and the female warrior Tiniara (Susana Traverso) survive the attack and set out for Arrakur's city to rescue the prisoners and seek revenge for the destruction of their village.

Along the way, the three women come across a small encampment of Arrakur's forces. Amethea and Tiniara ambush and kill the men, discovering Taramis captive inside the camp, who has seemingly been traumatized by her experience and acts withdrawn and delusional.

On the outskirts of Arrakur's realm, the women meet members of an underground resistance force who agree to help smuggle Amethea's party into the city, but refuse to take up arms with them against the tyrannical Arrakur. Inside the city gates, Amethea discovers Argan and the other men taken from her village are being forced to fight as gladiators in the arena at the center of town. Taramis sees Arrakur and leaves the other women to follow him; they try to find her, but while looking for her Estrild is attacked and raped by two of Arrakur's guards. When Arrakur is leading a procession of troops into his palace he recognises Taramis from the camp and allows her to accompany him inside. Amethea and Tiniara come to Estrlid's defence, but they are overpowered and taken prisoner.

Estrild becomes part of the gladiators' harem, where she is reunited with Argan, telling him of their failed rescue attempt. Amethea and Tiniara are interrogated separately; Tiniara dies in an escape attempt, while Amethea is sent to the dungeon to be tortured. Once there she is stripped down completely with nothing left but her thong and bound in leather straps on a torture rack.

Arrakur and Taramis, who is pretending to be a willing concubine, go to Amethea in the torture chamber. Taramis pretends to not know Amethea, while Arrakur demands information about the rebels who helped Amethea into the city. Amethea refuses to speak, and Arrakur demands answers by the morning. Meanwhile, Argan, the other gladiators, and Estrild plot an uprising against Arrakur.

Back in the Dungeon the torturer begins to rape Amethea seemingly planning to impregnate her as a scientific experiment, but she uses her vagina to squeeze him so painfully that she can compel him to release her, whereupon Amethea hurls him into a pool of acid and escapes the dungeon.

Finding Estrild, the two women flee the castle and regroup with the rebels, who agree to help in the planned overthrow of Arrakur's forces led by Argan during the gladiatorial games. Amethea and the rebels join with the gladiators in the attack. Amethea fights Arrakur in one-on-one combat during the melee, but is defeated and disarmed by him. Before Arrakur can deliver the killing blow, however, Taramis stabs him in the back, killing him. Amethea and Argan are reunited and celebrate the liberation of the city from Arrakur's tyranny.

== Cast ==
- Lana Clarkson as Amethea
- Katt Shea as Estrild
- Frank Zagarino as Argan
- Dawn Dunlap as Taramis
- Susana Traverso as Tiniara
- Víctor Bó as Strymon
- Armando Capó as Arrakur (as Arman Chapman)
- Andrea Barbieri as Zoraida (as Andrea Barbizon)
- Tony Middleton as Zohar
- Andrea Scriven as Dariac
- Eddie Pequenino as Slave Trader (as Eddie Little)
- Patrick Duggan as Shaman
- Lucy Tiller as Orellia
- Iván Grey as Karax (as Ivan Green)
- Theodore McNabney as Cerus (as Theo McNabney)
- John Head as Alfana
- Daniel Seville as Kantaka
- Roberto Catarineu as Shibdiz/Shibdiz the torturer (as Robert Carson)
- Matilde Mur as Eunuch (as Matilda Muir)
- Ricardo Jordán as Vanir (as Richard R. Jordan)
- Eva Adanaylo as Blind Woman (as Eva Donnelly)
- Enrique Fynn Sastre as Guard (as Henry Finn)
- Grace Castle as Arrakur's lover
- Luis Alday as Warrior (as Louis Alday)
- Norman Friedman as Warrior
- Alexander Essex as Warrior
- Daniel Ripari as Warrior (as Guy Reed)
- Alfredo Alesandrini as Warrior (as Alfred Alexander)
- Arturo Noal as Warrior (as Arthur Neal)
- Marcos Woinsky as Arrakur's Right Hand Man/Arrakur's Henchman (uncredited)

== Production ==
The film was one of the first from Corman's new company, Concorde.

Barbarian Queen was filmed in Don Torcuato, Argentina by director Héctor Olivera as part of a nine-picture deal between Olivera's Aires Productions and Roger Corman’s U.S.-based Concorde-New Horizons. Corman was looking to produce low-budget sword-and-sorcery films to capitalize on the success of Conan the Barbarian (1982), while Olivera sought to fund more personal film projects via the profits from his deal with Corman. Lana Clarkson, who had appeared in a supporting role as an amazonian warrior in the previous Aires-Concorde coproduction Deathstalker, was cast in the lead as Amethea. Clarkson performed all of her own stunts in the picture.

== Release ==
Barbarian Queen had a limited theatrical release on April 26, 1985. Vestron Video originally released two versions of the film on VHS: the R-rated theatrical cut, and an unrated edition that contained an extended version of the dungeon sequence. All subsequent DVD releases only contained the R-rated cut. The Shout!Factory DVD release contains the unrated material as a bonus feature.

== Reception ==
B-movie critic Joe Bob Briggs gave the film a tongue-in-cheek positive review, writing, "It's no Conan the Barbarian II, but it's got what it takes, namely: Forty-six breasts, including two on the male lead. Thirty-one dead bodies. Heads roll. Head spills. Three gang rapes. Women in chains. Orgy. Slave-girl sharing. One bird's-nest bra. The diabolical garbonza torture. Sword fu. Torch fu. Thigh fu (you have to see it to believe it)."

Roman Martel of DVD Verdict wrote that the film is enjoyable but problematic for its misogyny. R. L. Shaffer of IGN called it an unintentionally funny Conan the Barbarian ripoff.

TV Guide rated it 2/5 stars and wrote that despite the film's exploitative content, Olivera "inject[s] some style and pace to the rather silly goings-on".

Stuart Galbraith IV of DVD Talk wrote that the film "isn't all that terrible" and appeals to its target audience.

== Controversy ==
Several critics have commented upon the ambiguity of the film's seemingly feminist narrative and the exploitative nature of its many scenes of female rape, nudity, and bondage. Variety’s review of the film suggested the "Concept of female warriors besting male opponents on the battlefield is unconvincing as presented, with the gals more effective as sex objects…Emphasis on rape and torture is overdone." In The Modern Amazons: Warrior Women On-Screen, Dominique Mainon and James Ursini note the film follows a "pseudo-feminine empowerment storyline…In the course of the quest, however, Amethea is caught, stripped down to a pair of thong panties, and bound to a torture device for an unusually long portion of the movie." That the movie's centerpiece is the extended sequence of the supposedly empowered Amethea's topless, BDSM-inflected torture/interrogation has prompted readings of the film as "a delicate postfeminist balance of three discordant elements: a timid rape-and-bondage spectacle, an incoherent feminism, and a very patriarchal plot structure...a feminist narrative arc ostensibly motivates rape imagery."

Rikke Schubart suggests the culmination of the dungeon sequence – in which Amethea literally crushes the torturer's penis with her pelvic muscles – represents a genuine "feminist dislocation" of gender codes, which takes images "of the female rape-victim as weak and helpless and relocates them…as rape-victim being dangerous and lethal." However, Schubart's discussion also implies that the feminism is at least partially mitigated by the sequence's eroticized use of bondage imagery and the objectified presentation of Clarkson's nudity: "Men have no problem identifying with men as victims and women as castrators if this happens in an erotic context where it is obvious that the woman is there to be looked at."

== Sequels ==
=== Barbarian Queen II ===
A follow-up film, Barbarian Queen II: The Empress Strikes Back was billed as a sequel, but actually neither the plot nor the characters had anything to do with the original film, except for Lana Clarkson starring again in the title role, and the inclusion of a protracted sequence reminiscent of the first film, with Clarkson's character princess Athalia who is implied to be the Reincarnation of Amethea being captured, stripped, and tortured on a rack.

Principal photography took place in Mexico in 1988; however the film was not released in the U.S. until 1992, when it went straight-to-video.

=== Wizards of the Lost Kingdom II ===
Lana Clarkson reprised the role of Amethea as a supporting character in the PG-rated Wizards of the Lost Kingdom II (1989), which features recycled footage of battle scenes from Barbarian Queen. Despite this, there is no apparent connection to the plot of Barbarian Queen, and the Amethea that appears in Wizards of the Lost Kingdom 2 is arguably not the same character that Clarkson played in Barbarian Queen.

=== Proposed third film ===
In 1990 it was announced that Barbarian Queen III: Revenge of the She-King would film in Bulgaria; however the project was never completed.

== Legacy ==
Roger Corman reportedly claimed in later years that the title character was an inspiration for Xena: Warrior Princess.
