= The Warrior and the Sorceress =

1984 film by John Broderick

- Theatrical release film poster by Joann Daley
- Directed by: John C. Broderick
- Screenplay by: John C. Broderick; William Stout (originally uncredited)
- Based on: A story by John C. Broderick and William Stout; Yojimbo by Akira Kurosawa (uncredited)
- Produced by: John C. Broderick; Frank K. Isaac; Héctor Olivera; Alejandro Sessa; Roger Corman (executive producer – uncredited)
- Starring: David Carradine; Luke Askew; María Socas; Anthony De Longis; Harry Townes
- Cinematography: Leonardo Rodríguez Solís
- Edited by: Silvia Ripoll
- Music by: Louis Saunders
- Production companies: Aries Cinematográfica Argentina; New Horizon Picture Corp
- Distributed by: New World Pictures
- Release date: September 7, 1984; (US)
- Running time: 81 minutes
- Countries: Argentina; United States
- Language: English
- Budget: $600,000 - $4,000,000 (Estimated)
- Box office: $2,886,225 (US)

The Warrior and the Sorceress is a 1984 Argentine-American fantasy action film directed by John C. Broderick and starring David Carradine, María Socas and Luke Askew. It was written by Broderick (story and screenplay) and William Stout (story). It released direct-to-video.

The Warrior and the Sorceress is a sword and sorcery version of the classic Kurosawa film Yojimbo. The hero is a wandering warrior who becomes involved in a struggle between rival warlords. It is also considered by some to be a cult classic. Carradine's costume included a glove to conceal the cast on his broken right hand. He later wrote that Socas's costume was topless because the director was "obsessed" by her body.

The Warrior and the Sorceress was the second entry in a series of ten films that Roger Corman produced in Argentina during the 1980s, with the first one being Deathstalker (1983).

== Synopsis ==
The world of Ura is ravaged by its two suns, turning it into a desert. There, two rival warlords of a village, Zeg and Bal Caz, constantly fight against each other in a battle over the only wellspring in the village of Yamatar. The mercenary Kain, who was once a member of a now extinct ancient order of holy warriors known as the Homeraks, arrives at the town and announces that his skills are for hire to the highest bidder. Kain finds out that Naja, a beautiful sorceress and former priestess of the same order as Kain, has been taken captive by Zeg, who pressures Naja into forging the magical Sword of Ura, which he wants to use to rule the land. Naja, who commanded Homeraks just as Kain did when their order ruled the world, inspires him to save her and help the village people. Kain begins to complicate the situation, taking advantage of the ongoing feud to weaken the rival warlords and eventually defeat them.

== Cast ==
- David Carradine ... Kain the Warrior
- María Socas ... Naja the Sorceress
- Luke Askew ... Zeg the Tyrant
- Anthony De Longis ... Kief, Zeg's Captain (as Anthony DeLongis)
- Harry Townes ... Bludge the Prelate
- Guillermo Marín ... Bal Caz (as William Marin)
- Armando Capó ... Burgo the Slaver (as Arthur Clark)
- Daniel March ... Blather, Bal Caz's Fool
- John Overby ... Gabble, Bal Caz's Fool
- Richard Paley ... Scar-face
- Marcos Woinski ... Burgo's Captain (as Mark Welles)
- Cecilia Narova ... Exotic Dancer (as Cecilia North)
- Dylan Willias ... Zeg's Guard
- José Casanova ... Zeg's Guard (as Joe Cass)
- Miguel Zavaleta ... Zeg's Guard (as Michael Zane)
- Herman Cass ... Zeg's Guard
- Arturo Noal ... Zeg's Guard (as Arthur Neal)
- Hernán Gené ... Zeg's Guard (as Herman Gere)
- Gus Parker ... Zeg's Guard
- Ned Ivers ... Slave
- Liliana Cameroni ... Zeg's Drowned Slave (as Lillian Cameron)
- Eva Adanaylo ... Woman at Well (as Eve Adams)
- Noëlle Balfour ... (uncredited)

== Development ==
William Stout was approached by John Broderick to create some production art for a proposed film based on the Gor novels by John Norman. Stout was a fan of the sword-and-sorcery genre, and it was agreed he would write a script for Broderick based on the film Yojimbo, which Broderick greatly admired. Stout did numerous drafts of the script, which was originally called Darksword of Tor, then Kain of the Dark Planet; Stout has stated that this title change had nothing to do with capitalizing on the worldwide popularity of David Carradine's character Kwai Chang Caine, the protagonist of the 1970s adventure-western TV show Kung Fu.

Stout also said that Broderick's two choices for the lead were Gary Lockwood and David Carradine; the role was played by Carradine. The film was sold to Millennium Pictures, the new company Roger Corman formed after Corman sold New World Pictures. Millennium was subsequently renamed "New Horizons".

Stout stated that Corman gave Broderick $80,000 to make the movie and that the director originally left Stout's name off the credits, forcing Stout to contact his lawyer to have his credit reinstated.

== Production ==
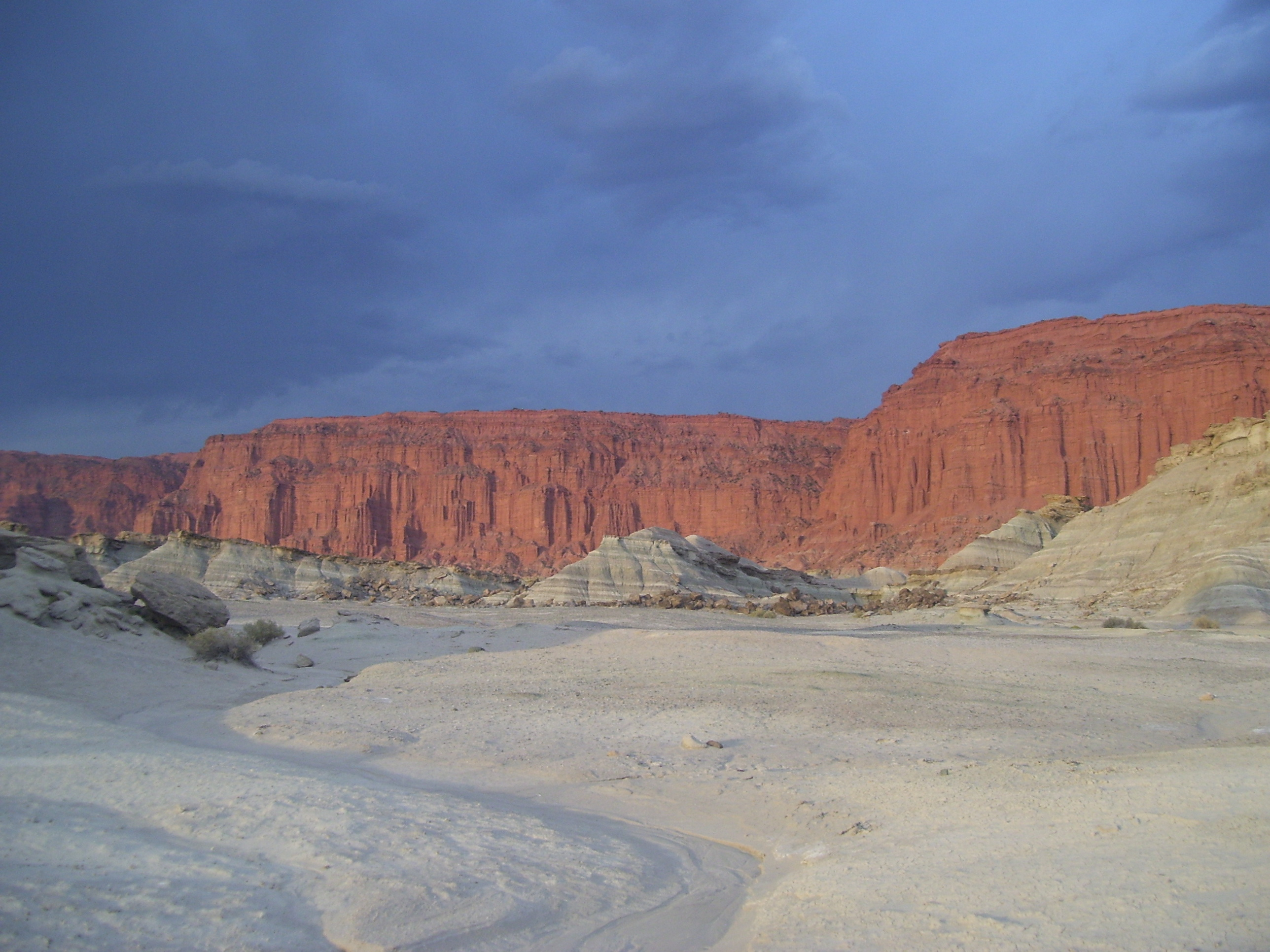
cliffs in Ischigualasto Provincial Park

The movie was shot in Argentina, where Corman had made Deathstalker. The exterior shots were filmed in Ischigualasto Provincial Park in San Juan, also known as Valle de la Luna ("Valley of the Moon") for its otherworldly appearance. Most of the film was shot inside Estudios Baires Film S.A. and Campo de Mayo, in Buenos Aires Province.

During an argument with his girlfriend before production started, David Carradine punched a wall and fractured his right hand. As a result, Carradine, who was right-handed, was trained by Anthony De Longis (who was the action and stunts coordinator, and also played the villain Kief) to learn swordfighting with his left hand. To conceal the cast on his hand, Carradine used a pointed black glove on his right arm while filming. In Carradine's memoirs, the actor states he broke his hand three days into filming, but he doesn't say how.

The outfit that Carradine uses for his character of Kain is the same he later wore for the 1991 B movie/post-apocalyptic action film Dune Warriors. In a rather obvious coincidence, Luke Askew again played the antagonist/villain role in the latter film.

Carradine says the director "was obsessed by the body of the actress who played the priestess [María Socas], so he costumed her in a topless outfit. Everywhere you looked, there was this bare-breasted woman."

Carradine liked the movie because of its swordplay and the fighting style he helped design, but says "don't expect a great movie" because the director quit during editing after a fight with Corman (which erupted because he had gone two weeks over schedule), meaning the editing was finished by two teams in two different countries. "It's a little uneven", said Carradine of the film.

In addition to Death Stalker and The Warrior and the Sorceress, Corman co-produced many other sword and sorcery movies in Argentina: Deathstalker II, Barbarian Queen, Wizards of the Lost Kingdom, Stormquest, and Amazons. All were direct-to-video.

== Similarities with Yojimbo ==
According to William Stout, John Broderick asked him to write a sword and sorcery screenplay based on Akira Kurosawa's 1961 Samurai film Yojimbo, which he did, then rewrote to distance the story from that original. After a number of rewrites, Broderick took the script and shopped it around. Several years later, Stout was surprised to hear that Broderick was making a film based on that script, but without Stout's name on it or any payment to Stout. Calling up the executive producer, Roger Corman, Stout managed to remedy that situation. However, upon watching the finished product, Stout was further surprised to see that Broderick had reverted much of the script to more closely follow its inspiration.

According to David Carradine's book Spirit of Shaolin, it was clear before production started that the film was going to be a version of Yojimbo. In his autobiography, Carradine recalls calling Corman to express his concerns about the similarity to Yojimbo:

I called up Roger and told him I loved the script; but what about the Yojimbo factor. Roger said, "Yes, it is rather like Yojimbo." I said, "It's not like Yojimbo. It is Yojimbo." Roger said, "Let me tell you a story. When Fistful of Dollars opened in Tokyo, Kurosawa's friends called him up and said 'You must see this picture.' Kurosawa said, 'Yes, I understand it is rather like Yojimbo.' 'No, it's not like Yojimbo, it is Yojimbo. You have to sue these people.' 'I can't sue them', he responded. 'Why not?' 'Because' -Kurosawa confessed-, 'Yojimbo is Dashiell Hammett's Red Harvest.'" I went for it.

The story however appears to be apocryphal, as Kurosawa and Toho Studios did in fact successfully sue Sergio Leone.

== Reception ==
The Philadelphia Inquirer called it "an unashamedly sordid rehashing - and retrashing - of Akira Kurosawa's samurai classic Yojimbo, via Sergio Leone's A Fistful of Dollars, with a little Star Wars and Conan the Barbarian tossed in for good measure."

The Los Angeles Times also noted the similarities to Yojimbo and said the film had "awkward action, a general air of determined viciousness and (Carradine excepted) so much overacting that it sometimes seems that a new dramatic style is being forged."

Stout recalled when he saw the film, "John Broderick had changed all of the dialogue I had sweated over — and the plot as well. It turned out that John was really crazy about Yojimbo, so much so that John took what I had written and changed it all back to mirror every single plot point in Yojimbo. When I saw the movie, I was mortified. It was total, unabashed plagiarism — and it had my name was on it! I was pleased and thrilled, though, that David Carradine, my first choice for the lead, was cast as Kain. I knew he'd be great."

Footage of The Warrior and the Sorceress was later used by Corman for Wizards of the Lost Kingdom II (1989).

== Bibliography ==
- Carradine, David (1995). Endless Highway. Journey Editions. ISBN 9781885203205.
- Fevrier, Andrés (2020, Argentina). Hollywood in Don Torcuato. The Adventures of Roger Corman and Hector Olivera. "Hollywood en Don Torcuato. Las aventuras de Roger Corman y Héctor Olivera". This work is licensed under the Creative Commons Attribution-NonCommercial-ShareAlike license. 4.0 International (CC BY-NC-SA 4.0 — https://creativecommons.org/licenses/by-nc-sa/4.0/deed.es)
