= Reggie (Phantasm) =

- Phantasm character
- First appearance: Phantasm
- Last appearance: Phantasm: Ravager
- Created by: Don Coscarelli
- Portrayed by: Reggie Bannister

In-universe information
- Gender: Male
- Occupation: Ice cream vendor
- Status: Deceased

Reggie is a fictional character from the Phantasm franchise of horror films. In all of his appearances, Reggie has been portrayed by Reggie Bannister.

== Concept and creation ==
Writer/director Don Coscarelli wrote the character of Reggie for Reggie Bannister and based it on their friendship. They then pushed the character into new directions, divergent from Bannister's personality. Bannister describes the character as an everyman. According to Coscarelli, everyman characters like Reggie are important, because they ground the film and allow humor to unfold. Bannister further described the character as written to be extremely loyal; Bannister says that Coscarelli "wrote this character to be every guy's guy, every man's friend, the guy that would throw himself on the flames to the door of hell to save a friend." The character was named after Bannister himself, as Coscarelli liked to draw characters from his own experiences. Instead of struggling to find a unique name, Coscarelli named him after the inspiration. Bannister had much input into the character's portrayal, and Coscarelli frequently sought his opinion. Bannister was influenced by the comedy of Harold Lloyd and Charlie Chaplin; he states that Reggie is "a humorless character" who, like the characters of Lloyd and Chaplin, does not recognize the humor of his situations. Nate Yapp describes the character as rising in prominence from a third lead to main protagonist. Bannister states that the character starts as a simple ice cream vendor and progresses into an action hero, and his rise to series protagonist turns him into the Tall Man's nemesis. While working as a musician, Bannister was drafted during the Vietnam War, and he used this experience to guide his characterization of an ice cream vendor forced to confront evil.

== Characteristics ==
Marc Savlov describes the character as "a shotgun and guitar-wielding mensch with a receding hairline and a turbo-charged libido". Brad Miska of Bloody Disgusting describes Reggie as "always horny" and identifies a traditional "Reggie Girl", a beautiful woman sent by The Tall Man to tempt Reggie.

== Appearances ==
In Phantasm (1979), Reggie is a friend of Jody Pearson (Bill Thornbury), whose younger brother Mike (A. Michael Baldwin) tries to convince them that a mortician called the Tall Man is responsible for a series of local deaths. Mike, Jody, and Reggie investigate the Tall Man and discover that he is reanimating the dead to use as slaves in another dimension. In a final confrontation, Jody and Mike defeat the Tall Man, and Reggie is seemingly killed. However, Mike wakes up with a start, and Reggie tells him that he was having a nightmare. Reggie explains that he has been taking care of Mike since the death of his older brother from a car crash, and nightmares have been a common occurrence. Confused, Mike goes upstairs and is attacked by the Tall Man, who captures him.

In Phantasm II (1988), Reggie saves Mike (James LeGros) from the Tall Man, but Mike is institutionalized for six years. Convinced that the events of the first film were not just a dream, Mike fakes his recovery and tries to recruit Reggie to help him track down the Tall Man and help Liz Reynolds (Paula Irvine), a girl with whom Mike shares a telepathic link. Reggie at first resists and denies the existence of the Tall Man, but, when his family is killed by the Tall Man, Reggie vows revenge and joins Mike. After Liz is kidnapped by the Tall Man, Reggie and Mike break into the crematorium where she is held and pump the Tall Man full of acid-laced embalming fluid, which causes him to melt. However, the Tall Man reappears, captures Mike and Liz, and leaves Reggie for dead.

In Phantasm III: Lord of the Dead (1994), Reggie saves Mike (A. Michael Baldwin) by threatening to blow up everyone with a grenade; the Tall Man, who desires Mike alive, retreats with the body of Liz, who has died. After Mike recovers in a hospital, the Tall Man kidnaps him. As he pursues the Tall Man, Reggie is joined by Tim (Kevin Connors), an orphan who has survived the Tall Man's destruction of his town, and Rocky (Gloria Lynne Henry), a tough soldier. In a dream, Reggie saves Mike with the help of Jody, who has been transformed into a sphere. They follow the Tall Man to another mausoleum, where Reggie remembers that the Tall Man can not stand cold, and they use liquid nitrogen to freeze him. However, Mike realizes he's got a sphere in his head, and Reggie is attacked by dozens of spheres. A new Tall Man appears and watches as Tim is captured and killed.

In Phantasm IV: Oblivion (1998), Reggie is released by the Tall Man "to play one last game". Jody convinces Reggie to find Mike. Reggie is first attacked by a demonic policeman and then by Jennifer, a woman whom he rescues. In the desert, Mike learns more about the Tall Man's background and attempts to force a final confrontation. When Reggie and Mike reunite, Mike tells Reggie not to trust Jody. After unsuccessfully trying to prevent the creation of the Tall Man, Mike is captured by the Tall Man and Jody. Reggie and Mike fight off the Tall Man and lure him to a trap, where he is destroyed in an explosion. However, another Tall Man walks out of a dimensional portal and removes a golden sphere from Mike's head. Reggie chases after the Tall Man, and Mike apparently dies.

In Phantasm: Ravager (2016), Reggie emerges from the desert, dehydrated and with nothing except his shotgun. Fortunately, the thief who stole his Barracuda picks him up, enabling Reggie to get it back. He picks up the thief's friend Dawn, who takes him to stay at her farmhouse, where Reggie tries to write her a song. In another reality, Reggie is in a nursing home and Mike reveals that he's suffering from dementia, and that the Tall Man never existed. Eventually, both versions of Reggie travel through a Dimensional Fork, and he finds himself in a white space inhabited by the Tall Man, who offers him his wife and daughter back in exchange for ending the hunt. Reggie refuses multiple times, and finds himself in a post-apocalyptic future where Mike reveals that he's been manipulated by the Tall Man for the past decade. In the nursing home reality, Mike tells him that he had the same dream as Reggie, and that the two should escape. Outside the nursing home, Reggie sees a vision of the post-apocalypse Mike throwing him the shotgun, and turns around to kill the doctors-turned-Gravers. He and Mike then escape in a Barracuda driven by Jody. In the nursing home reality, Reggie passes away, with Mike and Jody attending.

== Reception ==
Twitch Film says, "Reggie Bannister remains one of the most unlikely action heroes ever committed to celluloid, but the man sells it like crazy." Fearnet chose the character as one of their favorite sidekicks. Nate Yapp of Classic-Horror.com calls him "the most badass dude ever to drive an ice cream truck." William J. Wright of Film Threat calls him "one of horror's most interesting and truly human heroes". In a positive review of Phantasm II, Amy Alexander of the Philadelphia Daily News states that Bannister brings both authority and a sidelong look of helplessness.
