= Phantasm (film series) =

American horror film series

- Created by: Don Coscarelli
- Original work: Phantasm (1979)
- Owner: Coscarelli Productions
- Years: 1979–2016

Films and television
- Film(s): List of films

Phantasm is an American horror film series consisting of five films, as well as novels, comic books and merchandise. The first film, titled Phantasm, was released in 1979, received generally positive reviews and has garnered a cult following. It is mainly about the Tall Man (played by Angus Scrimm), a supernatural and malevolent undertaker and the main antagonist who turns the dead into dwarf zombies to do his bidding and take over the world. He is opposed by a young boy, Mike Pearson (A. Michael Baldwin), who tries to convince his older brother Jody (Bill Thornbury) and family friend Reggie (Reggie Bannister) of the threat.

== Films ==
Film	U.S. release date	Director(s)	Screenwriter(s)	Producer(s)	Runtime	Distributor
Phantasm	March 28, 1979	Don Coscarelli	Don Coscarelli	Don Coscarelli	89 minutes	AVCO Embassy Pictures
Phantasm II	July 8, 1988	Don Coscarelli	Don Coscarelli	Roberto A. Quezada	97 minutes	Universal Pictures
Phantasm III: Lord of the Dead	May 6, 1994	Don Coscarelli	Don Coscarelli	Don Coscarelli	91 minutes	Starway International Inc.
Phantasm IV: Oblivion	October 13, 1998	Don Coscarelli	Don Coscarelli	A. Michael Baldwin	90 minutes	Orion Home Video
Phantasm: Ravager	October 7, 2016	David Hartman	Don Coscarelli; David Hartman	Don Coscarelli	85 minutes	Well Go USA Entertainment

=== Phantasm (1979) ===
The residents of a small town have begun dying under strange circumstances, leading young Mike Pearson to investigate. After discovering that the town's mortician, only known as the Tall Man, is killing and reanimating the dead as misshapen zombies, Mike seeks help from his older brother, Jody, and their friend Reggie, a local ice cream man. Working together, they try to lure out and destroy the Tall Man, all the while avoiding his minions and a deadly silver sphere.

=== Phantasm II (1988) ===
In Phantasm II, picking up exactly where the previous film leaves off, the Tall Man and his minions attempt to take Mike, but Reggie manages to save him by blowing up the house. Eight years later, Mike, now a mental patient, still has nightmares about the evil mortician, and is the only person to recall that dreadful night. Upon being released from the institution Mike, who's had a premonition about Reggie's family, tries to warn his friend of the ensuing danger before an explosion murders the entire family. Convinced by Mike's futile warning, the two men set out to track the mysterious mortician down and rescue Liz Reynolds, a young woman, who has a psychic connection to both Mike and the Tall Man.

=== Phantasm III: Lord of the Dead (1994) ===
In Lord of the Dead, once more picking up exactly where the previous film leaves off, the Tall Man has infiltrated the minds of Mike and Reggie. The two friends embark on a journey to find and kill him, only to discover that he has destroyed town after town, leaving zombies in place of the living. Along the way, Mike and Reggie meet several characters who share their goal, including a murderous boy named Tim, and Rocky and Tanesha, two young women who are excellent fighters.

=== Phantasm IV: Oblivion (1998) ===
Taking off immediately where the last one ended, in this episode, Mike travels across dimensions and time fleeing from the Tall Man, at the same time he tries to find the origins of his enemy, and what happened the night that Jody died. Meanwhile, Reggie (accompanied by Jennifer, a beauty he picked up on the road) battles the spheres and the undead in a quest to find Mike before the Tall Man can complete his transformation.

=== Phantasm: Ravager (2016) ===
In the series finale, Reggie continues in his quest to stop the evil, dimension-hopping schemes of The Tall Man and his armada of killer Sentinel Spheres. This time, the fight becomes a multi-dimensional battle across an alien planet, multiple timelines, and altered realities, where the fate of Earth is on the line.

== Cast and crew ==
=== Cast ===
Characters	Films				
Characters	Phantasm	Phantasm II	Phantasm III: Lord of the Dead	Phantasm IV: Oblivion	Phantasm: Ravager
Characters	1979	1988	1994	1998	2016
The Tall Man Jebediah Morningside	Angus Scrimm	Angus Scrimm	Angus Scrimm	Angus Scrimm	Angus Scrimm
Reggie	Reggie Bannister	Reggie Bannister	Reggie Bannister	Reggie Bannister	Reggie Bannister
Mike Pearson	A. Michael Baldwin	James LeGros	A. Michael Baldwin	A. Michael Baldwin	A. Michael Baldwin
Jody Pearson	Bill Thornbury		Bill Thornbury	Bill Thornbury	Bill Thornbury
Lady in Lavender	Kathy Lester				Kathy Lester
Rocky			Gloria Lynne Henry		Gloria Lynne Henry

=== Characters ===
- Mike Pearson (played by A. Michael Baldwin in the first, third, fourth and fifth films, and by James Le Gros in the second) is the main protagonist of the series. He is an ordinary boy, who notices suspicious activities in the Morningside funeral home where the Tall Man operates. After he discovers the truth, the Tall Man pursues him relentlessly. In the later films, the Tall Man tries to convert Mike into one of his own kind.
- Jody Pearson (played by Bill Thornbury in all the films except the second) is Mike's older brother and guardian. Mike is very attached to his only remaining family member and afraid that he'll leave, a fear that becomes reality when the Tall Man murders Jody. In Phantasm III, Jody reappears as one of the Tall Man's Sentinels gone rogue. He helps Mike and the others on a number of occasions, but is enigmatic about what really happened to him.
- Reggie (played by Reggie Bannister) is the Pearsons' best friend, and joins Mike's quest to kill the Tall Man after his wife and daughter are killed in a rigged explosion. He is an ice cream man by trade, and is rarely seen without his trusty quadruple-barrelled shotgun, which he uses to mow down any of his enemies. A running gag in the series involves Reggie's hopeless attempts at having sex with a beautiful woman.
- The Tall Man (played by Angus Scrimm) is an alien undertaker, who is building an army of the living dead by sending corpses to his home planet for conversion. The Tall Man was once a 19th-century human named Jebediah Morningside, who invented a dimensional portal that sent him to unknown places before bringing him back to Earth as the monster he is now. His true objective remains a mystery, but it involves the conquest and occupation of Earth.
- The Lady In Lavender (played by Kathy Lester in the first and fifth films) is the Tall Man's feminine alter ego, used to seduce hapless males before killing them.
- Rocky (played by Gloria Lynne Henry in the third and fifth films) is a nunchuck-wielding martial artist who helps Reggie save Mike after her best friend Tanesha is killed in front of her eyes. She has a love-hate relationship with Reggie due to his obvious attraction towards her. Later in Phantasm V, she is seen as a member of the resistance fighting for Earth.

== Production ==
=== Development ===
The story idea for the original Phantasm film came to Don Coscarelli in a dream; one night, in his late teens, he dreamed of fleeing down endlessly long marble corridors, pursued by a chrome sphere intent on penetrating his skull with a wicked needle. There was also a quite futuristic "sphere dispenser" out of which the orbs would emerge and begin chasing him.

Originally writer-director Don Coscarelli considered the first film's ending to be conclusive and did not feel knowledgeable about writing a sequel, but Coscarelli had what he described as a breakthrough when he realized that he could start the film immediately after the previous film's final scene. He also added a road movie element in how Reggie and Mike combat the Tall Man, after which he described the process as straightforward. Coscarelli has later revealed that some elements of this movie were influenced by Stephen King, especially a few aspects of his novel 'Salem's Lot. For instance, the end of the novel, when the characters Ben Mears and Mark Petrie go out on the road chasing down vampires, gave him the "road movie" idea of Mike and Reggie chasing The Tall Man.

Universal Studios, who took an interest in the series because they wanted a horror series, allocated three million dollars for Phantasm II's budget; this was the lowest budget of any of their films in the 1980s, but it was the highest budget of any Phantasm film. Greg Nicotero and Robert Kurtzman, later of KNB EFX, were recruited for special effects. The studio exerted much control over the film, and they did not allow Coscarelli to include any dream sequences or ambiguity. The executives also wanted to recast both A. Michael Baldwin and Reggie Bannister because they were unknown and had been out of the movie business since the release of the first movie. Don Coscarelli resisted their efforts and was forced to audition A. Michael Baldwin and Reggie Bannister for the opportunity to reprise their roles. In the end, his efforts won him a concession: he was allowed to keep one of the two, but had to replace the other; Coscarelli chose to keep Bannister and cast James Le Gros in Baldwin's place. After the mild box-office results of Phantasm II (1988), Universal Studios chose not to personally pursue a sequel but did offer to distribute it should Don Coscarelli and associates make it themselves.

With no casting restrictions this time, Coscarelli offered the role of Mike to his original performer, A. Michael Baldwin, who returned to the role after almost 16 years in Phantasm III: Lord of the Dead (1994). Roger Avary, a self-confessed hardcore fan of the Phantasm series, wrote an epic screenplay originally called Phantasm 1999 A.D. as a follow-up to Phantasm III: Lord of the Dead. It was set in a post-apocalyptic near future, featuring Bruce Campbell as a co-star. As the time passed and they couldn't get the budget needed (around $10 million) Don Coscarelli wrote and directed a fourth installment titled Phantasm IV: Oblivion as a precursor to the project, that was conveniently re-titled Phantasm 2012 A.D. before renaming the planned film as Phantasm's End. Ultimately, when the financing for such an ambitious sequel couldn't be secured, the idea was scrapped altogether.

In 2004, six years after the release of Phantasm IV: Oblivion, series director Don Coscarelli told Fangoria, "I'd also still like to do another Phantasm film. Reggie Bannister and Angus Scrimm are still in great shape and raring to go."

In March 2005, Coscarelli was in the final stages of talks with New Line Cinema to produce a new entry. Reportedly, the new film was "being developed as a relaunch and as a possible trilogy about Mike's coming of age." This version never came to fruition.

Rumors about a sequel were reignited in June 2007 by footage contained in Don Coscarelli's Farewell to the Alamo Drafthouse, featuring Angus Scrimm and A. Michael Baldwin in their roles. In an interview, Reggie Bannister stated there was no activity or development of a fifth film but that anything was possible in the future.

In June 2012, rumors again surfaced that Coscarelli would begin a new Phantasm sequel. According to a report on Dread Central, the script was completed and filming would begin later in the year. Coscarelli disputed this claim, publicly stating, "I have no solid news to report on a new project now." The director, however, was being coy with film news sites. According to what Coscarelli and new co-writer-director David Hartman told Entertainment Weekly, the film Phantasm: Ravager was shot secretly in and around Southern California during 2012 and 2013.

On March 26, 2014, news of Ravager's completion was released via various film news sites. The next day, a trailer debuted on the film's official site. In a 2014 "sneak peek" video preview on the official Phantasm website, director Hartman mentioned in quick passing, "This thing is going to be in the can 2015... for sure." By October 2015, Ravager was completed and it was released the following year.

== Reception ==
=== Box office performance ===
When comparing Phantasm films to other major horror franchises such as Halloween, A Nightmare on Elm Street, Child's Play, Hellraiser, Scream, Friday the 13th, The Texas Chainsaw Massacre, and Saw, it is one of the lowest grossing horror films but has gained a cult following.

Film	Release date (US)	Budget	Box office revenue			Reference
Film	Release date (US)	Budget	United States	Foreign	Worldwide	Reference
Phantasm	March 28, 1979	$300,000	$11,988,469	—N/a	$11,988,469	
Phantasm II	July 8, 1988	$3,000,000	$7,282,851	—N/a	$7,282,851	
Phantasm III: Lord of the Dead	May 6, 1994	$2,500,000	—N/a	$358,253	$358,253	
Phantasm IV: Oblivion	October 13, 1998	$650,000	—N/a	—N/a	—N/a	
Phantasm: Ravager	October 7, 2016	–	–	–	–	
Total		$6,450,000	$19,271,320	—N/a	$19,629,573	

== In popular culture ==
A phantasm similar in design to the Tall Man is featured as the main antagonist of the 2017 Mike Tyson Mysteries episode "Mystery on Wall Street", voiced by Jeff Bergman.
