= Phantasm II =

1988 film by Don Coscarelli

- Theatrical release poster
- Directed by: Don Coscarelli
- Written by: Don Coscarelli
- Produced by: Roberto A. Quezada
- Starring: James LeGros; Reggie Bannister; Angus Scrimm; Paula Irvine; Samantha Phillips
- Cinematography: Daryn Okada
- Edited by: Peter Teschner
- Music by: Fred Myrow; Christopher L. Stone
- Distributed by: Universal Pictures
- Release date: July 8, 1988
- Running time: 97 minutes
- Country: United States
- Language: English
- Budget: $3 million
- Box office: $7.3 million

Phantasm II is a 1988 American science fantasy horror film written and directed by Don Coscarelli and stars Angus Scrimm, James LeGros, and Reggie Bannister. It is a sequel to Phantasm (1979) and the second installment in the Phantasm franchise. The plot follows the first film's protagonist, Mike Pearson, who is recently released from a mental institution, recruits his friend Reggie and some new friends in an effort to defeat the Tall Man.

The film caused controversy among fans by recasting main character Mike with LeGros, and was not well received by critics. It was followed by two direct-to-video sequels: Phantasm III: Lord of the Dead (1994) and Phantasm IV: Oblivion (1998) as well as the final film in the Phantasm franchise: Phantasm: Ravager (2016), which received a theatrical release. Following distribution problems in the U.S., Phantasm II was released in Region 1 on DVD in 2009 and Blu-ray disc in 2013.

== Plot ==
Liz Reynolds is a young woman whose psychic bond to Mike Pearson and the Tall Man manifests in the form of prophetic nightmares. Through this link, Liz pleads for Mike to find her, fearing that when her grandfather Alex Murphy dies, the Tall Man will take him. In continuation of where the first film ended, the Tall Man and his minions attempt to kidnap Mike, however Reggie manages to save him by blowing up the house.

Six years later in 1986, the now 19-year old Mike has been institutionalized and fakes recovery to get released. That night, he visits Morningside Cemetery and exhumes the graves. Reggie shows up, trying to convince him that his experiences with the Tall Man were not real. However, Mike reveals the coffins are all empty and asks Reggie to help hunt down the Tall Man. Reaching Reggie's house Mike has a premonition where the Tall Man sets off an explosion that kills Reggie's family, seconds before it occurs. After the funeral, a convinced Reggie agrees to accompany Mike. Gathering supplies and weapons they hit the road, discovering abandoned towns, pillaged graveyards left in the Tall Man's wake and even a few of his traps; including the apparition of a nude woman. A gruesome encounter with a creature resembling Liz leads them to the town of Périgord, Oregon.

Liz's grandfather Alex dies and her sister Jeri disappears during the funeral. Searching for Jeri, Liz escapes an encounter with the Tall Man and flees. The presiding priest, Father Meyers, maddened with fear, kills the reanimation of Alex using a knife, but the corpse rises and kidnaps Liz's grandmother. The following day Liz finds a funeral pin in her grandmother's empty bed and the Tall Man psychically tells Liz to return at night if she wants to rescue her grandmother. Meanwhile, Reggie picks up a hitchhiker named Alchemy who eerily resembles the nude apparition. They find Périgord deserted and dilapidated. Liz arrives at the mortuary where she encounters Father Meyers who attempts to convince her to escape with him. Meyers is killed by one of the Tall Man's spheres, and Liz encounters the Tall Man himself; who converted her grandmother into one of his Lurkers. Liz manages to escape and finally meets Mike in the cemetery.

That night the Tall Man abducts Liz in his hearse, before Mike and Reggie give chase. Liz is taken to the furnace room in the crematorium by the Tall Man's mortician assistants but she escapes, sending one of the assistants into the furnace. Mike and Reggie break into the mortuary and find the embalming room. While Reggie pours acid into the embalming fluid, Mike discovers a dimensional portal that requires a sphere to open. The pair split up to search the area, Reggie searches the basement where he fights a Graver and several Lurkers with a chainsaw and a shotgun; Reggie castrates the Graver to death and guns down the Lurkers. Mike saves Liz from a silver sphere which subdues the other mortician. A larger gold sphere emerges and begins to chase Mike and Liz. The surviving mortician manages to escape by cutting off his own hand.

Dodging the gold sphere's advanced arsenal, including scanners, lasers, and spinning blades, Mike and Liz barricade themselves in the parlor. The surviving mortician assistant returns and almost kills Liz before the gold sphere blasts through the door and kills him with a buzz saw. Liz, Mike, and Reggie reunite and use the still embedded silver sphere to access the portal. Before they can destroy the building they face the Tall Man, and pump him full of the acid-contaminated embalming fluid, which causes him to melt.

The trio escape the building after setting it on fire. They are greeted by Alchemy who has procured an abandoned hearse. As they ride off, Alchemy reveals herself to not be human, and the hearse swerves wildly then stops, ejecting Reggie. Mike and Liz, trapped in the hearse, try to convince themselves that they are dreaming but the slot to the driver's cabin opens, revealing the Tall Man. Hands break the rear window and pull Mike and Liz through.

== Cast ==
- Angus Scrimm as The Tall Man
- James LeGros as Mike Pearson
- Reggie Bannister as Reggie
- Paula Irvine as Liz Reynolds
- Samantha Phillips as Alchemy
- Kenneth Tigar as Father Meyers
- Rubin Kushner as Grandpa Alex Murphy
- Ruth C. Engel as Grandma Murphy
- Stacey Travis as Jeri Reynolds
- A. Michael Baldwin as Young Mike
- J. Patrick McNamara as Psychologist
- Mark Anthony Major as Mortician

== Themes ==
John Kenneth Muir states that, like many horror films of the 1980s, Phantasm II shifted its focus to guns. Sequels in the 1980s were required to be bigger, gorier and have more firepower than previous installments. The theme of "bigger is better" means that everything is upgraded: a quadruple shotgun, golden spheres with increased weaponry, a chainsaw duel and the nature of the Tall Man (Angus Scrimm)'s death. Muir states that the narrative of a boy dealing with the loss of his family is unchanged, but it is approached differently: instead of the surrealism of Phantasm, it is approached in a conventional, less abstract manner.

== Production ==
Writer-director Don Coscarelli says that he had been under pressure to film a sequel to Phantasm, but could not come up with a story. Coscarelli considered the first film's ending to be conclusive, and did not feel knowledgeable about writing sequels, but he had what he described as a breakthrough when he realized he could start the film immediately after the previous film's final scene. He also added a road movie element in how Reggie (Reggie Bannister) and Mike Pearson (James LeGros) combat the Tall Man, after which he described the process as straightforward. Universal Studios, who took an interest in the film because they wanted a horror series, allocated three million dollars; this was the lowest budget of any of their films in the 1980s, but it was the highest budget of any Phantasm film. Greg Nicotero and Robert Kurtzman, later of KNB EFX, were recruited for special effects. The studio exerted much control over the film, and they did not allow Coscarelli to include any dream sequences or ambiguity.

This is the only installment in the Phantasm series that does not include the entire original main cast (Bill Thornbury and his character Jody Pearson did not appear in this film), and the only one to re-cast a main character with another actor. Universal forced Coscarelli to recast the character of Mike, as they wanted a working actor. In an interview, Bannister said that LeGros' casting was initially controversial among hardcore fans, but has become more accepted. Brad Pitt auditioned for the role of Mike Pearson.

The film is also the only installment in the Phantasm series to have any involvement with a major motion picture studio.

== Release ==
Phantasm II was released theatrically on July 8, 1988, and played on 1,227 screens.

=== Home media ===
The film was released on VHS on MCA Home Video later that same year.

A Region 1 DVD was released by Universal on September 15, 2009. Shout! Factory released a new collector's edition DVD and Blu-ray release under their sub-label Scream Factory on March 26, 2013. Both the DVD and Blu-ray contain audio commentary with Don Coscarelli, Angus Scrimm and Reggie Bannister, new interviews, deleted scenes, and more. The film was played at the Phantasm-ania festival in February 2013.

== Reception ==
=== Box office ===
Phantasm II earned $3,012,285 during its opening weekend in the United States. It went on to gross a total of $7,282,851 domestically. It was later characterized by Pat H. Broeske of the Los Angeles Times as a box-office bomb.

=== Critical response ===
==== Contemporary ====
In a negative review, Roger Ebert rated the film one out of four stars, and likened it to an extended dream without logic or a coherent plot, full of nightmarish images and no character development. Time Out also said that "the only valid reason for seeing this belated sequel is that it goes some way towards explaining the incomprehensible plot of its predecessor." Variety called the film "an utterly unredeeming, full-gore sequel" and "incredibly morbid and meaningless". Carrie Rickey of The Philadelphia Inquirer described the film as "a series of apparently unrelated horrors visited upon good-looking blond people" and criticized the gore. Roger Hurlburt of the Sun-Sentinel criticized LeGros' acting and called the film a waste of time. Patrick Taggart of the Austin American-Statesman called the film "an incredibly muddled assemblage of impossibilities," and criticized its explicit violence and focus on special effects.

Writing in The New York Times, Caryn James stated that "there are some grotesquely stylish and scary moments" but they "seem to take as long to arrive as the sequel did." Kevin Thomas of the Los Angeles Times called the film "a fast, entertaining fright show" but needlessly literal and gratuitous, as the film series transforms from a surreal thriller to a trite horror film. The Oregonian critic Ted Mahar felt the film was slightly more cogent than the first film, but remained critical, writing: "Individual scenes are [okay] for bogus suspense and special effects. The acting is as good as it has to be. But on the whole, the film feels like a 90-minute version of something that was many hours longer."

In a positive review, Dave Kehr of the Chicago Tribune stated that "Coscarelli has captured the texture of a disjointed, half-remembered nightmare" and likens it to the 1920s surrealist film movement. The Philadelphia Daily News' Amy Alexander said the film "has all the elements of a classic serial horror film" and praised the special effects.

=== Retrospective ===
Scott Weinberg of Fearnet called the Phantasm sequels indecipherable and too weird to understand, though he recommends Phantasm II to fans of the original. Scott Tobias of The A.V. Club rated the film a B and wrote of the cult appeal. Matt Serafini of Dread Central rated the film four out of five, but criticized the more realistic approach taken in favor of the surrealism of the first film. Bloody Disgusting rated the film three-and-a-half out of five, but said that the film seems dated now and does not quite live up to its nostalgic value. Andy Klein of the Glendale News-Press cited the film's weirdness and creepiness as making up for breaking the rules of what makes a good horror film. Marco Lanzagorta of PopMatters rated it ten out of ten stars, and wrote: "The narrative of Phantasm II may sound absurd and ridiculous, but the feelings of dread and anxiety that we get while we watch it are very real." UGO included Phantasm II in its list of Surprisingly Decent Horror Sequels and called it a "sturdy continuation".

On the review aggregator website Rotten Tomatoes, 31% of 16 critics' reviews are positive. Metacritic, which uses a weighted average, assigned the film a score of 42 out of 100, based on 9 critics, indicating "mixed or average" reviews.

== Sequel ==
A sequel titled Phantasm III: Lord of the Dead, was released in 1994.

== Sources ==
- Hennessey, Cristopher; McCarty, Michael (2023). "The Phantasm Man". More Giants of the Genre. Wildside Press. ISBN 978-7-770-04706-0.
- Muir, John Kenneth (2011). Horror Films of the 1980s. Vol. 1. Jefferson, North Carolina: McFarland. ISBN 978-0-786-45501-0. OCLC 830347241.
