= 1995 Fangoria Chainsaw Awards =

Annual US horror film awards ceremony

4th Fangoria Chainsaw Awards
- Date: Saturday, May 6, 1995
- Site: LAX Sheraton, Los Angeles, California
- Hosted by: Rick Overton; Scott LaRose

Highlights
- Best Picture: The Crow

The 1995 Fangoria Chainsaw Awards ceremony, presented by Fangoria magazine and Creation Entertainment, honored the best horror films of 1994 and took place on May 6, 1995, at the LAX Sheraton in Los Angeles, California. The ceremony was hosted by comedians Rick Overton and Scott LaRose.

== Ceremony ==
The event was held as part of Fangoria's annual Weekend of Horrors convention, in partnership with Creation Entertainment. Attendees at the convention included Clive Barker, John Carl Buechler, Don Coscarelli, Barbara Crampton, Brad Dourif, Stuart Gordon, Steve Johnson, John Saxon, David J. Schow, George P. Wilbur.

== Winners and nominees ==
Best Wide Release	Best Limited Release
The Crow − Directed by Alex Proyas; Wes Craven's New Nightmare − Directed by Wes Craven; Mary Shelley's Frankenstein − Directed by Kenneth Branagh; Interview with the Vampire − Directed by Neil Jordan; Wolf − Directed by Mike Nichols	Phantasm III: Lord of the Dead − Directed by Don Coscarelli; Body Snatchers − Directed by Abel Ferrara; Cronos − Directed by Guillermo del Toro; Jack Be Nimble − Directed by Garth Maxwell; Trauma − Directed by Dario Argento
Best Actor	Best Actress
Brandon Lee − The Crow as Eric Draven / The Crow; Alexis Arquette − Jack Be Nimble as Jack; Tom Cruise − Interview with the Vampire as Lestat de Lioncourt; Robert De Niro − Mary Shelley's Frankenstein as The Creature; Jack Nicholson − Wolf as Will Randall	Heather Langenkamp − Wes Craven's New Nightmare as herself and Nancy Thompson; Gabrielle Anwar − Body Snatchers as Marti Malone; Jamie Lee Curtis − Mother's Boys as Judith "Jude" Madigan; Angela Featherstone − Dark Angel: The Ascent as Veronica; Michelle Pfeiffer − Wolf as Laura Alden
Best Supporting Actor	Best Supporting Actress
Antonio Banderas − Interview with the Vampire as Armand; Miko Hughes − Wes Craven's New Nightmare as Dylan Porter; Ron Perlman − Cronos; Angus Scrimm − Phantasm III: Lord of the Dead as The Tall Man; T. Ryder Smith − Brainscan as The Trickster	Kirsten Dunst − Interview with the Vampire as Claudia; Helena Bonham Carter − Mary Shelley's Frankenstein as Elizabeth Lavenza Frankenstein; Rochelle Davis − The Crow as Sarah Mohr; Piper Laurie − Trauma as Adriana Petrescu; Meg Tilly − Body Snatchers as Carol Malone
Best Screenplay	Best Score
Wes Craven's New Nightmare − Wes Craven; Cronos − Guillermo del Toro; Interview with the Vampire − Anne Rice; Jack Be Nimble − Garth Maxwell; Mary Shelley's Frankenstein − Steph Lady and Frank Darabont	The Crow − Graeme Revell; Body Snatchers − Joe Delia; Mary Shelley's Frankenstein − Patrick Doyle; Interview with the Vampire − Elliot Goldenthal; Wolf − Ennio Morricone
Best Make-Up/Creature FX	Worst Film
Interview with the Vampire − Stan Winston; The Puppet Masters − Greg Cannom; Mary Shelley's Frankenstein − Daniel Parker; Night of the Demons 2 − Steve Johnson; Phantasm III − Mark Shostrom and Dean Gates	Leprechaun 2 − Directed by Rodman Flender

== Fangoria Horror Hall of Fame ==
- Peter Cushing
- Heather Langenkamp

== Presenters ==
- Screaming Mad George - presenter for Best Score
- Brinke Stevens and Vernon Wells - presenters for Best Supporting Actor and Best Supporting Actress
- Cyris Voris - presenter for Best Screenplay
- Tom Rainone - presenter for Best Make-Up/Creature FX
- Johnny Legend - presenter for Worst Film
- Linnea Quigley - presenter for Best Actress
- Nicholas Worth - presenter for Best Actor
- Darin Scott and Rusty Cundieff - presenters for Best Limited Release
- Joe Dante - presenter for Best Wide Release
- Wes Craven - presenter for Fangoria Horror Hall of Fame
