= Reggie Bannister =

American musician, actor and producer (1945–2026)

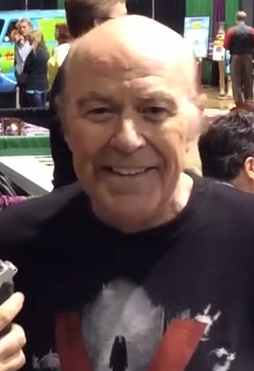
- Bannister in 2015
- Born: Reginald Horace Bannister; September 29, 1945; Long Beach, California, U.S.
- Died: August 9, 2026 (aged 80); Crestline, California, U.S.
- Occupations: Actor; musician; composer; screenwriter; film producer; make-up artist; activist
- Years active: 1975–2022
- Spouses: Susan McDonald Akalski (m. 1981; div. 1987) Gayle Bannister (m. 1988; div. 1997) Gigi Fast Elk Porter (m. 2001)
- Website: officialreggiebannister.com

Reginald Horace Bannister (September 29, 1945 – August 9, 2026) was an American musician, actor, producer, and writer. He is known for his role as Reggie in the Phantasm film series.

== Career ==
Bannister is known for playing the gun-toting, ex-ice cream man Reggie in the Phantasm film series directed by Don Coscarelli. Bannister co-starred in the films alongside A. Michael Baldwin, Bill Thornbury, and Angus Scrimm.

He appeared in several films and worked with such notables as Ossie Davis, Bruce Campbell and Andy Griffith.

Bannister played Herb Tooklander in the adaption of One for the Road, a short film sequel to Stephen King's Salem's Lot, which he co-produced with director Tim Sullivan and writer/director Paul Ward. The film also stars Adam Robitel and Audrey Walters.

In 2012, Bannister and his wife, Gigi, collaborated with co-writer Shelby McIntyre and co-writer/director Vito Trabucco on the comedy horror film Bloody Bloody Bible Camp. Bannister asked Tim Sullivan to co-produce and star in the film as the main villain, Sister Mary Chopper, and Sullivan accepted.

He composed the song "Have You Seen It" for Phantasm IV: Oblivion, and arranged "Sittin' Here at Midnight" with Bill Thornbury for Phantasm.

== Personal life and death ==
Bannister was a U.S. military veteran who served in Vietnam during the Vietnam War. In an interview, Bannister stated, "Getting back to the Vietnam thing. I was not for that war, I was against it, but there was this thing called the draft. I had friends who were going to Canada and I wasn't going to do that, I stand up to what's in front of me, and so just like anything else, I just thought, 'Soldier? Really? You're gonna be a soldier? Okay, well then you're going to be the baddest-ass soldier that ever put on a uniform.' So I just took that attitude, Landon, and just went for it. I was a head radio operator for an automatic weapons specialty group."

While in the service, Bannister was often around .30- and .50-caliber weapons, ultimately resulting in some hearing loss. Because of this, he was a service-connected disabled veteran, on top of which he was exposed to Agent Orange. Bannister took his GI bill from the military and used it to study acting.

Bannister resided in Crestline, California, where he lived with his wife.

In 2016, Bannister was diagnosed with Lewy body dementia and Parkinson's disease. On February 21, 2025, it was announced that Bannister's health was deteriorating and that he was going to begin receiving hospice care at his home in Crestline. He died on August 9, 2026, at his Crestline cabin at the age of 80.

== Filmography ==
- Kenny & Company (1976) – Donovan
- Jim the World's Greatest (1976) – O.D. Silengsly
- Phantasm (1979) – Reggie
- Phantasm II (1988) – Reggie
- Survival Quest (1989) – Pilot
- Silent Night, Deadly Night 4: Initiation (1990) – Eli
- That Little Monster (1994) – Twelvetrees
- Phantasm III: Lord of the Dead (1993) – Reggie
- The Demolitionist (1995) – Warden Thomas
- Wishmaster (1997) – Pharmacist
- Phantasm IV: Oblivion (1998) – Reggie
- Up Against Amanda (2000) – Lead Guitar Ted
- Bubba Ho-Tep (2002) – Care Home Administrator
- Cemetery Gates (2004) – Belmont
- Journeyman (2005) – McFearson
- The Mangler Reborn (2005) – Rick
- Last Rites (2006) – Mitchell
- Fallen Angels (2006) – Radar
- The Final Curtain (2007) – Gus
- The Rage (2007) – Uncle Ben
- Text (2008) – Reggie
- Metal Man (2008) – Dr. Arthur Blake
- The Quiet Ones (2008) – Mr. Martino
- Small Town Saturday Night (2008) – Victor
- Satan Hates You (2009) – Mickey
- Walking Distance (2009) – Webber
- Carnies (2009) – Detective Conrad Ellison
- Sawblade (2010) – Malcom
- One for the Road (2011) – Herb Tooklander
- Primitive (2011) – Dr. Stein
- Not Another B Movie (2011) – Umpire
- The Ghastly Love of Johnny X (2012) – King Clayton
- Bloody Bloody Bible Camp (2012) – Father Richard Cummings
- Phantasm: Ravager (2016) – Reggie
- The Obsidian Curse (2016) – Professor Reginald M. Sydow
- Bonejangles (2017) – Edgar Sr.

== Other work ==
- Making of 'Bubba Ho-Tep (2004)
- Phantasmagoria (2005)
- Phantasmagorical Mystery Tour (2005)
- Working with a Master: Don Coscarelli (2006)
- POV: An Actor's Insight (2009)
