= Transylvania Twist =

- Theatrical poster
- Directed by: Jim Wynorski
- Written by: R.J. Robertson; Jim Wynorski
- Produced by: Roger Corman; Alida Camp
- Starring: Robert Vaughn; Teri Copley; Steve Altman; Ace Mask; Angus Scrimm; Jay Robinson; Boris Karloff
- Cinematography: Zoran Hochstätter
- Edited by: Nina Gilberti
- Music by: Chuck Cirino
- Distributed by: Concorde Pictures
- Release date: 1989
- Running time: 90 minutes
- Country: United States
- Language: English
- Budget: $1 million

Transylvania Twist is a 1989 horror comedy film originally released by Concord Production Inc., distributed on home video by Metro-Goldwyn-Mayer. In the film Angus Scrimm reprises his role of the "Tall Man" from the Phantasm films, as a parody. The humor of the film is most often said to be in the style of Airplane!, and Mel Brooks comedies. It occasionally breaks the fourth wall rule with characters looking at the camera, and one even saying "I'm in the wrong movie". The film's main theme has been released on a variety of albums, and the entire soundtrack was released on CD and as a direct download in the year 2010, twenty-one years after the movies initial release.

It was directed by Jim Wynorski, who made over 150 films. In 2013 he said this film "comes closest to my personality and was the film I had the most fun making. It was the show I never wanted to end".

In the film, a female member of the Orlock family inherits her family's ancestral castle in Transylvania. A vampire cousin of the heiress is trying to use a stolen magical book to summon a monster to Earth. A vampire hunter of the Van Helsing family tries to cope with his new life as a vampire.

== Plot ==
The film opens with two short sequences before the main story line begins, first a prologue, and then a mock television advertisement. In the prologue, a seemingly helpless young woman is pursued by Jason Voorhees, Leatherface, and Freddy Krueger; she is then chased into a cave and reappears a few seconds later with an item from each of the three. She then faces the camera and laughs (showing her fangs) and says, "Amateurs!" The advertisement sequence is for a "mortuary, crematory, cemetery" called "Death City" where a salesman tries selling viewers "new and used coffins", with the help of his assistant Lovely Rita.

Dexter Ward (Steve Altman) enters a 'Death City' location, and is greeted by two morticians, one of which is noted science fiction anthologist Forrest J. Ackerman in a cameo appearance, who is holding a copy of Famous Monsters of Filmland. Dexter is there for the funeral of his uncle, who is suffering from a 'medical condition' and not actually dead. After helping his uncle out of the coffin and back to a library, Dexter is then sent by his uncle Ephram (Jay Robinson) to find and bring back The Book of Ulthar, a book of great power capable of unleashing terrible evil in the wrong hands; librarian Ephram had mistakenly let someone check it out. Dexter's search leads him to aspiring singing star Marissa Orlock (Teri Copley), who is about to be informed of the death of her father Marinas (Howard Morris), and her inheritance of Castle Orlock in Transylvania. Dexter goes with her to the castle.

Victor Van Helsing (Ace Mask), a professional vampire hunter, accompanies Marissa and Dexter to the castle as the executor of her father's estate. Count Byron Orlock (Robert Vaughn), and his three adopted-daughters who are also vampires are already at the castle. One of them is named Patricia (Monique Gabrielle) the seemingly helpless girl in the prologue. When 'viewing the will' they find out that Marissa has been left the castle and the money, while Orlock was left luggage. As a toss-up gift, they are left to find the book somewhere within the castle. Orlock is determined to find the book so that he can create an age of evil; assisting him is the butler Stephan (Angus Scrimm).

The book is finally found by Dexter but Byron steals it from him and uses it to summon an enormous monster called The Evil One (which was originally seen in It Conquered the World), but Dexter and Marissa (who is possessed by her ancestor of the same name) stops him, while Dexter is freed and destroys the book. The possessed Marissa blasts Byron with a lightning bolt. As he burns to death, Byron declares that he'll be back in the sequel.

Marinas, who was suffering from a cataleptic seizure and was not dead, tells Marissa that she must stay in the castle to ensure that the monster never returns; Helsing, who is now a vampire, also stays. Dexter arranges for Marissa to make her latest music video in the castle, with the help of her vampire cousins and Helsing.

The film ends with the local villagers, who throughout the film have been trying to find the castle so they can destroy it, finally give up and go home.

== Cast ==
- Robert Vaughn as Lord Byron Orlock
- Teri Copley as Marissa Orlock
- Steve Altman as Dexter Ward
- Ace Mask as Victor Von Helsing
- Angus Scrimm as Stefen
- Steve Franken as Hans Hoff
- Vinette Cecelia as Laverne
- Monique Gabrielle Patricia "Patty"
- Howard Morris as Marinas Orlock
- Jay Robinson as Uncle Ephram
- Lenny Juliano as Maxie Fields
- Joe Lerer as Hans Downe
- Clement von Franckenstein as Hans Hoff
- R.J. Robertson as Hans Phull
- Arthur Roberts as Hans N. Fritz
- Toni Naples as Maxine
- Frazer Smith as "Slick" Lambert
- Becky LeBeau as Rita
- Stu Nahan as Sports Announcer
- Jack Behr as Direttore
- Kelli Maroney as Hannah
- Michael Chieffo as Ed Norton Look-Alike
- Jon Locke as Mr. Sweeney
- Magda Harout as Peasant Woman
- Deanna Lund as Insegnante
- Brinke Stevens as Betty Lou
- Harriet Harris as Granny
- Michael Vlastas as James Vasvolakas
- Art Hern as Willoughby
- Dean Jones (credited as Dean C. Jones) as Pinhead
- Boris Karloff as Himself (archive footage)

== Inspirations, parodies, and puns ==
Mark Thomas McGee worked on an early draft of the script for about a week. He was fired at the request for Roger Corman who told Wynorski that he was difficult to work with.

Most of the film consists of silly moments of comedy and parody; e.g., when Pinhead steps out of an acupuncturist's office and says, "I don't care what anyone says — this hurts!" At one point, Dexter looks into a room and meets Boris Karloff (in a clip from the movie The Terror); in another, Dexter and Marissa step into a room that's apparently in 3-D, but because neither of them is wearing 3-D glasses, all they see is jumbled red and green.

Many of the films characters are parodies of other sources, including; Dexter Ward from The Case of Charles Dexter Ward, Byron Orlock from Targets, Van Helsing from Dracula, and the mock advertisement scene's Lovely Rita. Television shows are also referenced such as The Honeymooners, The Late Show, Meet the Press, The Twilight Zone, The Newlydead Game, and Wheel of Fortune. The film also contains puns such as "Vampires of the Caribbean", "Elvis has left the body", and "Papa-Oom-Mow-Mow" being spoken as part of the spell to summon the Evil One as well as classic gags such as a Pie in the face for the Ayatollah, and Dexter finding a Skeleton in the closet.

Films being parodied are:

- Nightmare on Elm Street: the character Freddy Krueger with Swiss Army knife glove.
- Casablanca
- The Exorcist: at the séance scene, including the spewing of green liquid from the mouth.
- Friday the 13th films: the character Jason Voorhees.
- The Haunted Palace: the summoning of the 'Evil One' scenes.
- Hellraiser: the character Pinhead.
- Horror of Dracula: meeting the daughters, Van Helsing pointing out blood on a vampire's mouth, and Byron throwing back of female vampire from her intended victim.
- It Conquered the World: the 'Evil One' creature.
- Night of the Living Dead: the lines "Yeah, they're dead--they're all messed up".
- Phantasm: the 'Tall Man' character with Angus Scrimm parodying himself in the role.
- Taxi Driver: the lines "You talking to me, no one else here you must be talking to me".
- Texas Chainsaw Massacre films: character Leatherface.
- The Terror: footage of Boris Karloff.

The film title comes from a line in the 1962 song "Monster Mash".

== Home media ==
The film was released on VHS on September 22, 1993, and on DVD on March 27, 2001.

== Reception ==
The film received mixed reviews, from positive reviews such as "what might be the best of the late-80′s wave of Naked Gun inspired horror spoofs", to the more negative reviews that state "moronic comedy about vampires, teenage vampire hunters and half-naked babes". One of its most positive reviews comes from Variety stating that "mixed into the cosmic stew are many delightful reflexive bits", and that it "is an occasionally hilarious horror spoof notable for the range of its comical targets".

- 2 1/2 stars out of 4 - TV Guide
- 2 1/2 stars out of 5 - Video Movie Guide 2002
- 2 stars out of 4 - Creature Features: The Science Fiction, Fantasy, and Horror Movie Guide
- 2 out of 4 - Cinefantastique review by J. P. Harris
- 1 1/2 Bones out of 4 - VideoHound's Golden Movie Retriever
- 1 1/2 stars out of 5 - All Movie.com
- 1 star out of 5 - AMC (TV channel)

== Soundtrack ==
After the film's original release its theme was released as part of the album "Vampire Circus (The Essential Vampire Theme Collection)" by Silva Screen Records in 1993. On the 1997 album "Vampire Themes" by Cleopatra Records, the band 'Ex Voto' remixes and reinterprets the main theme. The entire soundtrack was then officially released on June 7, 2010, when it was paired with the soundtrack to Not of This Earth also composed by Chuck Cirino. It is currently sold in Compact Disk, and direct download formats from various music sites.

Transylvania Twist

1. Amateurs
2. Transylvania Twist Main Titles
3. Just Give Me Action
4. Come To Castle Orlock
5. The Road To Hansberg/Van Helsing Before Dinner
6. Think Of The Royalties
7. Ancestors Of Orlock
8. Marinas' Service
9. Stefan's Favorite Musical Recording
10. The Newlydead Game
11. Seance For Lady Marissa
12. Trick Or Treat/Swing And A Miss
13. Marissa Points The Way/Dexter Finds The Book
14. The Evil One Appears
15. Destroy The Book
16. Transylvania Twist End Titles

Not of This Earth
17. Not Of This Earth Main Title
18. I'm Coming Home/Dining Out
19. Miss Story's Bedroom/First Communication
20. Several Hundred Questions
21. Sleeze-O-Mania
22. Birthday Girl
23. A Pound And A Half of Flesh
24. Footchase
25. Finding Out
26. Stop Running, Nadine
27. Driving Mr. Johnson
28. Not Of This Earth End Titles
Bonus Tracks
29. Transylvania Twist Suite
30. Chopping Mall Suite
31. Not Of This Earth End Titles (Alternate)
32. Death City

== See also ==
- Abbott and Costello Meet Frankenstein
- Dracula: Dead and Loving It
- Scary Movie
- Young Frankenstein
