= Oblivion IV =

Oblivion IV may refer to:

- The Elder Scrolls IV: Oblivion, 2006 video game
- Phantasm IV: Oblivion, 1998 horror film
