= Phantasm III: Lord of the Dead =

- Promotional release poster
- Directed by: Don Coscarelli
- Written by: Don Coscarelli
- Produced by: Don Coscarelli
- Starring: Reggie Bannister; A. Michael Baldwin; Angus Scrimm
- Cinematography: Chris Chomyn
- Edited by: Norman Buckley
- Music by: Fred Myrow; Christopher L. Stone
- Distributed by: Starway International, Inc.
- Release date: May 6, 1994
- Running time: 91 minutes
- Country: United States
- Language: English
- Budget: $2.5 million

Phantasm III: Lord of the Dead (also known as just Phantasm III) is a 1994 American science fantasy supernatural horror film written and directed by Don Coscarelli. The film stars Angus Scrimm as the Tall Man, Reggie Bannister, and A. Michael Baldwin. It is a sequel to Phantasm II (1988) and is the third installment in the Phantasm franchise. It was followed by Phantasm IV: Oblivion.

The film had a limited theatrical release in May 1994 through Starway International, Inc., before being released to home video by MCA/Universal Home Entertainment in October 1994.

== Plot ==
Immediately after his apparent demise at the end of the previous film, a new Tall Man emerges from his dimension fork. Meanwhile, after being ejected from the hearse carrying Mike Pearson and Liz Reynolds, a surviving Reggie watches as the hearse explodes. Reggie finds Liz dead, but saves Mike from the Tall Man by threatening to kill them all with a grenade. The Tall Man retreats with Liz's head, but promises to return when Mike recovers.

Two years later, a comatose and hospitalized Mike has a near death experience, where his deceased brother Jody appears, but is interrupted by the Tall Man. Awakening, Mike is attacked by a demonic nurse, but quickly subdues her. Reggie arrives as she dies, her scalp bursting open, revealing a cranial sphere that takes off through the window after seeing Mike awake. At Reggie's house, the Tall Man arrives via a dimensional fork, overpowers Reggie and transforms Jody into a charred sphere, before drawing Mike through the gate with him.

The next morning, Reggie travels to Holtsville, Idaho, which the Jody-sphere mentions. Upon arrival, Reggie finds it is a ghost town, and is captured by three looters, who lock him in the trunk of his 1970 Barracuda. Reggie is later rescued by a young boy named Tim, who kills the looters when they break into his house. When he and Reggie bury the looters in his yard, Tim tells Reggie how the Tall Man took his parents and destroyed Holtsville. In the morning, Reggie and Tim find the three graves empty and their pink hearse gone.

When the two depart Holtsville, Reggie attempts to leave Tim at an orphanage, but the boy hides in the trunk of his car. Reggie finds a mausoleum, where he encounters a sphere, and is accosted by two young women, Tanesha and Rocky, before he can destroy it. Reggie tries to warn them, but Tanesha is killed by the sphere. Tim appears, destroying the sphere with his pistol. Tim and Reggie join forces with Rocky, and soon come upon a convoy of hearses driven by Gravers, and decide to follow after. When they make camp at night, Jody approaches Reggie in a dream, taking him to the Tall Man's lair, where they rescue Mike. As Reggie wakes, Jody opens a portal and Mike emerges. The Tall Man tries to follow, but Reggie closes the portal, severing the Tall Man's hands.

After fighting off the Tall Man's minions, including the undead looters, they enter a large mausoleum in the city of Boulton. They discover a cryonics facility, where Mike recalls the Tall Man disliking cold. While Reggie, Rocky, and Tim are separated and attacked by the undead looters, Mike consults with the Jody-sphere in a psychic link. Jody explains that the Tall Man is amassing an army to conquer dimensions; they witness the Tall Man encasing the brains of his victims into spheres. The Tall Man senses their presence and recaptures Mike. Two looters, Rufus and Henry, wheel in Tim on a gurney, and Mike tries warning him of the thousands of spheres he witnessed, but is paralyzed. Rocky defeats her attacker, the looter Edna, and helps Reggie; Tim is freed by the Jody-sphere, and runs into Rufus and Henry, who are killed by the Jody-sphere and Reggie.

The trio crash into the embalming room, where the Tall Man is operating on Mike. Rocky impales the Tall Man with a spear dipped in liquid nitrogen, and they lock him in the freezer. However a golden sphere emerges from his head and attacks them. Reggie catches it in a plunger, and they submerge it into the nitrogen tank. Mike notices his head is bleeding yellow blood and finds a golden sphere beneath the skin. With his eyes like silver spheres and complaining of the cold, he runs away, telling Reggie to stay away from him. Jody imparts some cryptic words on Reggie, before transforming and leaving too.

Rocky departs from the group, leaving in a hearse. Tim reports that Mike tried to warn him, but thousands of spheres are waiting to attack, pinning Reggie to the wall. When Reggie tells Tim to run, a new Tall Man appears, and Tim is dragged by a zombie in the freezer through a glass window.

== Cast ==
- Angus Scrimm as The Tall Man
- A. Michael Baldwin as Mike Pearson
- Reggie Bannister as Reggie
- Bill Thornbury as Jody Pearson
- Kevin Connors as Tim
- Gloria Lynne Henry as Rocky
- Cindy Ambuehl as Edna
- Brooks Gardner as Rufus
- John Davis Chandler as Henry
- Irene Roseen as Demon Nurse
- Claire Benedek as Tim's mother
- Sarah Scott Davis as Tanesha

== Production ==
After studio interference forced out A. Michael Baldwin from the second film Phantasm II, he was brought back in Phantasm III: Lord of the Dead. Kerry Prior handled the sphere effects.

Principal photography took place largely in Southern California, with additional photography occurring in Washington state and Canada.

== Release ==
Following a screening for the Motion Picture Association of America, Phantasm III: Lord of the Dead was given an NC-17 rating due to its violent content, particularly the scene in which Sarah Scott Davis's character, Tanesha, is killed by one of the killer spheres. Coscarelli unsuccessfully appealed the rating, and the film was only granted an R rating after this sequence was significantly cut.

Phantasm III: Lord of the Dead had a test market limited theatrical release in two regions in May 1994: Baton Rouge, Louisiana, and Grand Rapids, Michigan. Despite the film performing well in these markets, Universal Pictures—who had distributed Phantasm II (1988)—declined to give the film a wide theatrical release. According to Reggie Bannister, Universal refused to distribute the film due to a conflict with director Don Coscarelli.

=== Home media ===
The film was released on VHS by MCA/Universal Home Entertainment in October 1994. In 1996, the Los Angeles Times reported that Phantasm III: Lord of the Dead was one of the top 100 highest selling video titles.

An unrated version of the film was released in 2007 by Anchor Bay Entertainment, featuring an audio commentary by A. Michael Baldwin and Angus Scrimm, a deleted scene, and behind-the-scenes footage. Well Go USA Entertainment released a Blu-ray edition on September 18, 2018.

== Reception ==
=== Critical response ===
On the review aggregator website Rotten Tomatoes, 38% of 8 critics' reviews are positive.

Dennis Hunt of the Los Angeles Times described the film as "just as gruesome, nightmarish and barely coherent as the first two," and recommended it only for fans of the previous two films. Michael Blowen of The Boston Globe gave the film an unfavorable review, describing it as "barely competent and gruesomely dull."

Jeremiah Kipp, reviewing the film for Slant Magazine, awarded it two and a half out of four stars and praised it for its dark humor, writing: "Coscarelli outdoes the humor of John Hughes in what feels like a more honest version of the gleeful sadism in Home Alone."

Scott Weinberg of Fearnet wrote that while the sequels lack the punch of the original, they are still entertaining. Steve Barton of Dread Central rated the film 3.5/5 stars and described the film's humor as "hit-or-miss."

=== Accolades ===
Institution	Year	Category	Recipient(s)	Result	Ref.
Fangoria Chainsaw Awards	1995	Best Limited Release/Direct-to-Video Film	Phantasm III: Lord of the Dead	Won	
Fangoria Chainsaw Awards	1995	Best Supporting Actor	Angus Scrimm	Nominated	
Fangoria Chainsaw Awards	1995	Best Makeup FX	Mark Shostrom; Dean Gates	Nominated	
Saturn Awards	1995	Best Genre Video Release	Phantasm III: Lord of the Dead	Nominated	

== Sequel ==
A sequel titled Phantasm IV: Oblivion, was released in 1998.

== See also ==
- Brain balls, projectiles made from human brains in the Irish Mythology

== Sources ==
- Coscarelli, Don (2018). True Indie: Life and Death in Filmmaking. New York City, New York: St. Martin's Press. ISBN 978-1-250-19324-7.
