= The Quiet Ones =

The Quiet One(s) may refer to:

- The Quiet One (film), a 1948 American documentary directed by Sidney Meyers
- The Quiet Ones (2010 film), an American horror film directed by Amel J. Figueroa
- The Quiet Ones (2014 film), a British horror film directed by John Pogue
- The Quiet Ones (2024 film), a Danish action film directed by Frederik Louis Hviid
- "The Quiet One" (song), by the Who, 1981
- "The Quiet Ones", a song by Oasis, a B-side of the single "The Importance of Being Idle", 2005
- The Quiet One, or Harumi, a fictional character from Ninjago

== See also ==
- "A Quiet One", a short story by Anne McCaffrey from her collection The Girl Who Heard Dragons
