= Roberto A. Quezada =

American film director

Roberto A. Quezada (born February 22, 1959, and a.k.a. Roberto Quezada-Dardon) is an American gaffer, cinematographer, and film producer best known for his work with Don Coscarelli including the Phantasm series and The Beastmaster. Quezada is also a film journalist and a Web site producer best known for his pioneering work with Amnesty International USA and Planned Parenthood Federation of America. His father is the Guatemalan journalist, poet, and fiction writer Roberto P. Quezada.

== Biography ==
Roberto A. Quezada was born in Guatemala and raised in the San Gabriel Valley in Southern California. He became interested in film while studying social science and philosophy at Santa Clara University and then transferred to UCLA in 1976 to study film. At UCLA, he was the recipient of the Jim Morrison Award for first films in 1977.

In 1977, he was hired by Don Coscarelli and Paul Pepperman as a second camera assistant on Phantasm. One week after the start of production the gaffer resigned and Quezada was promoted to take his place. Responsible for the lighting of Phantasm, finding many of the key locations (cemetery gates, alien planet, etc.) and various visual effects (photography of the silver sphere, the star gate room, door blowing off its hinges, etc.), Quezada was given the title of visual consultant on the finished film. He was also the assistant editor on the film with Dena Roth.

Four years later in 1981, after working on various films as a gaffer and director of photography and on commercials as a producer, he was again hired by Coscarelli and Pepperman as production supervisor on the film The Beastmaster. His responsibilities on this film included finding all the exterior locations; recruiting the production, camera, electric, and grip crews; and supervising the work of various special effects technicians along with the director and producer.

This film was followed by more projects on his own as a gaffer and director of photography until 1987 when Coscarelli tapped him again to work on Survival Quest initially as the director of photography and as producer. Two weeks into production, realizing the extreme difficulty of this dual role and the potential a close friend of his demonstrated as a cinematographer, Quezada hired Daryn Okada to complete the eight-week shooting schedule as director of photography.

Production of Phantasm II started shortly after this. Aside from being the line producer on this film, Quezada also found all the locations and was the second unit director and second unit cinematographer.

As a film journalist, Quezada has written extensively about the craft of film for Filmmaker magazine and was a founding editor of IndieWire.

As a web site producer, Quezada was a pioneer, developing the first magazine-style Web sites for Amnesty International USA in 1997 and for Planned Parenthood Federation of America in 1998. By they year 2001, plannedparenthood.org was "among the top 10 most frequently visited health websites in the world, with more than 650,000 visits and millions of hits per month."

Roberto A. Quezada is currently a photographer residing in Pennsylvania.

== Selected filmography ==
(by release dates)

- Phantasm (1979)
- The Frozen Scream (1978)
- The Unseen (1980)
- The Beastmaster (1982)
- My Best Friend's Birthday (1987)
- Phantasm II (1988)
- Survival Quest (1989)
- Pastime (1990)
- The Gifted (1999)
- Stars and Bars (2006)
