= Kenny & Company =

- Directed by: Don Coscarelli
- Written by: Don Coscarelli
- Produced by: Don Coscarelli
- Starring: Dan McCann; A. Michael Baldwin; Reggie Bannister; Ralph Richmond
- Cinematography: Don Coscarelli
- Edited by: Don Coscarelli
- Music by: Fred Myrow
- Distributed by: 20th Century Fox
- Release date: November 1976
- Running time: 90 minutes
- Country: United States
- Language: English

Kenny & Company is a 1976 American comedy-drama film directed by Don Coscarelli. It stars A. Michael Baldwin and Reggie Bannister, who would both later star in Coscarelli's Phantasm.

== Plot ==
The film covers the four days before Halloween as Kenny and his best friend Doug (both 12 years old) and awkward 11-year-old Sherman prepare for the holiday. They spend time playing flag football and skateboarding. The three boys must deal with a local bully, and Kenny gets his first crush on a girl. Kenny's beloved but elderly dog dies. The boys debut their costumes on Halloween, set off firecrackers as pranks, attend a neighbor's haunted house, and go trick-or-treating. The night culminates as they try to play a trick on an old woman who lives in a spooky, run-down house.

== Cast ==
- Dan McCann as Kenny
- A. Michael Baldwin as Doug
- Jeff Roth as Sherman
- Ralph Richmond as Big Doug
- Reggie Bannister as Donovan
- Clay Foster as Mr. Brink

== See also ==
- List of films set around Halloween
