= Fred Myrow =

American composer

Fredric Myrow (July 16, 1939 – January 14, 1999) was an American composer. He composed the soundtracks for Soylent Green, Scarecrow, and Phantasm. He was composer in residence of the Los Angeles Theatre Center in the mid-1980s, and before that at the New York Philharmonic. By the time of his death in 1999, he had scored dozens of films, collaborated on numerous theater projects, and released albums.

== Early life and musical beginnings ==
Myrow was the son of renowned composer Josef Myrow and grandson of equally renowned music publisher and promoter Irving Mills. He moved with his family to Hollywood when he was six, began composing at age nine, and in 1956 studied with Darius Milhaud in Aspen. Two years later he attended the University of Southern California's Thornton School of Music. In his freshman year, Russian composer Dmitri Shostakovich called Myrow one of the most inventive young composers he had seen during his tour of the United States. He encouraged the Young Musicians Foundation to commission a major work from Myrow, whose “Symphonic Variations” was played by the Debut Orchestra at the Hollywood Bowl when he was 21. It was subsequently performed by the Los Angeles Philharmonic, BBC, and Concerts Colonne in Paris, conducted by Lawrence Foster. Myrow went on to win three Fulbright grants, three Rockefeller grants, and a Guggenheim fellowship, which allowed him to live and study in Italy, and thence to become a resident composer at the New York Philharmonic under Leonard Bernstein, where he received a commission for an original work.

== Musical career ==
After the release of his first album, 1965's "Songs from the Japanese", Myrow decided to move beyond the world of classical music and undertook studies of world music. He was a friend of Jim Morrison and in 1969 provided the music for Morrison's experimental film HWY: An American Pastoral, with a further theatrical collaboration planned at the time of Morrison's death. The following year, Leo the Last was Myrow's first feature film score. John Boorman won Best Director at the 1970 Cannes Film Festival for the film. A few years later, in 1973, he scored Soylent Green, laying down a soundtrack that "is an arresting piece of work" with a "wide array of styles and often ingenious arrangements" and ultimately veering into "particularly bizarre an unnerving territory" The same year he scored Scarecrow, and closed the decade by co-writing the celebrated score for the film Phantasm. In 2015, the soundtrack was re-released on vinyl. In 2025 Waxwork Records released the complete score featuring unused film cues with the regular album on 3LPS.

His stage musical “Sure Feels Good” at the Los Angeles Actor's Theatre led to his joining Los Angeles Theatre Center. During his four-year tenure he produced forty concerts and scored twenty plays. In May 1993, his symphony “Frontiers,” commissioned by the National Endowment for the Arts was performed by the Los Angeles Philharmonic, another of his works conducted by Lawrence Foster. Myrow conducted the European premiere of the work with the Halle Orchestra in Manchester, England. The following year his ballet “Mango” premiered. Myrow was also a pianist, and gave live performances of his compositions. The American pianist Brad Mehldau dedicated a song in his solo piano suite Elegiac Cycle to Myrow, entitled "Goodbye Storyteller (for Fred Myrow)". Myrow had died of a heart attack two weeks before Mehldau's recording.

== Personal life and death ==
Fred Myrow and actress Elana Eden were married in 1969. They had three daughters together - Rachael, Shira and Neora - and remained married for three decades until his death, in 1999, of a heart attack, at their Hollywood Hills home. He was 59 years old.

His brother, Jeff Myrow is a television producer, director and writer.

Rachael Myrow, the Senior Editor of KQED's Silicon Valley News Desk, has said that "My dad's fame, especially with Phantasm, is for a particular subset of humanity: Gen-X males... Every now and then here at KQED, some guy of a certain age will rush up to me and say, 'Rachael Myrow, are you related to Fred Myrow?'"

== Filmography ==
- HWY: An American Pastoral (1969)
- Stop (1970)
- Leo The Last (1970)
- In Search Of America (TV movie) (1971)
- The Steagle (1971)
- A Reflection of Fear (1973)
- Lolly-Madonna XXX (1973)
- Scarecrow (1973)
- Soylent Green (1973)
- Message to My Daughter (TV movie) (1973)
- Pray for the Wildcats (TV movie) (1973)
- Threshold: The Blue Angels Experience (1975)
- Jim the World's Greatest (1976)
- Kenny & Company (1976)
- The Secret Life of John Chapman (TV movie) (1976)
- Phantasm (1979)
- On the Nickel (1980)
- Elephant Parts (1981)
- What's Up, Hideous Sun Demon (1983)
- Broken Rainbow (1985)
- Hour of the Assassin (1987)
- Journey to Spirit Island (1988)
- Phantasm II (1988)
- Survival Quest (1989)
- Rubin and Ed (1991)
- Phantasm III: Lord of the Dead (1994)
- Love Is a Gun (1994)
- Plan 10 from Outer Space (1994)
