= IndieWire =

Film industry and review website

- Logo used since 2016

- Screenshot of the website in December 2024
- Website type: Independent filmmaking news
- Available in: English
- Owner: Penske Media Corporation
- Editor: Brent Lang
- Website: indiewire.com
- Registration: Optional
- Launched: Newsletter: July 15, 1996; 30 years ago Website: January 12, 1998; 28 years ago
- Current status: Online
- Content license: All rights reserved. Use permitted with copyright notice intact.

IndieWire is a film industry and film criticism website that was established in 1996. The site's focus was predominantly independent film, although its coverage has grown to "include all aspects of Hollywood and the expanding universes of TV and streaming". IndieWire is part of Penske Media Corporation.

== History ==
Former logo used until 2016

The original IndieWire newsletter launched on July 15, 1996, billing itself as "the daily news service for independent film". Following in the footsteps of various web- and AOL-based editorial ventures, IndieWire was launched as a free daily email publication in the summer of 1996 by New York- and Los Angeles-based filmmakers and writers Eugene Hernandez, Mark Rabinowitz, Cheri Barner, Roberto A. Quezada, and Mark L. Feinsod.

Initially distributed to a few hundred subscribers, the readership grew rapidly, passing 6,000 in late 1997.

In January 1997, IndieWire made its first appearance at the Sundance Film Festival to begin their coverage of film festivals; it offered indieWIRE: On The Scene print dailies in addition to online coverage. Printed on site, in low-tech black-and-white style, the publication was able to scoop traditional Hollywood trade dailies Variety and The Hollywood Reporter due to the delay these latter publications had for being printed in Los Angeles.

The site was acquired by Snagfilms in July 2008. On January 8, 2009, IndieWire editor Eugene Hernandez announced that the site was going through a re-launch that has been "entirely re-imagined".

Penske Media acquired IndieWire on January 19, 2016. The financial terms of the agreement were not disclosed.

== Description ==
The focus of IndieWire initially was independent film, but has grown to encompass mainstream film, television, and streaming media. IndieWire is part of Penske Media.

It has a staff of 25 people, including publisher James Israel, editor-in-chief Brent Lang, editorial director Kate Erbland, executive editor Ryan Lattanzio, and editor-at-large Anne Thompson.

== Reception ==
In Wired, in 1997, Janelle Brown wrote: "Currently, IndieWire has little to no competition: trades like The Hollywood Reporter and Variety may cover independent film, but from a Hollywood perspective, hidden by a huge amount of mainstream news. As filmmaker Doug Wolens points out, IndieWire is one of the few places where filmmakers can consistently and reliably keep on top of often-ignored small film festivals, which films are opening and what other filmmakers are thinking."

In 2002, Forbes magazine recognized IndieWire, along with seven other entrants, in the "Cinema Appreciation" category, as a "Best of the Web Pick", describing its best feature as "boards teeming with filmmakers" and its worst as "glacial search engine". IndieWire has been praised by Roger Ebert.

In 2012, IndieWire won the Webby Award in the Movie and Film category.

In 2022, IndieWire's entire staff was honored as the Best Website, Traditional News Organization by the Los Angeles Press Club at its annual Southern California Journalism Awards, with judges noting that the site is "full of analysis of entertainment issues, not to mention the depth of most of the pieces that immediately pop up on the site. Quite compelling and thought-provoking."

In 2025 and 2026, the Los Angeles Press Club again honored IndieWire's entire staff as the Best Website, News Organization Exclusive to the Internet.

== IndieWire Honors ==
The IndieWire Honors is annually hosted in Los Angeles and is a flagship gathering from IndieWire that spotlights and awards top achievements in innovative filmmaking and television, honoring artists and cinema professionals and their new works every year. The December 2023 ceremony paid tribute to standout figures in film and television, from distinctive directors, such as Greta Gerwig for Barbie, Todd Haynes for May December and Chad Stahelski for John Wick: Chapter 4, to then-emerging talents who redefined narratives, including Lee Sung Jin for Beef and Nathan Fielder, alongside Benny Safdie, for The Curse.

In June 2024, IndieWire launched its first spring Honors awards ceremony event focused exclusively on television. The ceremony featured, among its most notable recipients, Quinta Brunson, who received the Visionary Award for her work on Abbott Elementary and Carol Burnett, honored with the Vanguard Award, for her decades-long career, including then-recent appearances in projects such as Palm Royale. Separate IndieWire Honors events have also recognized film talent. At one such ceremony, Fielder accepted the Wavelength Award with the remark: "I find it hard to get on anyone's wavelength. Now I'm getting an award for being the best at it." Lily Gladstone used her Performance Award speech to call for the release of her Sundance film Fancy Dance (2023), which later secured distribution.

The December 2024 film-focused awards recognized Pamela Anderson, Selena Gomez, Jennifer Lopez, RaMell Ross, Denis Villeneuve, and additional luminaries. In June 2025, a then-fresh group of television standouts—including Mara Brock Akil, Kathy Bates, Colin Farrell, Natasha Lyonne, Ben Stiller, and others—were feted at the television edition.

== Critics poll ==
The IndieWire Critic's Poll is an annual poll by IndieWire that recognizes the best in American and international films in a ranking of 10 films on 15 different categories. The winners are chosen by the votes of the critics from IndieWire and other invited critics from around the world.
