= Phantasm IV: Oblivion =

- Promotional release poster
- Directed by: Don Coscarelli
- Written by: Don Coscarelli
- Based on: Characters by Don Coscarelli
- Produced by: Don Coscarelli
- Starring: A. Michael Baldwin; Reggie Bannister; Bill Thornbury; Heidi Marnhout; Bob Ivy; Angus Scrimm
- Cinematography: Chris Chomyn
- Edited by: Scott J. Gill
- Music by: Christopher L. Stone
- Production company: Starway International
- Distributed by: Orion Home Video (United States); Starway International (Internationally)
- Release dates: August 4, 1998 (Fantasia International Film Festival); October 13, 1998 (U.S.)
- Running time: 90 minutes
- Country: United States
- Language: English
- Budget: $650,000

Phantasm IV: Oblivion (stylized as Phantasm: OblIVion and also known as Phantasm: Oblivion) is a 1998 American science fantasy horror film written, produced and directed by Don Coscarelli and stars A. Michael Baldwin, Reggie Bannister and Angus Scrimm. A sequel to Phantasm III: Lord of the Dead (1994), it is the fourth installment in the Phantasm franchise. The film was followed by Phantasm: Ravager.

== Plot ==
Picking up where the previous film left off, Mike Pearson escapes Boulton mortuary in a hearse, while Reggie is trapped by The Tall Man's spheres. Rather than kill Reggie, the Tall Man releases him, telling Reggie their final "game" begins. Mike's brother Jody, still a black sphere that can occasionally resume his human form, contacts Reggie to search for Mike. On his way, Reggie survives a demon attack, and rescues a woman named Jennifer from a car accident.

Meanwhile, Mike tries to escape his transformation, driving through abandoned areas, recalling the last days of his youth before The Tall Man's arrival. After seeing visions of the elderly Fortune Teller he consulted years ago, the Tall Man appears, declaring he is taking Mike "to prepare for passage." Mike is taken to Death Valley, where he attempts suicide by hanging. However the Tall Man intercedes and shows him conflicting memories of when he and Jody attempted to kill the Tall Man years ago. Forbidden from taking his own life, Mike sees the Tall Man offer his hand, implying he wishes to guide him. Refusing, Mike escapes through a dimension fork, which takes him back in time.

Mike emerges from an early version of the gateway in an 1860s era laboratory. There, Mike is greeted by a kind man, Jebediah Morningside, an elderly scientist and creator of the gate who looks exactly like the Tall Man. Mike is frightened away after seeing Jebediah and that the Fortune Teller is mysteriously present. In the desert, Mike realizes he is slowly developing telekinesis when he kills a dwarf with a large boulder. Jody appears to him, but a distrustful Mike accuses him of abandoning him. Mike begins working on the hearse's engine, using parts to build a makeshift sphere. Meanwhile, Reggie and Jennifer stay at an abandoned motel, where he tells her about The Tall Man. Jennifer is soon revealed to be one of his minions, with two spheres in place of her breasts. Reggie manages to fight her off and kill her.

Mike goes through a gate, finding himself in a deserted city where he escapes the Tall Man, with Jody's help. Reggie arrives at Death Valley and fights off a group of dwarfs, shortly before Mike and Jody reappear. Mike warns Reggie not to trust Jody before departing yet again. Mike and Jody pass through the gate to Jebediah's house. Invisible to the old man, they witness him approach the inter-dimensional gate to learn the secrets of the world of the dead. Mike unsuccessfully tries to stab Jebediah, who vanishes and moments later is replaced by the Tall Man incarnation who emerges in his place. Mike escapes through the gate again, and Jody attacks him under the Tall Man's thrall.

Awakening on an embalming slab, Mike uses a tuning fork to immobilize Jody and the Tall Man as they attempt to cut open his head, before making the Tall Man kill Jody. The Tall Man quickly revives and pursues Mike to Death Valley. Reggie tries to shoot the Tall Man, but is overpowered. Mike summons the sphere he created and impales The Tall Man's neck, before activating the hearse's motor to explode, seemingly destroying him before a new Tall Man immediately comes through the gate, and removes the golden sphere from Mike's head, before departing. While Reggie goes on to pursue the Tall Man. Left to die, Mike recalls a childhood memory where Reggie gave him a ride; they both hear their future exchange before Reggie's departure. The younger Mike brushes it off, declaring "it's just the wind."

== Cast ==
- Angus Scrimm as The Tall Man
- A. Michael Baldwin as Mike Pearson
- Reggie Bannister as Reggie
- Bill Thornbury as Jody Pearson
- Bob Ivy as Demon Trooper
- Heidi Marnhout as Jennifer

== Production ==
Canadian filmmaker Roger Avary, a self-professed hardcore fan of the Phantasm series, wrote an epic screenplay titled Phantasm 1999 as a sequel to Phantasm III: Lord of the Dead. It was set in a post-apocalyptic near future and would feature Bruce Campbell as a co-star. As the project ran into financing difficulties, Don Coscarelli wrote and directed Phantasm IV: Oblivion as a precursor to the project, using numerous outtakes from the preceding films. Avary also appeared in the film as one of the Civil War soldiers. Despite these efforts, the budget for the sequel, now retitled Phantasm's End, could not be secured.

Oblivion's budget was considerably lower than the previous two Phantasm films. While Phantasm II had a budget of $3,000,000 and Phantasm III: Lord of the Dead had a budget of $2,500,000, the filmmakers were only able to secure $650,000 to make Phantasm IV: Oblivion. The filmmakers had to be inventive with the budget, much like the first film, which had only $300,000 budget. For the Civil War dream sequence, a Civil War reenactment group was hired in exchange for a $200 donation. Because the production could afford to build only a few sets, several key scenes were filmed in the desert, making this the only Phantasm movie without significant scenes inside a mausoleum setting, except the very beginning and toward the end. Filming took place largely in Death Valley and Lone Pine, California.

The swarm of spheres was done by several fans of Phantasm, who then showed it to Reggie Bannister who, in turn, showed it to Coscarelli. KNB EFX group also helped out a bit on the film as a favor to Coscarelli.

== Release ==
Phantasm IV: Oblivion had its world premiere at the Fantasia International Film Festival in Montreal, Quebec, Canada on August 4, 1998.

=== Home media ===
Phantasm IV: Oblivion was released directly to video in the United States by Orion Home Video on October 13, 1998, with pre-order screening cassettes were released on July 14, 1998.

On August 1, 2000, MGM Home Entertainment released VHS and DVD editions of the film.. The film was re-released on DVD on August 26, 2008, by Anchor Bay Entertainment. News reports indicated the Anchor Bay release would be the uncut version, however, the special edition contains only the R-rated version (as did the MGM release).

The film was released on Blu-ray on September 18, 2018, by Well Go USA.

== Reception ==
On the review aggregator website Rotten Tomatoes, 29% of 7 critics' reviews are positive.

Jeremiah Kipp of Slant Magazine gave Phantasm IV: Oblivion a mixed review, awarding it a two out of four-star rating, and writing: "The freewheeling atmosphere of dread more than make up for the incoherence, but Phantasm IV: Oblivion at times feels like an expensive, 35mm home movie made by some kids in their backyard."

== Sequel ==
Rumors of a sequel were reignited in June 2007 by footage contained in Don Coscarelli's Farewell to The Alamo Drafthouse, featuring Angus Scrimm and A. Michael Baldwin in their roles. However, in an interview with Reggie Bannister that surfaced on YouTube, Bannister stated there was no activity or development involving a fifth installment but that anything was possible in the future.

On March 25, 2014, it was announced that a fifth installment in the series, Phantasm: Ravager, had been filmed secretly. The film was released on October 7, 2016. Angus Scrimm would pass away in 2016, making this his final, and posthumous, Phantasm film in the original film series.

== Sources ==
- Coscarelli, Don (2018). True Indie: Life and Death in Filmmaking. New York City, New York: St. Martin's Press. ISBN 978-1-250-19324-7.
