= Phantasm: Ravager =

- Theatrical release poster
- Directed by: David Hartman
- Written by: David Hartman; Don Coscarelli
- Based on: Characters by Don Coscarelli
- Produced by: Don Coscarelli
- Starring: Reggie Bannister; A. Michael Baldwin; Bill Thornbury; Kathy Lester; Gloria Lynne Henry; Dawn Cody; Stephen Jutras; Angus Scrimm
- Cinematography: David Hartman; Brad Baruh
- Edited by: David Hartman; Jhoanne Reyes; Michael Miles
- Music by: Christopher L. Stone
- Distributed by: Well Go Entertainment
- Release dates: September 25, 2016 (Austin's Fantastic Fest); October 4, 2016 (VOD); October 7, 2016 (US)
- Running time: 85 minutes
- Country: United States
- Language: English

Phantasm: Ravager (sometimes stylised as Phantasm: RaVager, and also known as Phantasm V: Ravager) is a 2016 American science fantasy action horror film directed by David Hartman, who co-wrote it with Don Coscarelli. The film stars A. Michael Baldwin, Reggie Bannister in his final appearance as Reggie, and Angus Scrimm in his final appearance as the Tall Man. It serves as a sequel to Phantasm IV: Oblivion (1998) and is the fifth and final installment in the Phantasm franchise.

== Plot ==
Following the previous film, Reggie has wandered the desert in pursuit of the Tall Man. There, he is given a ride by a passing motorist, who happened to have stolen Reggie's Barracuda. Reggie throws the thief out and they are attacked by spheres which kill the thief. While fending off the spheres, Reggie suddenly awakens at a nursing home, much older, in a wheelchair. He is visited by a still living Mike Pearson, who claims that Reggie has been diagnosed with dementia. Reggie tries to recall his experiences, which Mike believes to be a dream.

In the apparent dream world, Reggie meets a woman named Dawn on the road, and gives her a lift. They reach a farmhouse, where a Bulgarian man Demeter works. Reggie tells Dawn about his encounters with The Tall Man, and tries to woo her. The Tall Man soon appears and Reggie awakes in another hospital from the 1860's. Lying in bed next to him is Jebediah Morningside, the elderly scientist the Tall Man possessed; Morningside has a somber talk with Reggie, but his demeanor suddenly changes to the Tall Man. Reggie sees the Tall Man's Lady in Lavender avatar physically conjoined, warning Reggie that he cannot escape. The next morning Reggie looks for Dawn, and discovers she's been killed by spheres, which also kill Demeter, as Reggie fights them off.

In the "waking" world, Reggie speaks with Mike, who talks about a theory of parallel universes. In his "dream", Reggie finds himself in the woods and encounters a gigantic sphere hovering in the sky. Reggie alternates between his "dream" and the present "waking world". When both see and enter a gate, they encounter The Tall Man, and the two discuss how their paths keep crossing. The Tall Man offers to return Reggie's family to him if he ceases meddling in his affairs. Reggie refuses and is sent to a mortuary, where Reggie fights the Tall Man's dwarves and kills the Lady in Lavender. Confronting the Tall Man, Reggie demands he give Mike and Mike's brother Jody back. The Tall Man belittles Reggie's loyalty, and casts him away.

Reggie seemingly awakens in another nightmare world, strapped to a gurney before two masked people. One is Chunk, a man with dwarfism, and the other is the woman Reggie knew as "Dawn"; she introduces herself as "Jane" and doesn't recall their encounter. After fighting off the Tall Man's minions, Jane and Chunk take Reggie to their resistance team, which includes Mike who tells Reggie he's been "on ice" for a decade, and that their world belongs to The Tall Man now. In the present, Reggie continues alternating between his "waking" and "dream" worlds, and is approached by Mike yet again. Mike reveals he's been having these dreams as well, and recalls surviving their last encounter with the Tall Man, who unleashed an alien plague that collapsed society and conquered the world, leaving a surviving resistance to fight against him.

In their "nightmare" world, Jane is captured by The Tall Man, luring Mike, Reggie and Chunk through a gate to his dimension. On the Red Planet, they confront The Tall Man and his minions, where Jane is killed. Chunk, posing as a dwarf next to The Tall Man, blows himself up to try to destroy him, while Mike and Reggie escape. In the "waking" world, Reggie sees into the "nightmare", and fights gravers alongside Mike. A living Jody picks them up in Reggie's Barracuda, fitted with onboard machine guns. In the "nightmare", the trio plan to head north, where the Tall Man is repelled by cold. In the "waking" world, the elderly Reggie passes away with Mike and Jody at his bedside.

In a mid-credits scene, in the "nightmare" world, a surviving but maimed Chunk emerges from a dimension gate on a desert road, where he meets up with a surviving Rocky. He flirts with her as she patches him back up, before they are picked up by Mike, Jody and Reggie. As they depart, several giant spheres are seen looming over ruined cities, as the war with The Tall Man still wages on.

== Cast ==
- Angus Scrimm as The Tall Man
- Reggie Bannister as Reggie
- A. Michael Baldwin as Mike Pearson
- Dawn Cody as Dawn/Jane
- Stephen Jutras as Chunk
- Bill Thornbury as Jody Pearson
- Kathy Lester as The Lady in Lavender
- Gloria Lynne Henry as Rocky
- Daniel Roebuck as Demeter
- Solly Duran as Raina
- Daniel Schweiger as Thief

== Production ==
=== Development ===
In 2004, six years after the release of Phantasm IV: Oblivion, series director Don Coscarelli told Fangoria: "I'd also still like to do another Phantasm film. Reggie Bannister and Angus Scrimm are still in great shape and raring to go."

In March 2005, Coscarelli was in the final stages of talks with New Line Cinema to produce a new entry. A reported wrote the new film was "being developed as a relaunch and as a possible trilogy about Mike's coming of age". This version never came to fruition.

Rumors about a sequel were reignited in June 2007 by footage contained in Don Coscarelli's Farewell to the Alamo Drafthouse, featuring Angus Scrimm and A. Michael Baldwin in their roles. In an interview, Reggie Bannister stated there was no activity or development of a fifth film but that anything was possible in the future.

=== Filming ===
In June 2012, rumors again surfaced that Coscarelli would begin a new Phantasm sequel. According to a report on Dread Central, the script was completed and filming would begin later in the year. Coscarelli disputed this claim, publicly stating: "I have no solid news to report on a new project now." He was being coy with film news sites. According to what Coscarelli and new cowriter/director David Hartman told Entertainment Weekly, the film was shot secretly in and around Southern California during 2012 and 2013.

=== Post-production ===
On March 26, 2014, news of Phantasm: Ravager's completion was released via various film news sites. The next day, a trailer debuted on the film's official site. In a 2014 "sneak peek" video preview on the official Phantasm website, director Hartman mentioned : "This thing is going to be in the can 2015... for sure." By October 2015, Ravager was completed and awaited a distributor.

Production on the film was briefly halted when Coscarelli supervised a 4K restoration of the original Phantasm. On January 9, 2016, actor Angus Scrimm, who played the Tall Man, died at age 89.

== Release ==
=== Theatrical ===
Phantasm: Ravager premiered in Austin's Fantastic Fest on September 25, 2016. It was released in the United States in theaters and via digital HD on October 7, 2016. The film and its predecessors were digitally remastered for home media soon thereafter.

== Reception ==
=== Critical response ===
Rotten Tomatoes, a review aggregator, reports that 57% of 14 surveyed critics gave the film a positive review; the average rating is 5.1/10. Metacritic, another review aggregator, rated it 51/100 based on seven reviews. Joe Leydon of Variety and Marten Carlson of Consequence of Sound both criticized the film's narrative cohesiveness. Leydon speculated that the film's troubled production may have caused this, and Carlson more directly blamed the film's origin as a series of shorts. Both said this will probably cause outsiders to be confused by the film. In comparing it to the previous films, Carlson said it "captures the heart, if not the quality", though fans will likely forgive its faults, as they did the first film. Leydon, though describing it as "a patchwork quilt of outtakes from its four predecessors", also cited the appeal to fans to revisit their favorite characters. Though recognizing the film's narrative weakness, Michele Galgana of ScreenAnarchy wrote, "Still, it's impossible to overlook the fun that you see all these guys having, and their hearts are all in the right place."

Simon Abrams of Roger Ebert.com gave the film two and a half stars saying the "CGI-intensive action scenes are distractingly ugly-looking. The camerawork is also amateurish, and the film's drab, undistinguished dialogue is only interesting when it's explicitly calling back to the original Phantasm." Marten Carlson of Consequence of Sound criticized the look of the film saying "at its best, though, the film’s cheap production is impossible to ignore. The cinematography is flat and appears to have been shot on a consumer HD camera. The special effects are achieved primarily with low-grade CGI that’s laughable at times." Carlson ultimately said: "All formal complaints aside, Ravager is successful in its attempt to capture the spirit of the series. Phantasm has always been about family, the love between brothers and friends, and seeing Reggie and Mike together again, we can only feel the sincerity of their relationship." Reviewers at Bloody Disgusting were split with Trace Thurman placing it on his "5 Worst Horror Movies of 2016" yet John Squires loved it. Both agreed the film looked like a "cheaply-made student film".
