= Gangs of the Dead =

2006 film directed by Duanne Stinnett

- German DVD cover
- Directed by: Duanne Stinnett
- Written by: Duanne Stinnett; Krissan Shipley
- Produced by: David Todd Ocvirk; Krissann Shipley
- Starring: Enrique Almeida; Reggie Bannister
- Cinematography: Yasu Tanida
- Edited by: Keith Henderson
- Music by: Sean Murray
- Production company: Outside Productions
- Release date: June 30, 2006
- Running time: 90 minutes
- Country: United States
- Language: English

Gangs of the Dead, originally Last Rites, is a zombie survival film released in 2006, starring Enrique Almeida and Reggie Bannister.

== Plot ==
The film takes place in the city of Los Angeles, California, and follows two intertwined plots.

The main plot concerns a meteorite that crashes in Los Angeles. It carries alien spores that spread across the city, transforming humans into flesh-eating zombies.

The other story is about two rival gangs, "The Lords of Crenshaw" and "El Diablo", who continue to fight for dominance of Los Angeles even as it falls to the zombie horde.

== Cast ==
- Enrique Almeida as Santos
- Howard Alonzo as Jerome
- Reggie Bannister as Mitchell
- Stephen Basilone as O'Bannon
- James C. Burns as Campbell

== Release ==
The film was first released under its original title of Last Rites at the Los Angeles Film Festival on June 30, 2006. It was later released direct to video on May 1, 2007 under the new title of Gangs of the Dead.

In both Germany and Italy, the film was released under the title of City of the Dead.

In the United Kingdom, the film was released under the title of 48 Weeks Later, in an effort to capitalise on the success of 28 Weeks Later, which had been released in 2007.
