= Survival Quest =

- Film poster
- Directed by: Don Coscarelli
- Written by: Don Coscarelli
- Produced by: Dac Coscarelli; Roberto A. Quezada
- Starring: Lance Henriksen; Dermot Mulroney; Mark Rolston; Steve Antin; Paul Provenza; Ben Hammer; Dominic Hoffman; Catherine Keener; Traci Lind; Michael Allen Ryder
- Cinematography: Daryn Okada
- Edited by: Don Coscarelli
- Music by: Fred Myrow; Christopher L. Stone
- Distributed by: Metro-Goldwyn-Mayer
- Release date: November 10, 1989
- Running time: 96 minutes
- Country: United States
- Language: English
- Box office: $62,683

Survival Quest is a 1989 survival film starring Lance Henriksen, Catherine Keener and Dermot Mulroney. It was written and directed by Don Coscarelli, and distributed by MGM/United Artists.

== Plot ==
There are two sets of campers on California's Sierra Madre Mountain. One group is the Blue Legion, a gun-happy squad of teenaged boys under the command of tyrannical survivalist Jake Cannon. The other bunch, Survival Quest, is a sort of backpacking self-help group led by humane mountain man Hank Chambers.

The beneficiaries of Hank's wisdom include smart-aleck Joey, fragile divorcee Cheryl, and alienated convict Gray. Through various exercises and object lessons beneath the sheltering pines, firm-but-gentle Hank teaches this crew to work together.

Meanwhile, Jake has made harassment of the Survival Questers part of his curriculum. When a viciously ill-mannered Blue Legion member named Raider ends up shooting Hank, this breach of discipline annoys Jake to no end.

While Jake was harassing the Survival Questers, Jake actually wanted no one to get shot. Jake starts beating Raider up, and Raider responds by stabbing Jake and blaming it on the Survival Questers.

Now led by Raider, the Blue Legion aims to kill the rival campers. Cheryl is now in charge of the Survival Quest gang, because they think Hank is dead. They hang together and race over the river and through the woods to get to the nearest airstrip.

There, Gray tricks Raider into getting close to a flammable fuel tank, then Gray uses a shotgun to blast the tank, causing an explosion that kills Raider.

As the smoke from this rises on the breeze, an airplane appears. On board is Hank, who managed to overcome his wound and signal for help after he tried to help Jake, who has died.

== Cast ==
- Lance Henriksen as Hank Chambers
- Mark Rolston as Jake Cannon
- Steve Antin as Raider
- Michael Allen Ryder as Harper
- Paul Provenza as Joey
- Ben Hammer as Hal
- Dominic Hoffman as Jeff
- Traci Lind as Olivia
- Dermot Mulroney as Gray Atkinson
- Catherine Keener as Cheryl
- Reggie Bannister as Pilot
- Brooke Bundy as Olivia’s Mother
- Dean Scofield as Olivia’s Fiancé

== See also ==
- List of cult films
