= Chloe Coscarelli =

American vegan chef

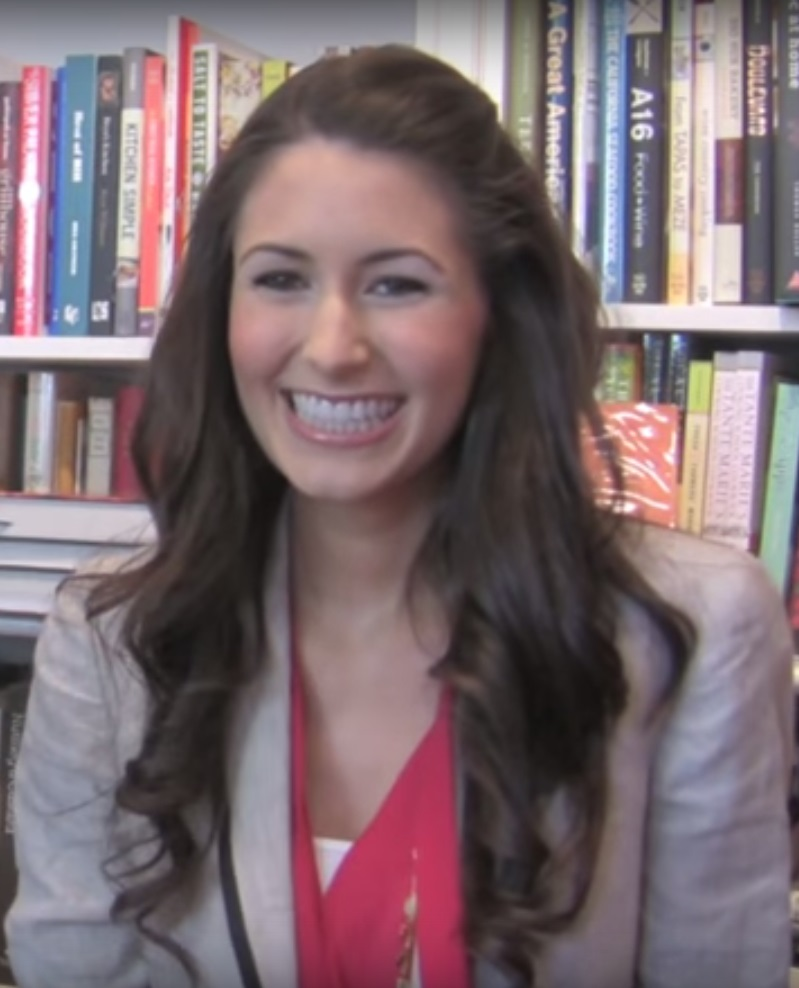
- Chloe Coscarelli in 2012
- Born: Chloe Kay Coscarelli; October 14, 1987 (age 38); Los Angeles, California, U.S.
- Education: University of California, Berkeley
- Occupations: Vegan chef; author
- Years active: 2009–present
- Relatives: Don Coscarelli (father)
- Website: www.chefchloe.com

Chloe Kay Coscarelli (born October 14, 1987) is a vegan chef and author.

== Early life and education ==
Chloe Kay Coscarelli is the daughter of filmmaker Don Coscarelli. Chloe Coscarelli was born in Los Angeles, California, and grew up in the nearby city of Pacific Palisades. She is a graduate of UC Berkeley, and the National Gourmet Institute in New York City, where she discovered her love for cooking.

== Career ==
A summer internship at Millennium, a gourmet vegan restaurant located in San Francisco, led to a course of study at the Natural Gourmet Institute in New York City. Coscarelli was a contestant in Cupcake Wars, her vegan cupcakes garnering her first prize. She became the first vegan to win a culinary competition on television and was named to the 2017 Class of 30 Under 30 by Forbes.

From 2020-2022, Whole Foods partnered with Coscarelli to create prepared vegan holiday meals for Thanksgiving.

In 2022, Club Med also partnered with Coscarelli to add vegan meals "at all eight of its all-inclusive resorts in Mexico and the Caribbean."

In 2023, Tasting Table named Coscarelli as one of the "21 Plant-Based Chefs You Need To Know," and VegNews listed her as one of the "37 Creative Chefs Crafting the Future of Vegan Food."

=== By Chloe ===
In mid-2015, Coscarelli partnered with ESquared Hospitality to open the vegan fast casual restaurant By Chloe (stylized by CHLOE) on Bleecker Street in the West Village of New York City. By 2017 the chain comprised five locations in Brooklyn and Manhattan, with additional locations in Los Angeles, Providence, and Boston. In July 2017, Coscarelli was forced out by ESquared in an arbitration award after she filed suit in 2016 over control of the company. In December 2020, By Chloe filed for bankruptcy.

In 2021, it was acquired by "a consortium of investors that already had stakes in the company," and rebranded as "Beatnic."

=== CHLOE ===
In July 2024, Coscarelli announced the opening of a new vegan restaurant named CHLOE in Greenwich Village, New York City. The new establishment is located at the original By Chloe site on Bleecker Street. This follows a legal dispute with her former parent company, ESquared Hospitality LLC, which led to her departure from By Chloe in 2017.

== Works ==
In 2012, she published her first cookbook, Chloe's Kitchen, followed by Chloe's Vegan Desserts in 2013, Chloe's Vegan Italian Kitchen in 2014, and Chloe Flavor in 2018. Chloe's Vegan Desserts was named one of the 16 best vegan cookbooks for 2023 by Food & Wine, and VegNews listed both Chloe's Kitchen and Chloe’s Vegan Desserts as "Top 100 Vegan Cookbooks of All Time" in 2024.

== Awards and honors ==
Year	Awards and Honors	Event
2020	Favorite Vegan Chef: Chloe Coscarelli & Isa Chandra Moskowitz (tie)	VegNews: 2020 Veggie Awards
