= Paula Irvine =

American actress (born 1968)

- Born: June 22, 1968 (age 57); Hollywood, California
- Occupation: Actress
- Years active: 1976-1994 (as actress)

Paula Irvine (born June 22, 1968) is an American actress. Irvine began acting in 1976 by making guest appearances. In 1988 she starred in Phantasm II playing Liz Reynolds, and in 1990 she also appeared on Beverly Hills, 90210 during the first season as Sheryl and on Growing Pains as Lori McNeil. She is best known for her portrayal of the second Lily Blake Capwell on the NBC daytime drama Santa Barbara from 1991 to 1993. In 1994, she portrayed Rebecca Dalton in episode 12 of series 2 of Renegade.

She retired from acting in 1994 to attend college and pursue a career in communications.
