= Gloria Lynne Henry =

American actress

- Born: Detroit, Michigan, U.S.
- Education: Wayne State University
- Occupations: Actress, singer
- Notable work: Phantasm III: Lord of the Dead
- Relatives: Brian Hardgroove (cousin)

Gloria Lynne Henry is an American actress perhaps best known for the role of Rocky in the film Phantasm III: Lord of the Dead.

Henry was born in Detroit, Michigan and her first experience in front of the camera was when she was cast as Rocky in Don Coscarelli's Phantasm III: Lord of the Dead. Henry has also had roles in The Devil's Advocate and Robert Redford's The Horse Whisperer. Henry reprised her role as Rocky in the 2016 horror sequel Phantasm: Ravager.

After receiving her B.F.A. in theater arts at Wayne State University in Detroit, she helped to create a children's theater program at Detroit's Attic theater. She has also performed as lead singer in the funk, rock band Chatter, which was originally formed by her cousin Brian Hardgroove, the bass guitarist of the rap group Public Enemy.

== Media ==
DVD Talk praised Henry’s performance in Phantasm III, “Throw a sassy black lady named Rocky (Gloria Lynne Henry who pops up briefly in The Devil's Advocate) with a penchant for beating her opponents into submission with her nunchaku and you've got yourself quite a team.”

The Hollywood Reporter wrote about Henry’s return as Rocky in Phantasm: Ravager, “Fan-favorite character Rocky (Gloria Lynne Henry) from Phantasm III: Lord of the Dead, indicates that, like many of their characters, few horror franchises stay dead forever.”

== Filmography ==
Year	Title	Role	Notes
1994	Phantasm III: Lord of the Dead	Rocky	
1997	The Devil's Advocate	Tiffany	
1998	The Horse Whisperer	Member of Magazine Staff	Uncredited
2016	Phantasm: Ravager	Rocky	
2025	Southern Nightmare	Ruby	
