= The Quiet Ones (2010 film) =

- Directed by: Amel J. Figueroa
- Written by: Amel J. Figueroa
- Starring: Courtney Gains, Reggie Bannister, Bill Allen
- Release date: June 5, 2010 (Hoboken International Film Festival)
- Country: United States
- Language: English

The Quiet Ones, also known as Hush, is a 2010 American independent horror film directed by Amel J. Figueroa.

The film stars Courtney Gains, Reggie Bannister, Bill Allen, Adam C. Edwards and others.
