= Jim the World's Greatest =

1976 film by Don Coscarelli

- Directed by: Don Coscarelli; Craig Mitchell
- Written by: Don Coscarelli; Craig Mitchell
- Produced by: Don Coscarelli
- Starring: Gregory Harrison; Reggie Bannister; Angus Scrimm; Marla Pennington
- Cinematography: Don Coscarelli; Rexford L. Metz; Craig Mitchell
- Edited by: J. Terry Williams
- Music by: Fred Myrow
- Distributed by: Universal Pictures
- Release date: January 1976
- Running time: 94 minutes
- Country: United States
- Language: English
- Budget: $250,000

Jim the World's Greatest is a 1976 drama film written and directed by Don Coscarelli and Craig Mitchell. The movie began production when Coscarelli and Mitchell were 18-year-olds, while being financed by their parents at a stated cost of $250,000.

== Plot ==
Jim Nolan (Gregory Harrison) is a high school teenager who lives with his father (Angus Scrimm) and his younger brother Kelly (Robbie Wolcott) in a dingy apartment in a bad part of town. During the day, Jim is a popular high school kid, attending classes and playing on the school football team. At night, he works at a fast-food restaurant, earning money to help keep the family solvent.

The father is an alcoholic salesman who often disappears for long stretches and is physically abusive to Jim's younger brother. One day, Jim confronts his father about his violent behavior. His father reveals that he believes Kelly was the product of an illicit extramarital affair. Jim does not share this information with his younger brother. When the father continues to abuse Kelly, Jim insists that he leaves the house. Jim assumes the role of primary caregiver for Kelly and the sustainer of the household.

Some time later, Jim comes home from his night job to find his brother dead in the bathtub. Convinced that his father was responsible for his brother's death, Jim waits outside of the pub his father frequents. Unknown to him, the father has been watching him from a darkened area along a wall. Jim's father calls later and asks to meet up so that he can explain what happened. Jim at first plans to kill his father, but drops his weapon when he sees his father. The father stands near by, unsure of whatever response he might receive from Jim.

== Cast ==
- Gregory Harrison as Jim Nolan
- Robbie Wolcott as Kelly Nolan
- Rory Guy as Jim's father, Mr. Nolan
- Marla Pennington as Jan
- Karen McLain as Lisa
- David Lloyd as Brian
- Reggie Bannister as O.D. Silengsly

== See also ==
- List of American films of 1976
