= Angus Scrimm =

American actor (1926–2016)

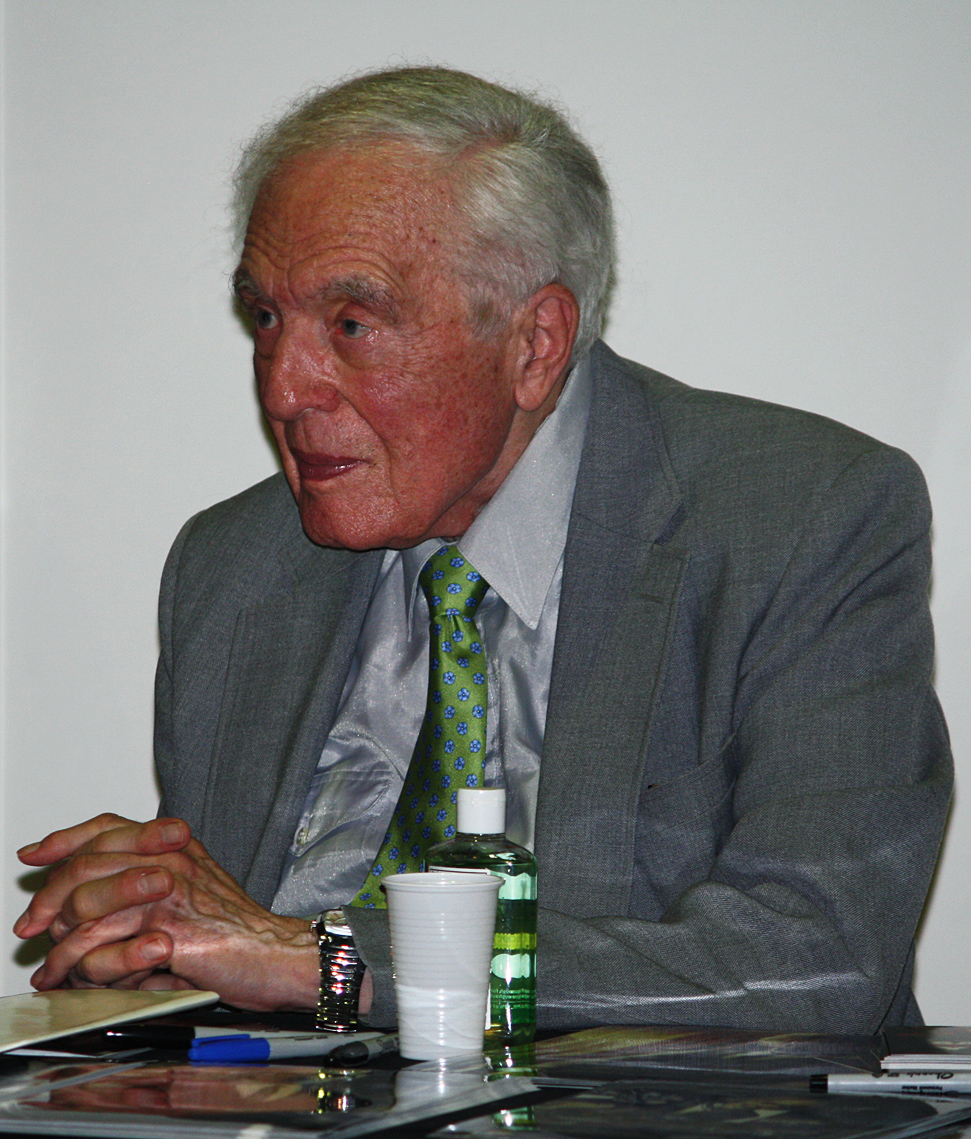
- Scrimm in 2011
- Born: Lawrence Rory Guy; August 19, 1926; Kansas City, Kansas, U.S.
- Died: January 9, 2016 (aged 89); Los Angeles, California, U.S.
- Education: University of Southern California
- Occupations: Actor; author
- Years active: 1973–2016

Angus Scrimm (born Lawrence Rory Guy; August 19, 1926 – January 9, 2016) was an American actor, author, and journalist, known for his portrayal of the Tall Man in the 1979 horror film Phantasm and its sequels.

== Early life ==
Scrimm was born in Kansas City, Kansas, to Alfred David and Pearl Guy. Scrimm graduated from the University of Southern California, where he majored in drama.

He was originally a journalist and wrote and edited for TV Guide, Cinema Magazine, the Los Angeles Herald Examiner and many other publications. He also worked for Capitol Records, writing liner notes for many LPs and CDs for artists ranging from Frank Sinatra to the Beatles, as well as Arthur Rubinstein and Itzhak Perlman. Scrimm won a Grammy (credited as Rory Guy, as were his early film roles) for his liner notes to the 1974 album Korngold: The Classic Erich Wolfgang Korngold.

== Career ==
Scrimm had several minor supporting roles in the early 1970s before being cast as the Tall Man, the chief villain in Don Coscarelli's independent horror film Phantasm (1979). Scrimm stood approximately 6 feet 4 inches (1.93 m). To appear even taller when playing the Tall Man, he wore suits that were several sizes too small and platform shoes. His Phantasm role led to a steady acting career in horror films, as well as theater and television. Scrimm had a recurring role as an SD-6 agent on Alias.

== Death ==
On January 9, 2016, Scrimm died at the age of 89 from prostate cancer in Tarzana, Los Angeles, California.

== Filmography ==
Year	Title	Role	Notes
1973	The Severed Arm	Mailman	Uncredited
1973	Sweet Kill	Henry	As Rory Guy
1973	Scream Bloody Murder	Doctor Epstein	As Rory Guy
1976	Jim the World's Greatest	Jim's Father	As Rory Guy
1977	A Piece of the Action	Monk	As Lawrence Guy
1979	Phantasm	The Tall Man	As Angus Scrimm
1980	Witches' Brew	Carl Groton	
1980	Nightkill		Scenes deleted
1984	The Lost Empire	Dr. Sin Do/Lee Chuck	
1986	Chopping Mall	Dr. Carrington	As Lawrence Guy
1988	Phantasm II	The Tall Man	
1989	Transylvania Twist	Stefan/The Tall Man	
1990	Subspecies	King Vladislas	
1992	Mindwarp	The Seer	
1993	Deadfall	Dr. Lyme	
1994	Munchie Strikes Back	Kronas	
1994	Phantasm III: Lord of the Dead	The Tall Man	
1997	Wishmaster	Narrator	
1998	Phantasm IV: Oblivion	The Tall Man	
2004	The Off Season	Ted	
2005	Masters of Horror: Incident On and Off a Mountain Road	Buddy	
2006	Automatons	The Scientist	
2006	Satanic	Dr. Barbary	
2008	I Sell The Dead	Doctor Quint	
2009	Hollywood Horror		
2009	Satan Hates You	Dr. Michael Gabriel	
2012	John Dies at the End	Father Shellnut	
2014	Disciples	Winston	
2015	Always Watching: A Marble Hornets Story	Percy	
2015	Tales From Beyond The Pale Podcast: The Tribunal of Minos	Theodore Dade	Voice Actor
2016	Phantasm: Ravager	The Tall Man	Released posthumously
2017	Dances with Werewolves	Neumann	Released posthumously
