= Phantasm (film) =

American horror film

- Theatrical release poster
- Directed by: Don Coscarelli
- Written by: Don Coscarelli
- Produced by: D.A. Coscarelli
- Starring: Michael Baldwin; Bill Thornbury; Reggie Bannister; Kathy Lester; Angus Scrimm
- Cinematography: Don Coscarelli
- Edited by: Don Coscarelli
- Music by: Fred Myrow; Malcolm Seagrave
- Production company: New Breed Productions
- Distributed by: Avco Embassy Pictures
- Release date: March 28, 1979
- Running time: 89 minutes
- Country: United States
- Language: English
- Budget: $300,000
- Box office: $22 million

Phantasm is a 1979 American supernatural horror film directed, written, photographed, and edited by Don Coscarelli, and stars A. Michael Baldwin, Bill Thornbury, Reggie Bannister, Kathy Lester, and Angus Scrimm. The first installment of the Phantasm franchise, the film follows Mike, a teenager in a small Oregon town who, along with his older brother Jody and family friend Reggie, investigates strange goings-on at the local funeral home, which is operated by a mysterious mortician known as "the Tall Man".

Coscarelli based Phantasm on a nightmare he had as a teenager, which he developed into a rough screenplay. The film was a fully independent production, financed by Coscarelli, his father, and local investors, and with a cast and crew made up mostly of amateurs and aspiring professionals. The film was shot over the course of a year, mainly in and around Chatsworth, California. Coscarelli continued to alter and develop the screenplay throughout the filming process. A months-long post-production followed, during which the film underwent significant editing.

Avco Embassy Pictures acquired Phantasm for theatrical distribution in the United States, premiering it in Los Angeles in the spring of 1979. Following its expanded theatrical release, the film went on to become a box office hit, with an international gross of $22 million. It was met with mixed reviews from film critics, though it garnered praise for its visual elements and unique screenplay. In the years since its original release, it has become a cult film with a devoted following. It has appeared on several critics' lists of the best horror films and has been cited as a significant influence on the horror film genre. Film scholars have noted Phantasm for its surrealistic qualities and prominent themes of mourning, loss, and sibling relationships.

In 2015, the film underwent restoration supervised by Coscarelli and the production company Bad Robot, whose co-founder J. J. Abrams is an outspoken fan of the film. The restored version of the film was given a limited theatrical release in 2016, followed by several Blu-ray releases in the United States and United Kingdom.

== Plot ==
While having sex with a woman in Morningside Cemetery, a young man named Tommy is stabbed to death by the woman, who is revealed to be the local mortician, in supernatural disguise as "The Lady in Lavender". At the funeral, Tommy's friends, Jody Pearson and Reggie, state they believe he died by suicide. Jody's 13-year-old brother Mike secretly observes the funeral and sees the mortician—dubbed "The Tall Man"—placing Tommy's heavy coffin, with seemingly little effort, back into the hearse instead of completing the burial. Mike visits a local fortune teller and tells her what he saw. She has him stick his hand in a box, and at first, something seems to grab it, but then he removes it unharmed after being told not to be afraid.

Later, Jody is seduced by the Lady in Lavender and taken to the cemetery to have sex. However, they are interrupted by Mike, who has been following Jody and has been driven out of his hiding place by a short, hooded figure. Mike tries to tell Jody about the hooded figure, but Jody dismisses him. Inside the mausoleum, Mike is chased by a flying silver sphere and accosted by a caretaker, but escapes when the sphere kills the caretaker. Mike then flees the Tall Man and slams a door to escape; the Tall Man's fingers get caught and cut off, but continue to move, dripping yellow ichor. Taking one of the fingers with him, Mike escapes the mausoleum.

The still-moving finger is enough to convince Jody about Mike's stories. Before Jody can bring the finger to the sheriff, it transforms into a flying insect. Reggie, who witnesses the insect attack them, joins the brothers in their suspicions. Jody goes to the cemetery alone but is chased away by dwarves and a seemingly driverless hearse. He is rescued by Mike in Jody's Plymouth Barracuda. Running the hearse off the road, they discover that it was driven by one of the hooded figures, a re-animated and shrunken Tommy, whom they hide in Reggie's ice cream truck.

Reggie and Jody resolve to defeat the Tall Man, while Mike is hidden at an antique store owned by Jody's friends Sally and Sue. There, Mike discovers an old photograph of the Tall Man and insists on being taken home. On the way, Mike, Sally, and Sue come across the overturned ice cream truck. They are attacked by a mob of hooded dwarves. Mike manages to escape, presuming the girls and Reggie are dead.

Jody locks Mike in his bedroom for safety and goes to the mausoleum to kill the Tall Man. Mike escapes, but runs into the Tall Man, who is waiting for him outside his front door. He kidnaps Mike in a hearse, but Mike escapes and causes the hearse to strike a pole and explode. Looking for Jody in the mausoleum, Mike is targeted by the silver sphere until Jody destroys it with a shotgun. Mike and Jody are reunited with Reggie, and together they enter a brightly lit room filled with canisters containing more dwarves. Mike catches a brief glimpse through an interplanetary portal or wormhole, seeing a red, hot world where the dwarves are toiling as slaves.

A sudden power outage separates the trio. Left alone in the room, Reggie activates the portal, creating a powerful vacuum from which he narrowly escapes. In the ensuing storm, Reggie is stabbed by the Lady in Lavender while Jody and Mike flee, and the mausoleum vanishes. Jody devises a plan to trap the Tall Man in an abandoned mine shaft. The Tall Man attacks Mike at home and chases him outside, eventually falling into the mine shaft where he is buried under an avalanche of rocks triggered by Jody.

Mike then wakes up in his bed, still worried about the Tall Man. Reggie, still alive, says that Jody died in a car wreck the week before; everything Mike experienced thus far was a grief-induced nightmare. Promising to look after Mike, Reggie proposes a road trip. When Mike enters his bedroom to pack, the Tall Man appears, and hands crash through the bedroom mirror, pulling Mike inside.

== Cast ==
- Angus Scrimm as The Tall Man
- A. Michael Baldwin as Mike Pearson
- Bill Thornbury as Jody Pearson
- Reggie Bannister as Reggie
- Kathy Lester as Lady in Lavender
- Bill Cone as Tommy
- Kenneth V. Jones as the Caretaker
- Mary Ellen Shaw as Fortuneteller
- Terrie Kalbus as Fortuneteller's granddaughter
- Laura Mann as Double Lavender
- Susan Harper as Sue
- Lynn Eastman as Sally
- David Arntzen as Toby

== Themes ==
Film scholar John Kenneth Muir interprets Phantasm as being about mourning and death. The protagonist, Mike, is grieving the death of his parents and is on the cusp of young adulthood. The imagery alternates between the mundane and the surreal, blurring the lines between reality and nightmare while exploring the broader themes of confronting death, grief, and coming of age.

Many of the film's fans are adolescent boys or men who saw it during adolescence. According to star Angus Scrimm, the film "gives expression to all their insecurities and fears". Scrimm states that the theme of loss and how, by fantasizing about death, the young protagonist Mike Pearson deals with the deaths in his family drives the story. Don Coscarelli identifies it as a "predominantly male story" to which young teens respond. Scrimm explains the popularity of the film as fans responding to themes of death, and the Tall Man himself represents death. Muir describes the Tall Man as embodying childhood fears of adults and states that the Tall Man wins in the end because dreams are the only place in which death can be defeated. American views of death are another theme, of which Coscarelli said:

I had a compunction to try to do something in the horror genre, and I started thinking about how our culture handles death; it's different than in other societies. We have this central figure of a mortician. He dresses in dark clothing, he lurks behind doors, and they do procedures on the bodies we don't know about. The whole embalming thing, if you ever do any research on it, is pretty freaky. It all culminates in this grand funerary service production. It's strange stuff. It just seemed like a great area to make a film.

Dreams and surrealism are also important elements of Phantasm. In Dark Romance: Sexuality in the Horror Film, author David J. Hogan describes the film as "very much like a dream. It provocatively bends the rules of the real world as it rushes to meet horror after horror." Marc Savlov of the Austin Chronicle compares Phantasm to the works of Alejandro Jodorowsky and Luis Buñuel in terms of strangeness. Savlov describes the film as existentialist horror and "a truly bizarre mix of outlandish horror, cheapo gore, and psychological mindgames that purposefully blur the line between waking and dreaming." Gina McIntyre of the Los Angeles Times describes the film as surreal, creepy, and idiosyncratic. Muir writes that Phantasm "purposely inhabits the half-understood sphere of dreams" and takes place in the imagination of a disturbed boy.

Alex DiVincenzo, writing for Bloody Disgusting in a 2024 retrospective on the film, summarized that the film is "ultimately about Mike coming to terms with the passing of Jody, portrayed as the cool older sibling every adolescent wishes they had. Mike confronts his fear by dreaming up a final adventure with his dearly departed brother, in which they defeat death itself, represented by The Tall Man. Upon doing so, he’s awakened to the harsh reality that Jody died in a car accident, allowing Mike to reach the final stage of grief: acceptance."

== Production ==
=== Development ===
Most of the ideas for Phantasm were developed by Coscarelli from a nightmare he had as a teenager, in which he was chased down a long corridor by a flying chrome sphere which he feared would drill his brain out. After seeing the audience reaction to jump scares in Kenny & Company, Coscarelli, who was the writer and director for the film, decided to do a horror film as his next project. His previous films had not performed well, and he heard that horror films were always successful; branching into horror allowed him to combine his childhood love of the genre with better business prospects. The original idea was inspired by Something Wicked This Way Comes by Ray Bradbury. Coscarelli had initially sought to adapt the story into a film, but the license had already been sold. The theme of a young boy's difficulty convincing adults of his fears was influenced by Invaders from Mars (1953). Dario Argento's Suspiria (1977) and its lack of explanations was another influence on Coscarelli. The soundtrack was influenced by Goblin and Mike Oldfield. The synthesizers used for the film were so primitive that it was often difficult to reproduce the same sound twice. When writing the film's conclusion, Coscarelli intentionally wanted to shock audiences and "send people out of the theater with a bang."

=== Casting ===
Coscarelli cast the film using actors who had appeared in his previous work, often writing the parts exclusively for them. Michael Baldwin's character of Mike Pearson was written specifically for him after Baldwin appeared in a minor role in Coscarelli's second feature, Kenny & Company (1976). Coscarelli attributes the enduring popularity of the film to young audiences who responded to the character of Mike and his adventures throughout the film.

After being intimidated by Scrimm on the set of a previous film, Jim the World's Greatest (1976), Coscarelli decided that Scrimm would make a great villain and cast him as the Tall Man. Initially, Scrimm had little input on the character, but began contributing to the character's construction after Coscarelli began to trust his instincts. Scrimm was outfitted in lifts and a suit too small for him in order to make him seem even taller and skinnier. Coscarelli says of Scrimm: "I really didn't have any idea that he would take it to the level that he did. ... I could see it was going to be a very powerful character."

Coscarelli based the character of Reggie on his friend Reggie Bannister, for whom the role was also written. Reggie was designed to be an everyman, a loyal friend, and serve as comic relief in the film.

The Tall Man character also appears in the shapeshifting form of the Lady in Lavender, a female figure he embodies to seduce and kill Tommy, Jody's friend. In this role, Coscarelli cast Kathy Lester, with Laura Mann appearing as Lester's double, credited as Double Lavender.

=== Filming ===
There were no accountants on the set, but Coscarelli estimates the budget at $300,000. Funding for the film came in part from Coscarelli's father, who was credited as the film's producer; additional funding came from doctors and lawyers. Coscarelli's mother designed some of the special effects, costumes, and make-up, receiving credit under several alternate pseudonyms. Coscarelli commented: "We decided to do that because it would look too ridiculous otherwise. There were already too many Coscarellis in the credits as it is." The cast and crew were made up mainly of Coscarelli's friends and other aspiring professionals. Due to their inexperience, they did not realize that firing blanks could be dangerous; Coscarelli's jacket at one point caught fire from a shotgun blank. Because he could not afford to hire an editor or cameraman, Coscarelli also performed these duties himself.

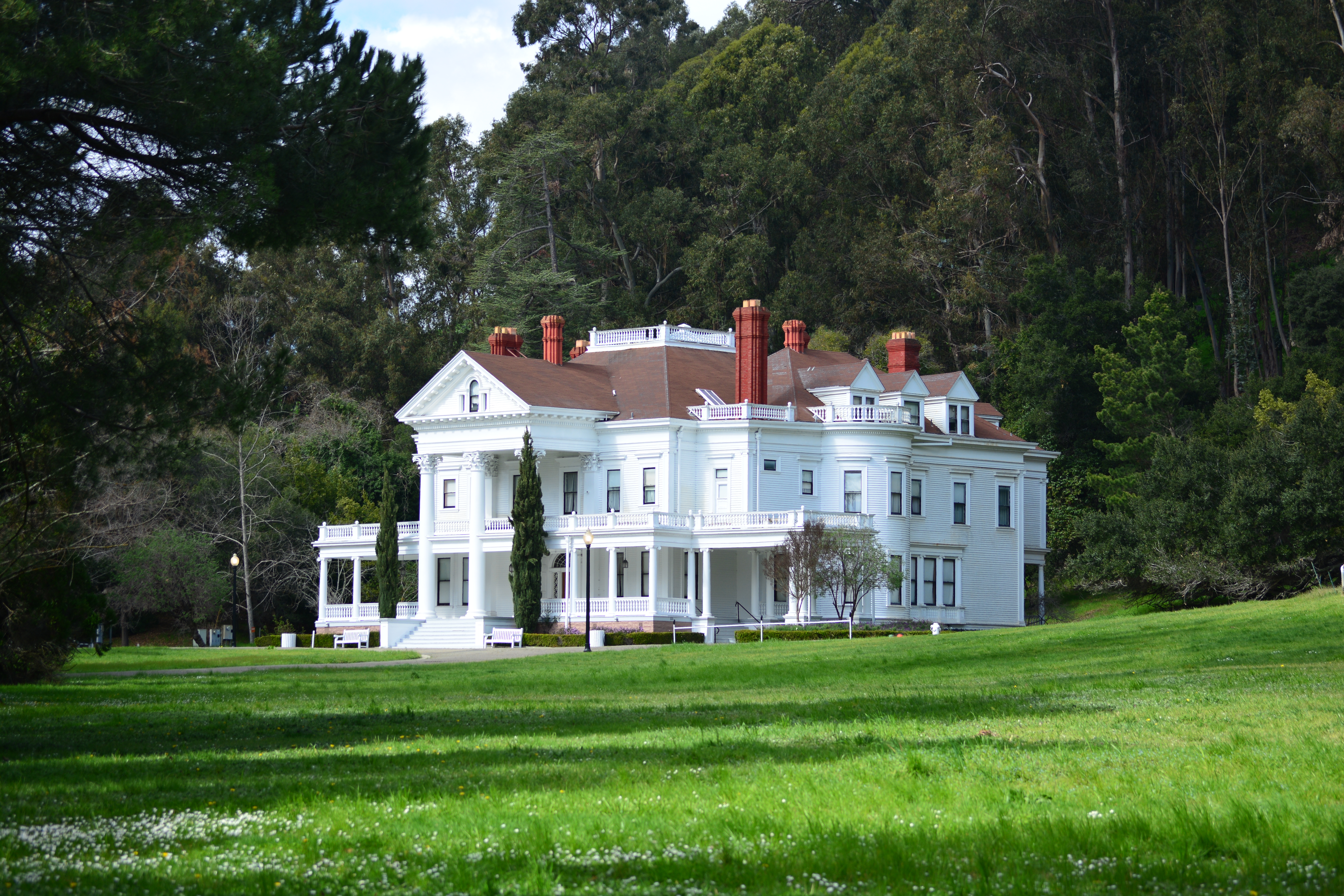
The Dunsmuir House in Oakland, California served as the exterior for the Morningside Mortuary

Filming began in 1977 and was done on weekends and sometimes lasted for 20 hours a day over the course of more than a year. Actor Reggie Bannister, who performed most of his own stunts in the film, described the production as "flying by the seat of our pants." The actors would often be called to perform their scenes and picked up as soon as they were available.

Though the film is set in Oregon, principal photography took place primarily in the San Fernando Valley in Chatsworth, California. An ice cream shop on main street was filmed on the outskirts of San Diego County in Julian, California. The exteriors of the Morningside Mortuary were shot at Oakland's Dunsmuir House in Northern California. Due to logistic and budgetary restrictions, the interiors of the mausoleum were constructed in a local warehouse in the L.A. area.

The script changed often during production, and Bannister says he never saw a completed copy; instead, they worked scene by scene and improvised. The script was characterized by Coscarelli as "barely linear". While it contained the basic concepts of the completed film, the script was unfocused and rewritten during filming. The concept of the spheres came from one of Coscarelli's personal nightmares, but the original idea did not involve drilling. Will Greene, an elderly metalworker, fashioned the iconic spheres, but he never got to see the finished film, as he died before the film was released. The black 1971 Plymouth Barracuda was used because Coscarelli had known someone in high school who drove one, and he realized it was a vehicle he could easily get access to.

=== Post-production ===
Post-production took another six to eight months. The first test screening was poorly received due to the film's length; Coscarelli says that he erred in adding too much character development, which needed to be edited out. Phantasm's fractured dream logic was due in part to the extensive editing. During shooting, they did not have a clear idea of the ending. Several endings were filmed, and one of them was re-used in Phantasm IV: Oblivion. Coscarelli attributed the freedom to choose from among these endings to his independent financing.

== Music ==
Fred Myrow and Malcolm Seagrave composed the original score for Phantasm. Waxwork Records released the score in a three-LP vinyl set in January 2025, restored from the original tape masters.

== Release ==
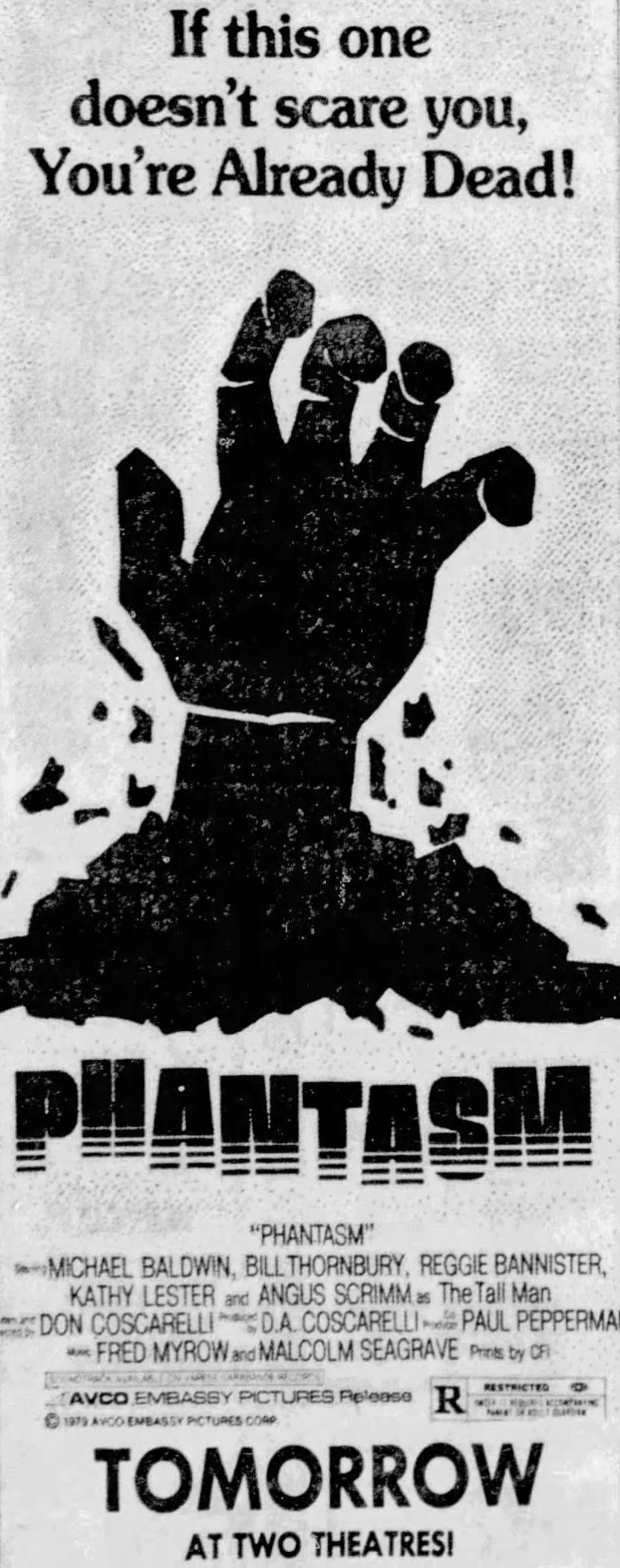
Phantasm advertisement in the The Fresno Bee, 1979

To solicit outside opinions, Coscarelli paid an audience to watch an early cut of the film. Although Coscarelli called the result "a disaster," he was encouraged by the audience's reactions to the film. According to Coscarelli, Phantasm was shopped to executives at "every major studio," but each passed on the film. The financial success of the film Halloween released the prior year convinced vice-president of marketing at Avco Embassy Pictures, Robert Rehme, to purchase Phantasm for distribution.

Avco Embassy released Phantasm regionally, making 500 prints for theatrical distribution. The film opened on March 28, 1979, in California and Texas, followed by releases in the southeastern United States and the Pacific Northwest. The film premiered in New York City on June 1, 1979. Coscarelli recalled that the platformed regional release "worked great" because it allowed for him and Angus Scrimm to travel to different regions of the country to promote the film: "Angus would wear his costume and make-up and we’d be on these morning shows and Angus would be glaring into the camera with his arched eyebrows at like 7 a.m."

The film was released in Australia under the alternative title The Never Dead, to avoid confusion with the similarly named 1976 Australian softcore porn film Fantasm.

=== Home media ===
Magnetic Video released Phantasm on LaserDisc, Betamax, and VHS in 1981. Embassy Home Entertainment released it on VHS in 1984, and later reissued it through Nelson Entertainment, after Embassy was sold to Coca-Cola in 1985 and renamed. Metro-Goldwyn-Mayer Home Entertainment later issued a VHS and special edition DVD in August 1998 after acquiring rights to Avco Embassy's catalogue. Anchor Bay Entertainment subsequently re-released it on DVD on April 10, 2007.

==== Restoration ====
In late 2015, Coscarelli showed a work-in-progress 4K resolution restoration of Phantasm (dubbed Phantasm: Remastered) at the Butt-Numb-A-Thon film festival. It was supervised by Coscarelli at Bad Robot. Bad Robot became involved when director J. J. Abrams, a fan of the Phantasm series, requested a screening of the film. Coscarelli told him that he did not have a high-quality print, but Abrams volunteered the use of his technicians for a restoration. The completed restoration premiered at South by Southwest in March 2016. The remastered version of the film was released in limited theaters in the United States in conjunction with Art House Theater Day, on September 24, 2016.

The restored version of Phantasm was released on Blu-ray on December 6, 2016, by Well Go USA. It was later included in a 2017 multi-film Blu-ray set featuring the entire Phantasm series, and again in 2021 in a similar box set which included a full-scale replica of the sphere featured in the films. In the United Kingdom, Arrow Films issued a region B Blu-ray box set in 2017 featuring the sphere as part of the packaging.

== Reception ==
=== Box office ===
During its opening weekend in 101 theater locations in New York City, the film earned $703,437 in box office sales, marking one of the highest opening weekends for a film released by Avco Embassy Pictures. In the United States, it earned $11,988,469. In its first three months in ten foreign territories, the film grossed a further $7 million. By the end of its theatrical run, it had grossed a worldwide total of $22 million.

=== Critical response ===
==== Contemporary ====
Charles Champlin of the Los Angeles Times deemed the film "a smooth and terrifically impressive technical achievement, a sort of jeu de spook with all manner of eerie and shocking special effects." In a mostly negative review, critic Roger Ebert described the film as "a labor of love, if not a terrifically skillful one" but admitted Phantasm had a good visual style and sense of pacing. Trevor Johnston of Time Out called the film "a surprisingly shambolic affair whose moments of genuine invention stand out amid the prevailing incompetence." Dave Kehr of the Chicago Reader described it as "spotty" and "effective here and there", though he praised Coscarelli's raw ability. Vincent Canby of The New York Times compared it to a ghost story told by a bright, imaginative eight-year-old; he concluded that it is "thoroughly silly and endearing". Variety gave it a positive review that highlighted the use of both horror and humor. Tim Pulleine (Monthly Film Bulletin) described the film as a "dilapidated z-movie" with "singularly unconvincing apparitions and contraptions" and that the film did not have "anything resembling a coherent plot in the course of all the fumblingly juvenile malarkey".

==== Retrospective ====
On the review aggregator website Rotten Tomatoes, 72% of 50 critics' reviews are positive. The website's consensus reads: "Phantasm: Remastered adds visual clarity to the first installment in one of horror's most enduring—and endearingly idiosyncratic—franchises." Metacritic, which uses a weighted average, assigned the film a score of 72 out of 100, based on ten critics, indicating "generally favorable" reviews.

Kim Newman of Empire called it "an incoherent but effective horror picture" that "deliberately makes no sense" and rates it four out of five stars. Scott Weinberg of Fearnet stated the acting is "indie-style raw" and special effects are sometimes poor, but the originality and boldness make up for it. Steve Barton of Dread Central gave the film a score of five out of five stars, calling it a masterpiece and "one hell of a scary film". Bloody Disgusting rated it four out of five stars, calling it "truly original" and writing that it "imbues in its viewers a profound sense of dread". Author John Kenneth Muir called the film striking, distinctive, and original. Muir stated that the film has become a classic, and that the Tall Man is a horror film icon.

Writing for PopMatters, Bill Gibron noted in 2008: "at its core, Phantasm was and remains a movie about the nature of dread. It’s an experiment in what makes us afraid. It uses any and all terror tenets—suspense, bloodletting, the unknown, the unstoppable—as gears in an ever-churning macabre machine. Perhaps the clearest indication of Coscarelli’s success remains the enigmatic villain he created, the iconic Tall Man. It’s rare when a movie can leave behind such a lasting impression. For Phantasm, this lumbering ghoul remains its legitimate legacy."

=== Accolades ===
| Institution | Year | Category | Recipient(s) | Result | Ref. |
|---|---|---|---|---|---|
| Avoriaz International Film Festival | 1979 | Special Jury Award | Don Coscarelli | Won | |
| Fangoria Chainsaw Awards | 1994 | Hall of Fame | Angus Scrimm | Inducted | |
| Saturn Awards | 1980 | Best Horror Film | Phantasm | Nominated | |
| Saturn Awards | 2017 | Best DVD or Blu-ray Special Edition Release | Phantasm: Remastered | Won | |

=== Legacy ===
Phantasm has become a cult film in the years since its original release. In his book 100 Greatest Cult Films, Christopher J. Olson writes that "Phantasm retains its power to unsettle viewers and leave them wondering what they just watched. Coscarelli's merciless but meticulous editing ensures that the events unfold in a disjointed and confusing manner. The film refuses to follow conventional logic and often feels like a terrifying fever dream projected on the screen."

Coscarelli attributes the film's cult following to nostalgia and its lack of clarification, as repeated viewings can leave fans with different interpretations. In 2007, USA Today praised the film for "the touching portrayal of two brothers in danger, an iconic villain in The Tall Man (Angus Scrimm) and a floating metallic sphere that's a death-dealing weapon." The film was rated #25 on the cable channel Bravo's list of The 100 Scariest Movie Moments. Time Out London placed it at #75 in their list of 100 Best Horror Films. Drive-in movie critic Joe Bob Briggs included it at #20 in his 25 Scariest DVDs Ever list. UGO placed the film at #7 out of 11 in its Top Terrifying Supernatural Moments.

In 2014, USA Today quoted Jovanka Vuckovic, editor-in-chief of Rue Morgue, as stating that Supernatural, A Nightmare on Elm Street (1984), and One Dark Night (1983) were all influenced by Phantasm. The Tall Man character has also been cited as an influence on the internet-based character Slender Man.

The Deadly Sphere solar eclipse event enemy in Terraria is a reference to the silver sphere.

== Sequels ==
The film was followed by four sequels: Phantasm II (1988), Phantasm III: Lord of the Dead (1994), Phantasm IV: Oblivion (1998) and Phantasm: Ravager (2016).

== Sources ==
- Baldassarre, Angela (1999). The Great Dictators: Interviews with Filmmakers of Italian Descent. Guernica Editions. p. 49. ISBN 978-1-550-71094-6.
- Coscarelli, Don (2018). True Indie: Life and Death in Filmmaking. New York City, New York: St. Martin's Press. ISBN 978-1-250-19324-7.
- Chess, Shira; Newsom, Eric (2014). Folklore, Horror Stories, and the Slender Man: The Development of an Internet Mythology. New York City, New York: Palgrave Macmillan US. ISBN 978-1-137-49113-8.
- Hennessey, Cristopher; McCarty, Michael (2005). "The Phantasm Man". More Giants of the Genre. Rockville, Maryland: Wildside Press. ISBN 978-7-770-04706-0.
- Hogan, David J. (2010). Dark Romance: Sexuality in the Horror Film. Jefferson, North Carolina: McFarland & Company. ISBN 978-0-786-46248-3.
- Muir, John Kenneth (2002). Horror Films of the 1970s. Jefferson, North Carolina: McFarland & Company. ISBN 978-0-786-49156-8.
- Newman, Kim (2011). Nightmare Movies. London, England: Bloomsbury Publishing. ISBN 978-1-408-81750-6.]
- Olson, Christopher J. (2018). 100 Greatest Cult Films. Lanham, Maryland: Rowman & Littlefield. ISBN 978-1-442-21104-9.
- Sigoloff, Marc (2000). The Films of the Seventies: A Filmography of American, British and Canadian Films 1970-1979. Jefferson, North Carolina: McFarland & Company. ISBN 978-0-786-40882-5.
