= A. Michael Baldwin =

American actor (born 1963)

- Born: Michael M. Baldwin; April 4, 1963 (age 63); Los Angeles, California, U.S.
- Occupations: Actor; producer; screenwriter
- Years active: 1976–2017

A. Michael Baldwin (born Michael M. Baldwin; April 4, 1963) is an American actor, producer, and screenwriter. He came to public notice as a child actor, appearing as Mike Pearson in Phantasm (1979) and its sequels.

== Biography ==
Baldwin was born in Los Angeles, California, the son of animator Gerard Baldwin, who worked on classic shows such as The Jetsons, Rocky and Bullwinkle, and George of the Jungle. Michael Baldwin began acting in his teens and was also a member of the Teenage Drama Workshop at California State University. He is best known for his roles as Mike in the Phantasm films (except for Phantasm II). Baldwin practices Eastern Mysticism, and in the 1980s, he temporarily left acting to explore his spirituality. Some of his latest accomplishments are writing, producing, and appearing in Vice Girls, and its sequel. He has also taught acting classes and workshops in Los Angeles. In May 2015 Baldwin was part of the Phantasm Reunion at Texas Frightmare Weekend. He currently lives in Austin, Texas, with his two children and fiancé.

== Personal life ==
In recent decades Baldwin has worked as an acting coach, and as of 2026 he resides in Austin, Texas, with his wife, Julia Boody.

== Filmography ==
Year	Title	Role	Notes
1976	Kenny & Company	Doug	
1979	Phantasm	Mike Pearson	
1994	Phantasm III: Lord of the Dead	Mike Pearson	
1996	Vice Girls	Tralaine	
1998	Phantasm IV: Oblivion	Mike Pearson	
2001	Virtual Girl 2: Virtual Vegas	Dr. Pierson	
2012	Brutal	Carl Gibson	
2013	It Came from the Dead	The Conjurer	Short film
2014	Welcome to the Dauntless Motel	Sheriff Westlake	Short film
2014	The Pick-Axe Murders Part III: The Final Chapter	Sheriff Matthews	
2016	Phantasm: Ravager	Mike Pearson	
2017	Flay	Billy Salcedo	
