= Tall Man (Phantasm) =

The Tall Man
- Phantasm character
- First appearance: Phantasm (1979)
- Last appearance: Phantasm: Ravager (2016)
- Created by: Don Coscarelli
- Portrayed by: Angus Scrimm

In-universe information
- Full name: Jebediah Morningside
- Nickname: Phantasm
- Species: Unknown
- Gender: Male
- Title: The Tall Man
- Occupation: Mortician
- Status: Unknown; Probably Deceased

The Tall Man (Jebediah Morningside) is a fictional character and the main antagonist of the Phantasm franchise. The Tall Man first appeared in the first Phantasm in 1979, and his most recent appearance in the film Phantasm: Ravager in 2016. In all of his film appearances, the Tall Man has been portrayed by Angus Scrimm.

== Creation and conception ==
According to Don Coscarelli (director of the first four Phantasm films), the idea was to create a horror film about a boy inside a funeral home because he thought the way Americans handled dead bodies was mysterious. Angus Scrimm was chosen to portray the main villain because when Coscarelli and Scrimm worked together in a previous film Jim the World's Greatest, Scrimm was able to frighten a child by just staring at him while raising one eyebrow (this action later becomes one of the Tall Man's most iconic behaviors).

Coscarelli also got the idea to feature flying spheres as Tall Man's minions. According to him, the idea came from his dream as a teen where he was being chased down corridors by a flying chrome ball. Later, when he wrote the Phantasm screenplay, he modified the spheres so they were able to drill and drain the blood from their victims.

== Fictional character biography ==
Originally, the Tall Man was a mild-mannered 19th-century mortician by the name of Jebediah Morningside. After years of performing funerals and burying the bodies of those who had died, he began to develop a fascination with any possible connection between our world and the world of the dead. Jebediah's research eventually led him to construct a machine that enabled him to travel through time and space. After going through the portal for the first time, travelling to a destination unknown, he promptly returned, irrevocably changed and henceforth known as the Tall Man.

== Characterization ==
The Tall Man appears as a tall and older white-haired man usually posing as a mortician. Subsequent to his transformation from Jebediah Morningside, he has only ever been seen to wear a tailored black suit, befitting his assumed profession. He seems to speak only rarely, preferring instead to rely on facial expressions, particularly the raising of one eyebrow, the latter of which in particular has become an icon of the character.

== Powers and weapons ==
The Tall Man has superhuman strength, and has been seen lifting a man or even an entire (occupied) coffin with only one arm and little effort. He has also been seen to possess telekinetic abilities, able to control both inanimate objects and people with only the use of his mind. Despite his mundane outward appearance, any parts of the Tall Man's body that are severed or otherwise amputated from the whole have been known to subsequently transform into hostile insect-like creatures, or to bleed a yellow colored substance (possibly his blood, but probably intended to represent embalming fluid.)

He also has the ability to shapeshift into other people including women in order to trick potential victims. The Tall Man routinely surrounds himself with various accomplices, ranging from apparently willing human aides to resurrected corpses and other demonic creatures. His main source of assistance comes in the form of corpses that he exhumes from the graveyards under his control; after digging up the cadavers, he crushes the body to the size of a dwarf, removes the brain and reanimates the body. Despite their diminutive stature, these dwarves (also known as "Lurkers") constitute the majority of the Tall Man's forces, alongside foes wearing gas masks (also known as "Gravers"). The Tall Man also utilizes flying metallic spheres (also known as "Sentinels") that conceal within them many offensive weapons, including blades, drills, lasers and circular saws. The spheres, which have come to be considered the Tall Man's signature weapons, contain (and are apparently controlled by) the shrunken brains removed from the Lurkers. Later, the Tall Man also utilizes some kind of alien virus. When a human is infected, the victim's head will explode and the virus will spread.

Though he has thus far been impossible to permanently kill, the Tall Man can be hurt. It has been shown on more than one occasion that he has an extreme aversion to cold; Mike Pearson, another main character in the Phantasm films, says that this might possibly be because the realm he comes from is very warm. He has also displayed a vulnerability to certain pitches of sound, which can temporarily immobilize him. On those occasions when his body has sustained mortal injury, an identical new Tall Man has immediately emerged from his portal, ready to continue on unfazed from where his predecessor left off.

== In popular culture ==
- The character Captain Phasma (Gwendoline Christie) from Star Wars series was named so because according to J. J. Abrams (director of The Force Awakens), the metallic appearance of Captain Phasma reminded him of the Tall Man's metallic spheres.
- The popular creepypasta character Slender Man is inspired by the Tall Man.
- A phantasm similar in design to the Tall Man is featured as the main antagonist of the 2017 Mike Tyson Mysteries episode "Mystery on Wall Street", voiced by Jeff Bergman.

== See also ==
- List of fictional demons
- List of horror film antagonists
- Undertaker
