= Don Coscarelli =

American screenwriter (born 1954)

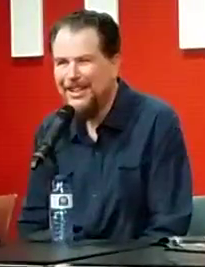
- Coscarelli at Nocturna Fest Madrid in 2017
- Born: February 17, 1954 (age 72); Tripoli, Libya
- Occupations: Film director Producer; Screenwriter
- Spouse: Shelley Kay
- Children: Chloe

Don Coscarelli Jr. (born February 17, 1954) is an American film director, producer, and screenwriter. He is best known for his work in horror films. His directing credits include the first four films in the Phantasm franchise, as well as The Beastmaster (1982) and Bubba Ho-Tep (2002).

== Biography ==
Coscarelli was born to Donald A. "Dac" Coscarelli Sr. (1928-2023) and Shirley Mae "Kate" Tyer (1927-1999) in Tripoli, Libya. His father was a West Point graduate, who later served in the US Air Force before becoming an investment manager. His mother Kate would become a successful novelist before her death due to ALS complications. After his father left the Air Force, the family relocated to Southern California. Although his parents were not connected with the motion picture business, he was fascinated with cameras and filmmaking at an early age. Long before he was old enough to attend film school, his short films, made with the help of neighborhood friends in his hometown of Los Alamitos, California, were winning prizes on television.

At the age of 19, Coscarelli became the youngest director to have a feature film distributed by a major studio when he sold his independently produced drama Jim the World's Greatest, to Universal Pictures. The film was the first collaboration for Coscarelli with actor Lawrence Rory Guy, who went on to achieve horror icon status under the screen name Angus Scrimm. Jim the World's Greatest was an official selection of the USA Film Festival.

Coscarelli is best known for Phantasm, and its sequels. The original film was a worldwide critical and box-office success and won the Special Jury Prize at the Festival du Cinema Fantastique at Avoriaz, France.

Coscarelli also co-wrote (with Paul Pepperman) and directed The Beastmaster, which was described by Entertainment Weekly as "a surefire audience favorite." The Beastmaster has spawned two sequels and a television series.

Coscarelli was the recipient of the Bram Stoker Award for Best Screenplay for his film Bubba Ho-Tep, which he also directed. Based on a short story by Joe R. Lansdale, it stars Bruce Campbell, Ossie Davis, and frequent Coscarelli collaborator Reggie Bannister. In addition to being a critical hit, Bubba Ho-Tep was also a festival favorite, playing prestigious international film festivals like the Toronto International Film Festival, SXSW, Florida Film Festival, Brussels International Festival of Fantasy Films, and the Hong Kong International Film festival. At HBO's US Comedy Arts Festival, Coscarelli was the recipient of the Best Screenplay Award. At Montreal's FantAsia Festival, Bubba Ho-Tep received the Best International Film award.

Coscarelli also directed the premiere episode of the American TV series Masters of Horror, titled "Incident On and Off a Mountain Road" and co-wrote the teleplay with Stephen Romano. In 2008, Coscarelli purchased film rights to the horror novel and internet series John Dies at the End by David Wong. The film was completed in 2011, and released in 2013.

In 2018, he published his memoir, True Indie: Life and Death in Filmmaking.

== Personal life ==
Coscarelli frequently collaborates with his wife, costume designer Shelley Kay. His daughter is award-winning vegan chef Chloe Coscarelli.

== Filmography ==
- Jim the World's Greatest (1976)
- Kenny & Company (1976)
- Phantasm (1979)
- The Beastmaster (1982)
- Phantasm II (1988)
- Survival Quest (1989)
- Phantasm III: Lord of the Dead (1994)
- Phantasm IV: Oblivion (1998)
- Bubba Ho-Tep (2002)
- Incident On and Off a Mountain Road (2005, TV, Masters of Horror series)
- John Dies at the End (2012)
- Phantasm: Ravager (2016) – producer and co-writer
- Applecart (2017) – executive producer

== Awards ==
	Awards
Phantasm (1979)	Special Prize at the Avoriaz Fantastic Film Festival
The Beastmaster (1982)	Antenne II Award at the Avoriaz Fantastic Film Festival
Phantasm III: Lord of the Dead (1994)	Chainsaw Award for Best Limited-Release/Direct-to-Video Film
Bubba Ho-Tep (2002)	Bram Stoker Awards for Best Screenplay, Nominated - Best Film at the Fantasporto
Don Coscarelli (2004)	Fangoria Horror Hall of Fame
John Dies at the End (2012)	Philadelphia Film Festival, Audience Award - Honorable Mention
