= Red Zone Cuba =

1966 film by Coleman Francis

- VHS release cover on the Anthony Cardoza Classics label
- Directed by: Coleman Francis
- Written by: Coleman Francis
- Produced by: Anthony Cardoza; Coleman Francis
- Starring: Coleman Francis; Anthony Cardoza; Harold Saunders; John Carradine; Lanell Cado; Tom Hanson; George Prince; Frederic Downs
- Cinematography: Herb Roberts
- Edited by: J.H. Russell
- Music by: John Bath; Ray Gregory (theme)
- Distributed by: Hollywood Star Pictures
- Release date: November 23, 1966
- Running time: 89 minutes
- Country: United States
- Language: English
- Budget: $30,000

Red Zone Cuba, also known as Night Train to Mundo Fine, is a 1966 American neo-noir art drama film directed by Coleman Francis, who also wrote and co-produced the film, and played the starring role. It follows the meandering adventures of an escaped convict and two ex-convicts he recruits along the way as they become involved in the 1961 Bay of Pigs Invasion, and a quest to find a hidden treasure in a tungsten mine.

In 1994, the film was brought out from obscurity when it was featured as an episode of the movie-mocking television series Mystery Science Theater 3000. Since then, it has been considered by many to be one of the worst movies ever made.

== Plot ==
In the film's opening sequence, young reporter Jim Benton asks train engineer Mr. Wilson about three men – Griffin, Cook and Landis – who hopped his freight train five years earlier, in 1961. "He ran all the way to hell," the engineer remarks about Griffin. The title sequence follows, and afterwards the film proper picks up, switching to 1961 for the duration. Griffin escapes from jail and runs into Cook and Landis. The three make their way to an airstrip run by Cherokee Jack who flies them to a military training facility, where they will be paid to take part in the Bay of Pigs Invasion.

Having been deceived about the money they were to receive, the three attempt to escape, but are recaptured and forced to invade Cuba. They are soon captured again, this time by the communist Cuban forces; a lengthy sequence of executions is ended when they escape again. They abandon their badly wounded superior officer, Bailey Chastain; although he begs them to take him along, they refuse because they cannot carry him during their escape. Desperately he informs them of his family's mine back home that contains pitchblende, tungsten, and other precious metals. The trio find an airstrip and steal a light aircraft to return to the U.S.

Back on American soil, the three engage in a variety of crimes to get to the home of Chastain's wife to help her mine the metals her husband had mentioned in Cuba. They throw café owner Cliff Weismeyer down a well and Griffin rapes his blind daughter, then they steal his car and escape; they also hop Mr. Wilson's train in Albuquerque, New Mexico. They then arrive in Arizona and meet Chastain's wife Ruby and head towards the mine, but the car runs out of oil. The law catches up with them along the way and police cars approach them; Griffin impulsively shoots Ruby and runs into the fields, while Landis and Cook are arrested. Chastain returns from Cuba alive and is reunited with his wife after she is rescued and escorted home by a policeman. Griffin dies in a shootout with the police who then collect his belongings (a penny and a bent cigarette), and a voice-over somberly intones that Griffin "ran all the way to hell... with a penny and a broken cigarette" as the film ends.

== Production ==
Red Zone Cuba was Francis's final film as director, and his only starring role; in the other two films he helmed, The Skydivers and The Beast of Yucca Flats, he limited his acting to cameos. Though John Carradine receives fourth billing in the credits, and was prominently featured in the advertising and promotional material for the film, he only appears briefly, during a framing sequence at the beginning of the film. Carradine also sings the film's opening theme song, "Night Train to Mundo Fine" (pronounced "Finé"), with musical accompaniment by Ray Gregory and the Melmen.

== Cast ==
- Coleman Francis as Griffin / Narrator
- Anthony Cardoza as Landis / Fidel Castro
- Harold Saunders as Cook
- John Carradine as Mr. Wilson
- John Morrison as Joe
- George Prince as Cherokee Jack
- Tom Hanson as Bailey Chastain
- Lanell Cado as Ruby Chastain
- Charles F. Harter as Cliff Weismeyer
- Julian Baker as Sheriff
- Elaine Gifford as Cliff Weismeyer's Daughter
- Frederic Downs as Tinsley
- James H. Russell as Kelly
- John Cruz as Juan Cruz/Cuban Prison Guard
- Nick Raymond as 1st Highway Patrolman
- Bruce Love as Jim Benton
- Nick Wolcuff as 2nd Highway Patrolman

== Reception and legacy ==
A review of the film for AllMovie described it as "a low-budget, catastrophic version of the Bay of Pigs story," and that "winning the lottery offers greater odds than finding anything historical – or even sensical – in this film." Another review of the film in TV Guide reported that it was a "cheap thriller" with a "reported budget of only $30,000, and looking its cost," and noted "One highlight: John Carradine sings the title song."

=== Appearance on Mystery Science Theater 3000 ===
On December 17, 1994, Red Zone Cuba was featured as the subject of an episode of Mystery Science Theater 3000 (MST3K). It was the second of Coleman Francis's films to be featured in the show's sixth season, following The Skydivers and preceding The Beast of Yucca Flats. MST3K star Kevin Murphy cited Red Zone Cuba as his "most hated" film of all he watched during his time on the show. The film was preceded by the short Speech: Platform Posture and Appearance, an educational film about public speaking. The MST3K episode was released on DVD by Rhino Home Video on March 26, 2002, and again on August 16, 2011, by Shout Factory.
