= Final Curtain (film) =

- Written by: Ed Wood
- Directed by: Ed Wood
- Starring: Duke Moore; Dudley Manlove; Jenny Stevens
- Country of origin: United States
- No. of episodes: 1

Production
- Producers: Ed Wood; Anthony Cardoza; Tom Mason
- Running time: 22 minutes

Original release
- Release: 1957

Final Curtain was a 22-minute television pilot written and directed by Ed Wood in 1957. It starred Duke Moore as an actor wandering an empty theater after dark, where he is haunted by creepy sounds and eerie sights. The film is narrated by Dudley Manlove. Both Moore and Manlove also appear in Wood's cult film Plan 9 from Outer Space. Wood had hoped to use the film as the pilot for a television series he intended to produce called Portraits of Terror.

Some scenes where the actor explores the theater were later inserted into Wood's 1959 film, Night of the Ghouls, with a voiceover narration designed to make it fit the story better.

For years, the complete version of Final Curtain was considered a lost film, until a copy was discovered by Jason Insalaco, great-nephew of actor Paul Marco (who had appeared in several Ed Wood projects). The restored film was premiered at the Slamdance Film Festival on January 23, 2012 and is now available on DVD.
