= Coleman Francis =

American actor (1919–1973)

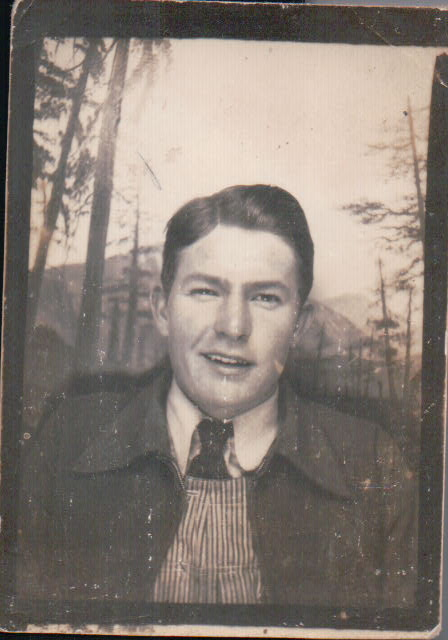
- Francis in 1937
- Born: Coleman Chambers Francis; January 24, 1919; Greer County, Oklahoma, U.S.
- Died: January 15, 1973 (aged 53); Hollywood, California, U.S.
- Resting place: Westwood Village Memorial Park Cemetery
- Other name: Coley
- Years active: 1948–1973
- Spouse: Barbara Francis
- Children: 2

Coleman Chambers Francis (January 24, 1919 – January 15, 1973) was an American actor, writer, producer and director. He was best known for his film trilogy consisting of The Beast of Yucca Flats (1961), The Skydivers (1963) and Red Zone Cuba (1966), all three of which were filmed in the general vicinity of Santa Clarita, California.

== Early life ==
Francis was born in Greer County, Oklahoma, in 1919. He was the son of William F. Francis and Scytha Estes. During the Great Depression, he moved to Texas.

== Career ==
In 1940, Francis headed for Hollywood to start an acting career. His plans were initially interrupted by the Second World War, during which he served in the medical detachment of the 49th Field Artillery Battalion, 7th Infantry Division. He played minor parts in several films from the late 1940s to early 1970s, often without credit, including Blondie's Reward (1948), Scarlet Angel (1952), The Girl in White (1952), She Couldn't Say No (1954), This Island Earth (1955), Twilight for the Gods (1958), Motorpsycho (1965) and P.J. (1968). 1958 brought his first credited role, Stakeout on Dope Street, where he played a detective.

During March 1958, Francis portrayed Matthew Harrison Brady opposite Sidney Blackmer as Henry Drummond in Inherit the Wind at the Sombrero Playhouse in Phoenix, Arizona.

In 1959, Francis formed a partnership with Anthony "Tony" Cardoza, a welder by trade, and together they created three films: The Beast of Yucca Flats (1961), The Skydivers (1963) and Night Train to Mundo Fine, aka Red Zone Cuba (1966). Francis wrote and directed the films, while Cardoza handled production duties.

Toward the end of his life, Francis had a small role in Ray Dennis Steckler's 1969 movie Body Fever. His last work in the film industry was in 1970, when he played a drunk in Russ Meyer's Beyond the Valley of the Dolls.

== Personal life ==
Francis married Barbara Francis, and while the two had divorced prior to the filming of The Beast of Yucca Flats, she was cast as Lois Radcliffe in Beast and appeared as the wife of a spectator (played by Coleman) in its follow-up, The Skydivers. They had two sons, Alan and Ronald, who appeared as Art and Randy Radcliffe in The Beast of Yucca Flats and the spectator's sons in The Skydivers.

== Death ==
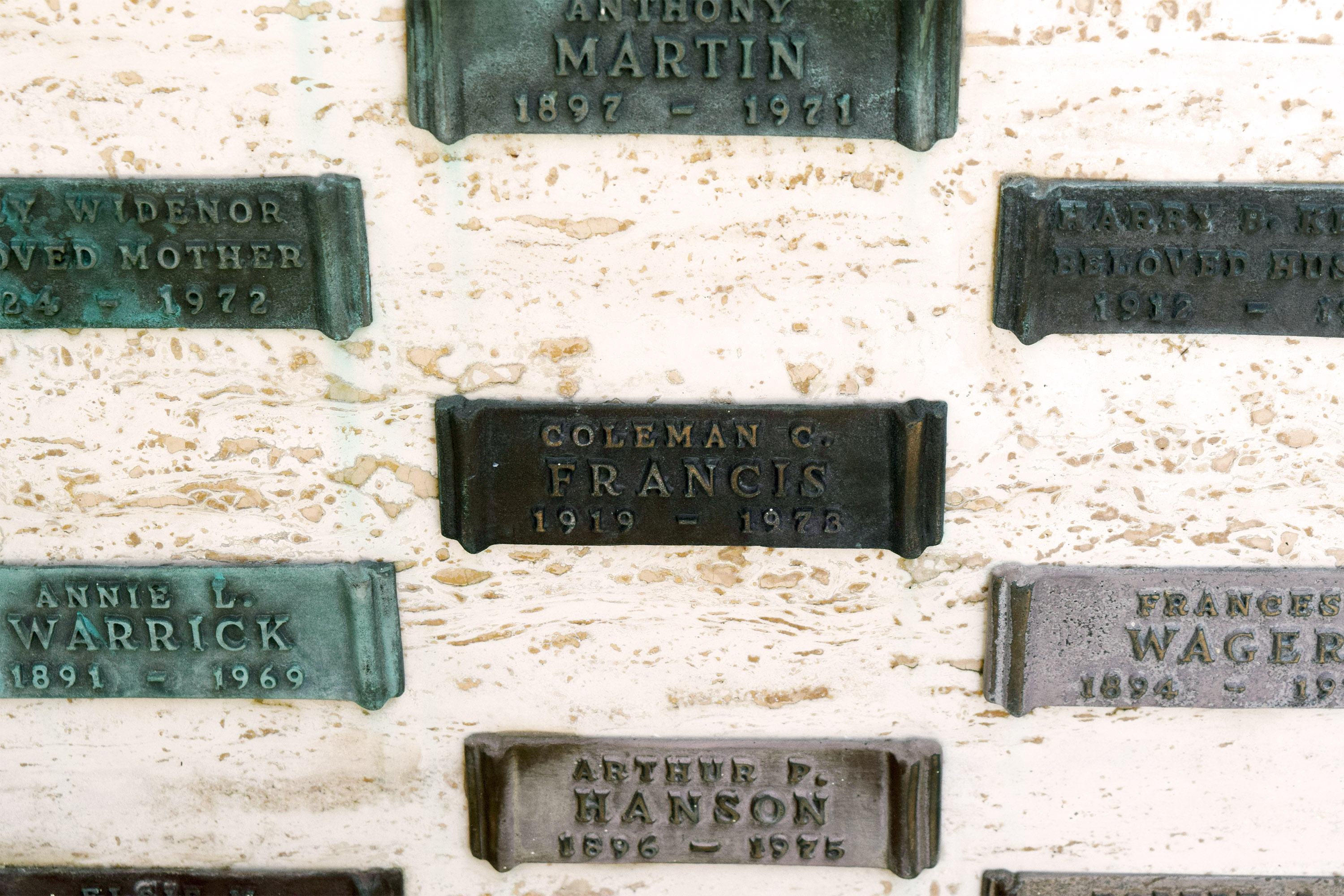
Plaque at interment site for actor and director Coleman Francis, Los Angeles, California, US

Francis died in California on January 15, 1973, only nine days before he would have turned 54. Though arteriosclerosis is listed as the official cause of death, Cardoza says Francis' body was found in the back of a station wagon at the Vine Street Ranch Market with "a plastic bag over his head and a tube going into his mouth or around his throat". Francis is interred at the Columbarium of Remembrance in the Westwood Village Memorial Park Cemetery in Los Angeles.

== Legacy ==
After fading into obscurity for decades, Francis' three directed films gained cult status after being featured on the TV show Mystery Science Theater 3000 in the mid-1990s, where they became infamous for their poor production values, repetitive plot devices, meandering and incomprehensible storylines, and stilted acting. Jim Vorel of Paste magazine characterized Francis as being the worst director of all-time, even suggesting that he may surpass Ed Wood in terms of ineptitude. Hallmarks of Francis' films include preoccupation with light aircraft and parachuting, coffee or cigarettes serving as props or centers of conversation and vigilante-style gunning down of suspects without trial at the films' conclusions.

Coleman Francis uses edits like blunt instruments. He uses blunt instruments like blunt instruments. His major themes are death, hatefulness, death, pain, and death. He looks like Curly Howard possessed by demons from Hell. He tried to pass off Lake Mead as the Caribbean Sea. His films have the moral compass of David Berkowitz.

— Kevin Murphy; Mystery Science Theater 3000

== Filmography ==
=== Actor (films) ===
- Blondie's Reward (uncredited, 1948)
- The Girl in White (1952)
- Scarlet Angel (uncredited, 1952)
- Killers from Space (uncredited, 1954)
- She Couldn't Say No (uncredited, 1954)
- This Island Earth (uncredited, 1955)
- The Phantom Stagecoach (uncredited, 1957)
- Stakeout on Dope Street (1958)
- Twilight for the Gods (uncredited, 1958)
- T-Bird Gang (1959)
- The Jailbreakers (1960)
- Spring Affair (1960)
- Cimarron (uncredited, 1960)
- The Beast of Yucca Flats (uncredited, 1961)
- The Skydivers (uncredited, 1963)
- The Thrill Killers (uncredited, 1964)
- Lemon Grove Kids Meet the Monsters (1965)
- Motorpsycho (1965)
- Red Zone Cuba (1966)
- The Last American Hobo (1967)
- P.J. (uncredited, 1968)
- Body Fever (1969)
- The Dirtiest Game (1970)
- Beyond the Valley of the Dolls (1970)

=== Actor (television) ===
- Sergeant Preston of the Yukon (4 episodes, 1955–1957)
- Highway Patrol (1 episode, 1959)
- Dragnet (3 episodes, 1957–1959)
- M Squad (1 episode, 1960)
- Tales of Wells Fargo (1 episode, 1961)

=== Director ===
- The Beast of Yucca Flats (1961)
- The Skydivers (1963)
- Red Zone Cuba (1966)

== See also ==
- List of films considered the worst
- RiffTrax
- MST3K
