= Anthony Cardoza =

American actor and film producer

- Born: May 26, 1930; Hartford, Connecticut, United States
- Died: December 7, 2015 (aged 85); California, U.S.
- Occupations: Actor, film producer
- Years active: 1959–1996
- Spouse: Joy Wilkerson (1 child)

Anthony "Tony" Cardoza (May 26, 1930 – December 7, 2015) was an American actor and film producer. A number of the B-movies that he produced are considered to be among the all-time worst, and were immortalized through Mystery Science Theater 3000.

== Early years ==
Cardoza was born in Hartford, Connecticut.

== Military service ==
Before becoming involved in the film industry, Cardoza was a staff sergeant in the U.S. Army 3rd infantry division, being a sergeant gunner on the 105 mm Howitzer in the Korean War. He was awarded two Bronze Battle Stars, the Good Conduct Medal, Korean War Medal, Sharp Shooters medal, Presidents Medal, the Syngman Rhee Presidential Medal, the Asian War Medal, and others. Just prior to an honorable discharge, Cardoza was assigned to escort deceased soldiers to their loved ones.

== Manufacturing career ==
After his discharge from the army, Cardoza worked for Pratt & Whitney Aircraft in East Hartford, Connecticut, as a Heliarc welder on J-57 Jet engines, a trade he continued making a living from for a number of years into his show business career. However, in 1963, a doctor advised him to stop welding because of chalazion forming under his eyelids.

== Film career ==
Cardoza worked on over a dozen films, but is perhaps best known for his three collaborations with Coleman Francis in the 1960s: The Beast of Yucca Flats, The Skydivers, and Red Zone Cuba.

Cardoza's work would be remembered in the 1990s television series Mystery Science Theater 3000, as four of his five films would be lampooned – his three collaborations with Coleman Francis, and The Hellcats.

== Personal life ==
Cardoza was married to Joy Wilkerson, an experienced auto racing driver. They had a daughter, Kim.

== Death ==
Cardoza died December 7, 2015, as a result of complications from a stroke.

== Selected filmography ==
- Final Curtain
- Night of the Ghouls
- The Beast of Yucca Flats
- The Skydivers
- Red Zone Cuba
- The Hellcats
- Bigfoot
- Outlaw Riders
- Smokey and the Hotwire Gang
- Inside Out Upside Down
- Crime of Crimes
- Raw Force
- Heated Vengeance
- Misfit Patrol

=== Television ===
- The Joy Wilkerson TV Talk Variety Show – 46 episodes writer/producer/director (1974–1975)
