= The Beast of Yucca Flats =

1961 film by Coleman Francis

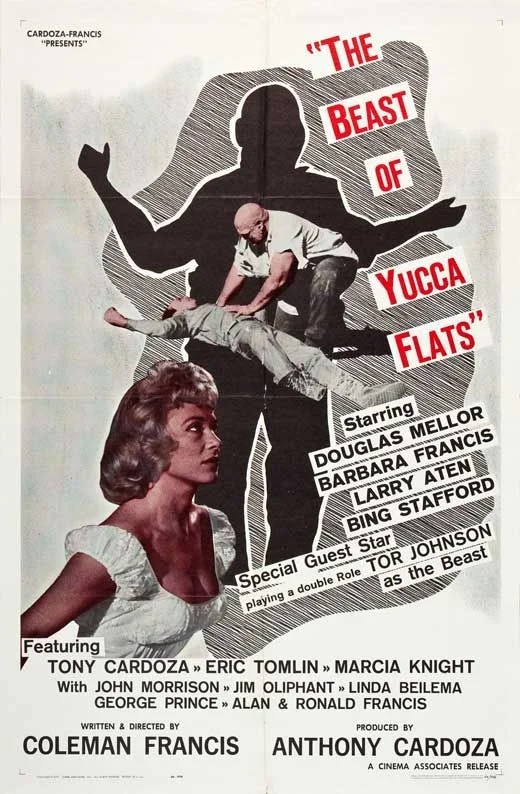
- Theatrical release poster
- Directed by: Coleman Francis
- Written by: Coleman Francis
- Produced by: Anthony Cardoza; Coleman Francis; Roland Morin; Jim Oliphant; Larry Aten; Bing Stafford
- Starring: Tor Johnson; Douglas Mellor; Barbara Francis; Bing Stafford; Conrad Brooks
- Cinematography: John Cagle; Lee Strosnider
- Edited by: Coleman Francis; Austin McKinney; Lee Strosnider; Anthony Cardoza
- Music by: Gene Kauer; Irwin Nafshun; Al Remington
- Distributed by: Cinema Associates
- Release date: May 2, 1961
- Running time: 54 minutes
- Country: United States
- Language: English
- Budget: $34,000 (est.)

The Beast of Yucca Flats (released to television as Atomic Monster: The Beast of Yucca Flats) is a 1961 American B-movie horror film written and directed by Coleman Francis. It was produced by Anthony Cardoza, Roland Morin, and Jim Oliphant.

The film stars Swedish former wrestler Tor Johnson (in his final film role) as the titular "Beast". It also stars Anthony Cardoza, Coleman Francis, and Jim Oliphant in bit parts, as well as Conrad Brooks in a minor role. Director Francis cast his two sons (Ronald and Alan Francis) in the film as the two lost boys.

The plot concerns a Soviet scientist named Joseph Jaworsky (Tor Johnson), who defects and flees to a Nevada Test Site called Yucca Flats, only to be turned into a mindless monster by atomic radiation, stalking the desert. The film has very little dialogue and most of the speech is omniscient narration.

== Plot ==
In Yucca Flats, Nevada, Soviet scientist Joseph Javorsky has defected from the USSR and arrives in America with a briefcase carrying various military secrets, including information on the Soviet Moon landing. Javorsky and his American contacts are suddenly attacked by a pair of KGB assassins, who kill Javorsky's associates and bodyguards. Javorsky flees into the desert, and after walking a great distance, decides to discard much of his clothing due to the searing heat. Presently, the radiation from a nearby nuclear weapons test transforms the bewildered Russian into a mindless beast with an uncontrollable urge to kill. He proceeds to murder a couple in their car on a nearby road, prompting police officers Jim Archer and Joe Dobson to pursue him.

Meanwhile, a vacationing family ventures along the same road. After stopping at a service station, the family's two young sons wander off into the surrounding desert, where they eventually encounter and escape from the mutated Javorsky. Their father searches for them but is mistaken for the killer by one of the police officers, who is searching for their suspect from the air in a light aircraft. The officer opens fire with a high-powered rifle on the innocent man, who manages to escape.

Eventually the family is reunited, and the police shoot and mortally wound Javorsky. Dying and with little strength left, he caresses a nearby curious jackrabbit before succumbing to his wounds.

== Cast ==
- Tor Johnson as Joseph Javorsky / The Beast
- Bing Stafford as Jim Archer
- Larry Aten as Joe Dobson
- Douglas Mellor as Hank Radcliffe
- Barbara Francis as Lois Radcliffe
- Ronald Francis as Randy Radcliffe
- Alan Francis as Art Radcliffe
- Jim Oliphant as vacationing husband
- Linda Bielema as vacationing wife
- Anthony Cardoza as KGB driver / helpful neighbor
- Bob Labansat as Javorsky's bodyguard
- John Morrison as KGB passenger
- Jim Miles as Javorsky's driver
- Eric Tomlin as motorist run off road
- George Prince as man who reports murder
- Conrad Brooks as man at airfield
- Graham Stafford as news boy
- Lanell Cado as strangled woman
- Coleman Francis as gas station attendant / newspaper patron
- Marcia Knight as Jim Archer's woman
- Joseph Luis Rubin as police officer

== Production ==
The setting for the film, "Yucca Flats", was based on the real-life Yucca Flat, which has been called "the most irradiated, nuclear-blasted spot on the face of the earth." In 1970, nine years after the film was made, 86 workers were exposed to radiation during the Yucca Flat Baneberry Test. In March 2009, Time identified the accident as one of the world's worst nuclear disasters. Actual shooting locations for the film were all in California: Santa Clarita (desert scenes), Saugus (airplane scenes), and Van Nuys (opening scene interior).

The movie was filmed without a soundtrack. Narration, voice-overs, and some sound effects were added in post-production. To avoid having to synchronize the audio to the picture, characters speak only when their faces are either off-screen or not clearly visible due to darkness or distance. Likewise, during scenes in which firearms are used, the muzzles of the guns are usually out of frame when the weapons are fired. During scenes of gunplay, many characters appear at first to have suffered life-threatening bullet wounds, only to appear in later scenes fully recovered with no visible signs of having been wounded. Extensive narration is used in lieu of plot points being conveyed through dialogue. Film historian Bill Warren stated, "The AFI catalog says [the film] may have been reissued in 1964 as Girl Madness."

According to producer Anthony Cardoza, the film's closing scene in which Johnson's character, expressing a final bit of humanity, embraces a jackrabbit, was not planned; a wild rabbit entered the field of view while the camera was rolling, and Johnson improvised.

The film's total budget was estimated at $34,000.

=== Opening murder scene ===
The first scene in the film is the strangulation murder of a woman (played by Lanell Cado) who has just stepped out of the shower, by a man whose face is never shown; it is implied that the killer raped her corpse. The murderer is dressed like Javorsky after his transformation, but the murder is never mentioned during the actual film, nor is there any apparent time and/or place in the film where it could be said to occur. According to an interview with producer Cardoza by film historian Tom Weaver, the scene was added after the film was complete because director Francis liked nude scenes. Some prints (such as the one used for the Mystery Science Theater 3000 episode) were edited to show the woman clothed for the duration of the scene (running 81 seconds), with the only nudity being a brief flash of the breast as she towels herself in front of a mirror. The prints used for the 2000 Wade Williams DVD and the 2003 Alpha Video DVD have a slightly longer version of the scene (running 98 seconds), where the woman is shown naked as she puts on a pair of underwear, with both breasts visible several times before she is shown walking out of the room.

== Reception ==
The Beast of Yucca Flats was universally panned by critics upon its release, with many considering it one of the worst films ever made. Author and film critic Leonard Maltin awarded the film one star, or "BOMB", calling it "one of the worst films ever made." In his review, Maltin criticized the overuse of voice-over narration, and an opening sequence unrelated to the main story. Bruce Eder from AllMovie panned the film, criticizing the film's "pretentious and obtuse narration" and further stating, "The most enjoyable aspect of this movie is its remarkably short running time." VideoHound's Golden Movie Retriever awarded the film their lowest rating, calling it "A really cheap, quasi-nuclear protest film." On his website Fantastic Movie Musings and Ramblings, Dave Sindelar panned the film's "maddening" voice-over narration, editing, and apparent lack of a substantial storyline. TV Guide awarded the film 1.5 out of 4 stars, writing, "In an honest attempt to make a brief protest picture, the producers apparently didn't have enough money to accord this any sort of production value."

== Home media ==
The Beast of Yucca Flats was first released on DVD by Image Entertainment on September 5, 2000, as part of the "Wade Williams Collection", followed by numerous later DVD releases:

- It was released by Alpha Video on November 18, 2003, and by Image Entertainment on December 30, 2003, as a part of a double feature with Mesa of Lost Women (1953).
- It was released as a part of a 12-disc "Horror Classics Collection" by Digital 1 Stop on January 20, 2004.
- Platinum Disc released the film on June 7, 2005 and again on August 23 as part of several multi-disc collections.
- Mill Creek Entertainment released the film on July 5, 2005.
- In 2006, it was released by Digiview Entertainment and ST Clair Vision on May 9 and October 17, respectively.
- ST Clair Vision re-released it on June 26, 2007.
- Releases by Direct Source and Mill Creek Entertainment, as part of multi-film collections, also appeared in 2007.
- ST Clair Vision re-released the film one more time on May 20, 2008.
- In 2010, The Beast of Yucca Flats was released three separate times by TNT Media Group and Echo Bridge Home Entertainment.
- On August 20, 2013, Mill Creek released it as part of a 3-disc, 12-film collection "The Best of the Worst Film Pack".
- The film was last released by Echo Bridge on September 1, 2015.

== Legacy ==
Some critics have characterized the film as one of the worst science fiction horror films ever made, and one of the all-time worst films of any kind, even suggesting that it may be worse than Ed Wood's notoriously bad Plan 9 from Outer Space. In 1995, the television comedy series Mystery Science Theater 3000 featured The Beast of Yucca Flats in episode #621, helping the film develop a cult status.

== See also ==
- List of American films of 1961
- List of films considered the worst

== Sources ==
- Bogue, Mike (July 20, 2017). Apocalypse Then: American and Japanese Atomic Cinema, 1951–1967. McFarland. ISBN 978-1-4766-6841-3.
- Warren, Bill (January 12, 2017). Keep Watching the Skies!: American Science Fiction Movies of the Fifties, The 21st Century Edition. McFarland. ISBN 978-1-4766-2505-8.
- Willis, Donald C. (1984). Horror and Science Fiction Films III. Scarecrow Press. ISBN 978-0-8108-1723-4.
