= Night of the Ghouls =

1984 film by Ed Wood

- DVD cover
- Directed by: Ed Wood
- Written by: Ed Wood
- Produced by: Ed Wood; Tom Mason; Anthony Cardoza
- Starring: Kenne Duncan; Duke Moore; Tor Johnson; Valda Hansen; Paul Marco; Criswell
- Cinematography: William C. Thompson
- Edited by: Ed Wood
- Color process: Black and white
- Release date: 1984
- Running time: 69 minutes
- Country: United States
- Language: English

Night of the Ghouls

Night of the Ghouls is an American horror film written and directed by Ed Wood, and shot between April and May 1958. The film features some reoccurring cast members and characters from the 1955 Wood-directed film Bride of the Monster, including Tor Johnson reprising his role of Lobo and Paul Marco again playing the character of Kelton the cop, while the Amazing Criswell plays himself in the film's frame story. Another returning character is Police Captain Robbins of Homicide, although the character was played by Harvey B. Dunn in Bride of the Monster, and by Johnny Carpenter in Night of the Ghouls.

Following a preview screening held in 1959 at the Vista Theatre in Los Angeles, Wood felt that Night of the Ghouls required further editing. Correspondence between Wood and associate producer Anthony Cardoza indicates that Wood had plans to re-edit Night of the Ghouls, but was unable to do so because of unpaid bills owed to the film laboratory that developed the film. In the 1980s, Kansas City film hobbyist-entrepreneur and Wood fan Wade Williams located the film, paid the overdue bills to the lab, and claimed full ownership of it, releasing the film on VHS in 1984.

== Plot ==
At the beginning, Criswell rises from a coffin and narrates the events of the film. Then a montage starts showing juvenile delinquency, street fighting, and driving under the influence. The sequence ends with the bloody corpse of the drunk driver staring blankly at the camera. According to Criswell's narration, this is a rather typical end to "a drunken holiday weekend".

The film then cuts to a teenaged couple kissing in a convertible. When the boy gets too demanding, the girl slaps him and exits the car. The Black Ghost, an undead creature that lurks in the woods near them, later kills the young couple. The murders receive press attention but are thought to be the work of a maniac.

In a police station of East Los Angeles, California, Inspector Robbins waits for Detective Bradford at his office. Bradford soon arrives, dressed in a formal evening wear. He was called to work while on his way to the opera, and he protests the idea of working an unexpected assignment. But Robbins informs him that the case involves the "old house on Willows lake", which played a part in an earlier case investigated by Bradford. The house was destroyed by lightning, but someone rebuilt it. A flashback scene establishes that the elderly Edwards couple had a terrifying encounter with the White Ghost by this house. Having heard the story, Bradford accepts the assignment to investigate the old house. Robbins assigns Kelton to escort the Detective. Kelton has previously dealt with the supernatural in the events depicted in Bride of the Monster and Plan 9 from Outer Space.

Bradford drives to the house and enters through an open door, to be confronted by Dr. Acula, who is dressed in a turban and cryptically mentions that there are many already in the house, both living and dead. Bradford convinces Acula that he is just another prospective client, so his entrance is accepted. One of "the many" in the house is a remnant of its past, Lobo. A character from Bride of the Monster, Lobo is depicted as disfigured from the flames which once destroyed this house. Outside the house, Kelton arrives late and has brief encounters with both the Black Ghost and the White Ghost. Meanwhile, at a séance, Acula and his clients share the table with human skeletons. Dr. Acula turns out to be a fake psychic by the name of "Karl", as Bradford suspected earlier, and reveals that the White Ghost is an actress named Sheila. Her role is to scare away intruders. She is concerned by the presence of the Black Ghost which is not part of their hoax, though the cynical Acula dismisses her fears — he does not believe in the supernatural.

Both Bradford and Kelton have strange and sometimes violent confrontations within the house, and are eventually joined by reinforcements. As their accomplices fall to the police, Karl and Sheila attempt to escape through a mortuary room. There they are confronted by a group of undead men. Among them is Criswell, who is the only one that can speak, who explains to Karl that the supposedly "fake" psychic does have genuine powers and his necromantic efforts actually work. These dead men were restored to life, if only for a few hours, but they intend to take Karl with them in their return to the grave. As Karl dies, Sheila escapes the house to meet her own fate. The Black Ghost, genuinely undead, takes control of the impostor and tells her that it is time to join "the others" at the grave. As the police try to understand what happened to the deceased Karl, we see an undead Sheila, now truly a White Ghost.

In a brief epilogue, the narrator returns to his coffin. Claiming that it is time for both the old dead and the new to return to their graves, he reminds the viewer that they too can soon join them in death.

== Cast ==
- Kenne Duncan as Dr. Karl Acula
- Duke Moore as Lt. Dan Bradford (as 'Duke' Moore)
- Tor Johnson as Lobo (reprising role from Bride of the Monster)
- Valda Hansen as Sheila, the White Ghost
- Johnny Carpenter as Capt. Robbins (as John Carpenter) (the character played by Harvey B. Dunn in Bride of the Monster)
- Paul Marco as Patrolman Kelton (reprising his role from both Bride of the Monster and Plan 9 from Outer Space)
- Don Nagel as Sgt. Crandall
- Bud Osborne as Mr. Darmoor
- Jeannie Stevens as The Black Ghost/Mannequin
- Harvey B. Dunn as Henry Edwards (Dunn played Captain Robbins in Bride of the Monster)
- Margaret Mason (Tom Mason's real-life wife) as Martha Edwards
- Criswell as himself
- Tom Mason as undead man in coffin
- Ed Wood and Conrad Brooks as men in fight sequence (footage from Wood's unfinished Hellborn)

== Production and analysis ==
Rob Craig suggests that the film could be in part based on an earlier work, Sucker Money (1933), produced by Willis Kent. The two films have significant similarities in concept. In the earlier film, Swami Yomurda (Mischa Auer) and his minions stage an elaborate scheme to extort money from gullible victims. Yomurda and his group use technological means to convince their victims that they are receiving audiovisual from the otherworld. Craig himself, however, notes that Night of the Ghouls cannot be conceived as a straightforward remake, since Wood used the same template to tell a quite different story from the 1930s melodrama.

There are also notable similarities of this film with one of its contemporaries, The Unearthly (1957) by Boris Petroff. In both films the characters gather at an isolated location far from the city, a charismatic deceiver exploits other humans for his own purposes, promising them extraordinary services, undercover agents of the law manage to expose the conspiracies, and the villains meet their fates at the hands of someone they previously exploited. Tor Johnson also plays a character called "Lobo" in both films, and both of the Lobo characters are monstrous manservants working for the main villains. Both films were shot around the same time, though it is unclear if one was intentionally modeled after the other.

The notion of a genuine ghost and a fake one that are active on the same area is not unique to this film. The Ghost Breakers (1940) has a real ghost appear in the end, Spook Chasers (1957) has a real ghost among several fakes, and Ghost of Dragstrip Hollow (1959) has a real ghost residing in a "fake" haunted house.

Craig considers the film to have elements common in absurdist fiction, and also to have much of the pessimism and nihilism of a typical Samuel Beckett play. The opening montage of violence and the death of the drunk driver serve to underscore both the randomness and the lack of meaning of human life and death. The fates of Karl and Sheila are clearly meant to serve as a form of poetic justice, and the finale can also be seen as a triumph of Death over the mortals trying to exploit it. The final words of Criswell also serve to remind viewers of the truth, that everyone dies and that Death is destined to triumph over Life. Craig finds the film to be Wood's version of a requiem.

The film makes extensive use of static two shot, which David Hogan considered to have contributed to making this an "atypically boring" film by Wood. The film's main setting is the rebuilt house on Willows Lake that burned down in Bride of the Monster. There are frequent references to the mad scientist (Bela Lugosi) and Lobo (Tor Johnson), the latter of whom returns, his face now half-destroyed from the fire. The narrative notion that the house by Willow Lake is a recently reconstructed building is contradicted by the actual appearance of the house, which seems to be old and in disrepair. Craig suggests that the house would not look out of place in a Hooverville.

The formal-wearing police investigator seems a rather anachronistic figure, more reminiscent of a figure from a gothic fiction work or a costume drama. Valda Hansen, who plays the White Ghost, was seen as Wood's ingenue. She had reportedly impressed him with her vivacity and allure. David Hogan considered the spookiest scenes to be the ones featuring either Hansen or Jeannie Stevens, playing the film's ghostly femmes fatales.

Wood, his face hidden by a dark veil, doubled for the Black Ghost in several shots. According to actor Paul Marco, Wood could not get Jeannie Stevens to film these scenes. So he wore the costume and acted as her stand-in. Also, a publicity photo of Wood is seen on a wanted poster on the wall of the police station.

Tom Mason, who doubled for Bela Lugosi in Plan 9 From Outer Space appeared in Night of the Ghouls as one of the undead, while his wife Margaret Mason played the role of "Martha" (the woman in the car frightened by the White Ghost). In 1992, Margaret Mason was one of the people interviewed for the Ed Wood documentary Flying Saucers Over Hollywood: The Plan Nine Companion.

The séances featured in the film have some atypical elements. Skulls are set on the séance table and skeletons are sitting around it. The sound effects and floating trumpet would not be out of place in a 19th-century séance, though the electronically altered voice of the deceased is a far more modern element.

Night of the Ghouls is the third part of what Wood aficionados refer to as "The Kelton Trilogy", a trio of films featuring Paul Marco as "Officer Kelton", a whining, reluctant policeman. The other two films were Bride of the Monster and Plan 9 from Outer Space. Although said to be a sequel to Bride of the Monster, Night of the Ghouls featured only two characters from that film (Kelton and Lobo), and, in a retcon, it is claimed that Lt. Bradford had worked on the earlier case when he in fact did not appear in Bride of the Monster. His exploration of Dr. Acula's house was borrowed from Wood's short film Final Curtain and voice-over narration was added to integrate it into the story. As a result, there was no room for Harvey B. Dunn, who played Captain Tom Robbins in Bride of the Monster, to reprise his earlier role. Instead, he was given a small supporting role as a frightened motorist who encounters one of the "ghouls". Wood must have written the screenplay for Night of the Ghouls before 1956, as he originally planned to star Bela Lugosi in it.

== Release ==
Night of the Ghouls was originally to be called Revenge of the Dead. A December 1958 article about cast member Valda Hansen described the film as being "soon to be released". A contemporary article in Famous Monsters of Filmland referred to the soon-to-be-released film as Night of the Ghouls. Paul Marco recalled in an interview that the film had a preview screening in 1959 at the Vista Theatre in Los Angeles, California. He said that after watching it on the big screen, Wood felt it needed further editing. A 1959 letter from Wood to Anthony Cardoza, the film's associate producer, records some of Wood's plans to re-edit Night of the Ghouls, including removing some of Criswell's scenes and replacing them with some Bela Lugosi archive footage, as well as a possible title change. Wood, however, was never able to make the changes, because he was unable to pay the bills owed to the film laboratory that developed the film, resulting in the ownership of the film belonging to the lab.

Years later, Kansas City film hobbyist-entrepreneur and Ed Wood fan Wade Williams managed to locate the film, paid the long overdue bills to the lab, and claimed full ownership of it. He also gave it its first home video release on VHS in 1984. This was the film's world premiere.

== Critical reception ==
Writing in AllMovie, critic Bruce Eder reported that the film has "the strangeness, in the dialogue and characterizations, that one expects from one of Wood's movies," that "the edges of Wood's budget show more than ever, both onscreen and even in the music," and that it "isn't nearly as diverting [as] Plan 9 From Outer Space." Film critic Glenn Erickson wrote in DVD Talk, "Of course it's terrible," that "the acting is bad," and that compared to other films by Wood, "it's fairly coherent but more than a little boring, populated by less interesting characters than usual."

== Bibliography ==
- The Haunted World of Edward D. Wood, Jr. (1996), documentary film directed by Brett Thompson
- Rudolph Grey, Nightmare of Ecstasy: The Life and Art of Edward D. Wood, Jr. (1992) ISBN 978-0-922915-24-8
- Will Sloan, "Can Your Heart Stand the Shocking Facts About Kelton the Cop A/K/A Paul Marco?" Filmfax (April 2005), p. 88-89

== Sources ==
- Craig, Rob (2009). Ed Wood, Mad Genius: A Critical Study of the Films. McFarland & Company, Inc. ISBN 978-0-7864-3955-3.
- Craig, Rob (2013), "The Unearthly", It Came from 1957, McFarland & Company, ISBN 978-0786477777
- Grey, Rudolph (1992). Nightmare of Ecstacy: The Life and Art of Edward D. Wood Jr. Feral House. ISBN 0-922915-04-0.
- Hogan, David J. (1997), "Edward D. Wood, Jr", Dark Romance: Sexuality in the Horror Film, McFarland & Company, ISBN 978-0786462483
- Rhodes, Gary D.; Weaver, Tom (2015). Ed Wood's Bride of the Monster. BearManor Media. ISBN 978-1-59393-857-4.
- Ruffles, Tom (2004), "A Thematic Approach to Cinematic Ghosts", Ghost Images: Cinema of the Afterlife, McFarland & Company, ISBN 978-0786484218
- Weaver, Tom (2000), "Paul Marco", Return of the B Science Fiction and Horror Heroes: The Mutant Melding of Two Volumes of Classic Interviews, McFarland & Company, ISBN 978-0786407552
