= The Hellcats =

1967 film by Robert Slatzer

- Theatrical release poster
- Directed by: Robert F. Slatzer
- Written by: Tony Huston; Robert F. Slatzer
- Produced by: Anthony Cardoza
- Starring: Ross Hagen; Dee Duffy; Sharyn Kinzie; Del "Sonny" West; Robert F. Slatzer; Tony Lorea; Eric Lidberg; Shannon Summers
- Cinematography: Gil Hubbs
- Edited by: Bud Hoffman
- Distributed by: Crown International Pictures
- Release dates: May 18, 1968 (United States); December 16, 1968 (Sweden)
- Running time: 90 minutes
- Country: United States
- Language: English

The Hellcats, also known as Biker Babes, is a 1968 outlaw biker film starring Ross Hagen and directed by Robert F. Slatzer. It was featured on the television series Mystery Science Theater 3000 as the 9th episode of season two.

The script was originally written by James Gordon White.

== Plot ==
As the film opens, a motorcycle gang called the Hellcats is burying their deceased leader, Big Daddy, while being watched from a distance by two groups. One group consists of Detective Dave Chapman and his partner, who have been monitoring the Hellcats and their criminal activity. The other group is mobster Mr. Adrian and his henchmen. Adrian uses the Hellcats to move narcotics from Mexico into California, and, unknown to the gang, had Big Daddy killed after learning he was an informant for Chapman. Adrian and his goons decide to kill Chapman to end his investigation, and a sniper murders him on a romantic day out with his fiancée, Linda.

Following this, Dave's brother Monte, a sergeant in the United States Army, returns from active duty only to learn of his brother's death. Linda and Monte learn of the Hellcats from Dave's notes and decide to get revenge. Posing as a biker couple, they meet the Hellcats at their usual hangout, a dive bar called "Moonfire Inn." Monte has difficulty getting respect from the gang's new leader, Snake, but adopts a gruff, defensive attitude that seems to impress Sheila, the driving force of the Hellcats and their contact with Adrian. Monte and Linda watch a drunken gang party from the sidelines, looking for chances to gather information. One of Adrian's henchmen comes in with orders for Sheila from Adrian. When he turns aggressive after being rejected by Sheila, Monte comes to her rescue and manages to get a look at the note with Sheila's orders, learning that the drugs originate in Mexico.

The gang takes the party to the country, where they continue to drink, dance, and take drugs. A rival gang arrives and their leader challenges Snake to a bike race which devolves into a brawl. After Monte stops the brawl, the Hellcats question his toughness. To stay in their good graces, he accepts a test of endurance with Snake: Each man is tied by his feet to an all terrain vehicle while he holds onto a bar tied to another ATV. Both riders engage their engines and the man must last at least fifteen seconds being pulled between the two. Snake loses, and Monte gains the respect of the gang and has sex with Sheila. While this is going on, Linda retreats to the main party area and is offered heroin by Six-Pack. With hard evidence of the Hellcats' drug running, Linda accepts an invitation from Sheila to join her on her ride to pick up more drugs from their supplier, a man named Scorpio.

Sheila, Linda, and Betty meet Scorpio at night and hide the drugs behind the headlights of their motorcycles. On the way back to Moonfire Inn, they are pursued by a cop car. After splitting up, Betty is followed and drives into a ditch, dying on impact. Sheila reports the news to Adrian, who demands the Hellcats retrieve the drugs hidden in Betty's bike, which has now been impounded by the police. Sheila orders Moongoose to retrieve it, but he's caught by the police and arrested. Sheila drives to Adrian's headquarters, followed by Linda, who in turn is followed by Monte.

Hearing that the police have captured a gang member and found the heroin, Adrian flies into a rage and prepares to flee to Tahiti. When Sheila and Linda arrive, Adrian, further infuriated to learn that Sheila had allowed herself to be followed, has Sheila tied up in the shop room and beaten while he attempts to seduce Linda. Monte arrives and is captured by Adrian's henchmen. They beat him and tie him up in the shop room next to Sheila. Linda pretends to be interested in Adrian's advances while Sheila finds a Dremel tool, which she uses to cut Monte's bonds. He unties her and goes to rescue Linda, only to be apprehended again.

Sheila runs to a payphone, where she calls the other Hellcats for help. Adrian and his henchmen take Linda and Monte to the docks, where they are thrown into a garbage barge to die. Adrian's escape is delayed due to issues with his boat and the Hellcats arrive before he has a chance to leave. The gang assaults Adrian and his underlings and free Monte and Linda as sirens blare.

Later, Monte and Linda prepare to leave town separately. The Hellcats have been arrested for their role in the drug ring, but Monte hopes that Mongoose's confession will spare the gang too harsh a sentence. Linda drives off in her car as Monte rides his motorcycle into the distance.

== Cast ==
- Ross Hagen as Monte Chapman
- Dee Duffy as Linda
- Sharyn Kinzie as Sheila
- Sonny West as Snake
- Robert F. Slatzer as Mr. Adrian (credited as Bob Slatzer)
- Tony Lorea as Six Pack
- Eric Lidberg as Hiney
- Shannon Summers as Rita
- Bro Beck as Det. Dave Chapman
- Diane Ryder as Candy Cave

=== Featuring ===
- Nick Raymond as Pepper
- Hildegard Wendt as Hilde
- Dick Merrifield as Dean
- Tony Cardoza as Artist
- Elena Engstrom as Artist's Model
- Irene Martin as Dee the Addict
- Frederic Downs as Jack the Innkeeper
- Noble "Kid" Chissell as Sheriff
- Robert Strong as Deputy
- Ed Sarquist as Zombie
- Gus Trikonis as Scorpio
- Lydia Goya as Betty
- Tom Hanson as Moongoose
- Ray Cantrell as Scab
- Eric Tomlin as Policeman
- Warren Hammeck as Attorney
- Jack Denton as Detective
- Walt Swanner as Senator Carter
- Bill Reese as Senator Lindfield

== Home media ==
- The Hellcats was released with Chain Gang Women as a double-feature DVD, which was part of the "Welcome to the Grindhouse" series.
- The Mystery Science Theater 3000 version of the film was released on VHS by Rhino Home Video on January 30, 2001. It was later released on DVD by Rhino on June 11, 2002, with the uncut version of the film as an extra.
- The Hellcats was released as a stand-alone DVD by Cheezy Flicks Entertainment in 2012.
