= Tor Johnson =

Swedish professional wrestler and actor (1903–1971)

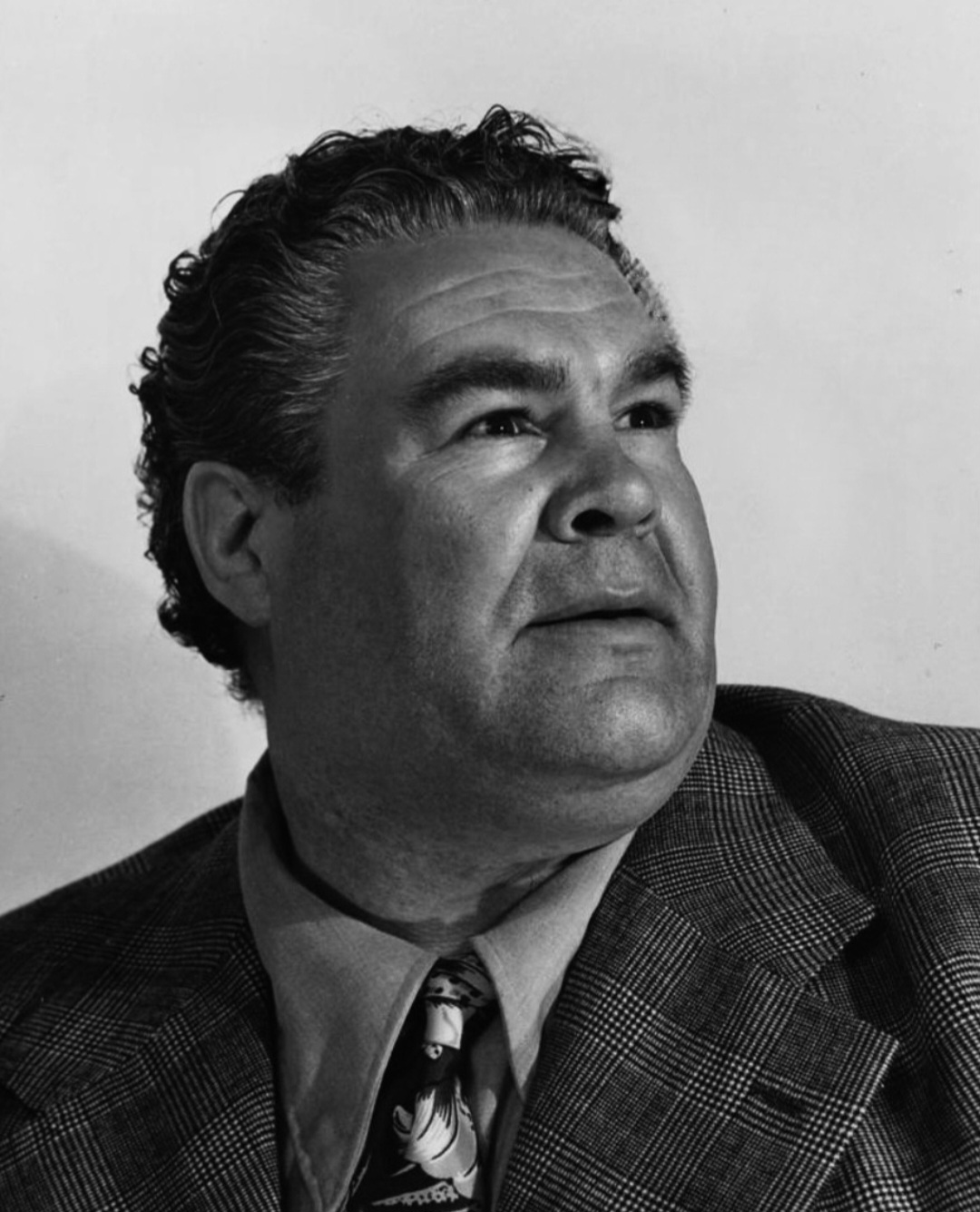
- Johnson c. 1940
- Born: Karl Erik Tore Johansson; 19 October 1903; Brännkyrka, Stockholms län, Sweden
- Died: 12 May 1971 (aged 67); San Fernando, California, U.S.
- Resting place: Plot 177, Eternal Valley Memorial Park, Newhall, Santa Clarita, California
- Other names: Super Swedish Angel; Thor Johnson; King Kong
- Occupations: Professional wrestler, actor
- Years active: 1934–1961
- Spouse: Greta Maria Alfrida Johansson
- Children: 1

Karl Erik Tore Johansson (19 October 1903 – 12 May 1971), better known by the stage name Tor Johnson, was a Swedish professional wrestler and actor. As an actor, Johnson appeared in many B-movies, including some famously directed by Ed Wood. In professional wrestling, Johnson was billed as Thor Johnson and Super Swedish Angel.

== Early life ==
Johnson was born on 19 October 1903 in Brännkyrka, Stockholms län, Sweden, as Karl Erik Tore Johansson to Karl Johan Johansson and Lovisa Kristina Pettersson. His death certificate and grave list 1903 as the year of his birth, contradicting published genealogy records. Johnson's wrestler's license renewal application to the State Athletic Commission of California, signed by Johnson in 1936, lists his date of birth as 19 October 1906.

== Career ==
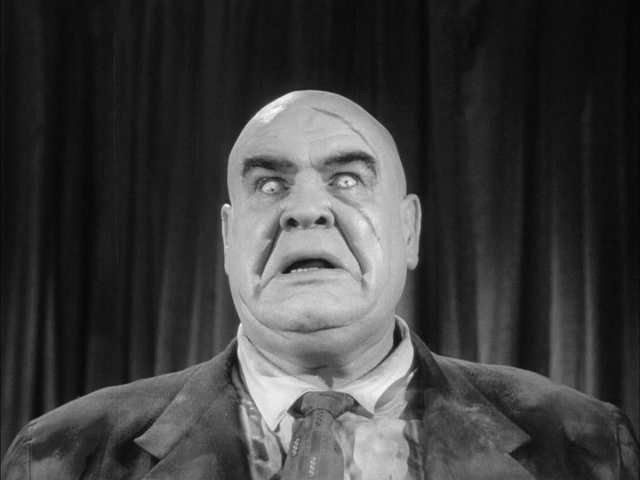
Johnson in Plan 9 from Outer Space (1957)

Johnson stood 6 feet 3 inches (1.91 metres) and weighed 440 pounds (200 kg) at his heaviest. He had a full head of blond hair, but shaved it to maintain an imposing and villainous appearance in his wrestling and acting work. He began getting bit parts in films upon moving to California, usually as the strongman or weightlifter, as early as 1934. In the same year, Johnson was one of over 50 wrestlers who took part in a two-month Los Angeles tournament for California's version of the world title. His film career ended in the early 1960s, after he appeared in a string of low-budget, poorly-rated films. However, he continued to make appearances on television and made a number of commercials.

Tor Johnson used the ring name Super Swedish Angel to distinguish himself from Nils Phillip Olofsson who used the ring name Swedish Angel. The name was derived from wrestler Maurice Tillet, known as The French Angel.

During his career as an actor, Johnson befriended director Ed Wood, who directed him in a number of films, including Bride of the Monster and Plan 9 from Outer Space; writing for Turner Classic Movies, film critic Donald Liebenson described Johnson's performance in Plan 9 as "gonzo". Johnson was very friendly to work with; actress Valda Hansen, who worked with Johnson in 1959's Night of the Ghouls, described him as "like a big sugar bun". During this period, Johnson appeared as a guest contestant on the quiz show You Bet Your Life, during which he showed the show's host, Groucho Marx, his "scariest face". Marx ran off the stage in mock terror, then returned and pleaded: "Don't make that face again!"

== Death and legacy ==
Johnson died of heart failure in San Fernando, California, at the age of 67 and is buried at Eternal Valley Memorial Park, in Santa Clarita, California.

Johnson was portrayed by wrestler George "The Animal" Steele in Tim Burton's film Ed Wood (1994).

Johnson was featured extensively in the early work of cartoonist Drew Friedman, where Johnson was depicted as "Tor", a slow-witted, white-eyed lummox based on Johnson's persona in Ed Wood's films. The first of the one-page comics, "Tor Johnson at Home", was published in a 1981 issue of Robert Crumb's Weirdo, and the original artwork was purchased by television writer and producer Eddie Gorodetsky.

A latex mask based on Johnson's face, sculpted by Pat Newman for Don Post Studios, is described as "the best-selling Halloween horror mask of the late 1960s–early 1970s".

== Filmography ==
=== Film ===
| Year | Title | Role | Notes |
|---|---|---|---|
| 1934 | Registered Nurse | Sonnevich | Uncredited |
| 1934 | Kid Millions | Torturer | Uncredited |
| 1935 | Some Class | Tough Guy | Short, Uncredited |
| 1935 | Man on the Flying Trapeze | Tosoff | Uncredited |
| 1936 | Under Two Flags | Bidou | Uncredited |
| 1941 | Shadow of the Thin Man | Jack the Ripper (wrestler) | Uncredited |
| 1942 | Gentleman Jim | The Mauler | Uncredited |
| 1943 | The Meanest Man in the World | Vladimir Pulasky | Uncredited |
| 1943 | Swing Out the Blues | Weightlifter | |
| 1944 | Ghost Catchers | Mug | Uncredited |
| 1944 | The Canterville Ghost | Bold Sir Guy | Uncredited |
| 1944 | Lost in a Harem | Majordomo | Uncredited |
| 1945 | Sudan | Slaver | Uncredited |
| 1947 | Road to Rio | Sandor | Uncredited |
| 1948 | State of the Union | Wrestler | Uncredited |
| 1948 | Behind Locked Doors | The Champ | Uncredited" |
| 1949 | Alias the Champ | Super Swedish Angel | |
| 1950 | The Reformer and the Redhead | Big Finnish man | Uncredited |
| 1950 | Abbott and Costello in the Foreign Legion | Abou Ben | |
| 1951 | The Lemon Drop Kid | Super Swedish Angel | |
| 1951 | Dear Brat | | Uncredited |
| 1951 | Angels in the Outfield | Wrestler On TV | Uncredited |
| 1952 | The San Francisco Story | Buck | Uncredited |
| 1952 | Lady in the Iron Mask | Renac | Uncredited |
| 1953 | Houdini | Strong Man | Uncredited |
| 1955 | Bride of the Monster | Lobo | |
| 1955 | You're Never Too Young | Train passenger | Uncredited |
| 1956 | Carousel | Strongman | Uncredited |
| 1956 | The Black Sleep | Mr. Curry | |
| 1957 | Journey to Freedom | Giant Turk | |
| 1957 | The Unearthly | Lobo | Johnson's character famously delivers the line, "Time for go to bed." |
| 1957 | Plan 9 from Outer Space | Inspector Daniel Clay | |
| 1959 | Night of the Ghouls | Lobo | |
| 1961 | The Beast of Yucca Flats | Joseph Javorsky / The Beast | |

=== Television ===
| Year | Series | Role | Episode |
|---|---|---|---|
| 1953–1954 | You Are There | | "The Surrender of Cornwallis at Yorktown" "The Surrender of Corregidor" |
| 1954 | General Electric Theater | Bald Man | "To Lift a Feather" |
| 1954 | Rocky Jones, Space Ranger | Naboro | "Inferno in Space" |
| 1956 | The Adventures of Hiram Holliday | Bandini the Strongman | "Dancing Mouse" |
| 1959 | You Bet Your Life | Tor Johnson | #59-11 |
| 1960 | Adventures in Paradise | Miko | "Once Around the Circuit" "The Lady From South Chicago" |
| 1960 | Peter Gunn | Bruno | "See No Evil" |
| 1960 | Bonanza | Busthead Brannigan | "San Francisco" |
| 1961 | Shirley Temple's Storybook | The Strongman | "Pippi Longstocking" |
