= Tom Mason (actor, born 1920) =

American actor

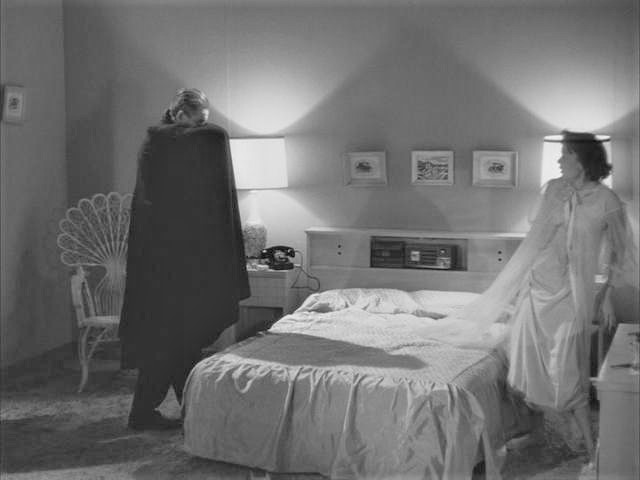
- Mason (left) in Plan 9 from Outer Space
- Born: Thomas Robert Mason; April 29, 1920; Illinois, U.S.
- Died: December 1, 1980 (aged 60); Orange, California, U.S.
- Occupations: Chiropractor; actor; film producer
- Years active: 1957–1959
- Spouse: Margaret Mason

Thomas Robert Mason (April 29, 1920 – December 1, 1980) was an American chiropractor, actor and film producer, who was best known for appearing in films directed by Ed Wood. Ed Wood was married to one of Mason's former patients.

== Biography ==
Best known as the body double for the deceased Bela Lugosi in Wood's 1957 movie Plan 9 from Outer Space, Mason, who was taller than and bore little physical resemblance to Lugosi, hunched over and held a cape over his face in all of his scenes. Mason appeared in (and helped produce) two of Ed Wood's other movies, including Night of the Ghouls and Final Curtain, after which his career in showbiz ended. Mason's wife, Margaret Mason, played the role of "Martha Edwards" in Night of the Ghouls as well.

Tom Mason died in Orange, California, in 1980, at age 60. His wife Margaret was one of the people interviewed in the 1992 Ed Wood documentary Flying Saucers Over Hollywood.

== Legacy ==
In 1994, Mason was portrayed in director Tim Burton's film Ed Wood by actor Ned Bellamy.

== Filmography ==
- Plan 9 from Outer Space (1957) (as the stand-in for Bela Lugosi)
- Final Curtain (1957) 1/2-hour projected pilot for a TV series
- Night of the Ghouls (1959) as Zombie sitting in Coffin
- Flying Saucers Over Hollywood (1992 documentary) archive footage

== See also ==
- Fake Shemp
