= Robert Cornthwaite (actor) =

American actor

Robert Rae Cornthwaite
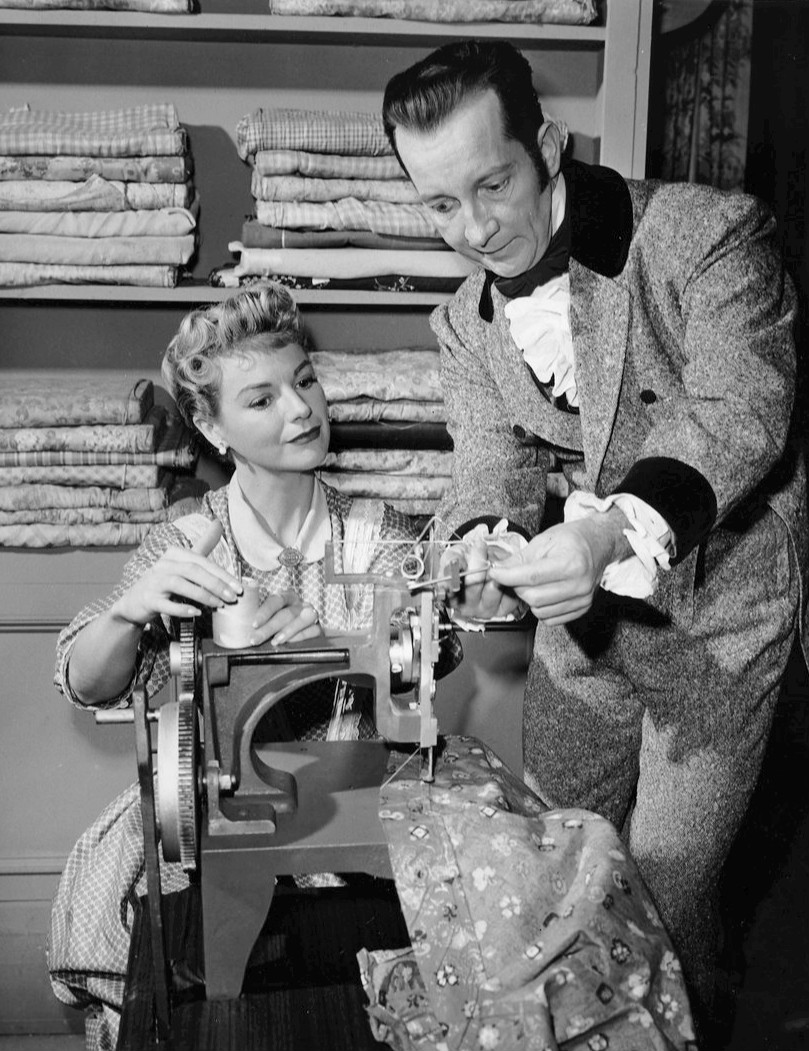
- Cornthwaite and Nan Leslie in an episode of The Californians, 1958
- Born: Robert Rae Cornthwaite; April 28, 1917; Saint Helens, Oregon, U.S.
- Died: July 20, 2006 (aged 89); Woodland Hills, Los Angeles, U.S.
- Education: University of Southern California
- Years active: 1950–2005

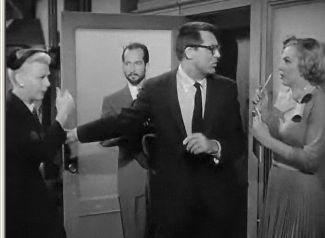
(L-R) Ginger Rogers, Robert Cornthwaite, Cary Grant and Marilyn Monroe in Monkey Business (1952)

Robert Rae Cornthwaite (April 28, 1917 – July 20, 2006) was an American film and television character actor.

== Biography ==
Cornthwaite was born in Saint Helens, Oregon, on April 28, 1917. His interest in acting began in his early teens, when he was forced to recite one line in a school play. He began his acting career in 1937, appearing in a college production of Twelfth Night, while attending Reed College in Portland, Oregon.

In the late 1930s, he enrolled in Long Beach City College and worked at radio stations in Southern California. He earned a degree from the University of Southern California after serving as an intelligence officer in the Army Air Force during World War II.

Cornthwaite began his time in the US Army Air Force as a radio-gunner in B-25 aircraft as part of the 12th Medium Bombardment Group in 1942. He then served as a radio operator and superintendent of the watch with the 79th Fighter Group from 1943-1944. This was followed by serving as a writer and broadcaster with the Mediterranean Allied Air Forces from 1944 until 1945. In this position he performed Public Relations duties in Naples, Rome, Corsica, and other locations in the Mediterranean area. While on Corsica, Cornthwaite worked on his first film which was for the Free French Air Force. He acted as a writer and sound engineer recording Capitaine Eve Curie (daughter of Marie and Pierre Curie) of the Free French Air Force. He did the commentary in French and English. Cornthwaite also dubbed the voice of American Air Force General Ira Eaker, who did not speak French.

In 1951, Cornthwaite was cast in Howard Hawks's production of The Thing from Another World. His character, Dr. Carrington, the unofficial leader of an Arctic polar expedition, observes the nearby crash of an unidentified flying object, and urges his military counterparts to communicate with the creature inside, even at the cost of their own lives. This performance eventually earned him entry into the "Science Fiction Hall of Fame" in 1993.

Other notable films include The War of the Worlds, What Ever Happened to Baby Jane?, Colossus: The Forbin Project and the Joe Dante production of Matinee, in which he shared screen time with fellow 1950s screen notables, William Schallert and Kevin McCarthy in the "film within a film", "MANT", a spoof of sci-fi films. Similarly, Cornthwaite appeared as Dr. Carrington opposite Ken Tobey (again as Hendry) in a spoof titled Attack of the B Movie Monster, shot in 1984. Expanded and retitled The Naked Monster, it was released on DVD in 2005 by Anthem Pictures.

== Stage and television work ==
He remained primarily a stage actor throughout his career, and translated a number of plays from French to English. Balancing his theater work with "bill-paying" jobs, he appeared frequently on television, including a role as naturalist John James Audubon in three episodes of the Desilu Studios Production, The Adventures of Jim Bowie, starring Scott Forbes.

He appeared twice as Joe Brennan in the first Brian Keith television series, Crusader, which aired on CBS in the middle 1950s. He appeared in five episodes of CBS's Perry Mason, including the role of murderer Herbert Dean in the series' third episode in 1957, "The Case of the Nervous Accomplice", and murderer Carl Bruner in the 1962 episode, "The Case of the Ancient Romeo".

He also made appearances during the 1950s, 1960s and 1970s in such series as Perry Mason, The Andy Griffith Show, The Untouchables, Crossroads, The Californians, Rescue 8, The Twilight Zone, The Roaring 20s, The Rifleman, Death Valley Days, Gunsmoke, Voyage to the Bottom of the Sea, Batman (episodes 35 and 36), The Monkees, Gidget, Laverne & Shirley, Dragnet, Combat!, The Munsters, Laredo, Murder She Wrote, Kate and Allie, and Get Smart, in which he had a semi-recurring role as CONTROL's lab scientist, Professor Windish.

One of his last major stage roles was in a La Jolla Playhouse production of The Cherry Orchard opposite Lynn Redgrave. Among Cornthwaite's last television works was a recurring role as a man with Alzheimer's on the series Picket Fences.

== Death ==
Cornthwaite died at the Motion Picture and Television Country House and Hospital in Woodland Hills, Los Angeles, California, aged 89, on July 20, 2006. His death was attributed to natural causes.

== Partial filmography ==
- Union Station (1950) as Emergency Room Orderly (uncredited)
- Gambling House (1950) as Stefan (uncredited)
- The Thing from Another World (1951) as Dr. Arthur Carrington
- The Mark of the Renegade (1951) as Innkeeper
- His Kind of Woman (1951) as Hernandez (uncredited)
- Something to Live For (1952) as Young Man (uncredited)
- Monkey Business (1952) as Dr. Zoldeck
- The War of the Worlds (1953) as Dr. Pryor
- Day of Triumph (1954) as Simon the Zealot
- Stranger on Horseback (1955) as Arnold Hammer
- Kiss Me Deadly (1955) as FBI Agent #1
- The Purple Mask (1955) as Napoleon Bonaparte
- The Leather Saint (1956) as Dr. Lomas
- The Spirit of St. Louis (1957) as Harry Knight, Lindbergh Student (uncredited)
- Hell on Devil's Island (1957) as Governor Renault
- The Power of the Resurrection (1958) as Caiaphas
- Ten Seconds to Hell (1959) as Franz Loeffler
- Day of the Outlaw (1959) as Tommy Preston, Wyoming Hotel Owner
- Perry Mason (1960) as Bill Worth
- Reptilicus (1961) as Man (voice, uncredited)
- All Hands on Deck (1961) as Naval Inspector (uncredited)
- The Alfred Hitchcock Hour (1962) (Season 1 Episode 10: "Day of Reckoning") as District Attorney
- What Ever Happened to Baby Jane? (1962) as Dr. Shelby
- The Twilight Zone (1963) (Season 4 Episode 10: "No Time Like the Past") as Hanford
- The Alfred Hitchcock Hour (1964) (Season 2 Episode 12: "Three Wives Too Many") as Mr. Bleeker
- The Ghost and Mr. Chicken (1966) as Lawyer Springer
- The Ride to Hangman's Tree (1967) as T.L. Harper
- Waterhole No. 3 (1967) as George, Hotel Clerk
- The Monkees (1967) (Season 2 Episode 9: "The Card Carrying Red Shoes") – Nyetovitch
- The Legend of Lylah Clare (1968) as Studio Photo Archivist (uncredited)
- Colossus: The Forbin Project (1970) as First Scientist
- The Peace Killers (1971) as Ben
- The Longest Night (1972) as Frank Cavanaugh
- Journey Through Rosebud (1972) as Hearing Officer
- Futureworld (1976) as Mr. Reed
- Deal of the Century (1983) as Huddleston
- Who's That Girl (1987) as Minister
- Time Trackers (1989) as Dr. Alistair Craig
- Frame Up (1991) as Earl Cott
- Matinee (1993) as Dr. Flankon (uncredited)
- The Naked Monster (2005) as Dr. Carrington (final film role)
- The Primevals (2023) as Lloyd Trent (completed posthumously)
