= The Amazing Criswell =

American psychic (1907–1982)

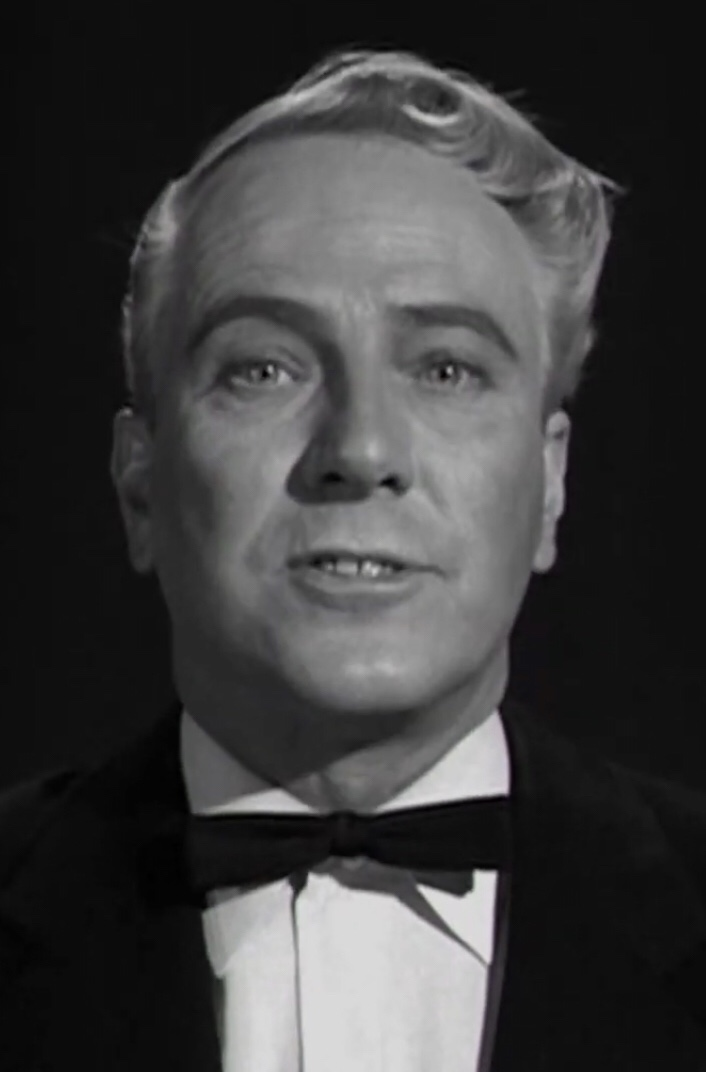
- Criswell in Plan 9 from Outer Space (1957)
- Born: Jeron Criswell King; August 18, 1907; Princeton, Indiana, U.S.
- Died: October 4, 1982 (aged 75); Burbank, California, U.S.
- Resting place: Pierce Brothers Valhalla Memorial Park
- Other names: Jeron Criswell King; Charles Criswell King
- Occupations: Showman, actor, writer, seer
- Years active: 1950s–1970s
- Known for: Making erroneous predictions, predicting the future on TV, radio, books, records and in newspapers and as a narrator and actor in the films of Ed Wood
- Notable work: Criswell Predicts from Now to the Year 2000! (author); Plan 9 from Outer Space (narrator and actor)
- Television: Criswell Predicts
- Spouse: Halo Meadows

Jeron Criswell King (August 18, 1907 – October 4, 1982), known by his stage-name The Amazing Criswell (/ˈkrɪzwɛl/), was an American psychic known for his wildly inaccurate predictions. In person, he went by Charles Criswell King, and was sometimes credited as Jeron King Criswell.

Criswell was flamboyant, with spit curled hair, a stentorian style of speaking, and a sequined tuxedo. He owned a coffin in which he claimed to sleep. He grew up in Indiana with relatives who owned a funeral home, and frequently stated he became comfortable with sleeping in caskets in the storeroom.

He appeared in two films directed by Ed Wood—Plan 9 from Outer Space (1957) and Night of the Ghouls (1959)—and also appeared in Orgy of the Dead (1965), which was written by Wood.

== Early life ==
Criswell claimed he never actually talked until the age of four. During a thunderstorm he first spoke, making his first prediction, "the rain will stop." From this point on, he was talkative, often placing himself in the center stage at any opportunity.

== Career ==
Criswell said he had once worked as a radio announcer and news broadcaster. He began buying time on a local Los Angeles television station in the early 1950s to run infomercials for his Criswell Family Vitamins. To fill the time, he began his "Criswell Predicts" part of the show. This made him a minor off-beat celebrity in Los Angeles and around Hollywood, and his friendship with old show-business people such as Mae West and rising fringe celebrities such as Korla Pandit made Criswell an entertaining presence at parties. His fame brought him appearances on Tonight Starring Jack Paar (1957–1962).

He published predictions in three issues of Spaceway magazine (February 1955, April 1955, and June 1955), as well as in a weekly syndicated newspaper article starting on September 6, 1951. He later published three books of predictions; From Now to the Year 2000, Your Next Ten Years, and Forbidden Predictions.

He also recorded a long playing record, Your Incredible Future (which was later released on CD), featuring 42 minutes of his predictions in his own voice.

Criswell appeared in the movies of writer and director Ed Wood.

After Criswell's death, his longtime friend Paul Marco released Criswell's song "Someone Walked Over My Grave" on a 7" record which was recorded by Criswell as a memorial song he only wanted released posthumously.

=== Filmography, recording and television appearances ===
Year	Medium	Title	Role	Director
filmed 1956, premiered 1957	Film	Plan 9 from Outer Space	Himself	Ed Wood
filmed 1958, premiered 1959	Film	Night of the Ghouls	Himself	Ed Wood
1965	Film	Orgy of the Dead	The Emperor	Stephen C. Apostolof
1982	Film	It Came from Hollywood	Archive footage	Malcolm Leo, Andrew Solt
1994	Documentary	Ed Wood: Look Back in Angora'	Archive footage	Ted Newsom
1996	Documentary	The Haunted World of Edward D. Wood Jr.	Archive footage	Brett Thompson
1970	Spoken Word Recording (LP)	The Legendary Criswell Predicts Your Incredible Future	Himself	Horoscope Productions
1970, 1965, 1963	Television	The Tonight Show Starring Johnny Carson	Himself	Frederick De Cordova
2007	Television	Cinema Insomnia (Plan 9 from Outer Space & Hardware Wars)	Himself	Ernie Fosselius & Mr. Lobo

== Predictions ==
"Criswell Predicts" scene in Plan 9 from Outer Space

Criswell's predictions were nationally syndicated and he appeared on the television show Criswell Predicts on KLAC Channel 13 (now KCOP-13) in Los Angeles as well as being recorded for syndication. His announcer was Bob Shields, who later played the judge on The Judge. Criswell wore heavy makeup in public after his live program was broadcast in Los Angeles. Only selected people were allowed in the KCOP studio during his broadcast.

Criswell wrote several books of predictions, including 1968's Criswell Predicts: From Now to the Year 2000. In it, he claimed that Denver, Colorado would be struck by a ray from space that would cause all metal to adopt the qualities of rubber, leading to horrific accidents at amusement parks. He predicted mass cannibalism and the end of planet Earth, which he set as happening on August 18, 1999 (which would have been his 92nd birthday).

Criswell was a student of history. He believed history repeated itself and that the United States were the "modern Romans". Each day, he read the St. Louis Post-Dispatch looking for clues for his predictions.

On The Jack Paar Program in March 1963, he predicted US President John F. Kennedy would not run for reelection in 1964 because something was going to happen to him in November 1963.

Sources say that Criswell never claimed to be a real psychic; however, those who knew him, including actress and fellow Plan 9 alumna Maila Nurmi ("Vampira"), believed he was. According to writer Charles A. Coulombe, whose family rented an apartment from him, Criswell told Coulombe's father "[I] had the gift, but [I] lost it when I started taking money for it."

== Private life ==
Criswell married a former speakeasy dancer named Halo Meadows, who once appeared on You Bet Your Life.

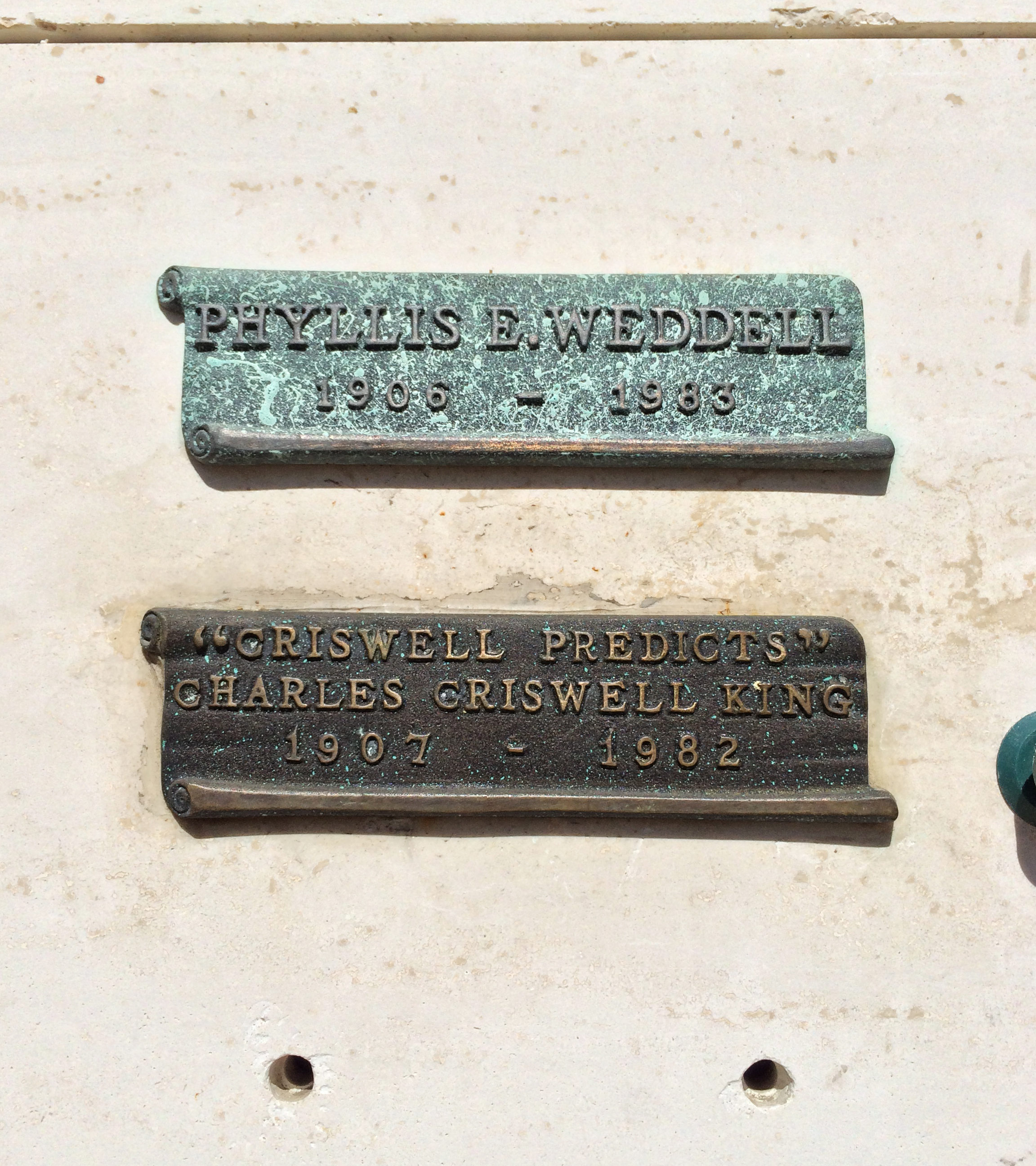
Niche of "The Amazing Criswell" at Valhalla Memorial Park

Mae West used Criswell as her personal psychic; he once predicted her rise to President of the United States, whereupon she, Criswell and George Liberace, the brother of showman Liberace, would take a rocket to the Moon. Criswell and West were great friends and she would lavish him with home-cooked food which she had delivered to the studio that he shared with Maila Nurmi ("Vampira"). It is said that West sold Criswell her old luxury cars for five dollars.

Criswell died on October 4, 1982, at the age of 75; he was cremated days later.

== Legacy ==
- In 1955, Mae West wrote and recorded a song called "Criswell Predicts" for her album The Fabulous Mae West
- In 1994, Criswell was portrayed in the Tim Burton biopic Ed Wood by actor Jeffrey Jones.
- In 1997, several actors, including Sean Phillip Mabrey, have played Criswell in Plan 9 from Outer Space: The Musical, written by David G. Smith.
- In 1999, the film Devil Girls featured a portrayal of Criswell by Rob Gorden.
- In 2000, the song "Criswell Predicts" by pop punk band Groovie Ghoulies appeared on their album Travels with My Amp.
- In 2005, Criswell and the Plan 9 cast were lampooned in an episode of the television series, Deadly Cinema, and clips of this episode were featured in the documentary, Vampira: The Movie.
- In 2006, Craig Brown played Criswell in Plan Live from Outer Space, a stage adaptation of Plan 9 from Outer Space which won a Canadian Comedy Award the following year.
- In 2009, a teaser trailer was released by Darkstone Entertainment for the John Johnson film Plan 9, a remake of Plan 9 from Outer Space. The voice of popular television horror host Mr. Lobo can be heard narrating the trailer as Criswell. He also portrayed Criswell in the film, in a much larger role in this re-imagining of the original Ed Wood story. In addition, for the purpose of promoting the film on the internet, Mr. Lobo has produced 62 episodes of Criswell Predicts! which is a parody and homage to Criswell's original television program of the same name sans the exclamation mark.
- In 2013, the song "Criswell Predicts" by pop-punk band Hey Mister! appeared on their EP A Trip for Biscuits.
