= The Skydivers =

1963 film by Coleman Francis

- Original release poster
- Directed by: Coleman Francis
- Written by: Coleman Francis
- Produced by: Anthony Cardoza
- Starring: Kevin Casey; Eric Tomlin; Anthony Cardoza; Marcia Knight
- Cinematography: Austin McKinney; Lee Strosnider
- Edited by: Bob Lusby
- Music by: John Bath
- Distributed by: Crown International Pictures
- Release date: November 13, 1963
- Running time: 75 minutes
- Country: United States
- Language: English

The Skydivers is a 1963 American crime film written and directed by Coleman Francis and produced by Anthony Cardoza. It stars Kevin Casey, Eric Tomlin, Anthony Cardoza, and Marcia Knight, with a performance by influential guitarist Jimmy Bryant.

After falling into obscurity for three decades, the film found second life in 1994, serving as the basis for a Mystery Science Theater 3000 episode (during which TV's Frank describes it as like "Manos without the lucid plot"). Trace Beaulieu, the voice of Crow T. Robot in the Comedy Central-era of the show and portrayer of Dr. Clayton Forrester, stated in an interview presented in Thanksgiving 1995 on Comedy Central's 5th Turkey Day marathon for MST3K during the MST Anthology segments that he felt “Skydivers” was the worst movie they had riffed on at that time, during the episode's run on the marathon.

== Plot ==
Harry and Beth Rowe run a small skydiving facility in an unnamed desert town. One day, a woman named Suzy Belmont arrives looking for the Rowes' plane mechanic Frankie Bonner. Beth claims that Frankie was fired for being drunk on the job, but suspects that Suzy didn't visit just to see Frankie. As she walks away, Beth can't help but feel that her husband is having an affair with this floozy. It turns out that Harry is, but has managed to keep it a secret from his wife. One evening, they receive a letter from Harry's friend, Joe Moss. Joe wants to visit and is looking for a job. Beth points out that Joe could easily fill Frankie's position and Harry consents.

Later, Frankie returns to the skydiving facility, but Harry catches him trying to sabotage a plane and accosts him. Frankie demands that Harry stay away from Suzy. Harry agrees but warns that he'll break both of Frankie's legs if he ever returns to the facility.

Joe Moss eventually arrives and the Rowes greet him warmly. Joe is just in time to witness an eager young man, Pete, propose to do a dangerous skydiving stunt. Harry warns that the FAA could reprimand them for that, but Pete is determined to prove he can do it. He starts out fine, but before he can pull his chute he panics and plummets to the ground. The FAA investigates and shuts down the Rowes' skydiving facility. Despondent at this turn of events, Harry drives into town and has a beer at a local bar. He finds Suzy outside and fights off her advances before leaving her in the parking lot fuming.

Incensed at Harry, Suzy plots revenge by convincing love-struck Frankie to help her put acid in Harry's parachute. An unsure Frankie gingerly agrees. Eventually, the facility reopens, and a crowd gathers to see the skydivers. Trouble brews when Harry thinks Beth and Joe are having an affair; Harry even confronts Joe. Harry and Beth soon reconcile and Joe backs off. A night jump and pre-jump party is planned. During the festivities, Suzy and Frankie sneak into the hangar and pour acid on Harry's parachute. The evening's merriment ends in tragedy when Harry's chute rips and he plummets to his death.

A witness reports seeing Suzy and Frankie running away from the preparations room. Joe gets into his car and gives chase, eventually catching up to them. Meanwhile, men from the FAA also track them in a plane while others do so in a car. The two are immediately gunned down without warning by the authorities.

In the aftermath, Joe gives up running the skydiving facility and takes his leave of Beth. As Joe drives away, Beth takes her own leave of the facility.

== Cast ==
- Kevin Casey as Beth Rowe
- Eric Tomlin as Joe Moss
- Anthony Cardoza as Harry Rowe
- Marcia Knight as Suzy Belmont
- Bob Carrano as Bob
- Michael Rae as Red
- Jerry Mann as Bernie
- Keith Walton as Jim the photographer
- Paul Francis as Pete
- Titus Moede as Frankie Bonner
- Jimmy Bryant as Himself
- Susan Bay as Woman in bar
- Coleman Francis as Cigar Spectator / Aerial Gunman (uncredited)

== Critical response ==
A review of the film on DVD Talk described it as "an incomprehensible soap opera of 'he's-cheating-on-her-but-she's-cheating-on-him' back and forth nonsense, done with a cast of characters who are about as colorful as the film's black-and-white photography," additionally noting that "there's also skydiving, probably included in the hopes that the stunts would make the movie in any way interesting to watch. No dice."

== Home media ==
The Mystery Science Theater 3000 version of the film (accompanied by the uncut version, included as a bonus feature) was released in November 2002 by Rhino Home Video as part of the Collection, Volume 1 DVD set. It was re-released by Shout Factory on September 1, 2015.
