= Paul Marco =

American actor (1927–2006)

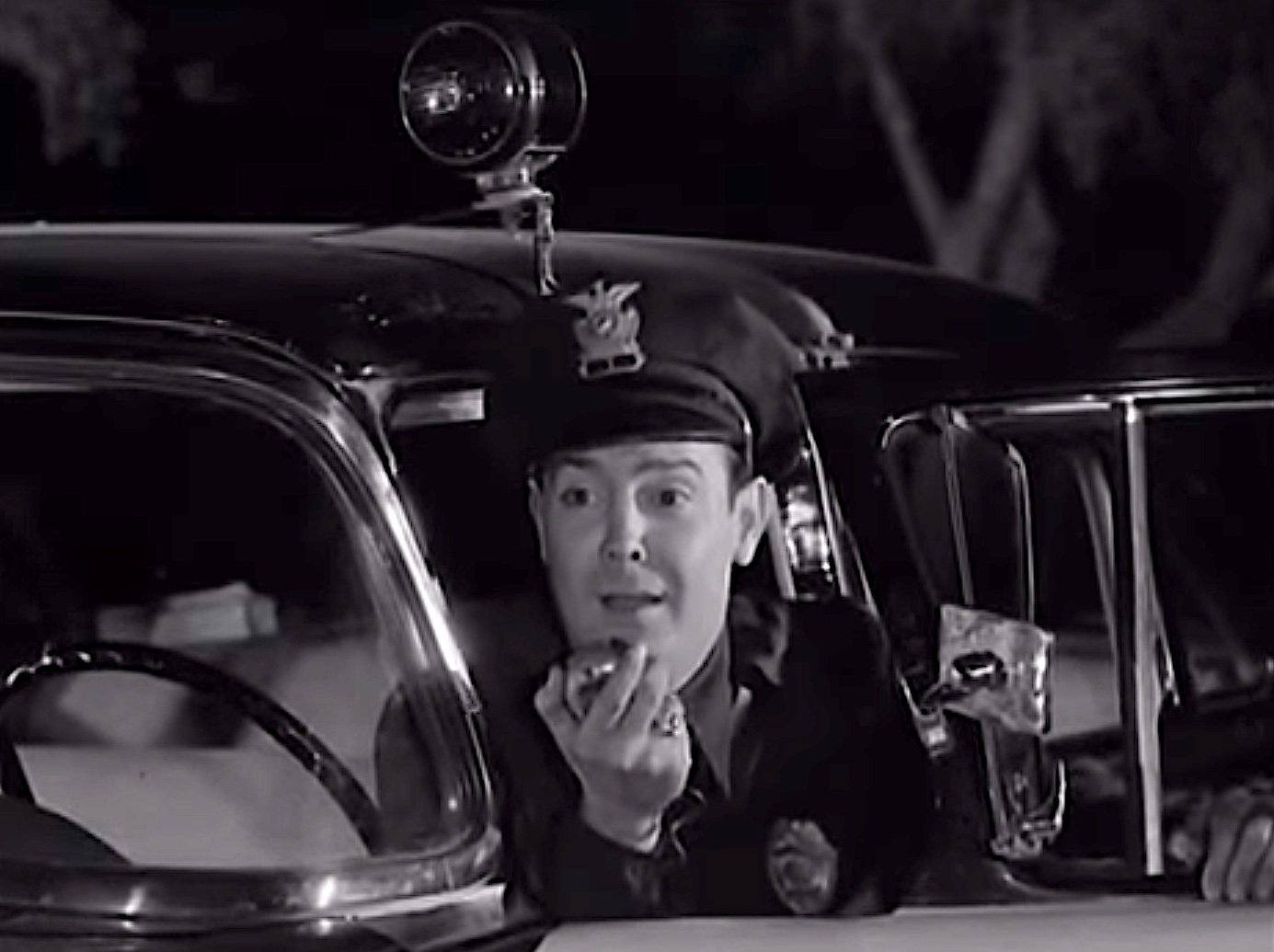
- Paul Marco as "Patrolman Kelton" in the 1959 film Night of the Ghouls
- Born: Angelo Inzalaco; June 10, 1927; Los Angeles, California, U.S.
- Died: May 14, 2006 (aged 78); Hollywood, Los Angeles, California, U.S.
- Occupation: Actor
- Website: http://www.winvisual.com/marco/index.html

Paul Marco (June 10, 1927 – May 14, 2006) was an American actor who often appeared in movies made by Ed Wood, including the "Kelton Trilogy" of Bride of the Monster, Night of the Ghouls and Plan 9 from Outer Space, in which he played a bumbling, fearful policeman named Kelton.

== Career ==
Born in Los Angeles, Marco started taking lessons in drama, singing and dancing at an early age. After graduating from Hollywood High School, he served in the Navy during World War II. His first known movie role was a small part in the 1944 film Sweet and Low-Down with Benny Goodman, Jo Stafford, and The Pied Pipers.

In the early 1950s, The Amazing Criswell predicted on national television that Paul Marco would go far in the motion picture business. Criswell introduced Marco to Ed Wood shortly thereafter. In turn, Marco introduced Wood to Bunny Breckinridge, a flamboyantly gay Shakespearean actor who lived with Marco for a time and co-starred in Wood's Plan 9 from Outer Space.

Marco depended on Wood for parts, and he more or less retired as an actor as Wood's movies shifted more and more towards pornography for the last twenty years of his life.

In Tim Burton's 1994 movie Ed Wood, Marco was portrayed by actor Max Casella.

== Later life and death ==
In 1995, Marco recorded a 45, "Home on the Strange", in which he reprised his Kelton character for Dionysus Records. He revived Kelton once more in the 2005 science fiction satire/tribute film The Naked Monster, which also featured actors from Creature from the Black Lagoon, The Thing from Another World, The War of the Worlds, Beyond the Time Barrier, and The Indestructible Man, all reprising the roles they had played in the cited earlier films.

Marco hoped for a career revival with the "Dark Corner" series of shorts. He completed the first, entitled Kelton's Dark Corner (by Vasily Shumov), and was planning to shoot several scenes for the second before his death.

On May 14, 2006, Paul Marco died after a battle with hip problems and chronic illness, at the age of 78.

== Filmography ==
Film
Year	Film	Role	Notes
1944	Sweet and Low-Down		Uncredited
1952	Hiawatha		Uncredited
1955	Bride of the Monster	Officer Kelton	Alternative title: Bride of the Atom
1957	Plan 9 from Outer Space	Patrolman Kelton	Alternative title: Graverobbers from Outer Space
1959	Night of the Ghouls	Patrolman Kelton	Alternative title: Revenge of the Dead
1961	The Young Savages		Uncredited
1965	Rat Fink		Uncredited
1989	Horror Talk		
2005	The Naked Monster	Kelton the Cop	
2009	Kelton's Dark Corner: Trilogy One	Kelton the Cop	Direct-to-DVD release
Television
Year	Title	Role	Notes
1960	The Donna Reed Show	Plumber #3	1 episode
1960	77 Sunset Strip	Jeep Driver	1 episode
