= Plan 9 from Outer Space =

1957 film by Ed Wood

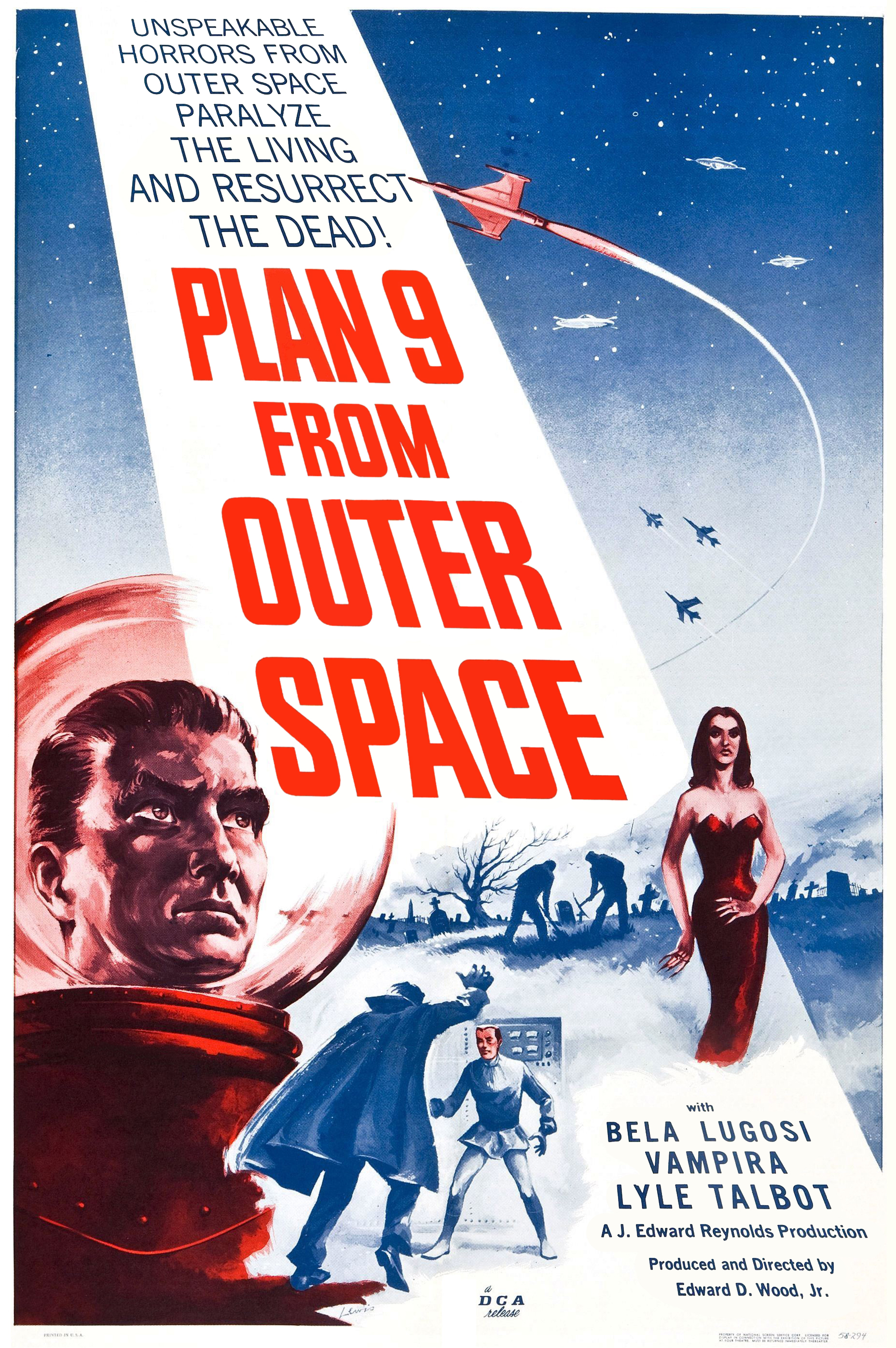
- Theatrical release poster by Tom Jung
- Directed by: Edward D. Wood Jr.
- Written by: Edward D. Wood Jr.
- Produced by: Edward D. Wood Jr. J. Edward Reynolds
- Starring: Gregory Walcott; Bela Lugosi; Maila Nurmi; Tor Johnson; Lyle Talbot
- Narrated by: Criswell
- Cinematography: William C. Thompson
- Edited by: Edward D. Wood Jr.
- Music by: see § Music
- Production companies: Reynolds Pictures, Inc.
- Distributed by: Distributors Corporation of America
- Release date: March 15, 1957 (preview screening)
- Running time: 80 minutes
- Country: United States
- Language: English
- Budget: $60,000

Plan 9 from Outer Space is a 1957 American independent science fiction-horror film produced, written, directed, and edited by Ed Wood. The film was shot in black-and-white in November 1956 and had a preview screening on March 15, 1957, at the Carlton Theatre in Los Angeles under the title Grave Robbers from Outer Space. Retitled Plan 9 from Outer Space, it played in 1957 as a double feature with the British thriller Time Lock, and went into general release in July 1958 in Virginia, Texas, and several other Southern states, before being sold to television in 1961. In Texas, it played on a double bill with the re-released Devil Girl from Mars (1954).

The film stars Gregory Walcott, Mona McKinnon, Tor Johnson, and "Vampira" (Maila Nurmi), and is narrated by Criswell. It also posthumously bills Bela Lugosi (before Lugosi's death in August 1956, Wood had shot silent footage of Lugosi for another, unfinished film, which was inserted into Plan 9). Other guest stars are Hollywood veterans Lyle Talbot, who said he never refused an acting job, and former cowboy star Tom Keene.

The film's storyline concerns extraterrestrials who seek to stop humanity from creating a doomsday weapon that could destroy the universe. The aliens implement "Plan 9", a scheme to resurrect the Earth's dead. By causing chaos, the aliens hope the crisis will force humanity to listen to them; otherwise, the aliens will destroy mankind with armies of the undead.

Plan 9 from Outer Space played on television in relative obscurity from 1961 until 1980, when authors Harry Medved and Michael Medved dubbed it the "worst film ever made" in their book The Golden Turkey Awards. Wood and his film were posthumously given two Golden Turkey Awards for Worst Director Ever and Worst Film Ever. It has since been called "the epitome of so-bad-it's-good cinema" and gained a large cult following.

== Plot ==
Plan 9 from Outer Space (1957)

Mourners gather around an old man (Lugosi) at his wife's grave site as an airliner overhead flies toward Burbank, California. Pilot Jeff Trent and his co-pilot Danny are startled by a bright light, accompanied by a loud noise. They see a flying saucer land in the cemetery near Jeff's house, where two gravediggers are killed by a ghoul (the reanimated wife of the old man).

Lost in grief, the old man is struck and killed by a car in front of his home. Mourners at his funeral discover the gravediggers' corpses. When Inspector Daniel Clay and his police officers arrive, Clay goes alone into the cemetery to investigate.

Jeff tells his wife, Paula (the old man's granddaughter), about his flying saucer encounter, saying that the Army has sworn him to secrecy. Another saucer lands, and a powerful swooshing noise knocks the Trents, and the police officers in the cemetery, to the ground. Inspector Clay is murdered by the ghoul and her husband's now-reanimated corpse. Lieutenant Harper says: "But one thing's sure. Inspector Clay is dead, murdered, and somebody's responsible!".

Newspaper headlines report flying saucer sightings over Hollywood Boulevard, and three of them fly across Los Angeles. In Washington, D.C., the military fires missiles at several saucers. Chief of saucer operations Thomas Edwards says the government has been covering up saucer attacks.

The aliens return to their Space Station 7, and Commander Eros tells the alien ruler that he has been unsuccessful in contacting Earth's governments. Eros recommends "Plan 9", the resurrection of recently deceased humans. Concerned about Paula's safety, Jeff urges her to stay with her mother while he's at work, but she refuses. That night, the undead old man breaks into their house and chases Paula outside, where the female ghoul and Inspector Clay join him. Paula escapes, collapsing in the woods while the three ghouls return to Eros in the saucer.

At the Pentagon, General Roberts tells Edwards that aliens have been telling the government that they are trying to prevent humanity from destroying the universe. Roberts sends Edwards to San Fernando, where most of the alien activity has occurred.

The zombified Inspector Clay goes berserk and attacks Eros, nearly killing him. The ruler approves Eros's Plan 9 to raise armies of the dead to march on Earth's capitals.

Edwards and the police interview the Trents, unaware that the flying saucer has returned to the cemetery. Officer Kelton encounters the old man, who chases him into the Trents' backyard. Eros's long-distance ray strikes the old man, reducing him to a skeleton. Edwards, the Trents, and the police drive to the cemetery.

Harper insists on leaving Paula in the car; Kelton stays with her. Eros and Tanna (his fellow female alien) send Clay to kidnap Paula and lure the other three humans to the saucer. Seeing its glow, Jeff and the police approach it. Clay knocks Kelton unconscious and carries Paula into the woods.

Eros lets Jeff and the police enter the saucer with pistols drawn. He tells them that human weapons development will lead to the discovery of the "solaronite" bomb, a substance that explodes sunlight particles. Such an explosion would set off an uncontrollable chain reaction, destroying the universe. Eros believes that humans are immature and stupid; he intends to destroy humanity, threatening to kill Paula if Jeff and the police try to stop him. Kelton and Larry arrive and see Clay near the saucer carrying the unconscious Paula. They sneak up behind Clay and knock him out with a club. Eros says that Clay's controlling ray has been shut off, which released Paula. He and Jeff have a fistfight inside the ship, and the saucer's equipment is damaged and catches fire. The humans escape, and Tanna and Eros take off. The fire consumes the saucer, which explodes, and the two remaining zombies decompose into skeletons.

== Cast ==
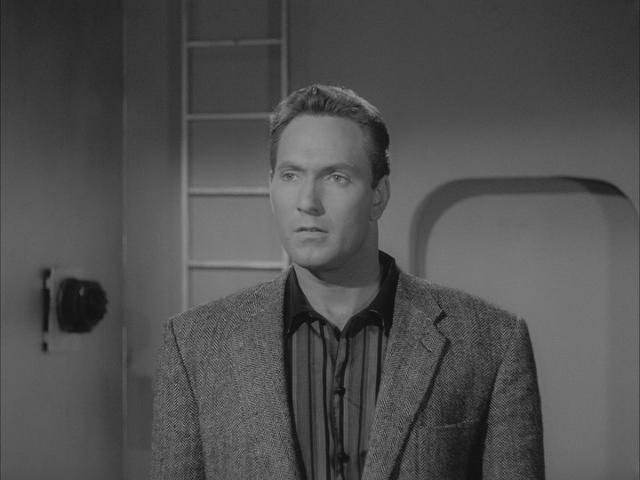
Pilot Jeff Trent (Gregory Walcott) confronts the aliens.

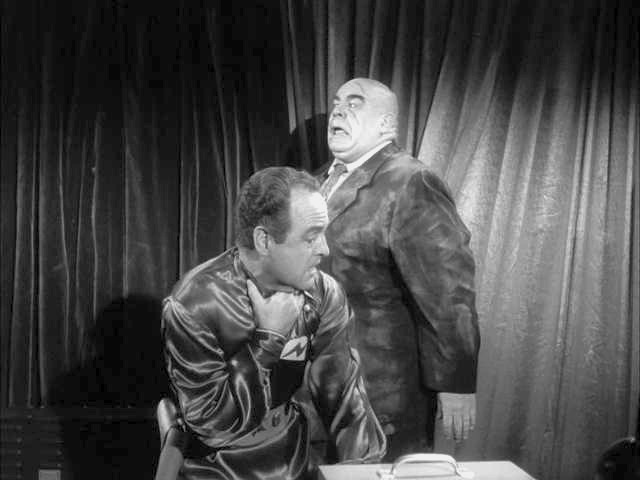
The corpse of Inspector Clay (Tor Johnson) attacks Eros (Dudley Manlove).

- Gregory Walcott as Jeff Trent
- Mona McKinnon as Paula Trent
- Duke Moore as Lieutenant John Harper
- Tom Keene as Colonel Tom Edwards
- Carl Anthony as Patrolman Larry
- Paul Marco as Patrolman Kelton
- Tor Johnson as Inspector Daniel Clay
- Dudley Manlove as Eros
- Joanna Lee as Tanna
- John Breckinridge as The Ruler
- Lyle Talbot as General Roberts
- David De Mering as Danny
- Norma McCarty as Edie the stewardess
- Bill Ash as Captain
- Lynn Lemon as Minister at Clay's funeral
- Ben Frommer and Gloria Dea as Mourners
- Conrad Brooks as Patrolman Jamie
- Maila Nurmi (Vampira) as Vampire Girl
- Bela Lugosi as the Old Man/Ghoul Man
  - Tom Mason as Old Man/Ghoul Man body double, Lugosi's fake Shemp (uncredited)
- Criswell as himself/narrator
- Karl Johnson as Farmer Calder (uncredited)
- Ed Wood as Man Holding Newspaper (uncredited)
- J. Edward Reynolds as Gravedigger (also executive producer)
- Hugh Thomas Jr. as Gravedigger (also associate producer)

== Production ==
=== Background and genre ===
Plan 9 from Outer Space combines elements of science fiction, Atompunk, and gothic horror. Science fiction remained popular throughout the 1950s, though the genre had experienced significant changes in the post-war period. The Atomic Age, heralded by the development of nuclear weapons and the atomic bombings of Hiroshima and Nagasaki, had inspired science fiction films to deal with the dangers of unrestricted science, while space flight and the existence of extraterrestrial life and civilizations (more "traditional" elements of the genre), seemed to hold a new fascination for audiences at the beginning of the Space Race. On the other hand, the height of Gothic film's popularity was during the 1930s and 1940s but it was in decline by the 1950s and considered old-fashioned. By 1950s standards, the combination of dated and modern elements gives the film a rather anachronistic quality.

Plan 9's script seems to aim at being an epic film, a genre typically requiring a big budget from a major film studio. That Wood made it with minimal financial resources underscores one of the qualities of his work: his ideas tended to be too expensive to film, yet he tried to film them anyway. As Rob Craig argues, Wood's failed efforts give the film a peculiar charm. Craig finds that Plan 9 has much in common with both epic theatre ("grand melodrama on a minuscule budget") and the Theatre of the Absurd (characters acting as buffoons, nonsense, and verbosity in dialogue, dreamlike and fantasy imagery, hints of allegory, and a narrative structure where continuity is consistently undermined).

=== Financing ===
Turner Classic Movies describes the production as having been financed under a contract with a Baptist organization; as a condition of that contract, many members of the cast and crew were baptized in a Beverly Hills swimming pool. TCM also notes that producers J. Edward Reynolds and Hugh Thomas Jr. appear in the finished film as gravediggers, and that the working title Grave Robbers from Outer Space was considered blasphemous by the film's Baptist financiers.

=== Criswell's introduction ===
Criswell's opening narration

The film opens with an introduction by Wood's friend, psychic Criswell: "Greetings, my friend. We are all interested in the future, for that is where you and I are going to spend the rest of our lives." (This line appears in the narration for General Motors' "Futurama" ride and its accompanying film, To New Horizons, which were part of the 1939 New York World's Fair—years before Criswell's television program.) At the time of filming, Criswell was the star of the KLAC Channel 13 (now KCOP-13) television series Criswell Predicts. The introduction could be an allusion to the opening lines of his show (a Criswell Predicts title card appears at the start of the scene), but since no episodes of the television show are known to survive, a comparison is impossible. Craig suggests that Criswell's public persona was based on the style of a charismatic preacher, perhaps influenced by early televangelists. He addresses the viewer repeatedly as "my friend", as if attempting to establish a bond between the speaker and the audience. The line likely derives from his show, and would not be out of place in a segment where a televangelist addresses his congregation. Another phrase of the introduction, "Future events such as these will affect you in the future", was a signature line for Criswell. He used it repeatedly in his newspaper and magazine columns, and probably his show.

Another line asserts that the audience is interested in "the unknown, the mysterious, the unexplainable", implying that the film's audience will have a fascination with the paranormal. The narrator claims that "we" (the filmmakers) are bringing to light the full story and evidence of fateful events, based on the survivors' "secret testimony". The narration seems to emulate the style of sensational headlines in tabloid newspapers, and promises audiences access to "lurid secrets" as if following the example of True Confessions and similar scandal magazines. The notion that a film or show could be based on true incidents and testimony would be familiar to a 1950s audience, because it was used in contemporary police procedurals such as Dragnet.

Changing the tone, Criswell delivers the sermon-like lines: "Let us punish the guilty! Let us reward the innocent!". The introduction concludes with the question: "Can your heart stand the shocking facts about graverobbers from outer space?" The latter phrase was the original title of the film, but the rest of the line again seems to emulate the sensationalist press.

The film's postscript, also narrated by Criswell and delivered in the same tone as the introduction, provides the audience with a challenge ("you have seen this incident based on sworn testimony. Can you prove it didn't happen"?), a warning ("Many scientists believe that another world is watching us this moment"), and concluding wish ("God help us...in the future".)

=== Themes ===
Through Jeff's initial conversation with his wife, the film introduces the notion of a government and military conspiracy to cover up information on documented UFO sightings. This notion was clearly influenced by the emergence and increased popularity of a UFO conspiracy theory. But the implications for the public's distrust of the government were atypical for a 1950s American film. Anti-statist ideas became more popular in the 1960s, when the subject became "safe" for mainstream cinema to explore. In this area, the film was ahead of its time.

Plan 9 from Outer Space also contains a cautionary message, delivered by the aliens. The earliest use of this concept in film was probably in The Day the Earth Stood Still (1951), and it had since seen frequent use in science fiction films. The idea was that humanity's self-destructive behavior was the real threat, not any external source of danger.

=== Connection to other films by Wood ===
Plan 9 from Outer Space has been considered a sequel to Wood's earlier film, Bride of the Monster, due to the fact that Paul Marco's policeman character, named Kelton, appears in both films. "Kelton" also appears in Wood's follow-up film, Night of the Ghouls, along with other characters from Bride of the Monster. The three films can thus be characterized as inhabiting the same cinematic universe, and as a unit have been referred to as the "Kelton Trilogy".

=== Production details and special effects ===
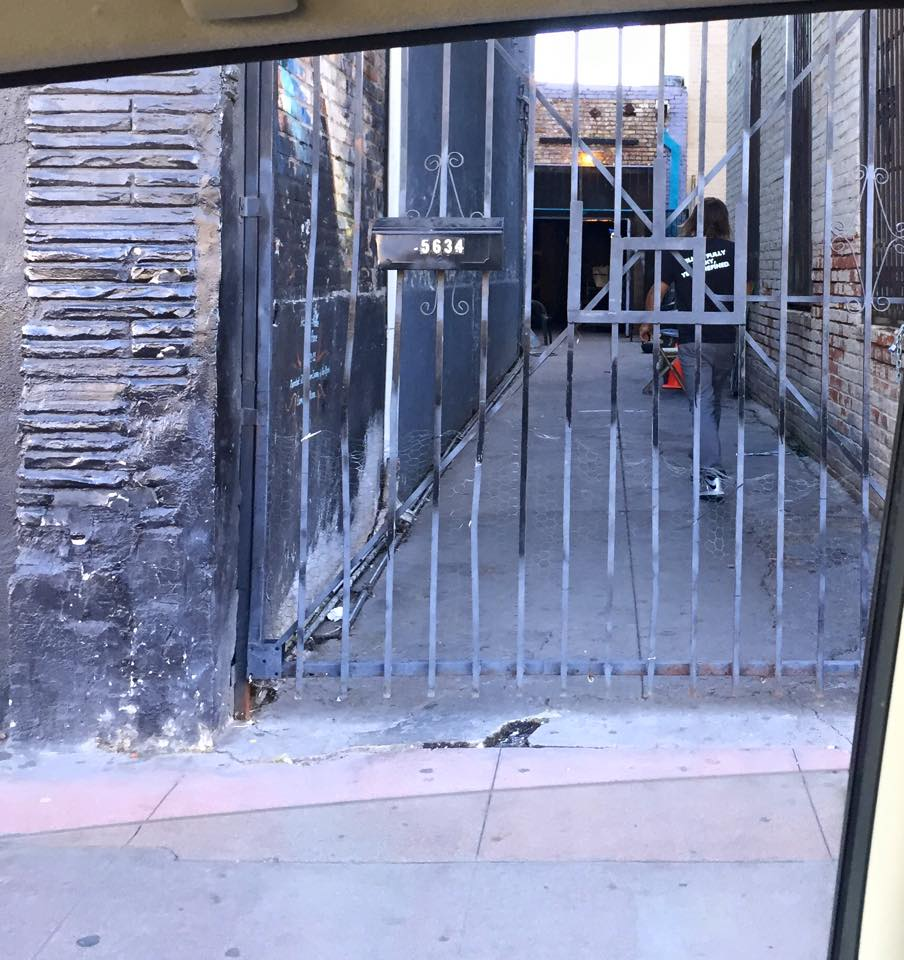
Quality Studios, where much of Plan 9 was filmed, as it appeared decades later in 2015

The film's "iconic" flying saucers have been variously identified as paper plates or hubcaps. But according to the documentary Flying Saucers Over Hollywood, The Plan 9 Companion (1992), they were actually a recognizable plastic model kit, first issued in 1952 by toy manufacturer Paul Lindberg's Lindberg Line model kit company: this was the first science fiction plastic model kit produced (product #517). Roughly matching the era's popular image of UFOs, the saucer model was disk-shaped with a clear dome on top. Under the kit dome was a little green alien pilot. This pilot figure was not used in the film. Its multiple flying saucers were painted metallic silver, including the domes. Two slightly modified versions of the Lindberg kit are used in Plan 9's UFO scenes.

Footage of Los Angeles is used to ground the otherworldly events in a realistic setting. As a resident, Wood was likely familiar with the shooting locations. The scene where the military fires at the flying saucers is actual military stock footage. The Pentagon office depicted includes a U.S. map with the sign of the Atchison, Topeka & Santa Fe Railroad; the same map appears in Baghdad After Midnight (1954), also filmed at Quality Studios; it was probably a Quality Studios background prop.

Harry Thomas, the film's makeup man, was incensed when Wood refused to follow his suggestions for the aliens' appearance. Thomas had created some rubber chin appliances to elongate their faces, as well as "cat's eyes" contact lenses and green wigs to lend them a more unearthly appearance. But Wood told him they did not have enough time for Thomas's suggestions, which led Thomas to withdraw his name from the film's credits. "I was really mad at Wood", he said years later in interviews.

The male alien Eros is apparently named after Eros, the Greek god of love. Craig suggests that the female alien's name, Tanna, invokes the name of another Greek deity: Thanatos, god of death.

In his posthumously published autobiography, Hollywood Rat Race (1998), Wood described the inclusion of the Solaronite bomb in the film's storyline as thus: "We had been shooting eight days on a twelve-day schedule before I came up with the ending. After all, in the screenplay I had already given my audience spaceships, a space war, weird people, supersonic grave robbers, and the destruction of Hollywood. Where was the topper? Kathy and I found one, and that's where the Solarnite Bomb came into being[...] Not a cliff hanger, which all action stories should have, but the final topper, which is greater than all the others."

=== Bela Lugosi's last film ===
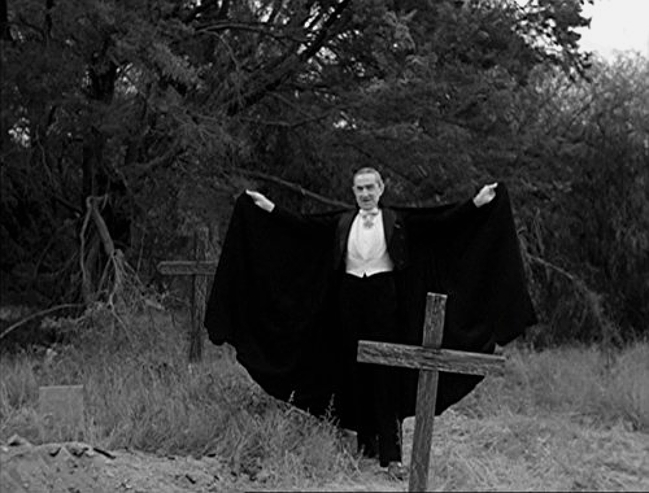
Bela Lugosi, in silent footage for the abandoned The Vampire's Tomb, which was later recycled for Plan 9 from Outer Space

Shortly before Lugosi's death in August 1956, he had been working with Wood on a handful of half-realized projects, variously titled The Vampire's Tomb or The Ghoul Goes West. Some scenes connected to these projects had been shot. They featured Lugosi weeping at a funeral, picking a rose from a bush in front of Tor Johnson's house in the daytime, walking in and out of the Johnson home's side door at nighttime, and a daylight scene, on a patch of highway, with Lugosi stalking toward the camera and dramatically spreading his Dracula cape before furling it around himself, then walking back the way he came. According to the documentary Flying Saucers: The "Plan 9" Companion, these shots were all improvised. Only the first two had reached any level of completion. When Lugosi died, Wood shelved the projects.

Wood first planned to make Lugosi the grandfather of Paula Trent, the film's lead female character, with Vampira being the revived corpse of Paula's grandmother, which explains why Lugosi returns to Paula's house after death, enters her bedroom, follows her into the cemetery, and winds up skeletonized on her patio. At the beginning of the film, Lugosi picks a rose from a bush in the front yard of the house where the Trents live (Tor Johnson's house in real life), their patio being in the backyard, and the cemetery being next door. But Wood later decided to reduce Lugosi's character's importance, making him unconnected to Paula Trent.

== Casting ==
Ed Wood described the cast of his film as "the best I ever had".

TV personality Vampira (Maila Nurmi) was second-billed below Lugosi in the posters and advertising. She recalled that Paul Marco paid her $200 to act as a vampire in the film. She recalled insisting that her part be silent, as she did not like the dialogue Wood had written for her. This recollection might be inaccurate since the zombie undead of the film are generally mute. She gave the film a "regal presence" and theatrical mannerisms. Her performance is reminiscent of a silent film actress; she credited Theda Bara as her main influence.

Veteran character actor Lyle Talbot, billed third, first met Wood when they were both working at Universal Pictures—Wood was an ambitious production assistant who called Talbot his favorite actor, and Wood promised that someday they would make movies together. "Well, two or three years later I got a call from this Eddie Wood," Talbot remembered. I'd forgotten who he was, but he told me he had this film he was making, and he had a great part for me." (The picture was Glen or Glenda?, the first of three Ed Wood features in which Talbot appeared.) Talbot agreed to work for $300 per day, and he recalled that Wood would be out scrambling for the money so he could pay Talbot in cash at the end of each shooting day. "I always got a stack of singles, maybe some fives in there, and they were all sort of wrinkled, as if he'd gathered them in small amounts and stuffed them into his pockets." Talbot had vivid memories of the Plan 9 shoot: "On Plan 9 our studio -- what a name to call it! -- was down an alley off of Santa Monica Boulevard, and it was behind a four-story hotel that mostly housed prostitutes. It was this wooden shack -- maybe it had been a garage or something. It certainly wasn't soundproofed. The lights were on little music stands and they were literally tin cans with a bulb in them."

Former cowboy star Tom Keene was still working in pictures at the time. After he stopped starring in westerns in 1943, he worked steadily as a character actor under the name Richard Powers. Wood insisted on billing him as the better-known Tom Keene.

Lynn Lemon, who plays an unnamed minister, was one of the Baptists variously involved in the production of the film. J. Edward Reynolds was a leader of the Southern Baptist Convention in Beverly Hills, California, and Hugh Thomas was one of his associates from the church; both play gravediggers, and Reynolds was also the film's executive producer. At the time of the film's creation, David De Mering was the personal secretary and alleged lover of fellow cast member Bunny Breckinridge; his inclusion in the cast was probably a result of this association.

== Music ==
The music for Plan 9 from Outer Space was compiled by Gordon Zahler. Zahler had taken over the stock-music library of his late father Lee Zahler; these mood-music tracks for every occasion had been used frequently in feature films, westerns, and serials. Zahler also owned stock recordings of works by about a dozen composers. The Zahler library was often consulted by producers of low-budget films and television programs; however, Gordon Zahler never reliably sourced and credited the Plan 9 score. In 1996, Paul Mandell produced a CD that recreated the film's score by tracking down the stock recordings and the composers, and wrote an article about it for Film Score Monthly. Some websites give proper credit to these composers.

In 1996, Paul Mandell produced a CD that recreated the film's musical score; the CD was released by the now-defunct Retrosonic Corp.

== Release ==
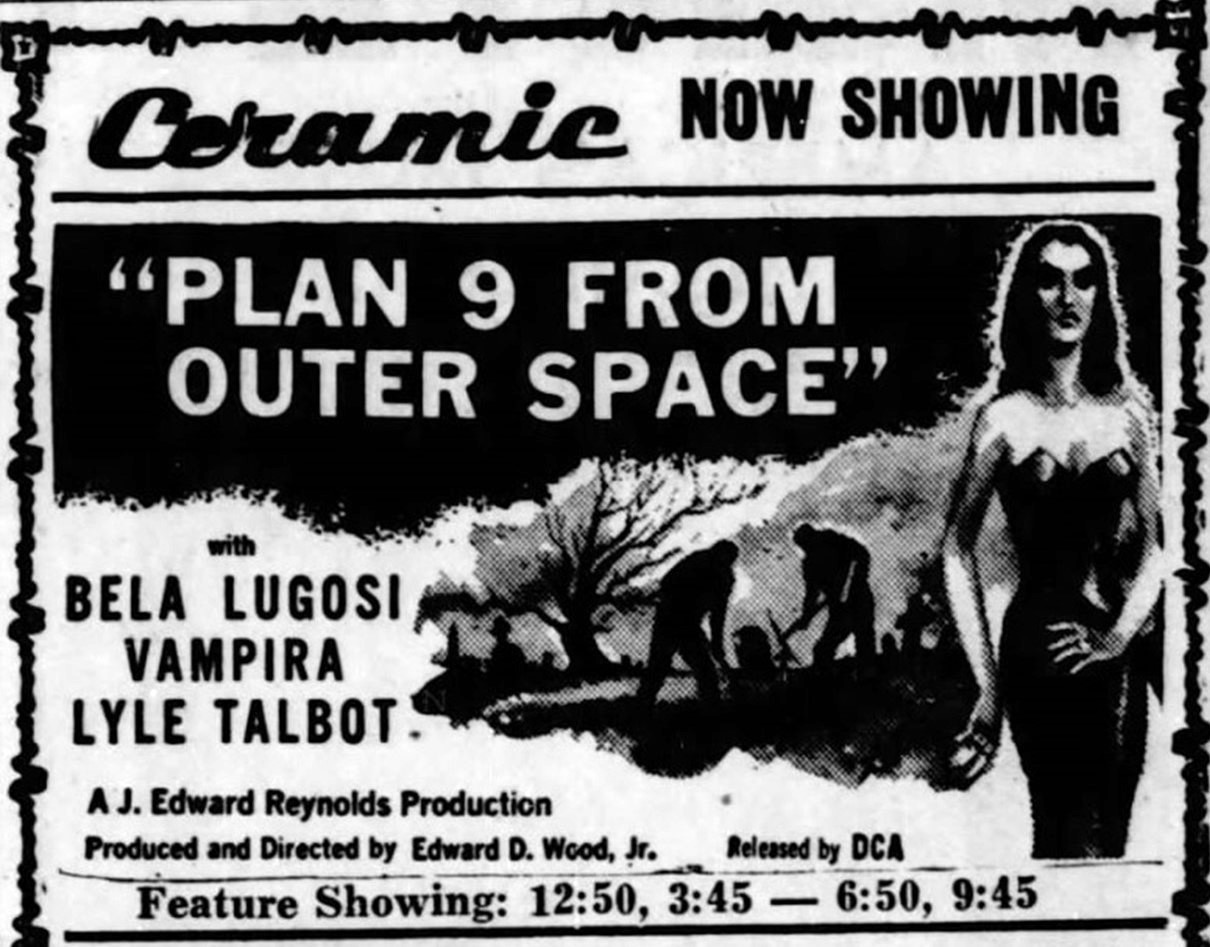
Theatrical advertisement from 1958

Plan 9 from Outer Space was shot in November 1956 (under the shooting title Grave Robbers from Outer Space) and premiered on March 15, 1957, at the Carlton Theatre in Los Angeles. The original shooting title is mentioned at the end of Criswell's opening narration when he asks the audience: "Can your heart stand the shocking facts about grave robbers from outer space?" It is thought that Wood changed the title because he did not want his backers to know that the film was being distributed in the South. (By 1958, the film's backers had given up all hope of seeing a return on their investment.) But the new title was less indicative of the film's content and may have contributed to its distribution problems; Wood could not find a distributor until early 1958.

== Reception ==
Distributors Corporation of America (DCA) was a subsidiary of the Walter Reade Organisation, a British-based firm catering to art houses; the American counterpart DCA specialized in cheap exploitation quickies for drive-ins. DCA released Plan 9 from Outer Space nationally in July 1958. In its time, the film served its purpose as a suitable offering for juvenile audiences at theaters and drive-ins. The trade paper The Exhibitor didn't consider it bad at all, calling it an "okay science-fiction programmer". In many situations it did very respectable business in theaters; in Minneapolis Plan 9 played at the RKO Pantages as a companion to the Alan Freed musical Go, Johnny, Go!, and Variety noted that the show, intended "for kids and teenagers", earned a "tall $6,500" for the week. For comparison, in the same city the Frank Sinatra–Frank Capra film A Hole in the Head earned $6,000, and the Alfred Hitchcock thriller North by Northwest earned $7,000, so Plan 9 was just as successful as these major productions.

Plan 9 was sometimes screened as part of a double feature. In Chicago, it was first seen alongside another DCA release, the British thriller Time Lock (1957), a film mostly remembered as an early credit for Sean Connery. It was later used as a companion feature for double-feature screenings of The Trap (1959), a film noir starring Richard Widmark. In Texas, it was seen alongside Devil Girl From Mars (1954), a reissued British science fiction film. Plan 9 premiered in many cities during 1959 (through DCA) and was still playing into 1960 (though DCA's successor, Valiant Pictures).

In 1961 the picture was sold to television and was shown on Chiller Theatre and similar venues for years.

== Accidental notoriety ==
Plan 9 from Outer Space gained notoriety through the Medveds' book because of its multiple continuity problems and apparently ridiculous inclusion of props not meant to be seen.

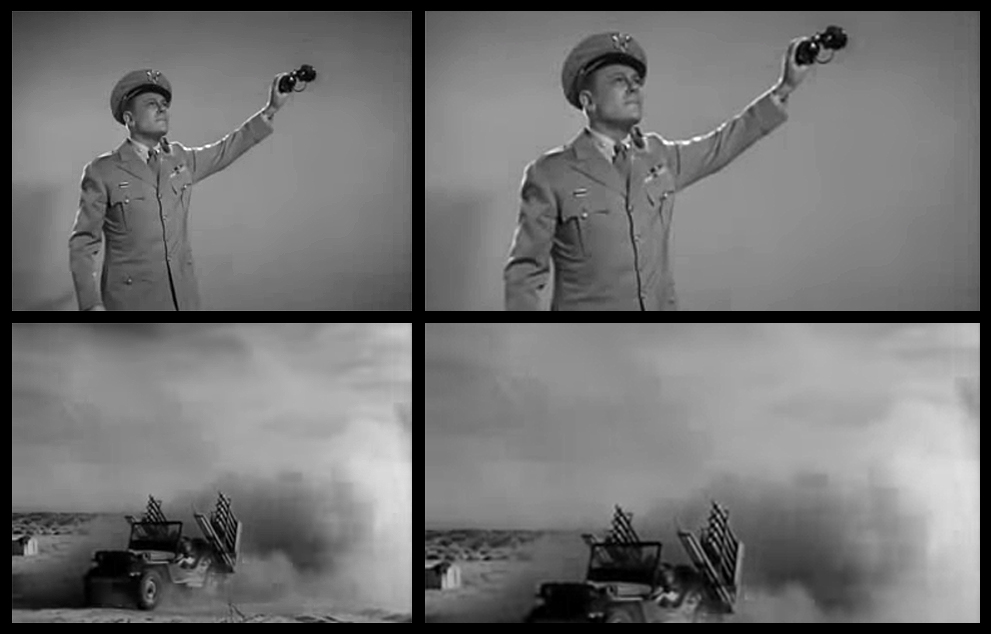
Two adjoining shots, in open matte and 1.85:1. The top image was composed for widescreen, the bottom is military stock footage that was not.

Plan 9 was photographed in the 1.85:1 widescreen ratio, which by 1957 had become the common theatrical format alongside CinemaScope. Wood composed his shots so that the performers were always within the widescreen frame, but anything outside the frame—random props, boom microphones, edges of sets—would be cropped off the screen in projection. However, when the film was first shown on television and later home video, the 1.33:1 full-frame image revealed all the stray matter at the top and bottom of the frame that Wood took pains to hide. This gave viewers the false impression that Wood was hilariously inept in framing his shots.

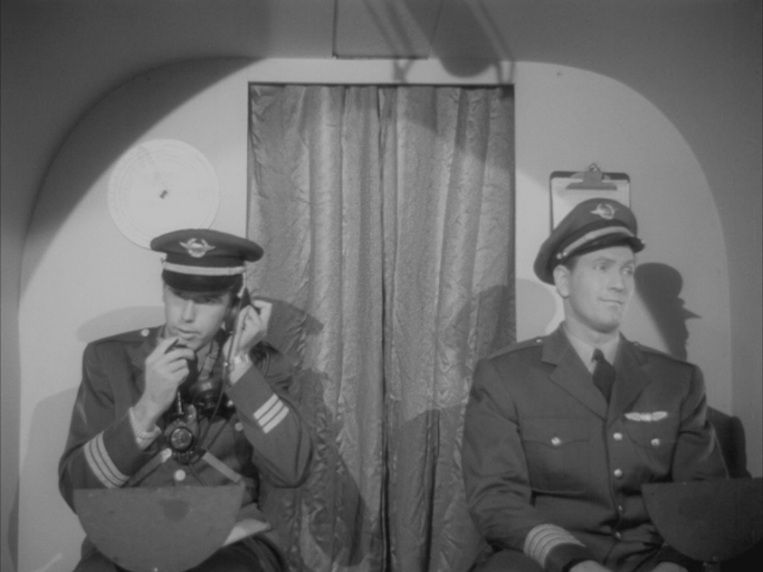
A visible shadow of the boom microphone (center of photo's upper edge) in a cockpit scene, while the script can be slightly seen on Trent's lap

During the first aircraft cockpit scene, the first officer is reading from a script in his lap, and a flash of light from a flying saucer reveals the boom microphone's shadow. The microphone and the script were not visible in the original theatrical release, which cropped off anything outside the widescreen frame. These mistakes are noticeable only in the Plan 9 full-frame film prints, TV releases, and video transfers.

Another problem arose when Wood incorporated stock footage in full-frame 1.33:1 (including his own footage of Lugosi), which becomes overly cropped when shown in widescreen. Turner Classic Movies has since presented a high-definition transfer of the film in the original 1.85:1 ratio. The stock footage shots in this version have been slightly adjusted to better fit the frame.

== Legacy ==
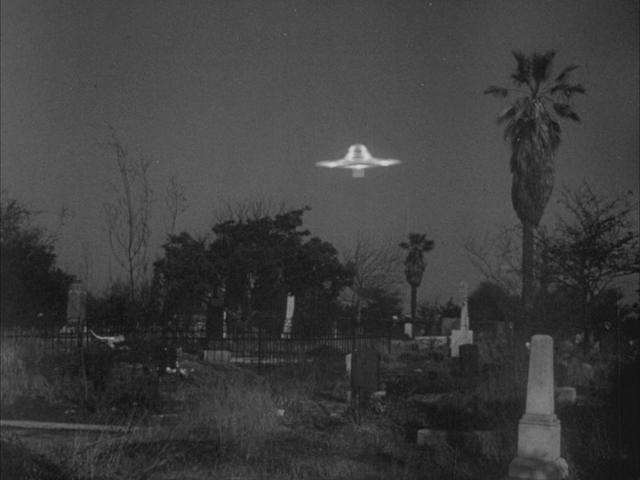
A flying saucer above the graveyard. Plan 9's special effects have been called "hilarious".

Some critics, including Michael Medved, consider Plan 9 from Outer Space the worst film in the history of cinema. However, others have rated the film more positively; many of them say the film is simply too amusing to be considered the worst film ever made, and that its ineptitude adds to its charm.

On review aggregator Rotten Tomatoes, the film holds an approval rating of 66% based on 38 reviews, with an average score of 5.70/10. The website's critical consensus reads, "The epitome of so-bad-it's-good cinema, Plan 9 from Outer Space is an unintentionally hilarious sci-fi 'thriller' from anti-genius Ed Wood that is justly celebrated for its staggering ineptitude." On Metacritic, the film received a score of 56 based on 13 reviews, indicating "mixed or average reviews".

Josiah Teal of Film Threat gave the film a 10/10, calling it a "quintessential cult classic" and writing that it is a "testament to a love of cinema and making all the wrong creative choices." There are also claims that Wood managed to convey some interesting ideas. The Encyclopedia of Science Fiction, for instance, claims that "the film's reception modulated away from jovial mockery of its wanton indifference to normal professional standards of script, performance, and effects, in favour of a more nuanced appreciation of its dreamlike narrative assemblage of genre tropes, resonantly unspeakable dialogue, and irrepressible budgetary ingenuity."

Leonard Maltin classified it as a "BOMB" in his Movie Guide: "So mesmerizingly awful it actually improves (so to speak) with each viewing." In 2024, Marya E. Gates of Inverse called the film "a low-budget wonder. Although the final product is sometimes hampered by its budget, it's hard to resist its ambitious thematic scope, peculiar vision, and melancholic charm. It's not so bad it's good. It's just good."

=== Views of cast members ===
Lyle Talbot defended Ed Wood in later years: "Eddie was serious about his movie. He wanted to keep making them and he wanted to improve. And that's why I don't think you can ridicule the poor little guy."

Lead actor Gregory Walcott, who admired Ed Wood's tenacity in his projects, still had some bad opinions of Plan 9. He said years later, "Ed had poor taste and was undisciplined. If he had ten million dollars, [Plan 9] would still have been a piece of tasteless shit. I liked Ed Wood but I could discern no genius there. His main concern was making his next film. It looked like they shot the thing in a kitchen....worst film of all time. Thirty years later, it's come back to haunt me." For a long time Walcott considered his association with Plan 9 a source of embarrassment. He eventually acknowledged the film's appeal and, in 2000, conducted an audience Q&A at a screening.

Vampira years later recalled: "I didn't have a decent costume for Plan 9. What I wore was old, worn out. It looks like I had a hole in the crotch of the dress, if you notice....But I thought, 'oh well, nobody's ever gonna see this movie, so it doesn't matter'."

=== In popular culture ===
The film's title was the inspiration for the name of Bell Labs' successor to the Unix operating system. Plan 9 from Bell Labs was developed over several years starting in the mid-1980s and released to the general public in 1995.

Wood's career is depicted in the 1994 film Ed Wood, produced and directed by Tim Burton and starring Johnny Depp as Wood and Martin Landau as Lugosi. In its final part, Burton's film focuses on the filming of Plan 9, ending with that film's premiere. Though not a commercial success, Burton's film received critical acclaim and won two Academy Awards: Best Supporting Actor for Martin Landau and Best Makeup for Rick Baker, who designed Landau's prosthetic makeup, Ve Neill and Yolanda Toussieng.

In connection with the Planet Nine hypothesis, the film's title found its way into academic discourse. In 2016, an article titled Planet Nine from Outer Space about the hypothesized planet in the outer region of the Solar System was published in Scientific American. Several conference talks since then have used the same word play, as did a 2019 lecture by Mike Brown.

The film has also remained visible through repertory and comedy-commentary screenings. In 2008, the RiffTrax performers Michael J. Nelson, Kevin Murphy, and Bill Corbett, all associated with Mystery Science Theater 3000, performed live commentary over Plan 9 from Outer Space at the Aero Theater in Santa Monica as part of a San Francisco Sketchfest presentation. The following year, RiffTrax presented a nationwide one-night live event built around the film, broadcast from the Belcourt Theatre in Nashville to more than 430 movie theaters in the United States.

The film has also continued to appear in archival and repertory contexts. The British Film Institute screened Plan 9 from Outer Space from a new 35 mm print made from original elements by the BFI National Archive, presenting it as part of a season devoted to unusual and transgressive cinema.

== See also ==
- Ed Wood filmography
- List of American films of 1959
- List of cult films
- List of films featuring extraterrestrials
- List of 20th-century films considered the worst
