= Lists of films considered the worst =

Lists of films considered the worst include:

- List of 20th-century films considered the worst
- List of 21st-century films considered the worst

== See also ==
- List of films with a 0% rating on Rotten Tomatoes
- List of biggest box-office bombs
