= List of horror films of 1964 =

A list of horror films released in 1964.

Horror films released in 1964
Title	Director	Cast	Country	Notes
2000 Maniacs	Herschell Gordon Lewis	Connie Mason, Shelby Livingston, Michael Korb	United States	
At Midnight I'll Take Your Soul	José Mojica Marins	José Mojica Marins, Magda Mei, Nivaldo Lima	Brazil	
The Black Torment	Robert Hartford-Davis	Heather Sears, John Turner, Ann Lynn	United Kingdom	
Blood and Black Lace	Mario Bava	Eva Bartok, Cameron Mitchell, Thomas Reiner	Italy; France; West Germany	
Castle of Blood (aka Danza Macabre)	Antonio Margheriti, Sergio Corbucci	Georges Rivière, Barbara Steele	Italy; France	
Castle of the Living Dead	Warren Kiefer	Christopher Lee, Gaia Germani, Philippe Leroy	Italy; France	
Cave of the Living Dead	Akos von Ratony	Wolfgang Preiss, Adrian Hoven, Carl Möhner, Erika Remberg	West Germany; Yugoslavia	
Cien Gritos de Terror (100 Cries of Terror)	Ramón Obon	Joaquín Cordero, Ariadne Welter, Ofelia Montesco	United States	
The Creeping Terror	Art J. Nelson	Arthur Nelson, Shannon O'Neil, William Thourlby	United States	
The Curse of the Living Corpse	Del Tenney	Helen Warren, Roy Scheider, Margot Hartman	United States	
The Curse of the Mummy's Tomb	Michael Carreras	Terence Morgan, Ronald Howard, Fred Clark	United Kingdom	
Devil Doll	Lindsay Shonteff	Bryant Halliday, William Sylvester, Yvonne Romain	United Kingdom; United States	
Dr. Orloff's Monster (aka The Secret of Dr. Orloff)	Jesús Franco	Hugo Blanco, Agnès Spaak, Perla Cristal	Austria; Spain	
Dungeon of Harrow	Pat Boyette	Eunice Grey, Helen Hogan, Michele Buquor	United States	
The Earth Dies Screaming	Terence Fisher	Willard Parker, Virginia Field, Dennis Price	United Kingdom	
The Evil of Frankenstein	Freddie Francis	Peter Cushing, Peter Woodthorpe, Duncan Lamont, Sandor Eles	United Kingdom	
Face of the Screaming Werewolf (re-edited version of La Casa del Terror)	Jerry Warren	Lon Chaney, Donald Barron, Yolanda Varela	United States	
The Flesh Eaters	Jack Curtis	Byron Sanders, Ray Tudor	United States	
The Gorgon	Terence Fisher	Peter Cushing, Christopher Lee, Richard Pasco	United Kingdom	
The Horror of It All	Terence Fisher	Pat Boone, Erica Rogers	United Kingdom	
The Horror of Party Beach	Del Tenney	Augustin Mayer, Eulabelle Moore, John Scott	United States	
Hush...Hush, Sweet Charlotte	Robert Aldrich	Bette Davis, Olivia de Havilland, Joseph Cotten, Agnes Moorehead, Cecil Kellaway, Mary Astor	United States	
I Eat Your Skin	Del Tenney	Heather Hewitt, William Joyce	United States	
The Incredibly Strange Creatures Who Stopped Living and Became Mixed-Up Zombies	Ray Dennis Steckler	Cash Flagg, Brett O'Hara, Carolyn Brandt, Atlas King	United States	
Kwaidan	Masaki Kobayashi	Rentarō Mikuni, Michiyo Aratama, Misako Watanabe	Japan	Costume horror
Lady in a Cage	Walter Grauman	Olivia de Havilland, James Caan	United States	
The Last Man on Earth	Ubaldo Ragona, Sidney Salkow	Vincent Price, Giacomo Rossi-Stuart, Tony Cerevi	Italy; United States	
The Long Hair of Death	Antonio Margheriti	Barbara Steele, George Ardisson, Halina Zalewska	Italy	
Las Luchadoras contra la Momia (The Wrestling Women vs the Aztec Mummy)	René Cardona	Lorena Velázquez, Elisabeth Campbell, Armando Silvestre	Mexico	
The Masque of the Red Death	Roger Corman	Vincent Price, Hazel Court, Jane Asher	United Kingdom; United States	
Monstrosity (a.k.a. The Atomic Brain)	Joseph Mascelli	Frank Gerstle, Erika Peters	United States	
The Night Walker	William Castle	Barbara Stanwyck, Robert Taylor, Hayden Rorke	United States	
Onibaba	Kaneto Shindo	Nobuko Otowa, Jitsuko Yoshimura, Kei Satō	Japan	
Pyro... The Thing Without a Face	Julio Coll	Barry Sullivan, Martha Hyer	Spain; United States	
Strait-Jacket	William Castle	Joan Crawford, Diane Baker, Leif Erickson	United States	
Terror in the Crypt	Camillo Mastrocinque	Adriana Ambessi, Christopher Lee, Pier Ana Quaglia	Italy; Spain	
The Tomb of Ligeia	Roger Corman	Vincent Price, Elizabeth Shepherd, John Westbrook	United Kingdom; United States	
War of the Zombies (a.k.a. Rome Against Rome)	Giuseppe Vari	John Drew Barrymore, Susy Andersen, Ettore Manni	Italy	
Witchcraft	Don Sharp	Lon Chaney Jr., Jack Hedley, Jill Dixon	United Kingdom	

== Citations ==
- Bradley, Matthew R. (2010). Richard Matheson on Screen: A History of the Filmed Works. McFarland. ISBN 978-0-7864-4216-4.
- Chibnal, Steve (2002). British Horror Cinema. Routledge. ISBN 978-0-415-23004-9.
- Curti, Roberto (2015). Italian Gothic Horror Films, 1957–1969. McFarland. ISBN 978-1-4766-1989-7.
- Hardy, Phil, ed. (1995). The Overlook Film Encyclopedia. Vol. 3. Overlook Press. ISBN 978-0-87951-624-6.
- Krafsur, Richard P., ed. (1997). The American Film Institute Catalog of Motion Pictures Produced in the United States: Feature Films, 1961–1970, Part 2. University of California Press. ISBN 978-0-520-20970-1.
- Young, R. G. (2000). The Encyclopedia of Fantastic Film: Ali Baba to Zombies. Hal Leonard Corporation. ISBN 978-1-55783-269-6.
