= Ron Haydock =

American musician (1940–1977)

- Ron Haydock (right) in 1962, with film editor Bob Burns III and author/historian Jim Harmon
- Born: April 17, 1940; Chicago, Illinois, United States
- Died: August 14, 1977 (aged 37); Victorville, California, United States
- Occupations: Writer, musician, actor, film writer

Ron Haydock (April 17, 1940 – August 14, 1977) was an American actor, screenwriter, novelist and rock musician.

== Career ==
Haydock's band, Ron Haydock and the Boppers, were heavily influenced by Gene Vincent. In August 1959, Cha Cha Records released their debut single, "99 Chicks"/"Be-Bop-A Jean." These tunes and 26 other tracks were reissued by Norton Records on the 1996 CD 99 Chicks; the album was released on vinyl in 2005.

In the Hollywood B-movie industry, Haydock was an actor and screenwriter, working with director Ray Dennis Steckler. He also worked as a magazine editor. Haydock used a variety of pseudonyms, including Arnold Hayes, Lonnie Lord, Vin Saxon, Don Sheppard and Jerry Lee Vincent. As Vin Saxon, he was the author of adult fiction paperbacks during the 1960s. As Arnold Hayes, he wrote graphic stories for Warren Publishing. Haydock was allegedly responsible for discovering actor Edgar Aghassi and setting him on a career in cult horror films.

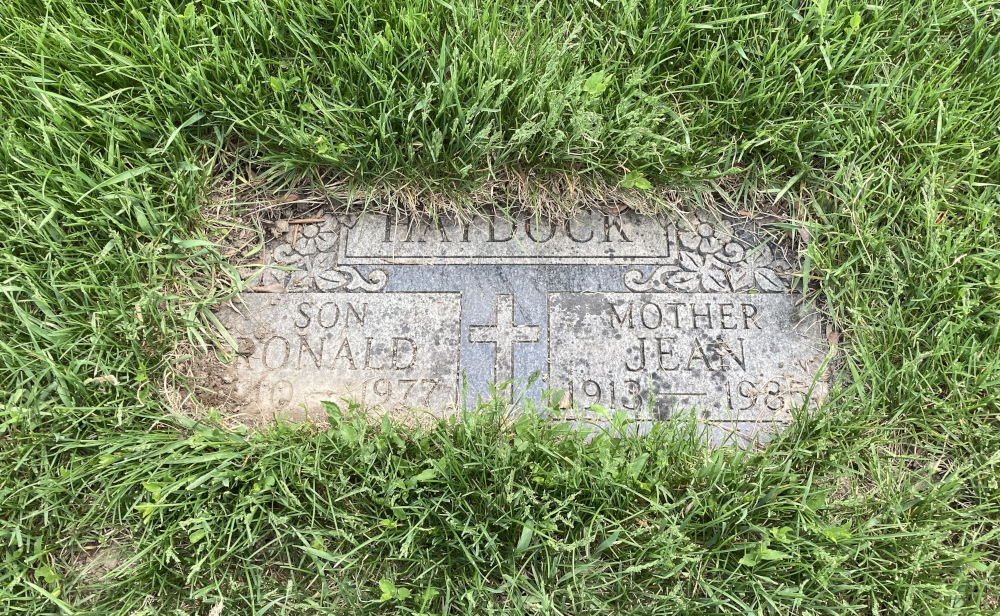
Haydock's grave at Resurrection Catholic Cemetery

In 1966, Haydock, suffering from depression, moved back to Chicago. In 1967, he recorded some acoustic demos, including "Rock Man", with lyrics about Gene Vincent, which was made as a tribute. Through the 1970s he kept writing novels and comics, and continued acting.

On August 14, 1977, Haydock was struck and killed by a truck driver while hitchhiking after visiting Steckler in Las Vegas; he was 37. He was buried at Resurrection Catholic Cemetery in Justice, Illinois.

Norton Records' Miriam Linna has written extensively about Haydock for liner notes, magazine articles and the book Sin-A-Rama (2004).

== Filmography ==
- Terror in the Snow (1973, never completed) co-starred Edgar Aghassi
- Blood Shack (1971) .... Tim
- Body Fever (1969) .... Fritz, the photographer
- Rat Pfink a Boo Boo (1966) (as Vin Saxon) .... Lonnie Lord/Rat Pfink
- Lemon Grove Kids Meet the Monsters (1965)
- The Thrill Killers (1964) (as Tim)

== Bibliography ==
=== As Vin Saxon ===
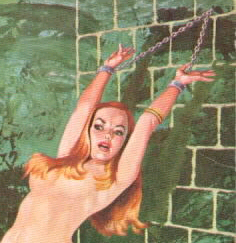
"Pagan Urge" cover art (modified to remove further innuendo)

- Pagan Urge - 1963 (reissued as God of Lust)
- I Want to Sin - 1964
- Six For Sex - 1964
- Ape Rape - 1964 (reissued in 1967 as Caged Lust) - co-written w/ Jim Harmon
- Erotic Executives - 1964
- Perverted Lust - 1964
- Unnatural Desires - 1965
- Whisper of Silk - 1966
- Sex-a-Reenos - 1966
- Pagan Lesbians - 1966
- Animal Lust - 1969

=== As Don Sheppard ===
- The Flesh Peddlers – 1962 - plotted by Jim Harmon
