= The Last Drive-in with Joe Bob Briggs =

Television series

- Genre: Variety; Horror; Comedy
- Created by: Joe Bob Briggs; Austin Jennings; Matt Manjourides
- Directed by: Austin Jennings
- Presented by: Joe Bob Briggs; Diana Prince
- Theme music composer: John Brennan
- Opening theme: "Joe Bob Is Back in Town"
- Ending theme: "The Drive-in Oath"
- Country of origin: United States
- Original language: English
- No. of seasons: 7
- No. of episodes: 72 (and 34 specials) (list of episodes)

Production
- Executive producers: Matt Manjourides; Justin Martell; Joe Bob Briggs
- Cinematography: Kevin Quigley
- Editor: Crystal House
- Production companies: Not the Funeral Home, LLC

Original release
- Network: Shudder
- Release: July 13, 2018 – present

Related
- MonsterVision

The Last Drive-in with Joe Bob Briggs is an American variety television series created by Joe Bob Briggs, Austin Jennings, and Matt Manjourides for Shudder.

Briggs was known for hosting Joe Bob's Drive-in Theater and MonsterVision, and so Shudder decided to have him host a standalone marathon of horror movies of his choosing. The positive reception exceeded their expectations, resulting in a continued partnership.

The show follows Briggs as he hosts one or more films alongside Darcy the Mail Girl (former adult actress, Diana Prince), with cameos by production designer Yuki Nakamura, music supervisor John Brennan, and the occasional guest. The hosted segments include Briggs' "Drive-in Totals," as well as fun facts, rants, singing, comedy, interviews, awards, and performances.

== Production ==
Over 17 years after the cancellation of MonsterVision, Joe Bob Briggs tweeted that Shudder had shown interest in reviving the series. An official announcement was made on June 25, 2018, that Briggs would be returning in a 24-hour marathon for the Shudder TV live feed. On July 13, Shudder aired The Last Drive-in with Joe Bob Briggs ("July 2018 Marathon"), featuring Tourist Trap, Sleepaway Camp, Rabid (1977), The Prowler, Sorority Babes in the Slimeball Bowl-O-Rama, Daughters of Darkness, Blood Feast, Basket Case, Re-Animator, Demons (1985), The Legend of Boggy Creek, Hellraiser, and Pieces. The movies contained several interruptions for Briggs's "Drive-in Totals," insider stories, and rants. These segments also included Darcy the Mail Girl (Diana Prince), who showed up in movie-themed outfits to banter with Briggs and brought messages from fans, as well as live-tweeted with viewers. The show's guests were Felissa Rose from Sleepaway Camp and Lyle Blackburn for The Legend of Boggy Creek.

Following the success of the "July 2018 Marathon," on September 5, 2018, Shudder announced the decision to greenlight two more specials for 2018 and a regular series beginning in 2019. For Thanksgiving, Briggs hosted "Joe Bob's Dinners of Death" on November 22, 2018, cementing the shows format. Featured movies included The Texas Chain Saw Massacre (1974), The Hills Have Eyes (1977), Dead or Alive (1999), and Blood Rage, with special guest Michael Berryman, who played Pluto in the second film, and a phone call with "mangled dick expert" Felissa Rose. Next, Briggs hosted "A Very Joe Bob Christmas" on December 21, 2018, which was centered around Phantasm, Phantasm III: Lord of the Dead, Phantasm IV: Oblivion, and Phantasm: Ravager. Guests included franchise hero Reggie Bannister and Phantasm: Ravager special effects makeup coordinator Gigi Bannister. On February 28, 2019, Shudder announced that The Last Drive-in with Joe Bob Briggs series would formally premiere on March 29, 2019, consisting of nine weekly double features live every Friday night. The first episode premiered with C.H.U.D. and Castle Freak (1995), alongside guests Barbara Crampton, who played Susan Reilly in Castle Freak, and Felissa Rose, the returning "mangled dick expert." On April 16, 2019, Darcy began holding weekly contests to see who could guess both films being hosted.

Ahead of the Season 1 finale, on May 22, 2019, Shudder announced their decision to renew the series for a second season. On October 7, it was announced that Briggs would return with a special titled "Joe Bob's Halloween Hootenanny" on October 25. Briggs hosted Halloween (1978), Halloween 4: The Return of Michael Myers, and Halloween 5: The Revenge of Michael Myers, with a phone call from Tom Atkins. On the day of the Halloween special, Briggs announced that on December 13, he would be hosting his next Shudder special, "Joe Bob's Red Christmas." Briggs hosted the movies Black Christmas (1974), Jack Frost (1997), and Silent Night, Deadly Night Part 2. Darcy and Briggs honored Dinosaur Dracula with the first "Silver Bolo Award."

On March 24, 2020, Briggs announced that the second season of The Last Drive-in with Joe Bob Briggs would premiere on April 24. From this point onward, seasons would consist of ten weekly double features every Friday. The premiere of Season 2 aired Chopping Mall, with guest Kelli Maroney who played Alison Parks, and Bloodsucking Freaks, with co-host Chris Jericho. Later in the second season, Darcy reinstated the MonsterVision weekly caption contest for this series. "Week 8" saw the world premiere of Hogzilla, starring Briggs, and featured Darcy listing the "Drive-in Totals."

On July 14, 2020, Shudder announced that the series would return for a third season in 2021, along with a "Summer Sleepover" double feature on August 14. Briggs and Darcy hosted Slumber Party Massacre II and Victor Crowley in their pajamas. Felissa Rose, Adam Green, Kane Hodder, Brian Quinn, and Tiffany Shepis joined them as guests for the second film. On August 20, Briggs confirmed that the next special would be held on October 23. The team hosted "Joe Bob's Halloween Hideaway," where they showed Haunt and Hack-O-Lantern from a new cabin set. On November 10, Briggs announced that there would be another special premiering on December 11, titled "Joe Bob Saves Christmas." During this special, Briggs and Darcy auctioned items for The Trevor Project, The National Women's Law Center, The Peaceful Valley Donkey Rescue, and the Organization for Autism Research on eBay, while hosting Dial Code Santa Claus and Christmas Evil.

On January 19, 2021, Briggs announced that he would be hosting a Valentine's Day special with Darcy titled "Joe Bob Put a Spell on You" on February 12. Briggs and Darcy hosted Tammy and the T-Rex followed by The Love Witch, featuring an interview with director Anna Biller. On February 23, Briggs tweeted that the third season of The Last Drive-in with Joe Bob Briggs would premiere on April 16, and would be hosted at the cabin set. Eli Roth served as the co-host for both films during the Season 3 premiere, which featured Mother's Day (1980) and The House by the Cemetery. On April 19, Shudder premiered "Just Joe Bob" on their streaming service, which features a permanent archive of Briggs' segments and commentary without the films.

On June 24, 2021, Shudder announced that The Last Drive-in with Joe Bob Briggs had been renewed for a fourth season, along with additional holiday specials. On September 1, Briggs tweeted that he would be hosting a Halloween special with Darcy titled "Joe Bob's Halloween Hoedown" on October 8. On September 8, Darcy revealed that the Silver Bolo Award was discontinued by Shudder going forward due to controversy following Ghastly Grinning turning it down during the previous season. On October 8, Briggs and Darcy hosted Angel (1984) and Terror Train for this year's October special, alongside guests David Gordon Green and Jason Blum. On October 22, Briggs and Darcy revealed that they would be hosting "The Last Drive-In: The Walking Dead" on October 29, where they would watch the first two episodes of The Walking Dead Season 1 with guests Greg Nicotero and Carey Jones. On November 17, Briggs tweeted that his team would be hosting a Christmas special titled "Joe Bob Ruins Christmas" on December 17. That night, Briggs and Darcy auctioned items for First Book, the National Coalition Against Domestic Violence, the National Greyhound Foundation, and the Appalachia Service Project, while hosting Ice Cream Man and 'Gator Bait.

On January 19, 2022, Shudder announced that Briggs and Darcy would be returning to celebrate Valentine's Day with a special titled "Joe Bob's Heartbreak Trailer Park" premiering on February 11. During the special, Briggs and Darcy hosted Black Roses (1988) alongside The Boulet Brothers, and Frakenhooker with guests Frank Henenlotter and James Lorinz. Then, on March 16, Shudder reported that the fourth season of The Last Drive-in with Joe Bob Briggs would premiere on April 29, celebrating their 100th movie on the platform. This season premiere featured Briggs and Darcy hosting their 100th film, Night of the Living Dead (1968), with guest host Svengoolie, as well as the first movie that Briggs ever reviewed on his column, Antropophagus, with guest mail girl Honey Michelle Gregory. Later, on June 30, Shudder green-lit a fifth season of the series along with additional holiday themed specials. This was followed by an announcement on August 12 that the next holiday special, "Joe Bob's Haunted Halloween Hangout," would be held on October 21. That night, Briggs and Darcy were joined by Cassandra Peterson for Elvira's Haunted Hills, as well as Jill Schoelen for Popcorn (1991). On November 17, it was revealed the Briggs and Darcy would be returning for a Christmas special titled "Joe Bob's Ghoultide Get-Together" on December 16.

On February 10, 2023, they aired Joe Bob's Vicious Vegas Valentine where the winners from one of the auctions from Ghoultide Get-Together were married on the show. Before the start of Season 5 it was announced that this season would be split up into two parts. Week 1-5 airing from April 21 to May 19 and Week 6-10 from June 23 to July 21. On June 15 there was an announcement made that The Last Drive-In would be hosting the premiere episode of The Walking Dead: Dead City the following Sunday, June 18. On September 1 it was announced that there would be 5 specials that would air from then until Halloween. The specials will be the 2021 Mahoning Jamboree special on September 8 (Only Night of the Demons was shown during this special, part 2 with Torso will be released later due to movie licensing rights issues), the Daryl Dixon series premiere special on September 15, a live episode from the 2023 Las Vegas Jamboree on October 7, Fearfest Takeover on AMC special featuring Halloween (1978) for its 45th anniversary on October 10 and lastly Joe Bob's Helloween which will air on October 20.

Announced on September 28, 2023, the show will return for a sixth season. In addition to specials released for Halloween, Christmas and Valentine's Day, a full season with a new format filmed at the backlot studio in Senoia, Georgia where The Walking Dead has filmed in March 2024. Thirty films are expected to be exhibited, the most of any season so far.

On August 29, 2024, it was announced that the show will return for a seventh season. On February 13 it was announced that Season 7 would premiere on March 7 with a new format of 1 double feature episode airing live on the first Friday of every month throughout the year.

On March 7, 2026, the day of the Season 7 finale, it was officially announced that it was in actuality the series finale. This caught fans by surprise as there was no indication that the show was ending up until that point. The Last Drive-In regular series was cancelled. Joe Bob announced on social media that 4 more double feature specials were commissioned by Shudder to air at future dates but after they would be parting ways with Shudder completely. A Variety interview with Joe Bob released shortly after confirmed Shudder had commissioned a Walpurgisnacht special slated for April 24, as well as Summer, Halloween and Christmas specials.

== Episodes ==
Season	Episodes	Originally released	
Season	Episodes	First released	Last released
1	9	March 29, 2019	May 24, 2019
2	10	April 24, 2020	August 14, 2020
3	10	April 16, 2021	July 18, 2021
4	10	April 29, 2022	July 1, 2022
5	10	April 21, 2023	July 21, 2023
6	11	March 29, 2024	October 25, 2024
7	12	March 7, 2025	March 6, 2026
Specials	35	July 13, 2018	December 4, 2026

=== Season 1 (2019) ===
No. overall	No. in season	Title	Original release date
1	1	"Week 1"	March 29, 2019
Movies: C.H.U.D. (1984) and Castle Freak (1995) Guest(s): Barbara Crampton (Castle Freak), Felissa Rose (Mangled Dick Expert)
2	2	"Week 2"	April 5, 2019
Movies: Q: The Winged Serpent (1982) and Society (1989)
3	3	"Week 3"	April 12, 2019
Movies: Deathgasm (2015) and The Changeling (1980) Guest(s): Felissa Rose (Mangled Dick Expert)
4	4	"Week 4"	April 19, 2019
Movies: Madman (1982) and Wolfguy: Enraged Lycanthrope (1975) Guest(s): Yuki Nakamura (Production Designer)
5	5	"Week 5"	April 26, 2019
Movies: Demon Wind (1990) and The House of the Devil (2009)
6	6	"Week 6"	May 3, 2019
Movies: WolfCop (2014) and Henry: Portrait of a Serial Killer (1986) Guest(s): Felissa Rose (Mangled Dick Expert), John McNaughton (Henry: Portrait of a Serial Killer)
7	7	"Week 7"	May 10, 2019
Movies: Contamination (1980) and A Girl Walks Home Alone at Night (2014)
8	8	"Week 8"	May 17, 2019
Movies: The Stuff (1985) and Street Trash (1987) Guest(s): Felissa Rose (Mangled Dick Expert)
9	9	"Week 9"	May 24, 2019
Movies: Blood Harvest (1987) and Hello Mary Lou: Prom Night II (1987) Guest(s): Justin Martell (Tiny Tim Biographer), Bucks Burnett (Tiny Tim's Manager)

=== Season 2 (2020) ===
No. overall	No. in season	Title	Original release date
10	1	"Week 1"	April 24, 2020
Movies: Chopping Mall (1986) and Bloodsucking Freaks (1976) Guest(s): Kelli Maroney (Chopping Mall), Chris Jericho (Bloodsucking Freaks Co-Host) Silver Bolo Award: Count Gore De Vol
11	2	"Week 2"	May 1, 2020
Movies: Maniac (1980) and Heathers (1988) Guest(s): Tom Savini (Maniac) Silver Bolo Award: The Collinsport Historical Society
12	3	"Week 3"	May 8, 2020
Movies: Brain Damage (1988) and Deep Red (1975) Guest(s): Felissa Rose (Mangled Dick Expert) Silver Bolo Award: Dead Meat
13	4	"Week 4"	May 15, 2020
Movies: Troma's War (1988) and One Cut of the Dead (2017) Guest(s): Lloyd Kaufman & Pat Swinney Kaufman (Troma's War) Silver Bolo Award: Monster Kid Radio
14	5	"Week 5"	May 22, 2020
Movies: The Exorcist III (1990) and Deadbeat at Dawn (1988) Silver Bolo Award: The Horror Movie Podcast
15	6	"Week 6"	May 29, 2020
Movies: Dead Heat (1988) and Cannibal Holocaust (1980) Guest(s): Felissa Rose (Mangled Dick Expert) Silver Bolo Award: The Homicidal Homemaker
16	7	"Week 7"	June 5, 2020
Movies: Mayhem (2017) and Tetsuo: The Iron Man (1989) Guest(s): Felissa Rose (Mangled Dick Expert) Silver Bolo Award: Witch Finger
17	8	"Week 8"	June 12, 2020
Movies: Scare Package (2020) and Hogzilla (2020) Silver Bolo Award: The Signal Podcast
18	9	"Week 9"	June 19, 2020
Movies: Hellbound: Hellraiser II (1988) and Hell Comes to Frogtown (1988) Guest(s): Ashley Laurence & Doug Bradley (Hellbound: Hellraiser II) Silver Bolo Award: The Horrors of It All
19	10	"Summer Sleepover"	August 14, 2020
Movies: Slumber Party Massacre II (1987) and Victor Crowley (2017) Guest(s): Felissa Rose, Adam Green, Kane Hodder, Brian Quinn, & Tiffany Shepis (Victor Crowley) Silver Bolo Award: Cinemassacre

=== Season 3 (2021) ===
No. overall	No. in season	Title	Original release date
20	1	"Week 1"	April 16, 2021
Movies: Mother's Day (1980) and The House by the Cemetery (1981) Guest(s): Eli Roth (Mother's Day & The House by the Cemetery Co-Host) Silver Bolo Award: Screaming Soup!
21	2	"Week 2"	April 23, 2021
Movies: Audition (1999) and Class of 1984 (1982) Guest(s): Yuki Nakamura (Production Designer) Silver Bolo Award: Zombie Joe's Underground
22	3	"Week 3"	April 30, 2021
Movies: Bride of Re-Animator (1990) and Next of Kin (1982) Guest(s): Jeffrey Combs (Bride of Re-Animator) Silver Bolo Award: The Losers' Club
23	4	"Week 4"	May 7, 2021
Movies: Ginger Snaps (2000) and Fried Barry (2020) Guest(s): Felissa Rose (Mangled Dick Expert) Silver Bolo Award: Doctor Wolfula
24	5	"Week 5"	May 14, 2021
Movies: Mandy (2018) and Dead & Buried (1981) Silver Bolo Award: Knight Light
25	6	"Week 6"	May 21, 2021
Movies: Maniac Cop (1988) and Maniac Cop 2 (1990) Guest(s): Bruce Campbell (Maniac Cop), William Lustig (Maniac Cop 2) Silver Bolo Award: CadaverCast
26	7	"Week 7"	May 28, 2021
Movies: Train to Busan (2016) and Spookies (1986) Silver Bolo Award: Ghastly Grinning
27	8	"Week 8"	June 4, 2021
Movies: Sledgehammer (1983) and Things (1989) Guest(s): Chris Jericho (Things) Silver Bolo Award: SOV Horror
28	9	"Week 9"	June 11, 2021
Movies: Evilspeak (1981) and The Day of the Beast (1995) Guest(s): Clint Howard (Evilspeak) Silver Bolo Award: Bloodbath and Beyond
29	10	"Week 10"	June 18, 2021
Movies: The Little Shop of Horrors (1960) and Humanoids from the Deep (1980) Guest(s): Roger Corman (The Little Shop of Horrors & Humanoids from the Deep) Silver Bolo Award: Good Bad Flicks

=== Season 4 (2022) ===
No. overall	No. in season	Title	Original release date
30	1	"Week 1"	April 29, 2022
Movies: Night of the Living Dead (1968) and Antropophagus (1980) Guest(s): Svengoolie (Night of the Living Dead), Honey Michelle Gregory (Antropophagus)
31	2	"Week 2"	May 6, 2022
Movies: Black Sunday (1960) and Def by Temptation (1990)
32	3	"Week 3"	May 13, 2022
Movies: The Little Girl Who Lives Down the Lane (1976) and Housebound (2014)
33	4	"Week 4"	May 20, 2022
Movies: Nosferatu (1922) and Nosferatu the Vampyre (1979)
34	5	"Week 5"	May 27, 2022
Movies: Slaughterhouse (1987) and Tenebrae (1982)
35	6	"Week 6"	June 3, 2022
Movies: The Monster Club (1981) and Hellbender (2021) Guest(s): John Adams, Toby Poser, & Zelda Adams (Hellbender)
36	7	"Week 7"	June 10, 2022
Movies: Butcher, Baker, Nightmare Maker (1981) and The Baby (1973)
37	8	"Week 8"	June 17, 2022
Movies: The Stepfather (1987) and The Freakmaker (1974)
38	9	"Week 9"	June 24, 2022
Movies: Head of the Family (1996) and Habit (1997) Guest(s): Charles Band (Head of the Family), Larry Fessenden (Habit)
39	10	"Week 10"	July 1, 2022
Movies: Uncle Sam (1996) and Nightbreed (1990)

=== Season 5 (2023) ===
No. overall	No. in season	Title	Original release date
40	1	"Week 1"	April 21, 2023
Movies: Zombi 2 (1979) and The Beyond (1981) Guest(s): David Dastmalchian, Peaches Christ, Danhausen, Ian McCulloch, Felissa Rose (Mangled Dick Expert), & Bobcat Goldthwait
41	2	"Week 2"	April 28, 2023
Movies: Witchboard (1986) and The Devil's Rain (1975) Guest(s): Robert Murch (Ouija board expert)
42	3	"Week 3"	May 5, 2023
Movies: Don't Panic (1987) and Tigers Are Not Afraid (2017)
43	4	"Week 4"	May 12, 2023
Movies: The Babadook (2014) and The Muthers (1976)
44	5	"Week 5"	May 19, 2023
Movies: The Mutilator (1984) and Possession (1981)
45	6	"Week 6"	June 23, 2023
Movies: Sharknado (2013) and Amsterdamned (1988) Guest(s): Anthony C. Ferrante
46	7	"Week 7"	June 30, 2023
Movies: Dark Night of the Scarecrow (1981) and Beyond the Door III (1989)
47	8	"Week 8"	July 7, 2023
Movies: Mad God (2021) and Perfect Blue (1997) Guest(s): Phil Tippett
48	9	"Week 9"	July 14, 2023
Movies: Alligator (1980) and Grizzly (1976)
49	10	"Season Finale"	July 21, 2023
Movies: The Living Dead at Manchester Morgue (1974) and Day of the Dead (1985) Guest(s): Lori Cardille, Terry Alexander and Jarlath Conroy

=== Season 6 (2024) ===
No. overall	No. in season	Title	Original release date
50	1	"Week 1"	March 29, 2024
Movie: Rottentail (2019)
51	2	"Week 2"	April 12, 2024
Movie: The Toxic Avenger (1984) Guest(s): Lloyd Kaufman, James T. Mills and Lisa Buss
52	3	"Week 3"	April 26, 2024
Movie: The Autopsy of Jane Doe (2016) Guest(s): Eric Garcia, Ian Goldberg and Richard Naing
53	4	"Week 4"	May 10, 2024
Movie: Death Spa (1988)
54	5	"Week 5"	May 24, 2024
Movie: Graduation Day (1981)
55	6	"Week 6"	June 7, 2024
Movie: Donnie Darko (2001) Guest(s): Bob Berney
56	7	"Week 7"	June 21, 2024
Movie: Suitable Flesh (2023) Guest(s): Joe Lynch
57	8	"Week 8"	July 5, 2024
Movie: Dr. Giggles (1992)
58	9	"Week 9"	July 19, 2024
Movie: Carnival of Souls (1962)
59	10	"Week 10"	August 2, 2024
Movie: Death Game (1977) Guest(s): Colleen Camp
60	11	"Week 11"	August 16, 2024
Movie: Cemetery Man (1994)

=== Season 7 (2025–2026) ===
No. overall	No. in season	Title	Original release date
61	1	"Week 1"	March 7, 2025
Movies: The Phantom of the Opera (1925) and Opera (1987) Guest(s): Spencer Charnas, Shane Morton (Special Effects Artist)
62	2	"Week 2"	April 4, 2025
Movies: Intruder (1989) and In a Violent Nature (2024)
63	3	"Week 3"	May 2, 2025
Movies: The City of the Dead (1960) and Ringu (1998)
64	4	"Week 4"	June 6, 2025
Movies: Earth vs. the Spider (1958) and Dark Match (2024) Guest(s): Lowell Dean
65	5	"Week 5"	July 11, 2025
Movies: Dog Soldiers (2002) and Bad Moon (1996)
66	6	"Week 6"	August 1, 2025
Movies: Piranha (1978) and Crocodile (1980)
67	7	"Week 7"	September 5, 2025
Movies: This Night I'll Possess Your Corpse (1967) and The Church (1989) Guest(s): Raymond Castile
68	8	"Week 8"	October 3, 2025
Movies: Mute Witness (1995) and The Final Terror (1983) Guest(s): C. Robert Cargill
69	9	"Week 9"	November 7, 2025
Movies: The Bird with the Crystal Plumage (1970) and Blood and Black Lace (1964) Guest(s): Claire Donner, Troy Howarth, Lars Nilsen, and Sam Zimmerman
70	10	"Week 10"	January 9, 2026
Movies: Don't Torture a Duckling (1972) and Don't Go in the Woods (1981) Guest(s): TBA
71	11	"Week 11"	February 6, 2026
Movies: House on Haunted Hill (1959) and The Innkeepers (2011)
72	12	"Week 12"	March 6, 2026
Movies: Messiah of Evil (1974) and The Last Horror Film (1982)

=== Specials ===
Title	Original release date
"July 2018 Marathon"	July 13, 2018
Movies: Tourist Trap (1979), Sleepaway Camp (1983), Rabid (1977), The Prowler (1981), Sorority Babes in the Slimeball Bowl-O-Rama (1988), Daughters of Darkness (1971), Blood Feast (1963), Basket Case (1982), Re-Animator (1985), Demons (1985), The Legend of Boggy Creek (1972), Hellraiser (1987), and Pieces (1982) Guest(s): Felissa Rose (Sleepaway Camp), Lyle Blackburn (Fouke Monster Expert)
"Joe Bob's Dinners of Death"	November 22, 2018
Movies: The Texas Chain Saw Massacre (1974), The Hills Have Eyes (1977), Dead or Alive (1999), and Blood Rage (1987) Guest(s): Michael Berryman (The Hills Have Eyes), Felissa Rose (Mangled Dick Expert)
"A Very Joe Bob Christmas"	December 21, 2018
Movies: Phantasm (1979), Phantasm III: Lord of the Dead (1994), Phantasm IV: Oblivion (1998), and Phantasm: Ravager (2016) Guest(s): Reggie Bannister (Phantasm Franchise), Gigi Bannister (Phantasm: Ravager)
"Joe Bob's Halloween Hootenanny"	October 25, 2019
Movies: Halloween (1978), Halloween 4: The Return of Michael Myers (1988), and Halloween 5: The Revenge of Michael Myers (1989) Guest(s): Tom Atkins (Teen Heartthrob)
"Joe Bob's Red Christmas"	December 13, 2019
Movies: Black Christmas (1974), Jack Frost (1997), and Silent Night Deadly Night Part 2 (1987) Silver Bolo Award: Dinosaur Dracula
"Joe Bob's Halloween Hideaway"	October 23, 2020
Movies: Haunt (2019) and Hack-O-Lantern (1988) Silver Bolo Award: StabbyTimeTV
"Joe Bob Saves Christmas"	December 11, 2020
Movies: Dial Code Santa Claus (1989) and Christmas Evil (1980) Silver Bolo Award: Geeks Who Eat
"Joe Bob Put a Spell on You"	February 12, 2021
Movies: Tammy and the T-Rex (1994) and The Love Witch (2016) Guest(s): Anna Biller (The Love Witch) Silver Bolo Award: The Real Queen of Horror
"Joe Bob's Halloween Hoedown"	October 8, 2021
Movies: Angel (1984) and Terror Train (1980) Guest(s): David Gordon Green (Angel) & Jason Blum (Terror Train)
"The Last Drive-in: The Walking Dead"	October 29, 2021
Episodes: Days Gone Bye (2010) and Guts (2010) Guest(s): Greg Nicotero & Carey Jones (The Walking Dead)
"Joe Bob Ruins Christmas"	December 17, 2021
Movies: Ice Cream Man (1995) and 'Gator Bait (1974) Guest(s): Felissa Rose ('Gator Bait)
"Joe Bob's Heartbreak Trailer Park"	February 11, 2022
Movies: Black Roses (1988) and Frankenhooker (1990) Guest(s): Boulet Brothers (Black Roses), Frank Henenlotter & James Lorinz (Frankenhooker)
"Joe Bob's Halloween Hangout"	October 21, 2022
Movies: Elvira's Haunted Hills (2001) and Popcorn (1991) Guest(s): Cassandra Peterson (Elvira's Haunted Hills), Jill Schoelen (Popcorn)
"Joe Bob's Ghoultide Get-Together"	December 16, 2022
Movies: Don't Open till Christmas (1984) and A Christmas Horror Story (2015)
"Joe Bob's Vicious Vegas Valentine"	February 10, 2023
Movies: Phantom of the Mall: Eric's Revenge (1989) and Nekromantik (1988)
"The Walking Dead: Dead City Special"	June 18, 2023
Episode: Old Acquaintances (2023) Guest(s): Eli Jorné
"Live From The Jamboree"	September 8, 2023
Movies: Night of the Demons (1988) Guest(s): Linnea Quigley and Amelia Kinkade
"The Walking Dead: Daryl Dixon"	September 15, 2023
Episode: L'ame Perdue (2023) Guest(s): Greg Nicotero
"The Last Drive-In Fear Fest: Halloween 1978"	October 10, 2023
Movies: Halloween (1978)
"Joe Bob's Helloween"	October 20, 2023
Movies: Demons 2 (1986) and All Hallows' Eve (2013) Guest(s): Danhausen
"Joe Bob's Creepy Christmas"	December 15, 2023
Movies: The Brain (1988) and The Gingerdead Man (2005) Guest(s): Robin Sydney
"Joe Bob's Very Violent Valentine"	February 9, 2024
Movies: Freeway (1996) and Vamp (1986)
"The Walking Dead: The Ones Who Live"	March 1, 2024
Episode: Years (2024)
"The Last Drive-In Live: A Tribute to Roger Corman"	March 15, 2024
Movies: A Bucket of Blood (1959) and Deathstalker (1983) Guest(s): Julie and Roger Corman, Bruce Dern
"The Last Drive-In: Nightmareathon"	August 30, 2024
Movies: The Slumber Party Massacre (1982), When Evil Lurks (2023), Bloody Muscle Body Builder in Hell (1995), Fade to Black (1980), Children of the Corn (1984) and Galaxy of Terror (1981) Guest(s): Rhonda Shear, Felissa Rose, Dave Sheridan and Robin Sydney
"The Last Drive-In Fear Fest: Friday the 13th"	October 9, 2024
Movies: Friday the 13th (1980), Friday the 13th Part 2 (1981) Guest(s): Adrienne King
"Joe Bob's Beelzebub Bash"	October 25, 2024
Movies: Satan's Little Helper (2004) and Late Night with the Devil (2023) Guest(s): Jeff Lieberman and David Dastmalchian
"Joe Bob's Christmas Carnage"	December 13, 2024
Movies: Rare Exports: A Christmas Tale (2010) and It's a Wonderful Knife (2023)
"The Last Drive-In on Fear Fest 2025"	October 8, 2025
Movies: A Nightmare on Elm Street (1984) and Freddy vs. Jason (2003)
"Joe Bob’s Splatterween"	October 24, 2025
Movies: Clown in a Cornfield (2025) and Jack-O (1995) Guest(s): Gwar, Adam Cesare and Eli Craig
"Joe Bob’s Cold Cruel Christmas"	December 12, 2025
Movies: Curtains (1983) and Iced (1988)
"Joe Bob's Wicked Witchy Wingding"	April 24, 2026
Movies: Rawhead Rex (1986) and Oddity (2024)
"Joe Bob's Savage Summer"	July 10, 2026
Movies: I Spit On Your Grave (1978) and Tokyo Gore Police (2008) Guest(s): Camille Keaton and Felissa Rose
"Joe Bob's Halloween House Party"	October 23, 2026
Movies: Body Bags (1993) and WNUF Halloween Special (2013) Guest(s): Chris LaMartina
"Joe Bob Conquers Christmas"	December 4, 2026
Movies: TBA Guest(s): TBA
