= Joe Bob Briggs =

American film critic, writer, and actor; alter ego of John Bloom (born 1953)

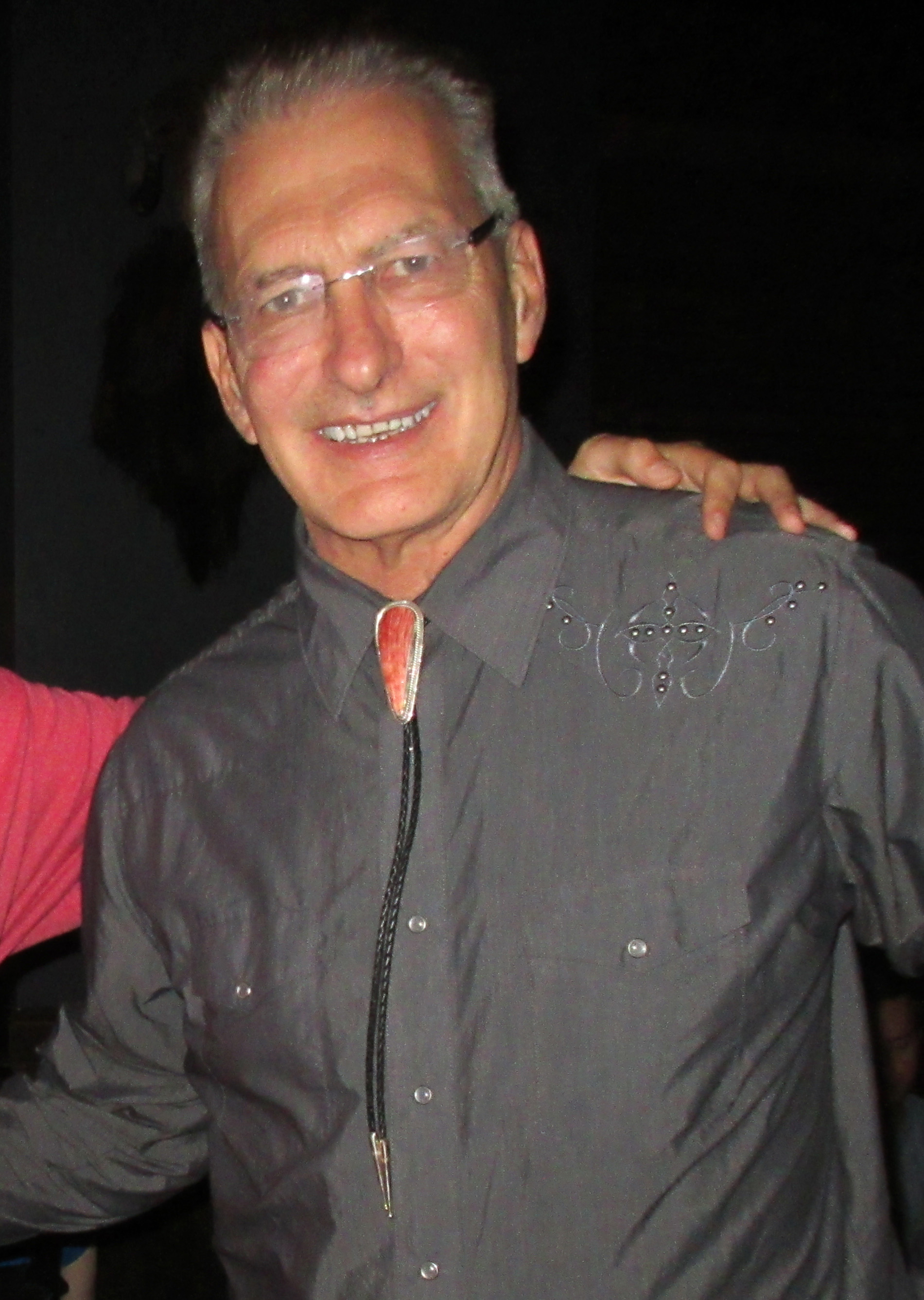
- Briggs in 2018
- Born: John Irving Bloom; January 27, 1953 (age 73); Dallas, Texas, U.S.
- Education: Vanderbilt University
- Occupations: Film critic; writer; actor
- Website: joebobbriggs.com

John Irving Bloom (born January 27, 1953), known by the stage name Joe Bob Briggs, is an American syndicated film critic, writer, actor, comic performer, and horror host. He is known for having hosted Joe Bob's Drive-in Theater on The Movie Channel from 1986 to 1996, the TNT series MonsterVision from 1996 to 2000, and The Last Drive-in with Joe Bob Briggs on Shudder beginning in 2018. In 2019, he was named the Rondo Hatton Classic Horror Awards' Monster Kid of the Year, and in 2023 was inducted into the Rondo Hatton Awards' Monster Kid Hall of Fame.

== Early years ==
John Irving Bloom was born January 27, 1953, in Dallas, Texas, the son of Thelma Louise (née Berry) and Rudolph Lewis Bloom.

Bloom was raised in Little Rock, Arkansas, and by age 13 was a sportswriter at what was then the Arkansas Democrat. He won a Fred Russell-Grantland Rice Sportswriting Scholarship to Vanderbilt University, in Nashville, Tennessee, where he majored in English and wrote for the student newspaper, The Vanderbilt Hustler. After graduating in 1975, he became a reporter for the Dallas Times Herald and later wrote for Texas Monthly magazine. Taking a leave of absence from the newspaper in order to co-write (with Jim Atkinson) the true crime book Evidence of Love (later adapted as the TV film, A Killing in a Small Town), he supported himself by writing movie reviews for the paper. There he created the humorous persona of "Joe Bob Briggs" to review exploitation films and other genre movies.

== Persona ==
Bloom's acting persona as "Briggs" is that of an unapologetic redneck Texan with an avowed love of drive-in theaters. He specializes in humorous but appreciative reviews of B-movies and cult films, which he calls "drive-in movies" (as distinguished from "indoor bullstuff"). In addition to his usual parody of urbane, high-brow movie criticism, his columns characteristically include colorful tales of woman troubles and high-spirited brushes with the law, which inevitably conclude with his rush to catch a movie at a local drive-in, usually with female companionship. "Briggs" revealed in an interview that he intended the character to have an ambiguous sounding name and initially thought of calling himself "Bubba Rodriguez", but was told that the name Rodriguez would be perceived as racist and decided to go with: "The whitest name I could come up with."

The reviews typically end with a brief rating of the "high points" of the movie in question, including the types of action (represented by nouns naming objects used in fight scenes suffixed with "-Fu"), the number of bodies, number of female breasts bared, the notional number of total pints of blood spilled, and for appropriately untoward movies, a "vomit meter".

A typical review summary might read:

"No dead bodies. One hundred seventeen breasts. Multiple aardvarking. (Note: "Aardvarking" is one of many euphemisms Briggs uses in reference to sexual intercourse.) Lap dancing. Cage dancing. Convenience-store dancing. Blindfold aardvarking. Blind-MAN aardvarking. Lesbo Fu. Pool cue-Fu. Drive-In Academy Award nominations for Tané McClure. Joe Bob says check it out."

Originally, Bloom's film reviews as "Briggs" were limited to pictures shown at local drive-ins, as others at the newspaper were assigned to mainstream and grindhouse cinema. Later, after a tongue-in-cheek "battle" with his own convictions in Joe Bob Goes Back to the Drive In, he also began reviewing films released on VHS and DVD.

=== Reaction to redevelopment of 42nd Street ===
During the early 1980s, when New York City was in the planning stages of redeveloping its run-down 42nd Street, Times Square area, which included closing many grindhouses showing B-movies on double and triple bills around the clock, as well as many porn theaters, Briggs encouraged a "postcard-Fu" campaign encouraging genre-film fans to write to city officials and pressure them into saving "the one place in New York City you could see a decent drive-in movie".

== Television ==
In 1986, as a result of the stage show, "Briggs" was asked to be a guest host on Drive-in Theater, a late-night B-movie show on The Movie Channel (TMC). This led to his hosting Joe Bob's Drive-in Theater, which ran from 1986 to 1996, It was twice nominated for the industry's CableACE Award. After the show ended, he hosted the TNT network's similar MonsterVision for four years through July 2000.

In the late 1990s, "Briggs" spent two seasons as a commentator on Comedy Central's The Daily Show (under his given name, John Bloom), with a recurring segment called God Stuff. He appears in Frank Henenlotter's documentary Herschell Gordon Lewis – Godfather of Gore.

In 2018, the horror-themed subscription video on demand service Shudder, owned and operated by AMC, signed Briggs for a new series, The Last Drive-in with Joe Bob Briggs, which premiered as a 13-film marathon on July 13, 2018. During the premiere, Shudder's servers crashed as a result of a large number of subscribers attempting to access the show. Shudder streamed two shorter marathons on Thanksgiving and Christmas Day 2018 Beginning in March 2020, the show returned to Briggs' old double-feature format. A second season consisting of 10 films premiered April 24, 2020. Season 3 began April 16, 2021.

"Briggs" was also a commentator for a Fox TV news magazine for two seasons. He also appeared in episodes of the Fox sitcom Married... with Children in season 8 and 9 as Billy Ray Wetnap, co-owner of Pest Boys Pest Control. He also wrote and performed in specials for Fox and Showtime, and collaborated with comedy writer Norman Steinberg on an unproduced NBC sitcom.

== Magazine and newspaper writing ==
"Briggs" has written for Newsweek, National Lampoon, Rolling Stone, Playboy, The Village Voice, and National Review,

Bloom's two syndicated newspaper columns as "Briggs", "Joe Bob Goes to the Drive-in" and "Joe Bob's America", were picked up by The New York Times Syndicate in the 1990s. For one year he wrote a humorous sex advice column in Penthouse. In 2000, he started writing the "Drive-in" column again, this time for United Press International, along with a second column, "The Vegas Guy", which chronicles Briggs' weekly forays into the casinos of America.

"Briggs" was president of the Trinity Foundation of Dallas, a non-denominational, non-profit public foundation that serves as a religious watchdog group and publishes The Door, a Christian satire magazine, for which "Briggs" was a regular columnist.

== Books ==
Under his given name, John Bloom, he co-wrote (with Jim Atkinson) the nonfiction book Evidence of Love: The Candy Montgomery Story (1984). The book recounts the 1980 Wylie, Texas murder case in which Montgomery killed her ex-lover's wife, Betty Gore, by striking her 41 times with an axe and whose highly publicized trial ended in an unexpected acquittal. The book was adapted into the CBS TV film, A Killing in a Small Town, starring Barbara Hershey, and the HBO Max miniseries, Love & Death, starring Elizabeth Olsen.

As "Joe Bob Briggs", Bloom has published five books of satire—Joe Bob Goes to the Drive In, A Guide to Western Civilization, or My Story, Joe Bob Goes Back to the Drive In, The Cosmic Wisdom of Joe Bob Briggs, and Iron Joe Bob, his homage to the men's movement and the nonfiction books Profoundly Disturbing: Shocking Movies That Changed History and Profoundly Erotic: Sexy Movies that Changed History.

In 2016, again under his given name, Bloom wrote the nonfiction book Eccentric Orbits: The Iridium Story in which he traces the conception, development, and launching of the Iridium satellite constellation and the race to save it from destruction.

== One-man shows ==
In July 1985, Bloom's one-man show An Evening with Joe Bob Briggs debuted in Cleveland, Ohio. Later re-titled Joe Bob Dead in Concert for home release, the show evolved into a theatrical piece involving storytelling, comedy and music. The show was performed in more than 50 venues over the next two years, including Carolines on Broadway in New York and regular engagements at Wolfgang's and the Great American Music Hall in San Francisco, as well as at convention centers, theaters, music clubs and other comedy clubs. In 2019, Briggs began performing a new one-man show, How Rednecks Saved Hollywood, at genre film festivals and revival movie houses.

== Other ==
"Briggs" has contributed audio commentaries to DVDs released by Media Blasters and Elite Entertainment including Jesse James Meets Frankenstein's Daughter, The Double-D Avenger, Michael Findlay's Blood Sisters, Warlock Moon, Samurai Cop, I Spit on Your Grave, and several Ray Dennis Steckler films including The Incredibly Strange Creatures Who Stopped Living and Became Mixed-Up Zombies and Blood Shack.

Bloom appeared as himself in the Jonathan Maberry novel Bad Moon Rising (2008). Joe Bob is one of several real-world horror celebrities who are in the fictional town of Pine Deep when monsters attack.

In 2025, Briggs hosted the first "Joe Bob Halloween Spooktacular" at the Texas Theatre in Dallas featuring five movies that were not announced prior to screening. The event occurred over twelve hours from 7:00pm to 7:00am with a costume contest, burlesque performance, and commentary between movies. The second annual Spooktacular in 2026 maintained a similar format but featured a live performance by magician Mac King.

== Personal life ==
In May 2020, Bloom contracted COVID-19 but did not make his condition known to the public. Discussing the experience on the podcast Geek Tawk, Bloom stated, "Many people have had [COVID-19] and most of them were much worse off than me. [...] I wish everybody thought it was a death sentence, because then everyone would wear the fucking mask and then we would get rid of it."

== Filmography ==
Film
Year	Title	Role	Notes
1986	The Texas Chainsaw Massacre 2	Gonzo Moviegoer	Scenes deleted
1989	Great Balls of Fire!	Dewey "Daddy-O" Phillips	
1990	Hollywood Boulevard II	Himself	
1990	A Killing in a Small Town	Writer	Book "Evidence of Love"
1992	The Chiller Theatre Expo Video Vol. 1	Himself	Documentary film
1995	Casino	Don Ward - Slot Manager	
1995	After Sunset: The Life & Times of the Drive-In Theater	Himself	Documentary film
1997	Face/Off	Shock Technician	
1999	The Storytellers	Scrappy the Janitor	
2002	The Many Lives of Jason Voorhees	Himself	Documentary film short
2004	All That You Love Will Be Carried Away	Alfie Zimmer	
2004	Drive-in Movie Memories	Himself	Documentary film
2004	Chainsaw Redux: Making a Massacre	Himself	Documentary film
2005	The Perfect Scary Movie	Himself	Documentary film
2005	Horror Business	Himself	Documentary film
2006	Evil Ever After	Marvin	Direct-to-DVD release
2006	Inspector Mom	Writer	TV movie
2006	American Scary	Himself	Documentary film
2006	Texas Frightmare Weekend 2006	Himself	Documentary film
2007	Ghosts of Goldfield	Clancy	Direct-to-DVD release
2007	Rapturious	Doctor	
2007	Wretched	Eric	
2007	One by One We Will Take You: The Untold Saga of the Evil Dead	Himself	Documentary film
2010	Herschell Gordon Lewis: The Godfather of Gore	Himself	Documentary film
2012	The Sleeper	Doctor Briggs	"Special Guest"
2012	Foodfight!	Additional Voices	
2014	The Nail Gun Massacre: Texas Frightmare Weekend	Himself	Documentary film short
2016	The Ghosts of Johnson Woods	Warren	
2016	VHS Massacre	Himself	Documentary film
2016	In Defense of Henry	Himself	Documentary film short
2017	Its Exactly What You Think It Is! An Appreciation of 'Pieces	Himself	Documentary film short
2017	Roar: The Most Dangerous Movie Ever Made	Himself	Documentary film
2018	Poetry Slammed	Warren	
2018	Survival of the Film Freaks	Himself	Documentary film
2018	Jim Dandy to the Rescue: A Film by Joey Skidmore	Himself	Documentary film
2018	B-Documentary Part Two	Himself	Documentary film
2019	In Search of Darkness	Himself	Documentary film
2019	Scare Package	Himself	"Horror Hypothesis" segment
2020	Hogzilla	Andy McGraw	Release originally planned for 2007
2020	Joe Bob's Haunted Drive-in	Himself	
2020	VHS Massacre Too	Himself	Documentary film
2020	In Search of Darkness: Part II	Himself	Documentary film
2020	Rondo and Bob	Himself	Documentary film
TBA	Werewolf Santa	Himself	
2023	Cryptids	Major Harlan Dean	
Television
Year	Title	Role	Notes
1986–1996	Joe Bob's Drive-in Theater	Himself	527+ episodes
1986	Ed Busch Show	Himself	2nd episode – recorded live at the State Fair of Texas in Dallas
1987	KDAF 33 Friday Movies	Himself	10 episodes
1992	The Tonight Show with Jay Leno	Himself	1 episode
1993–1994	Front Page	Himself	
1993–1994	Married... with Children	Billy Ray Wetnap	2 episodes
1994	The Stand	Deputy Joe-Bob Brentwood	Miniseries
1996–2000	MonsterVision	Himself	207+ episodes
2000–2003	The Daily Show	Contributor 'God Stuff'	
2004	Super Secret Movie Rules	Himself	"Slashers" episode
2018	Cinemassacre Interviews	Himself	1 episode
2018	Without Your Head	Himself	1 episode
2018–2026	The Last Drive-in with Joe Bob Briggs	Himself	7 seasons, 20 specials
2022	The Boulet Brothers' Dragula: Titans	Himself, guest judge	Episode 8

=== Podcast appearances ===
"Briggs" appeared on Ken Reid's TV Guidance Counselor podcast on June 16, 2016, as well as the podcasts Frightday on July 11, 2018, Astonishing Legends Podcast on December 9, 2018, and The Last Podcast on the Left on March 28, 2019. He also appeared on AEW wrestler Chris Jericho's podcast Talk is Jericho.

== Bibliography ==
- Evidence of Love: A True Story of Passion and Death in the Suburbs (1984) with Jim Atkinson, ISBN 1-5040-4952-7
- Joe Bob Goes to the Drive-in (1987), ISBN 0-385-29442-5
- A Guide to Western Civilization, or: My Story (1988), ISBN 0-385-29671-1
- Joe Bob Goes Back to the Drive-in (1990), ISBN 0-385-29770-X
- The Cosmic Wisdom of Joe Bob Briggs (1990), ISBN 0-394-58890-8
- Iron Joe Bob (1992), ISBN 0-87113-488-8
- Profoundly Disturbing: Shocking Movies that Changed History! (2003), ISBN 0-7893-0844-4
- Profoundly Erotic: Sexy Movies that Changed History (2005), ISBN 0-7893-1314-6
- Eccentric Orbits: The Iridium Story (2016), ISBN 0-8021-2168-3
