= Rat Pfink a Boo Boo =

- Lobby card for the Mexican film release
- Directed by: Ray Dennis Steckler
- Screenplay by: Ron Haydock
- Story by: Ray Dennis Steckler
- Produced by: Ray Dennis Steckler
- Starring: Carolyn Brandt; Ron Haydock; Titus Moede; George Caldwell; Mike Kannon; James Bowie
- Cinematography: Ray Dennis Steckler
- Edited by: Keith A. Wester
- Music by: André Brummer
- Distributed by: Craddock Films
- Release date: September 7, 1966
- Running time: 72 minutes
- Country: United States
- Language: English

Rat Pfink a Boo Boo is a 1966 American superhero comedy film directed by Ray Dennis Steckler and starring Ron Haydock and Carolyn Brandt. The first 40 minutes of the film are a straight crime drama, but it jarringly segues into a superhero parody after this. The title is alternately explained as a typo that was too expensive to fix (versus the more logical Rat Pfink and Boo Boo) or a stylistic choice.

In the film, a rock and roll star adopts the secret identity of Rat Pfink to rescue his kidnapped girlfriend. A friend of his adopts the identity of Rat Pfink's sidekick Boo Boo. They use a vehicle named the "Ratcycle" in homage to the Batcycle. The film was reportedly intended as a parody of the campy Batman television series. Rat Pfink is a parody of Batman and Boo Boo is a parody of Batman's sidekick Robin.

== Plot ==
After murdering an unnamed woman, the villainous "Chain Gang" targets Cee Bee Beaumont, the girlfriend of rock and roll star Lonnie Lord. The Chain Gang harasses, stalks, and eventually abducts Beaumont.

In order to save his girlfriend, Lord takes on the identity of "Rat Pfink", and his friend, Titus Twimbly, assumes the role of Rat Pfink's sidekick, "Boo Boo". On their Ratcycle, the duo eventually manages to track down the Chain Gang. After a long chase and the resulting confrontation with the gang, Rat Pfink and Boo Boo rescue Beaumont. However, Beaumont is abducted again, this time by "Kogar the Ape", a gorilla that has escaped from a local zoo. Kogar easily knocks out Rat Pfink, but his keeper soon comes and collects the ape. At the end of the film, Lord performs for everyone at a parade held to honor the heroes.

== Cast ==
- Carolyn Brandt as Cee Bee Beaumont
- Ron Haydock as Rat Pfink / Lonnie Lord (as Vin Saxon)
- Titus Moede as Boo Boo / Titus Twimbly
- George Caldwell as Linc
- Mike Kannon as Hammer
- James Bowie as Benjie
- Mary Jo Curtis as Irma La Streetwalker
- Keith A. Wester as Cowboy (as Dean Danger)
- Romeo Barrymore as Ape trainer
- Berri Lee as Boy #1 on beach
- Rox Anne as Girl on beach
- Alan Neal as Boy #2 on beach
- Bob Burns as Kogar (as Kogar)
- Larry M. Byrd as Commander Byrdman (uncredited)

== Production ==
The film makes a sudden switch in tone and plot after roughly 40 minutes. As originally planned, the film was a straight crime drama titled The Depraved, inspired by Steckler's ex-wife Carolyn, who had been the victim of a series of obscene phone calls. However, during shooting, Steckler decided to make a parody of the campy Batman television series instead. As a result, in the middle of a crime drama, the star of the film steps into the closet with a previously minor character, and they emerge in homemade costumes as "Rat Pfink" and "Boo Boo", who are parodies of Batman and Robin.

== Title ==
Why the title is Rat Pfink a Boo Boo and not the more logical Rat Pfink and Boo Boo is the subject of speculation. According to legend, Rat Pfink and Boo Boo was indeed the intended title, but when the artist creating the titles made an error and rendered the "and" as "a", Steckler's budget would not stretch to the $50 needed to fix the mistake. According to Steckler, however, the choice of title was deliberate: "The real story is that my little girl, when we were shooting this one fight scene, kept chanting, 'Rat pfink a boo boo, rat pfink a boo boo...' And that sounded great! But when I tell people the real story, they don't wanna hear it, so you better print the legend."

== Music ==
Ron Haydock performs four songs for the film: "I Stand Alone", "Rat Fink", "Runnin' Wild", and "Go Go Party".

== Reception ==
TV Guide rated Rat Pfink a Boo Boo 2/4 stars and called it an amateurish film whose "goofy, improvisational good humor makes a lot of it fun to watch". Jackson Griffith of News & Review wrote, "Either Rat Pfink a Boo Boo is a raving pile of crap, or it is some kind of genius filmmaking. I'm inclined to give Steckler the benefit of the doubt." A printed media review is located in Robert Freese's Psychoholics Unanimous.

James Lowder reviewed Rat Pfink a Boo Boo in White Wolf Inphobia #51 (Jan., 1995), rating it a 1 1/2 out of 5 and stated that "Steckler's works reflect his personality and interests. Okay, so that's not much to recommend, but this film has more spirit than such snide, big-budget schlock as The Goonies or most of the pablum pumped out by professional studios such as Full Moon."
