= Body Fever =

Body Fever or Super Cool is a 1969 American low-budget crime drama film, directed by Ray Dennis Steckler. It stars Carolyn Brandt as a cat burglar and Bernard Fein as a down and out detective searching for her. Rotten Tomatoes mentions that in the film a "lackadaisical gumshoe is caught between a glamorous thief, a gang of ruthless hoodlums and a handful of vicious drug peddlers in this quirky crime drama".

Steckler created a bit part for then destitute fellow director Coleman Francis. Francis died just a few years later in 1973.

== Cast ==
- Carolyn Brandt as Carrie Erskine
- Bernard Fein as Big Mack
- Gary Kent as Frankie Roberts
- Brett Pearson as Brett
- Herb Robins as Herbie
- Ray Dennis Steckler as Charles Smith
- Coleman Francis as Coley
- Dina Bryan as Stella
- Julie Conners as Shawn Call
- Brett Zeller as Carol Hollister

== Reception ==
Video Watchdog notes that though Steckler's films had displayed a "steady decline" during this period, Body Fever was the exception.
