= Things (film) =

1989 Canadian film

- DVD cover
- Directed by: Andrew Jordan
- Screenplay by: Andrew Jordan; Barry J. Gillis
- Produced by: Andrew Jordan; Barry J. Gillis; Lorinda Collins
- Starring: Barry J. Gillis; Amber Lynn; Bruce Roach; Doug Bunston; Jan W. Pachul; Patricia Sadler
- Cinematography: Dan Riggs
- Edited by: Andrew Jordan; Barry J. Gillis
- Music by: Jack Procher
- Production company: Left Field Productions
- Distributed by: Intervision
- Release date: September 1989
- Running time: 83 minutes
- Country: Canada
- Language: English

Things is a 1989 Canadian independent direct-to-video horror film, directed by Andrew Jordan and written by Jordan and Barry J. Gillis. The film was shot in the Toronto suburb of Scarborough, Ontario, with a cast consisting of co-writer Barry J. Gillis and pornographic film star Amber Lynn. The plot follows two friends who, while visiting a relative's house, encounter a horde of hostile creatures that are the results of experiments by a demented doctor.

Things is considered the first Canadian shot-on-Super 8 horror film released for the VHS market, as well as one of the worst films of all time.

== Plot ==
Don and Fred decide to visit the house of Doug, Don's brother. They are unaware that Doug and his wife Susan, who have been unable to conceive a child naturally, have been participating in unconventional experiments performed by Doctor Lucas, in order to artificially induce pregnancy in Susan. While looking for beer in Doug's house, Don and Fred discover a book written by Aleister Crowley, as well as a tape recorder that plays a recording of a distorted voice. Hearing the tape, Doug storms in and scolds them before joining them in their drinking.

Susan gives birth to insect-like creatures before dying. The creatures attack and kill a dog. Doug explains to Don and Fred about the experiments he and Susan had been involved in with Doctor Lucas, and that they went awry. The power in the house suddenly goes out, and the creatures born of Susan infest the house and attack the men.

Don and Doug search the house with a flashlight. In the basement, a creature attacks Doug from behind. Don attempts to strike the creature with a hammer, but accidentally bludgeons Doug instead. Don helps Doug back upstairs, where another creature bites off several of Doug's fingers. Don cauterizes Doug's wounds, but Doug dies. Don hides Doug's body in a closet to prevent the creatures from eating the rest of him.

Armed with a drill, Don continues to wander around the house. He sees visions of Doug still alive, and falls asleep on a couch. Fred appears with a chainsaw while Don finds a golf club, and the two kill several of the creatures. They discover that the creatures have eaten Susan's body, reducing her to mostly bones. The creatures eat Fred alive as he pleads for Don's help. Doctor Lucas arrives at the house, and Don accuses him of being responsible for everyone's deaths. The creatures attack Doctor Lucas, and Don is shown escaping the house and coming across a passerby, who walks with him to a car. Don is then seen back in the house, alongside a bloody Doctor Lucas. He locks himself in the closet and repeats to himself "I'll be okay".

== Cast ==
- Barry J. Gillis as Don Drake
- Amber Lynn as Reporter
- Bruce Roach as Fred Horton
- Doug Bunston as Doug Drake
- Jan W. Pachul as Doctor Lucas

== Release ==
In 1989, Things was released direct-to-video on VHS. In the United States, the film was distributed on VHS by Triworld Films.

Things was released on DVD on September 4, 2008, by Cinema Sewer and Left Field Productions, and was re-released on DVD in 2011 by Severin Films.

In 2021, Joe Bob Briggs hosted the film on The Last Drive-in with Joe Bob Briggs. The episode featuring the movie was subsequently released on VHS in 2022. It has also been featured at film festivals.

== Reception and legacy ==
=== Contemporary reviews ===
A reviewer for Variety wrote of Things that "[t]here are some toothy puppet monsters, more amusing than scary."

=== Retrospective assessments ===
Since its release, Things has gained a reputation as being one of the worst films ever made. Critics from The Beachwood Reporter, Dread Central and Cinema Sewer each described it as being the worst film ever made. Adam Symchuk of Screen Rant writes: "While films like The Room and Birdemic seem to be constant contenders for the best 'so bad it's good' movie, [Things] is the true unheralded champion among many cinephiles." Likewise, a review from DVD Verdict wrote that the film was "a treasure for those who like to revel in the worst of the worst." Meanwhile, J Hurtado of Screen Anarchy described it as "critically unassailable" and Will Pfeifer opined that "It's so terrible I can’t think of another movie that even comes close." After addressing various shortcomings, Erin Brady of /Film wrote: "Things is also one of the most authentic movies you will likely ever watch. It is proof that anyone can pick up a camera and make a movie with their friends, even if their resources are limited."

Caelum Vatnsdal, author of They Came from Within: A History of Canadian Horror Cinema, wrote that Things is "the worst Canadian horror film ever made". In his book Spinegrinder: The Movies Most Critics Won't Write About, Clive Davies stated that, while Things was a strong contender for the title of "best worst movie", it is not well known outside of its cult following.

== See also ==
- List of 20th century films considered the worst
