= Lemon Grove Kids Meet the Monsters =

- Directed by: Ray Dennis Steckler; Peter Balakoff; Ed McWatters; Don Russell (assistant director); Sidney G. Koss (associate director)
- Written by: Ray Dennis Steckler; Jim Harmon; Ron Haydock; E.M. Kevke
- Produced by: Ray Dennis Steckler; George J. Morgan (executive producer); Alan Neal (assistant producer)/(associate producer); Keith A. Wester (executive producer); John Williams (associate producer)
- Starring: Ray Dennis Steckler; Mike Kannon; Carolyn Brandt; Don Snyder; Coleman Francis; Ron Haydock; Keith A. Wester
- Cinematography: Jack Cooperman; Gil Hubbs; Keith A. Wester
- Edited by: Ray Laurent; Keith A. Wester; John Williams
- Music by: André Brummer; Henri Price; Jack Du Frain (music editor); Don Snyder
- Distributed by: Morgan-Steckler Productions; Steckler-Wester Film Productions
- Release date: September 28, 1965
- Running time: 78 minutes
- Country: United States
- Language: English

Lemon Grove Kids Meet the Monsters is a trilogy of short films released during 1965. The films are homages to the Bowery Boys film series which lasted from the mid-1940s to the late 1950s.

Each film of the trilogy features the antics of the bumbling Lemon Grove Kids. They are titled The Lemon Grove Kids, The Lemon Grove Kids Meet the Green Grasshopper and the Vampire Lady from Outer Space, and The Lemon Grove Kids Go Hollywood!. Filmmaker Ray Dennis Steckler created the characters, wrote 'Hollywood', and directed the first film of the trilogy. He also features in each segment, billed as Cash Flagg. The three shorts were edited into a comedy horror feature film, The Lemon Grove Kids Meet The Monsters. For theatrical showings, the film was interrupted by the film's mummy going into the audience.

== Cast ==
The Lemon Grove Kids

- Cash Flagg as Gopher
- Mike Kannon as Slug
- Bart Carsell as Duke Mazaratti
- Coleman Francis as "Big Ed" Narzak
- Larry Pearson as Larry
- Mary Morgan as Ma
- Rox Anne as Roxy
- Herb Robins as Killer Krump
- Kirk Kirksey as Kirk
- Jim Plunkett as Stretch
- Ed McWatters as The Saboteur
- Bob Burns III as Kogar
- Carolyn Brandt as First Girl in Amateur Movie
- Ron Haydock as Rat Pfink/Guitar Player
- Larry M. Byrd as Carnival Vendor
- Tony Flynn as Pee Wee
- George J. Morgan as Officer Clancy
- Cindy Shea as Second Girl in Amateur Movie
- Keith A. Wester as Man Shaving
- Berri Lee as Berri/Blind Man
- Jim Harmon as Chubby Lemon Grove Kid
- Dick Williams as Lemon Grove Kid
- Alan Neal as Member of Killer Krump's Gang
- Don Bouvier as Member of Killer Krump's Gang
- Anthony Cardoza as One of Big Ed's Men
- Don Schneider as Romeo, First Checkpoint
- Mary Demos as Dancing Girl
- Edward G. Wagner as Old Man

The Lemon Grove Kids Meet the Green Grasshopper and the Vampire Lady From Outer Space

- Ray Dennis Steckler as Gopher
- Mike Kannon as Slug
- Keith A. Wester as Marvin-Marvin
- J. Jay Hartford as Skinny
- Kedric Wolfe as Jocko
- Joe Bardo as Brick
- Felicia Guy as Flower
- Beverly Carter as Dum-Dum
- E. M. Kevke as Grasshopper
- Carolyn Brandt as Vampire Lady
- Coleman Francis as Mr. Miller
- Herb Robins as Chooper #1
- Doug Weise as Chooper #2
- Estelle Cooperman as Witch #1
- Patricia Wells as Witch #2
- D. J. Scord as Witch #3
- Tony Flynn as Pee Wee
- Linda C. Steckler as Linda
- Jeff Scott as Jeff
- Lisa Yesko as Lisa
- Kevin Miles as Kevin
- Keith Miles as Brian
- Peter Christoph as Pete
- Derek Quinn as Derek
- Moni Christoph as Moni
- Laura H. Steckler as Tickles

The Lemon Grove Kids Go Hollywood!

- Ray Dennis Steckler as Gopher
- Don Snyder as Don
- Tony Flynn as Pee Wee
- Linda Steckler as Linda
- Laura H. Steckler as Tickles
- Carolyn Brandt as Cee Cee Beaumont
- Herb Robbins as Killer Krump
- Eric Morris as Nick the Gyp
- Keith A. Wester as Swami Marvin
- Boris Balocoff as Mr. Carstairs
- Beverly Carter as Secretary
- Jack DuFrain as Film Editor
- George J. Morgan as Reporter #1
- Mary Morgan as Reporter #2
