= The Mad Love Life of a Hot Vampire =

- Directed by: Ray Dennis Steckler
- Starring: Jim Parker; Carolyn Brandt; Rock Heinrich
- Release date: 1971
- Running time: 50 minutes
- Country: United States
- Language: English

The Mad Love Life of a Hot Vampire is a 1971 American pornographic horror film directed by Ray Dennis Steckler. It stars Jim Parker as Count Dracula, portrayed here as a Las Vegas pimp, along with Carolyn Brandt and Rock Heinrich.

== Cast ==
- Jim Parker as Count Dracula
- Carolyn Brandt as Elaina, wife of Dracula (as Jane Bond)
- Rock Heinrich as Hunchback

== Home media ==
In October 2014, The Mad Love Life of a Hot Vampire was released on DVD by Vinegar Syndrome as a triple feature with the 1973 film Peeping Tom and the 1976 film Red Heat, both of which were also directed by Steckler.

== Reception ==
Mondo Digital recalls that the film, with its 50 minutes, is barely a feature and finds that it is "A truly daffy bargain-basement production playing more like a particularly perverted kid's backyard movie than an actual feature".
