= He's Alive =

- The Twilight Zone episode
- Episode no.: Season 4 Episode 4
- Directed by: Stuart Rosenberg
- Written by: Rod Serling
- Production code: 4856
- Original air date: January 24, 1963

Guest appearances
- Dennis Hopper; Ludwig Donath; Curt Conway; Paul Mazursky; Howard Caine; Barnaby Hale; Jay Adler; Wolfe Barzell; Bernard Fein; Chet Brandenburg; Paul Bryar; Bobby Gilbert; Buck Harrington; Ed Haskett; Robert McCord; William Meader; William H. O'Brien; Bill Zuckert

Episode chronology
← Previous "Valley of the Shadow"	Next → "Mute"
- The Twilight Zone (1959 TV series) (season 4)

"He's Alive" is episode four of the fourth season of The Twilight Zone. It tells of an American neo-Nazi who is visited by a shadowy figure. Writer Rod Serling scripted a longer version of the teleplay to be made into a feature-length film, but it was never produced. This episode is notable for Dennis Hopper's breakout performance as Peter Vollmer.

== Opening narration ==
Portrait of a bush-league Führer named Peter Vollmer, a sparse little man who feeds off his self-delusions and finds himself perpetually hungry for want of greatness in his diet. And like some goose-stepping predecessors he searches for something to explain his hunger, and to rationalize why a world passes him by without saluting. That something he looks for and finds is in a sewer. In his own twisted and distorted lexicon he calls it faith, strength, truth. But in just a moment Peter Vollmer will ply his trade on another kind of corner, a strange intersection in a shadowland called the Twilight Zone.

== Plot ==
Peter Vollmer, the leader of a small and struggling American Neo-Nazi group, is mocked and ridiculed by the crowds he preaches to on street corners. Ernst Ganz, the elderly Jewish man with whom Vollmer has had a sympathetic relationship since he was an abused and neglected child, offers him shelter and compassion but not respect. Ernst had spent nine years in Dachau and recognizes that Vollmer's politics stem from a childish desire for the respect of others. This pains Vollmer, who openly confesses that he views Ernst as a father figure, since his real father physically abused him and his mother was neglectful as a result of mental illness.

Beginning one night, Vollmer is periodically visited by a shadowy figure who teaches him how to enthrall a crowd. The figure pays Vollmer's rent at the hall where he holds rallies. He also instructs Vollmer to arrange the death of one of his followers, Nick Bloss, thereby creating a martyr to rally everyone around (a reference to the 1930 murder of Horst Wessel, a low-ranking officer in the Sturmabteilung). Following the figure's instructions and assistance, Vollmer becomes considerably more successful and his group's following grows. Ernst becomes fearful that Vollmer may actually succeed in igniting another Holocaust. He disrupts a rally, accusing Vollmer of being "nothing but a cheap copy" of the German Führer while Vollmer cowers before his surrogate father.

After the failed rally, the shadowy figure rebukes Vollmer for his failure and says that from now on he will be ordering Vollmer rather than instructing him. Vollmer demands to know who his mysterious benefactor is. The man steps forward from the shadows to reveal himself to be Adolf Hitler. He orders Vollmer to kill Ernst, and Vollmer steels himself enough to complete the task. Hitler congratulates him and asks how it felt; Vollmer replies that he felt immortal. Hitler responds, "Mr. Vollmer, we are immortal!"

Police officers arrive soon after, to arrest Vollmer for conspiracy to murder Nick. Shot while fleeing, Vollmer is astonished by the sight of his own blood. Hitler's shadow appears on the wall behind Vollmer as he gasps out, "There's something very wrong here...Don't you understand that I'm made out of steel!?" As Vollmer dies, alone and forgotten, the Führer slinks away to search for a new mouthpiece.

== Closing narration ==
Where will he go next, this phantom from another time, this resurrected ghost of a previous nightmare – Chicago? Los Angeles? Miami, Florida? Vincennes, Indiana? Syracuse, New York? Any place, every place where there's hate, where there's prejudice, where there's bigotry – he's alive. He's alive so long as these evils exist. Remember that when he comes to your town. Remember it when you hear his voice speaking out through others. Remember it when you hear a name called, a minority attacked, any blind, unreasoning assault on a people or any human being. He's alive because through these things we keep him alive.

== Production ==
Rod Serling was particularly pleased with the script for "He's Alive", and was dismayed when he learned that a scene set between Hitler's revealing himself and Vollmer's returning to Hitler was cut out of length constraints. This prompted the idea of doing two versions of "He's Alive": a short version for television, and a longer version for theatrical release as a feature film. His extended script added a number of scenes and even a new protagonist, an FBI agent who investigates Vollmer's neo-Nazi movement, but with The Twilight Zone's budget already stretched to the breaking point, Serling's proposal was turned down. The scene following Hitler revealing himself was filmed, but the footage has since been lost.

Despite his admiration of the script, Serling dislike Dennis Hopper's portrayal of Peter Vollmer, later denouncing it, in a guest lecture at UCLA, as "a most uncontrolled, undisciplined performance."

== Cast ==
- Dennis Hopper as Peter Vollmer
- Ludwig Donath as Ernst Ganz
- Curt Conway as Adolf Hitler
- Paul Mazursky as Frank
- Howard Caine as Nicholas "Nick" Bloss
- Barnaby Hale as Stanley
- Jay Adler as Gibbons
- Wolfe Barzell as Proprietor
- Bernard Fein as Heckler
- Chet Brandenburg as Audience member
- Paul Bryar as Policeman
- Bobby Gilbert as Man with cat
- Buck Harrington as Audience member
- Ed Haskett as Audience member
- Robert McCord as Policeman
- William Meader as Townsman in brawl
- William H. O'Brien as Audience member
- Bill Zuckert as Detective
