= Bernard Fein =

American actor and producer (1926–1980)

- Born: Bernard Jeremiah Fein; November 13, 1926; New York City, U.S.
- Died: September 10, 1980 (aged 53); Los Angeles, California, U.S.
- Occupations: Actor, producer, screenwriter, director
- Years active: 1946 – 1974
- Known for: Co-creating Hogan's Heroes
- Spouse(s): Kay Kurtz m. 1957
- Children: 1

Bernard Jeremiah Fein (November 13, 1926 – September 10, 1980), also known as Bernie Fein, was an American actor, television producer, screenwriter and film director. He is best known for co-creating and associate producing the 1960s television sitcom Hogan's Heroes; a show which he also occasionally wrote for, including the pilot episode. He directed only one film, the 1974 movie View from the Loft.

== Early life and career ==
A native of New York City, born on November 13, 1926, Fein was the son of immigrant furniture maker Irving Fein, later of Albany.

Fein started his career via radio, landing a role in the Schenectady-produced radio drama, The FBI in Action.

Fein's first big break came in 1955 when he landed the recurring role of Pvt. Gomez on Sergeant Bilko which he portrayed through 1959. He appeared regularly as a guest actor on numerous programs from 1959 through 1967 on such shows as The Untouchables, Sea Hunt, The Man from U.N.C.L.E., The Law and Mr. Jones, and Sam Benedict, as well as Lawman, Alfred Hitchcock Presents, 77 Sunset Strip, Perry Mason, The Twilight Zone and The F.B.I.. He also appeared in a handful of films during this time including The Facts of Life and Robin and the 7 Hoods, among others.

Fein is portrayed by Kyle S. More in the 2022 Paramount+ miniseries, The Offer, and by Greg Grunberg later that year in the motion picture, The Fabelmans.

== Personal life and death ==
On May 16, 1957, Fein married actress Kay Kurtz in New York City. They had two sons, Geoffrey and Adam.

Fein died in Los Angeles, on September 10, 1980, at age 53. He was survived by his wife and sons.

== Filmography ==
Year	Title	Role	Notes
1942	Spy Smasher	Sloan	Uncredited
1955–1959	Sergeant Bilko	Private Gomez	137 episodes
1959	Twilight Zone	Mr. Penell	TV series
1959	Keep in Step	Private Gomez	TV movie
1960	The Rise and Fall of Legs Diamond	Frenchy La Marr	Uncredited
1960	The Music Box Kid	Biggie Gaines	
1960	The Facts of Life		Uncredited
1961	Man-Trap	Fat Man	
1961	The Murder Men		Uncredited
1961	Pocketful of Miracles		Uncredited
1964	Robin and the 7 Hoods	Charlie Bananas	
1969	Body Fever	Big Mack	(final film role)

== Notable TV guest appearances ==
- Naked City (January 13, 1959) (Season 1 Episode 16: "Even Crows Sing Good") playing "Dasher"
- Johnny Staccato (December 24, 1959) (Season 1 Episode 15: "The Unwise Men") playing "Ramsey" (as Bernie Fein)
- Johnny Midnight (1960) (Season 1 Episode 10: "The Inner Eye") playing "Sieger"
- Johnny Midnight (1960) (Season 1 Episode 37: "Romeo and Julie") playing "Ravioli"
- The Twilight Zone (January 1, 1960) (Season 1 Episode 13: "The Four of Us Are Dying") playing "Penell"
- Mr. Lucky (January 2, 1960) (Season 1 Episode 11: "Aces Back to Back") playing "Spanish Charley"
- The Untouchables (January 28, 1960) (Season 1 Episode 16: "The St. Louis Story") playing "Tim Harrington" (uncredited)
- Sea Hunt (March 12, 1960) (Season 3 Episode 10: "Expatriate's Return") playing "Boss"
- M Squad (April 5, 1960) (Season 3 Episode 29: "Let There Be Light") playing "John Keefer"
- The Alaskans (May 1, 1960) (Season 1 Episode 30: "Heart of Gold") playing "Tom"
- The Man From Blackhawk (September 9, 1960) (Season 1 Episode 26: "Remember Me Not") playing "Renard"
- Lawman (November 6, 1960) (Season 3 Episode 8: "The Post") playing "Sheriff Sabin"
- Coronado 9 (1960) (Season 1 Episode 9: "Four and Twenty Buddhas") playing "Mason" (as Bernie Fine)
- Coronado 9 (November 29, 1960) (Season 1 Episode 13: "Careless Joe") playing "Frank Fishman"
- Tallahassee 7000 (1961) (Season 1 Episode 18: "Meeting of the Mob") playing "Vincent Aiello"
- Michael Shayne (January 27, 1961) (Season 1 Episode 17: "The Badge") playing "Sid, Fat Thug"
- The Untouchables (February 9, 1961) (Season 2 Episode 17: "Augie "The Banker" Ciamino") playing "Richie"
- Thriller (February 14, 1961) (Season Episode 21: "The Merriweather File") playing "I.L. Gluckman"
- The Law and Mr. Jones (1961) (Season 1 Episode 27: "The Enemy") playing "Lieutenant Rosen"
- The Law and Mr. Jones (May 5, 1961) (Season 1 Episode 28: "One by One") playing "Lieutenant Rosen"
- Thriller (May 16, 1961) (Season 1 Episode 33: "The Terror in Teakwood") playing "Stage Manager"
- The Lawless Years (May 19, 1961) (Season 3 Episode 2: "The Sonny Rosen Story II") playing "Bo"
- Cain's Hundred (as Bernie Fein) (October 17, 1961) (Season 1 Episode 5: "Degrees of Guilt") playing "Hood"
- Alfred Hitchcock Presents (1961) (Season 7 Episode 4: "Cop for a Day") playing "Marty Hersh" (aired October 31, 1961)
- 77 Sunset Strip (November 17, 1961) (Season 4 Episode 9: "The Missing Daddy Caper") playing "Sam Treynor" (as Bernie Fein)
- The Untouchables (November 23, 1961) (Season 3 Episode 7: "Jigsaw") playing "Marty Wilger" (as Bernie Fein)
- Thriller (January 29, 1962) (Season 2 Episode 19: "A Wig for Miss Devore") playing "Lester Clyne"
- Cain's Hundred (1962) (Season 1 Episode 26: "Inside Track") playing "Ben Kilrea"
- The Untouchables (March 29, 1962) (Season 3 Episode 20: "The Maggie Storm Story") playing "Ed Harker"
- The Detectives Starring Robert Taylor (March 30, 1962) (Season 3 Episode 24: "Three Blind Mice: Part 1") playing "Simon Metapuff"
- The Detectives Starring Robert Taylor (April 6, 1962) (Season 3 Episode 25: "Three Blind Mice: Part 2") playing "Simon Metapuff"
- The Tall Man (April 28, 1962) (Season 2 Episode 34: "The Runaway Groom") playing "Sam" (as Bernie Fein)
- The Defenders (October 20, 1962) (Season 2 Episode 6: "Madman: Part 1") playing "Max"
- The Defenders (October 27, 1962) (Season 2 Episode 7: "Madman: Part 2") playing "Max"
- Hawaiian Eye (October 30, 1962) (Season 4 Episode 5: "Lament for a Saturday Warrior") playing "Bane Craig"
- Sam Benedict (November 3, 1962) (Season 1 Episode 8: "Hear the Mellow Wedding Bells") playing "Harry"
- Sam Benedict (December 8, 1962) (Season 1 Episode 13: "Too Many Strangers") playing "Harry Owen"
- The Untouchables (December 18, 1962) (Season 4 Episode 12: "Doublecross") playing "Louie Akers"
- Perry Mason (January 3, 1963) (Season 6 Episode 13: "The Case of the Shoplifter's Shoe") playing "Foreman"
- The Twilight Zone (January 24, 1963) (Season 4 Episode 4: "He's Alive") playing "Heckler"
- The Third Man (July 13, 1963) (Season 4 Episode 12: "An Act of Atonement") playing "Rack Nichols"
- Bob Hope Presents the Chrysler Theatre (December 6, 1963) (Season 1 Episode 9: "The Candidate") playing "Sid Marks"
- The F.B.I. (December 26, 1965) (Season 1 Episode 15: "The Hijackers") playing "Andy Morton"
- The Man from U.N.C.L.E. (October 7, 1966) (Season 3 Episode 4: "The Super Colossal Affair") playing "Frank Cariago"
- Felony Squad (November 15, 1967) (Season 2 Episode 11: "My Mommy Got Lost") playing "Tom Baughmiller"

== Writer ==
- Hogan's Heroes (1965) (TV) (creator)
- The Forgotten Man (1971) (TV)

== Director ==
- View from the Loft (1974)

== Producer ==
- Hogan's Heroes (1965) (TV) (associate producer)
