= MonsterVision =

- Genre: Variety; Horror; Sci-Fi; Fantasy; Comedy
- Directed by: Ellen Hovde; Muffie Meyer; George V. Feta
- Presented by: Penn & Teller; Joe Bob Briggs
- Country of origin: United States
- Original language: English

Original release
- Network: TNT
- Release: June 29, 1991 – September 16, 2000

MonsterVision is an American variety series which aired on TNT from June 29, 1991, to September 16, 2000. The show underwent multiple changes throughout its over nine-year run. The program acted as a marathon of older horror, science fiction, or fantasy films. Initially, MonsterVision revolved around a mysterious claymation-style moon character who was featured in the bumpers alongside a creepy-sounding disembodied voice, who served as the narrator for the show and its promos. Additionally, the show was regularly paired alongside the series 100% Weird, which brought viewers even more bizarre films. Later, in June 1993, entertainment duo Penn & Teller guest-hosted MonsterVision marathons featuring mainly old B-Movies from the 1950s and 1960s. Then, by Saturday, July 31, 1993, the narrator of the series became solely a voice-over announcer.

From 1996 until around the show's cancellation in 2000, the series was hosted by Joe Bob Briggs, and featured mainly classic horror and schlock films from the 1970s to the 1990s. Here, much of the original formatting under Briggs was derived from his earlier work on The Movie Channel program, Joe Bob's Drive-in Theater. Yet, this series would also incorporate Joe Bob's Last Call, a segment that presented that night's final film. Then, in 1999, the overall program became styled as Joe Bob's Hollywood Saturday Night and MonsterVision, before ultimately returning to its non-host format in mid-2000.

== Format and series overview ==
=== Pre-Joe Bob Briggs (1991–1996) ===
When MonsterVision premiered on Saturday, June 29, 1991, it was little more than a marathon of older horror, science fiction, or fantasy films beginning at 8:00 PM ET and ending well into the early morning. With a claymation-style moon character serving as the original narrator and 'host,' broadcasts tended to air monthly, as well as on certain holidays. Films often fit a general theme, such as "TNT Salutes The Outer Limits," "Halloween Night," "Attack of the Sea Monsters," "A Christmas Nightmare," "Harryhausen Havoc," or recurring "Godzilla Marathons," although other occasions had somewhat unrelated choices. Additionally, MonsterVision sometimes had special events, such as their "Dracula Weekend," which had a mini-interview with Christopher Lee in honor of the release of Bram Stoker's Dracula (1992). A number of later marathons, beginning on Saturday, June 5, 1993, were presented by the well-known entertainment duo Penn & Teller, before the show then transitioned to voice-over narration for the remaining duration of this period.

=== Joe Bob Briggs era (1996–2000) ===
Beginning on Friday, June 28, 1996, Joe Bob Briggs (John Bloom), the drive-in movie critic, became the official host of MonsterVision, with the series transitioning into a regularly scheduled Friday time slot, every week at 11:00 PM ET. MonsterVision would typically show no more than two films per night, though several episodes were much longer, such as the 1997 "Super Bowl Sunday Special," which consisted of sixteen continuous hours of horror movies. That being said, on usual double feature nights, Joe Bob would appear anywhere between sixteen and twenty-four times throughout the movies, significantly more than he did on his previous program, Joe Bob's Drive-In Theater. In these segments, Briggs would discuss the films, and more, from the inside and outside of a staged trailer home with a green neon TNT sign in the background. Joe Bob was also frequently visited by one of a succession of 'mail girls,' including Honey (Honey Michelle Gregory), Reno, Kat (Kathy Shower), Summer (Cheryl Bartel), and Rusty (Renner St. John), who not only served as attractive, comedic 'sidekicks,' but also brought Briggs fan letters, sometimes from actual prisoners. TNT also added the segment Joe Bob's Last Call, which was used to showcase the final movie of the night. Similarly, the program was occasionally able to feature guests such as rapper and actor Ice-T, and directors Wes Craven and John Waters.

When it came to the movies themselves, MonsterVision, under Briggs, would sometimes stray away from the typical horror and science fiction films, showing westerns, blaxploitation, kung fu, dramas, comedies, and other film genres, specifically in the later years. Additionally, as a way to connect fans further to the movies being presented during episodes, MonsterVision was known for its early use of the internet at tnt.turner.com/monstervision. There, fans were able to chat in Joe Bob's Rec Room, participate in weekly caption contests to win T-shirts, take part in "Find That Flick" contests to win obscure films, send fan mail, see images from the set, get free postcards, learn more about Joe Bob, and find out about upcoming films. Nevertheless, before each movie, Briggs would often give the audience his formal on-air "Drive-in Totals," a list of what he considered to be the most notable, gory, or humorous points in the film, followed by a rating of up to four stars, usually all delivered in a deadpan style. Additionally, he frequently played on the term "kung fu" to describe unique action sequences, such as 'Quicksand Fu' in Mad Max Beyond Thunderdome. Briggs' introduction to Phantasm II, for example, comprised:

"Twelve dead bodies. Exploding house. One four-barreled sawed-off shotgun. Dwarf tossing. Ten breasts. (Of course, those are SCISSORED OUT of the TNT version.) Embalming needles plunged through various parts of various bodies. One motor vehicle chase, with crash and burn. Ear-lopping. Forehead-drilling. Wrist-hacking. Bimbo-flinging. Grandma-bashing. Devil sex. Crematorium Fu. Flamethrower Fu. ★★★★"

After each commercial break, Joe Bob would deliver a diverting short or long monologue concerning observations he made about the film, as well as popular culture, society, and his thoughts about life in general. These could be more serious discussions, for example, of trivia concerning obscure film actors, or controversies such as the race debates surrounding films such as Big Trouble in Little China. Conversely, Briggs' pieces could be more lighthearted, with deliberately outrageous political statements and occasional banter with his film crew. Joe Bob frequently described his notional day-to-day activities, including supposed problems with his girlfriends (or lack thereof) and his four ex-wives (usually the fourth, "Wanda Bodeine"). Lastly, Briggs usually signed off each episode of MonsterVision with a casual debriefing on the movie just-ended, along with a series of deliberately bad jokes, and a reminder that "the drive-in will never die!"

Furthermore, during these sections, Briggs routinely criticized and lampooned TNT's censorship of the films, with frequent reference to the channel's owner, Ted Turner. This running gag culminated with a Halloween marathon of Friday the 13th movies, which portrayed strange occurrences throughout the night, leading to Joe Bob realizing that Turner was trying to 'kill' him. The final scene saw Joe Bob give an impassioned apology to Turner, claiming he was an amazing person, before the video feed cut off eerily. A similar stunt was staged in Blair Witch Project-themed scenes for a later horror marathon, with the host mysteriously missing.

Beginning on Saturday, June 7, 1997, the series moved to Saturday nights in order to avoid further conflicts with TNT sports broadcasts. Then, on Saturday, September 11, 1999, the program was almost completely revamped in order to attract a wider audience, particular more women, resulting in the creation of Joe Bob's Hollywood Saturday Night and MonsterVision. Moving from Dallas to Los Angeles, not only was the general aesthetic of the show changed to feel more 'Hollywood,' but the first film of each episode going forward tended to be more 'mainstream,' while the second was usually in accordance with traditional MonsterVision. Subsequently, this meant that the Joe Bob’s Last Call segment would be dropped altogether. Although the original formula of the program was now changed, this transition allowed for more guests, such as Rhonda Shear, and horror movie specials still remained a staple of the show. Nonetheless, possibly due to a decline in ratings, TNT was unable to fully justify the increased budget after the move to Los Angeles, thus shifting to a one-movie-a-night format starting on Saturday, January 15, 2000.

== Cancellation and Shudder revival ==
Joe Bob Briggs hosted MonsterVision for a little over four years, and his presence was the main reason many fans tuned-in. However, the show's format change hinted at the eventual breakdown of the MonsterVision series. Briggs himself has stated that he believes TNT's scheduling of fewer horror and drive-in movies may have led to the program's fall. With that being said, on Saturday, July 8, 2000, Joe Bob unknowingly hosted MonsterVision for the last time when he aired Children of the Corn II: The Final Sacrifice. Days later, Briggs received a letter from TNT management, stating that "his services were no longer needed." Afterwards, the show returned to its original non-host format, the program's final transition. Yet, fans never received any sort of on-air closure, only officially learning about Joe Bob's departure through the main website. MonsterVision was then eventually removed from TNT's lineup after Saturday, September 16, 2000.

Briggs has since remained an active speaker and writer, and has contributed commentary tracks to several DVDs.

However, over 17 years since its cancellation, Briggs stated that Shudder had shown some interest in reviving MonsterVision. This ultimately resulted in Joe Bob's return to television in a marathon for the Shudder TV live feed. On Friday, July 13, 2018, at 9 PM EDT / 6 PM PDT, Shudder aired a roughly 26-hour and 35-minute special featuring 13 of the greatest horror movies of all time as chosen by Briggs himself. Despite some technical difficulties, these films included: Tourist Trap, Sleepaway Camp, Rabid, The Prowler, Sorority Babes in the Slimeball Bowl-O-Rama, Daughters of Darkness, Blood Feast, Basket Case, Re-Animator, Demons, The Legend of Boggy Creek, Hellraiser, and Pieces. Although there were no commercials, these movies contained several interruptions for Joe Bob's legendary "Drive-in Totals," insider stories, and amusing tangential rants. Additionally, these segments also included Darcy the Mail Girl (Diana Prince), who not only showed up in movie-themed outfits to banter with Joe Bob and bring him messages from fans, but also spent the entire time live-tweeting with viewers. Lastly, as with MonsterVision, the marathon had guests, including Felissa Rose during Sleepaway Camp and Lyle Blackburn for The Legend of Boggy Creek.

Following the unprecedented success of the "July 2018 Marathon," on Tuesday, September 5, 2018, Shudder announced that they had made the decision to greenlight two more specials for 2018, as well as The Last Drive-in with Joe Bob Briggs series beginning in 2019.

== Films shown by Penn and Teller on MonsterVision ==
- King Kong
- Them!
- Attack of the 50 Foot Woman
- Queen of Outer Space
- The Manster
- Plan 9 from Outer Space
- Mysterious Island
- The Outer Limits (1963 TV series)
- Billy the Kid Versus Dracula
- Night of the Lepus
- The Golden Voyage of Sinbad
- Sinbad and the Eye of the Tiger
- The Howling
- Clash of the Titans
- The Thing
- Frankenstein

== Films shown by Joe Bob Briggs on MonsterVision ==
- Donovan's Brain
- Them!
- The Creeping Unknown
- Forbidden Planet
- Godzilla, King of the Monsters!
- Godzilla vs. Mothra
- Godzilla vs. Monster Zero
- Attack of the 50 Foot Woman
- It! The Terror from Beyond Space
- The Time Machine
- The Birds
- The Outer Limits: "Cold Hands, Warm Heart"
- The Outer Limits: "I, Robot"
- Four Days in November
- She (1965)
- Village of the Giants
- The Silencers
- Seconds
- One Million Years B.C.
- Prehistoric Women
- When Dinosaurs Ruled the Earth
- The Fearless Vampire Killers
- Planet of the Apes
- Escape from the Planet of the Apes
- Conquest of the Planet of the Apes
- Project X
- Rosemary's Baby
- Look What's Happened to Rosemary's Baby
- Barbarella
- The Valley of Gwangi
- Hercules in New York
- Tribes
- Billy Jack
- Shaft
- Willy Wonka & the Chocolate Factory
- Play Misty for Me
- Duel
- The Doberman Gang
- Night of the Lepus
- The Legend of Boggy Creek
- Hammer
- Superbeast
- The Horror at 37,000 Feet
- Theatre of Blood
- Genesis II
- High Plains Drifter
- Soylent Green
- Cleopatra Jones
- American Graffiti
- The Neptune Factor
- The Golden Voyage of Sinbad
- Sinbad and the Eye of the Tiger
- The Exorcist
- Exorcist II: The Heretic
- It's Alive
- It Lives Again
- It's Alive III: Island of the Alive
- Jaws
- Jaws 2
- The Devil's Rain
- The Master Gunfighter
- The Ultimate Warrior
- The Omen
- Logan's Run
- Burnt Offerings
- Carrie
- King Kong
- King Kong Lives
- Overlords of the U.F.O.
- Black Sunday
- Orca
- Damnation Alley
- Coma
- The Fury
- Capricorn One
- The Swarm
- Invasion of the Body Snatchers
- The Warriors
- Phantasm
- Phantasm II
- Alien
- Alien 3
- Time After Time
- Salem's Lot
- Star Trek: The Motion Picture
- Star Trek II: The Wrath of Khan
- The Fog
- Saturn 3
- When Time Ran Out
- Friday the 13th
- Friday the 13th Part 2
- Friday the 13th Part III
- Friday the 13th: The Final Chapter
- Friday the 13th: A New Beginning
- Friday the 13th Part VI: Jason Lives
- The Long Riders
- The Blues Brothers
- Alcatraz: The Whole Shocking Story
- Smokey and the Bandit II
- The Elephant Man
- Somewhere in Time
- Motel Hell
- Midnight Offerings
- The Funhouse
- The Monster Club
- Excalibur
- The Hand
- Clash of the Titans
- Dragonslayer
- Halloween II
- Halloween III: Season of the Witch
- Mad Max 2
- Mad Max Beyond Thunderdome
- The Beast Within
- Swamp Thing
- Death Valley
- Conan the Barbarian
- Conan the Destroyer
- Red Sonja
- Creepshow
- Poltergeist
- Poltergeist II: The Other Side
- Poltergeist III
- Megaforce
- The Beastmaster
- Beastmaster 2: Through the Portal of Time
- Beastmaster III: The Eye of Braxus
- Endangered Species
- Tootsie
- WarGames
- Trading Places
- 2020 Texas Gladiators
- Twilight Zone: The Movie
- Metalstorm: The Destruction of Jared-Syn
- Deathstalker
- The Dead Zone
- Endgame
- Christine
- Warrior of the Lost World
- The NeverEnding Story
- Gremlins
- The Last Starfighter
- Red Dawn
- The Company of Wolves
- Razorback
- She (1984)
- Trancers
- Ghoulies
- Ghoulies II
- The Goonies
- Cocoon
- Back to the Future
- The Protector
- National Lampoon's European Vacation
- Pee Wee's Big Adventure
- The Return of the Living Dead
- Return of the Living Dead Part II
- Teen Wolf
- Zone Troopers
- Rocky IV
- Highlander
- Troll
- Critters
- Breeders
- The Deliberate Stranger
- Top Gun
- Big Trouble in Little China
- Maximum Overdrive
- Howard the Duck
- The Fly
- Deadly Friend
- From Beyond
- Slaughter High
- The Wraith
- Little Shop of Horrors
- Future Hunters
- The Stepfather
- Timestalkers
- Dirty Dancing
- The Gate
- Predator
- Spaceballs
- Dragnet
- Adventures in Babysitting
- The Lost Boys
- Steel Dawn
- Howling III
- Howling: New Moon Rising
- Batteries Not Included
- The Serpent and the Rainbow
- Hairspray
- Beetlejuice
- The Seventh Sign
- The Great Outdoors
- Waxwork
- The Kiss
- They Live
- Child's Play
- Child's Play 2
- Twins
- Parents
- Leviathan
- Communion
- Nightbreed
- Xtro II: The Second Encounter
- Peacemaker
- Fear
- Night of the Living Dead
- Look Who's Talking Too
- The Guyver
- Mannequin Two: On the Move
- Don't Tell Mom the Babysitter's Dead
- The Sitter
- Hot Shots!
- The People Under the Stairs
- Strays
- Aces: Iron Eagle III
- House IV
- Poison Ivy
- Poison Ivy II: Lily
- Twin Peaks: Fire Walk with Me
- A League of Their Own
- Project: Shadowchaser
- Prelude to a Kiss
- Tiger Claws
- Buffy the Vampire Slayer
- Raising Cain
- Children of the Corn II: The Final Sacrifice
- The Unnamable II: The Statement of Randolph Carter
- Bram Stoker's Dracula
- Love Potion No. 9
- Frankenstein
- Chained Heat II
- Time Runner
- Point of No Return
- Robin Hood: Men in Tights
- My Boyfriend's Back
- Needful Things
- The Hidden II
- Warlock: The Armageddon
- Skeeter
- Malice
- Look Who's Talking Now
- Philadelphia Experiment II
- Man's Best Friend
- Surviving the Game
- Hercules and the Amazon Women
- Immortal Combat
- CyberTracker
- The Shawshank Redemption
- Wes Craven's New Nightmare
- Mary Shelley's Frankenstein
- Replikator
- In the Mouth of Madness
- Pet Shop
- Project Metalbeast
- The Surgeon
- Dolores Claiborne
- Sleepstalker
- Cyberjack
- Ice Cream Man
- Galaxis
- Embrace of the Vampire
- To the Limit
- Voodoo
- The American President
- Dracula: Dead and Loving It
- Grim
- Fargo
- Heaven's Prisoners
- Within the Rock
- The Nutty Professor
- Theodore Rex
- Joe's Apartment
- Mars Attacks!
- Body Armor
