= Joe Bob Goes to the Drive In =

Book by Joe Bob Briggs (pen name of John Bloom)

Joe Bob Goes to the Drive In is the first book by John Bloom under the pen name Joe Bob Briggs. It consists of his movie reviews written between 1982 and 1985.

Joe Bob was Bloom's satirical creation, allowing him to spoof stereotypical "redneck" Texan values while giving genuine praise to schlock films. It was not widely known until he was fired in 1985 that Briggs was not, in fact, a real person.

Joe Bob exclusively viewed movies in drive-ins, in his Oldsmobile Toronado with any one of several girlfriends. According to his column, he has four ex-wives, and is always on the lookout for "ex-wife number five". An entire fictional cast of characters popped up over the period of the column, who would often be mentioned in the story along with the movie reviews.

The entire book is made up of columns and shorter segments called "Joe Bob's Mailbag," when Joe Bob writes back to his fans, and often his critics. The only two people who actually appear in the first person are Joe Bob and Stephen King, who saw several of his books made into movies during that period and actually wrote the introduction to the book when it was compiled and published in 1987.

Joe Bob/Bloom lived in Texas during the duration of both this book and its sequel, Joe Bob Goes Back to the Drive In. At first his column appeared solely in The Dallas Times-Herald, but was eventually syndicated before Joe Bob was dropped completely. This event actually signals the end of the book, when Joe Bob states that he had been 'killed'.
