= Blood Shack =

1971 American horror film

- VHS cover
- Directed by: Ray Dennis Steckler
- Written by: Ray Dennis Steckler
- Starring: Carolyn Brandt; Ron Haydock
- Release date: 1971
- Running time: 70 minutes (theatrical); 55 minutes (home video)
- Country: United States
- Language: English

Blood Shack (also known as The Chooper and Curse of the Evil Spirit) is a 1971 American horror film written and directed by Ray Dennis Steckler (under the pseudonym Wolfgang Schmidt), and starring Steckler's then-wife Carolyn Brandt alongside Ron Haydock.

== Cast ==
- Carolyn Brandt as Carol
- Ron Haydock as Tim
- Jason Wayne as Daniel
- Laurel Spring as Connie
- John Bates as Charlie
- Steve Edwards as Constable
- Linda Steckler as Margie
- Laura Steckler as Barbra

== Production ==
The film was produced on a budget of "five hundred dollars tops". Filming took place in Pahrump, Nevada, and according to Steckler, the furnishings of the titular shack were property that had been left behind by a previous tenant. The black suit worn by the "Chooper", which was too small for Haydock, was recycled from a previous Steckler production, Lemon Grove Kids Meet the Monsters. The killer was called the "Chooper" after the repetitive "choop" sounds made by the suit's wearer during the "Green Grasshopper" segment of The Lemon Grove Kids.

== Release ==
Under the title The Chooper, the film received a limited theatrical release, playing in one theater in Denver, Colorado. It was also released on VHS under this title. For home video, the film was cut down from 70 minutes to 55 minutes, then re-scored and retitled Blood Shack.
