= Peaceful Valley Donkey Rescue =

US nonprofit organization

- Formation: 2000
- Founder: Mark Meyers; Amy Meyers
- Type: 501(c)(3) Nonprofit
- Purpose: Animal rescue
- Location: San Angelo, Texas
- Website: donkeyrescue.org

Peaceful Valley Donkey Rescue is a 501(c)(3) nonprofit donkey rescue organization based in San Angelo, Texas. It is the largest donkey rescue organization in the United States with 24 sanctuaries and 26 adoption centers nationwide. It shelters around 3,000 donkeys, providing food, water, medical care, gentling, training, and adoption services. The organization has rescued a total of over 8,000 donkeys.

Peaceful Valley Donkey Rescue was founded in 2000 by husband and wife, Mark and Amy Meyers, on their small ranch in Acton, California. It received nonprofit status in January 2001. By October of that year, the organization had rescued 40 donkeys and adopted out half of those. In 2005, Mark and Amy Meyers moved the operation to an almost 100-acre property near Tehachapi, California. By 2006, the property held around 250 rescued donkeys.

In 2008, the organization entered into an agreement with the Texas Parks and Wildlife Department to rescue feral or abandoned donkeys in Big Bend Ranch State Park. In 2011, it was responsible for nearly 800 donkey rescues, 700 of which occurred in Texas. In 2012, Peaceful Valley Donkey Rescue moved its main headquarters to a 172-acre facility (a former dairy farm) in San Angelo, Texas. It was operating 15 adoption centers serving 27 states by 2013.

The organization earned accreditation from the Global Federation of Animal Sanctuaries in July 2016. In May 2018, it entered into an agreement with the National Park Service to rescue and remove up to 2,500 wild donkeys from Death Valley National Park and the Mojave National Preserve as part of the Wild Burro Project.
