= The Thrill Killers =

- Theatrical release poster
- Directed by: Ray Dennis Steckler
- Written by: Gene Pollock; Ray Dennis Steckler
- Produced by: George J. Morgan; Ray Dennis Steckler
- Starring: Ray Dennis Steckler; Liz Renay
- Narrated by: Coleman Francis
- Cinematography: Joseph V. Mascelli; Lee Strosnider
- Edited by: Austin McKinney
- Music by: André Brummer
- Production company: Morgan-Steckler Productions
- Distributed by: Hollywood Star Pictures
- Release dates: August 7, 1964 (West Germany); January 21, 1966 (United States)
- Running time: 69 minutes
- Country: United States
- Language: English

The Thrill Killers is a 1964 American horror film directed by Ray Dennis Steckler. It stars Steckler (billed as "Cash Flagg") and Liz Renay.

The film centers on several psychotic murderers who escape a mental institution and go on a killing spree in Los Angeles.

== Plot ==
Joe Saxon (Joe Bardo) is an aspiring actor whose outlandish parties and spending worry his wife, Liz (Liz Renay).

In another scene, we see a young, Greek immigrant named Dennis Kesdekian (Atlas King) kisses his wife and family good-bye as he leaves for another day at work. Kesdeckian sees a hitchhiker (Steckler) and offers to give him a ride. The hitchhiker shoots the man and steals his car.

That night, Joe throws a party at his house. He and Liz do not know most of the people who attend, but it is part of Joe's plan to wine and dine producer George Morgan (himself), whose next picture Joe desperately wants a part in.

On the other side of town, the hitchhiker has picked up a nightclub dancer/prostitute (Erina Enyo) and takes her back to her apartment, where he brutally murders her with a pair of scissors.

While Joe and Liz are arguing, they hear of the murders over the radio, and learn that the assailant was Mort "Mad Dog" Click, long wanted by the police for similar crimes. Also on the loose are three mental patients who have escaped from the local asylum.

The next day, Liz decides to leave Joe and drives out to her cousin Linda's restaurant up in the hills. At the restaurant, Linda (Laura Benedict) congratulates her friends Ron (Ron Burr) and Carol (Carolyn Brandt) on their marriage and purchase of a nearby house. Liz pulls in just after the couple leave.

Ron and Carol get to their new house and look around. When they find their handyman missing, they look out back at a smaller house on the property, where they find him decapitated by the escaped mental patients—the axe-wielding Keith (Keith O'Brien), Herbie (Herb Robbins) and Gary (Gary Kent). Ron is decapitated in front of Carol, and then after some amount of chasing around the property, Carol is disposed of in a similar fashion.

Joe and Morgan show up at Linda's restaurant, as do the three killers. Herbie calls his friend, who turns out to be Click, to come by and get rid of the two others. When Liz and Joe realize who the three are, the killers hold them hostage. Linda poisons Herbie's coffee and kills him, while Gary chases Liz outside up in the hills.

While Linda and Morgan phone for the police, Joe follows the Gary and Liz up into the hills and a battle between Gary and Joe takes place on a mountain-top. Liz goes to get help, but is picked up and kidnapped by Click, who is now on the scene. Gary is pushed off a cliff and falls to his death. Joe, from afar, sees Liz get into Click's car, unaware that the man driving her is also a madman.

Liz escapes Click's clutches as the police arrive and take chase. Click shoots a camper and steals his horse, and heads further up to the hills on horseback, chased after by a motor patrolman. After a furious gun battle, Click is shot to death.

Sometime after the events have taken place, Joe has sworn off acting, until he gets a call from Morgan that he wants him (at $2,500 a week) to star in his picture opposite his newest discovery, Miss Transylvania—Linda!

== Cast ==
- Ray Dennis Steckler as Mort "Mad Dog" Click
- Liz Renay as Liz Saxon
- Joseph Bardo as Joe Saxon
- Carolyn Brandt as Carol
- Gary Kent as Gary Barcroft
- Herb Robins as Herbie Click
- Keith O'Brien as Keith Rogers
- Laura Benedict as Linda
- Ron Burr as Ron
- Erina Enyo as Erina Devore
- Atlas King as Dennis Kesdekian
- Nancy Crawford as Mrs. Kesdekian

== Release ==
=== Home media ===
The Thrill Killers was released on DVD by Shriek Show on November 16, 2004. It was later released by Guilty Pleasures on September 4, 2007, as a part of a four-disk "Midnight Movies Collection".

== Reception ==
TV Guide awarded the film a negative one out of five stars, noting the film's low budget while admitting that the film was entertaining. Joseph A. Ziemba from The Bleeding Skull gave the film a positive review, writing, "Equally intense, humorous, and shocking, The Thrill Killers does the impossible. While radiating innocent charm through its use of bongos and small scale sets, the film pulls off a feat which very few horror films from this era can still accomplish: it’s unsettling." On his website Fantastic Movie Musings and Ramblings, Dave Sindelar gave the film a mixed review. While commending Steckler for his performance and direction of the film's attack scenes, Sindelar stated that the film was undercut by a weak story, a lack of convincing characters and overall campiness.
