= Bob Burns III =

American actor, archivist and historian (1935–2025)

- Born: May 12, 1935
- Died: December 12, 2025 (aged 90)
- Occupations: Actor, consultant, producer, archivist and historian
- Known for: Bob's Basement: a collection of movie props, particularly from horror and science-fiction movies
- Notable work: Invasion of the Saucer Men; Lemon Grove Kids Meet the Monsters; Rat Pfink a Boo Boo
- Spouse: Kathy Burns (died 2021)

Bob Burns III (May 12, 1935 – December 12, 2025) was an American actor, consultant, producer, archivist historian and collector of props, costumes and paraphernalia from science fiction, fantasy and horror motion pictures. His acting roles include Tracy the Gorilla in the 1975 television show The Ghost Busters.

== Bob's Basement ==
"Bob's Basement" is Burns's collection of props, costumes, and other memorabilia, described by the New York Times as the "premier film museum in the Los Angeles area, though it is not open to the public and has no regular hours." Contents include the last surviving 18-inch armature model used in the 1933 film King Kong, costumes from Republic Pictures serials of the 1940s (including Roy Barcroft's costume from The Purple Monster Strikes), masks made by special make-up effects creator Rick Baker, and the original Time Machine from the 1960 film.

Burns had one of the largest private collections of memorabilia from the Alien franchise. A short documentary about his collection was included in the 2003 Alien Quadrilogy DVD collection.

== Work with Paul Blaisdell ==
Burns was friends with special effects technician Paul Blaisdell for many years, and assisted him on AIP films including Invasion of the Saucer Men (1957). Burns and Blaisdell co-published a monster magazine in the early 1960s called Fantastic Monsters of the Films.

== Beast Wishes ==
Beast Wishes, by Frank Dietz and Trish Geiger, is "a documentary film about a man, a gorilla... and a woman who loves them both!" It honors the work of Bob Burns. Clips were shown at the Monsterpalooza convention in 2012, with Burns present as a panelist.

== Personal life and death ==
Burns was married to Kathy Burns, who predeceased him in 2021. He died on December 12, 2025, at the age of 90.

== Filmography ==
- Invasion of the Saucer Men (1957)
- Lemon Grove Kids Meet the Monsters (1965)
- Rat Pfink a Boo Boo (1966)
- Superman vs. the Gorilla Gang (1965) – Kogar the Gorilla
- The Further Adventures of Major Mars (1976)
- The Ghost Busters as "Tracy, The Gorilla" with Forrest Tucker and Larry Storch on the CBS-TV Series 1975 but is credited as the one who "trained" Tracy.
- The Further Adventures of Major Mars (1976) (uncredited) – Major Mars
- Robot Monster: Special Edition (1982) (TV)
- Drive (1997) – Doctor/Co-pilot
- Invasion Earth: The Aliens Are Here (1988) – Muffo
- "Mac Tonight" Character puppeteering for, promotion for McDonald's television Commercials (1989–1990)
- Forrest J. Ackerman's Amazing Worlds of Science Fiction & Fantasy (1991) (Direct to video) – Himself
- The Vampire Hunters Club (2001) (Video) – Bob
- The Universe According to Universal (2002) (DVD extra for It Came From Outer Space)
- Monster Kid Home Movies (2005) (Video) – Various roles ("The Alien", "The Monster")
- The Sky Is Falling: Making 'The War of the Worlds' (2005) (DVD Extra)
- The Naked Monster (2005) – Admiral Burns/Tracy the Gorilla
- King Kong (2005) – NY Bystander
- Dark and Stormy Night (2009) – Kogar the Gorilla
- The Lovely Bones (2009) – Mall Shopper

== Audio commentaries ==
- The Creature Walks Among Us, with film historian Tom Weaver
- The Fly II, with director Chris Walas
- Frankenstein 1970, with actress Charlotte Austin and film historian Tom Weaver
- Godzilla Raids Again, with film historians Steve Ryfle, Ed Godziszewski, and Stuart Galbraith IV
- The Mummy, with film historians Rick Baker, Scott Essman, Steven Haberman, and Brent Armstrong
- Revenge of the Creature, with actress Lori Nelson and film historian Tom Weaver
- The War of the Worlds, with filmmaker Joe Dante and film historian Bill Warren
- The White Gorilla, with film historian Tom Weaver
- The Bride and the Beast, with actors Charlotte Austin and Slick Slavin and film historian Tom Weaver
