= The Incredibly Strange Creatures Who Stopped Living and Became Mixed-Up Zombies =

1964 film by Ray Dennis Steckler

- Theatrical release poster
- Directed by: Ray Dennis Steckler
- Screenplay by: Gene Pollock; Robert Silliphant
- Story by: E. M. Kevke
- Produced by: Ray Dennis Steckler
- Starring: Ray Dennis Steckler; Carolyn Brandt; Brett O'Hara; Atlas King; Sharon Walsh; Pat Kirkwood
- Cinematography: Joseph V. Mascelli
- Edited by: Don Schneider
- Music by: André Brummer; Libby Quinn
- Distributed by: Fairway International Pictures
- Release date: February 10, 1964
- Running time: 82 minutes
- Country: United States
- Language: English
- Budget: $38,000

The Incredibly Strange Creatures Who Stopped Living and Became Mixed-Up Zombies (sometimes "!!?" is appended to the title and shortened to The Incredibly Strange Creatures) is a 1964 American horror monster movie produced and directed by Ray Dennis Steckler. Steckler also starred in the film, credited under the pseudonym "Cash Flagg".

In the film, three friends visit a carnival and stumble onto a group of occultists and disfigured monsters. Produced on a $38,000 budget, much of it takes place at The Pike amusement park in Long Beach, California, which resembles Brooklyn's Coney Island. The film was billed as the first "monster musical," beating out The Horror of Party Beach by a mere month in release date. Interspersed throughout the film are several song-and-dance performances in the carnival's nightclub, with songs such as "Choo Choo Ch'Boogie" and "Shook Out of Shape".

Upon release, the film received negative reviews and is regarded by some critics as being one of the worst movies ever made. The film was lampooned in a 1997 episode of the cult sci-fi TV series Mystery Science Theater 3000.

== Plot ==
Free-spirited Jerry, his girlfriend Angela, and his buddy Harold head out for a day at a seaside carnival. In one venue, a dance number is performed by Marge, a superstitious alcoholic who drinks before and between shows, and her partner, Bill Ward, for a small audience. Backstage, Marge sees a black cat and, disturbed by its appearance, visits carnival fortune-teller Estrella to find out what it means. In her fortune-telling booth, Estrella predicts death for Marge, who runs out terrified, past Jerry, Angela, and Harold. The three decide to have their fortunes told. Estrella predicts "a death near water" for someone close to Angela.

After leaving Estrella's booth, Jerry sees Estrella's sister Carmelita, a stripper who hypnotizes him with her icy stare, and he is compelled to see her act. Disgusted, Angela leaves the carnival with Harold in tow. After the show, Jerry is tricked backstage into Estrella's room with a note. She uses the opportunity to turn Jerry into a zombie by hypnotizing him with a spiral wheel. Jerry then goes on a violent overnight rampage of which he will have no memory, killing Marge and fatally wounding Bill. The next day, Jerry attempts to strangle his girlfriend Angela as well. It is revealed that Estrella and her henchman Ortega have been turning carnival patrons into zombies by throwing acid into their faces, disfiguring them, and then imprisoning them in her fortune-telling booth.

Jerry, suspicious of his fragmented mental state, confronts Estrella at the carnival. He is hypnotized a second time, and that night stabs a carnival showgirl and barker in the showgirl's home. Returning to Estrella, she throws acid in Jerry's face and attempts to imprison him, only to have her other zombies escape. The zombies immediately kill Estrella, Carmelita, Ortega, and several performers before being shot by police. Jerry, himself partially disfigured but not completely a zombie, escapes the carnival and is pursued to the shoreline, where the police shoot him dead in front of Angela and Harold. Estrella's prediction of "a death near water" for someone close to Angela is fulfilled.

== Cast ==
- Ray Dennis Steckler as Jerry (credited as Cash Flagg)
- Carolyn Brandt as Marge Neilson
- Brett O'Hara as Madam Estrella
- Atlas King as Harold
- Sharon Walsh as Angela
- Pat Kirkwood as Madison (credited as Madison Clarke)
- Erina Enyo as Carmelita
- Toni Camel as Stella
- Don Russell as Ortega (credited as Jack Brady)
- William Turner as Bill Ward (credited as Bill Ward)

== Production and release ==
=== Title ===
At the time of release, The Incredibly Strange Creatures Who Stopped Living and Became Mixed-Up Zombies was the second-longest titled film in the horror genre (Roger Corman's The Saga of the Viking Women and Their Voyage to the Waters of the Great Sea Serpent being the first; both were parodied by Mystery Science Theater 3000).

This was not, however, the title originally intended for the film. As Steckler relates, the film was supposed to be entitled The Incredibly Strange Creatures, or Why I Stopped Living and Became a Mixed-Up Zombie, but was changed in response to Columbia Pictures' threat of a lawsuit over the name's similarity to Dr. Strangelove or: How I Learned to Stop Worrying and Love the Bomb, which was under production at the same time. Steckler later joked that he could have made 5 movies for what they probably spent on lawyers.

The film was originally released by Fairway-International Pictures, Arch Hall Sr.'s studio, who put it on the lower half of a double bill with one of his own pictures. Dissatisfied, Steckler bought the distribution rights back from Hall and purchased the rights to a Coleman Francis picture that was also featured on Mystery Science Theater 3000, The Beast of Yucca Flats. The film was ultimately released in the U.S. as a roadshow theatrical picture. In order to get repeat customers, Steckler retitled the film numerous times, with titles such as The Incredibly Mixed-Up Zombie, Diabolical Dr. Voodoo, and The Teenage Psycho Meets Bloody Mary.

=== Studio ===
Much of the movie was filmed in an old, long-empty Masonic temple in Glendale, California, owned by actor Rock Hudson. The nine-story building was a series of makeshift "sound stages" stacked floor after floor, some big enough to create the midway scenes indoors. This was the studio that was used that year for the production of The Creeping Terror, another low-quality monster movie also spoofed by Mystery Science Theater 3000. The Film Center Studios were popular with non-union producers because they could turn off the elevator to lock out IATSE union agents, who found it difficult to climb the stairs to the seventh-floor main stage.

=== Budget ===
During the filming of the movie, Steckler was in need of funds, both for production costs as well as living expenses. Atlas King, who had grown close to Steckler, gave him three hundred dollars out of his own pocket. The station wagon Jerry drives in the film was the Steckler family car.

=== Notable cast and crew ===
Brett O'Hara was usually a stand-in for Susan Hayward. Madame Estrella was the only "real" role of her career.

Sharon Walsh was not originally meant to play Angela. Bonita Jade was given the role, but when it was time for her scene, she said she had to leave to meet her drummer boyfriend because he was performing and she always went to his gigs. Steckler was furious, and he pulled Walsh out of the chorus line, telling her she was now the female lead. Walsh had already appeared in several dance numbers during the movie and they had to "disguise" her with a new, "beehive" hairstyle.

The cinematography/camera operation was done by three men who would go on to become major figures in cinematography: Joseph V. Mascelli, author of The Five Cs of Cinematography; Vilmos Zsigmond (credited as William Zsigmond), who would later win an Academy Award for his work on Close Encounters of the Third Kind; and László Kovács (credited as Leslie Kovacs).

In some screenings, employees in monster masks—sometimes including Steckler himself—would run into the theater to scare the audience (the gimmick was billed as "Hallucinogenic Hypnovision" on the film's posters).

== Reception and legacy ==
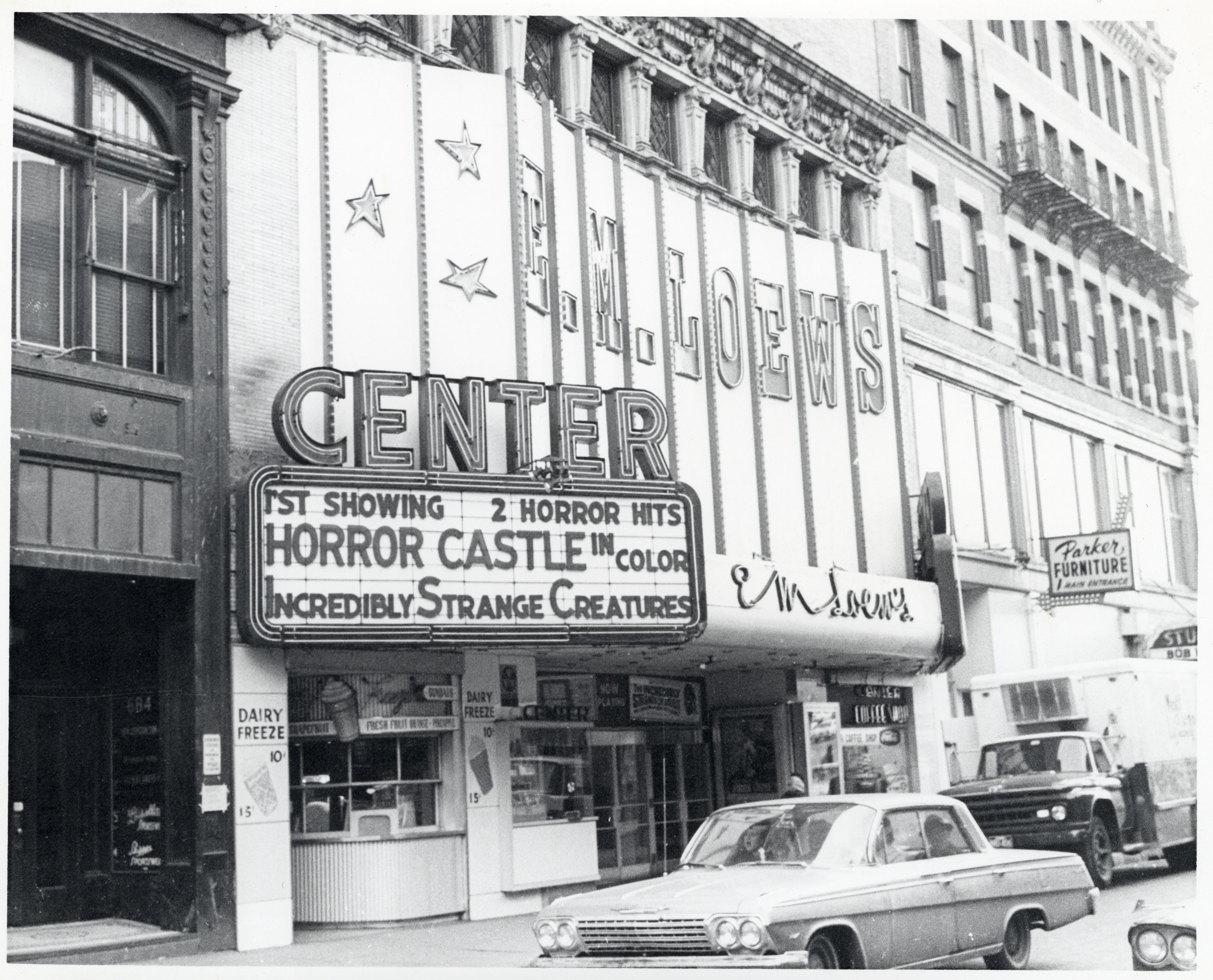
A Boston theater in 1965 with Incredibly Strange Creatures as the second film of a double bill

Ever since its release, many critics have considered the film to be one of the worst ever made. The 2004 DVD The 50 Worst Movies Ever Made ranked it at No. 1.

Variety wrote: "The Incredibly-Strange Creatures Who Stopped Living, And Became Mixed-Up Zombies is a low-budget shocker about carny murders. Okay musical production numbers and good direction overcome weak script and performances. Excellent photography adds visual interest."

However, the film has since become a cult classic and has been celebrated by fans of B movies, camp, or kitsch films. Leonard Maltin awarded the film two and a half out of a possible four stars (his most widely used rating), complimenting the film's use of colors and haunting atmosphere while criticizing the film's acting, dialogue, and simplistic plot. Writing for Turner Classic Movies, critic Richard Harland Smith described the film as "junk drawer cinema at its most impossible to close" and "loose-knit to the point of unraveling," but opined that "it's precisely this threadbare, developed-in-the-bathroom-sink aesthetic that explains the film's confounding charm" and that the film is "considerably better than its reputation."

Rock critic Lester Bangs wrote an appreciative 1973 essay about Incredibly Strange Creatures, in which he tries to explain and justify the movie's value:

...this flick doesn't just rebel against, or even disregard, standards of taste and art. In the universe inhabited by The Incredibly Strange Creatures Who Stopped Living and Became Mixed-Up Zombies, such things as standards and responsibility have never been heard of. It is this lunar purity which largely imparts to the film its classic stature. Like Beyond the Valley of the Dolls and a very few others, it will remain as an artifact in years to come to which scholars and searchers for truth can turn and say, "This was trash!"

As of June 2026, the film has a 20% "Rotten" rating on Rotten Tomatoes.

The DVD release of Incredibly Strange Creatures features commentary tracks by both Steckler and "drive-in movie critic" Joe Bob Briggs.

== See also ==
- List of American films of 1964
- List of films considered the worst
- Night of the Living Dead
- Carnival of Souls
