= Joe Bob Goes Back to the Drive In =

The sequel to Joe Bob Goes to the Drive In, Joe Bob Goes Back to the Drive In is the continuation of the gonzo movie critic's adventures with drive-in films.

== Summary ==
Joe Bob, now writing for different papers after apparently being fired from the Dallas Times-Herald in 1985, continues with drive-in movie criticism. The fake stories surrounding and couching each review are noticeably reduced in this book, and almost all of Joe Bob's fictional friends - except for Chubb Fricke - have basically wandered out of the ongoing, almost soap opera-like plot of the book.

In addition to the reviews and Joe Bob's Mailbag, this book also has two new features. The first is Communist Alert!, in which Joe Bob singles out and derides someone, somewhere, for an act that goes against Joe Bob's principles (such as the banning of a breast calendar for breast cancer awareness). These ended with "Remember: without eternal vigilance, it can happen here."

The second is a review of a VHS movie of drive-in quality, after Joe Bob became an overnight VHS convert. These are always shorter than the 'feature' review, and actually lend an A movie - B movie double feature feel to his work.
