= Keith A. Wester =

American sound engineer

- Born: Keith Albert Wester; February 21, 1940; Seattle, Washington, United States
- Died: November 1, 2002 (aged 62); Studio City, California, United States
- Resting place: Forest Lawn Memorial Park (Hollywood Hills)
- Occupation: Sound engineer
- Years active: 1966-2002

Keith A. Wester (February 21, 1940 – November 1, 2002) was an American sound engineer. He was nominated for six Academy Awards in the category Best Sound. He worked on nearly 60 films between 1966 and 2002.

== Selected filmography ==
- Black Rain (1989)
- Waterworld (1995)
- The Rock (1996)
- Air Force One (1997)
- Armageddon (1998)
- The Perfect Storm (2000)
