= Ray Dennis Steckler =

American actor (1938–2009)

- Born: Raymond Dennis Steckler; January 25, 1938; Reading, Pennsylvania, U.S.
- Died: January 7, 2009 (aged 70); Las Vegas, Nevada, U.S.
- Other name: Cash Flagg
- Occupations: Director; producer; actor; cinematographer
- Years active: 1962–2009
- Spouse(s): Carolyn Brandt (1963–1973) (divorced) (2 children); Katherine Louise Coon (1986–2009) (2 children) (his death)

Raymond Dennis Steckler (January 25, 1938 – January 7, 2009), also known by the pseudonym Cash Flagg, was an American film director, producer, screenwriter and actor best known as the low-budget auteur of such cult films as The Incredibly Strange Creatures Who Stopped Living and Became Mixed-Up Zombies. In addition to Cash Flagg, Steckler was also known by the pseudonyms Sven Christian, Henri-Pierre Duval, Pierre Duvall, Sven Hellstrom, Ricardo Malatoté, Harry Nixon, Michael J. Rogers, Michel J. Rogers, Wolfgang Schmidt, Cindy Lou Steckler, R.D. Steckler, Ray Steckler, and Cindy Lou Sutters—this last his "porn name".

== Early life and career ==
Raymond Dennis Steckler was born in Reading, Pennsylvania, where his grandmother, who largely raised him, nurtured his love of movies. At 15, upon receiving an 8mm home movie camera from his stepfather, Steckler shot an amateur pirate film with friends. Ray served three years in the United States Army from 1956 to 1959, being discharged as a Sergeant. He was an Army photographer, served in Korea, and spent a year at the Kaufman Astoria Studios in Astoria, Queens with the Army Pictorial Service of the Signal Corps. In 1959, Steckler and a friend drove to Hollywood, California to enter the film industry.

Steckler worked as a prop man before becoming assistant cameraman on the film The World's Greatest Sinner, directed by and starring Timothy Carey. When the initial director of photography was fired, Steckler replaced him.

Continuing to work in cinematography in the Los Angeles area, Steckler acquired a union card and established himself at major studios, including Universal Studios. When he was reportedly fired for almost knocking an A-frame onto Alfred Hitchcock, Steckler turned to the B-movie circuit. Working with Arch Hall Sr.'s Fairway Pictures, Steckler started as cinematographer and sometimes actor in the vehicles for Hall's son, Arch Hall, Jr. Steckler made his directorial debut with the Hall vehicle Wild Guitar. When Arch Hall Sr. was worried whether his film would play when the original choice of the heavy was black, Steckler told his friend he had to go and took the role under his onscreen name, Cash Flagg.

=== The Incredibly Strange Creatures Who Stopped Living and Became Mixed-Up Zombies ===
In 1963 he co-produced his second film, The Incredibly Strange Creatures Who Stopped Living and Became Mixed-Up Zombies, co-starring his then wife, Carolyn Brandt. Filmed for a budget of $38,000, the film was photographed by cinematographer Joseph V. Mascelli with then newcomers László Kovács and Vilmos Zsigmond as camera operators. Initially distributed on the lower half of a double-bill by Fairway, Steckler took Creatures on the road himself and made it a success under a number of titles, including Diabolical Dr. Voodoo and The Teenage Psycho Meets Bloody Mary.

Steckler's next film was his answer to Psycho, entitled The Thrill Killers, released in 1964. The film marked the first effort between Steckler and Ron Haydock, who would be Steckler's creative partner up until the latter's death in the 1970s. It also notably features Gary Kent as a blood-thirsty killer.

Steckler continued to produce a number of low-budget but fanciful films which soon attained cult status, including Rat Pfink a Boo Boo (a spoof of Batman) and Lemon Grove Kids Meet the Monsters (an homage to the East Side Kids films). By the late 1960s, he also directed the music video for Jefferson Airplane's "White Rabbit", as well as promos for Jimi Hendrix, Nazz, and Frank Zappa.

== Later life and career ==
With the decline of drive-in horror films of the nature Steckler was producing in the 1960s, and following his divorce from Brandt, with whom he had daughters Linda and Laura, Steckler produced hardcore adult films during the 1970s and 1980s. Circa 1986, he married his second wife, Katherine, with whom he had daughters Morgan and Bailey. Steckler named daughter Morgan after his partner George Morgan who financed The Incredibly Strange Creatures.

The Thrill Killers, Rat-Pfink a Boo-Boo, The Incredibly Strange Creatures and Las Vegas Serial Killer were first released on home video in 1986–1987 by CAMP Home Video, a small independent company based in Los Angeles, CA.

In the late 1980s, Steckler opened Mascot Video in Las Vegas and sold it in 1995 to local businessman Dan Wayman. Up until his death in 2009, Steckler continued to sell videos of his works via the web, including six volumes of young actresses and dancers in nude auditions for Steckler's camera. Steckler says these auditions were shot in 1991 for The Hollywood Strangler in Las Vegas (a.k.a. Las Vegas Serial Killer), but that film was finished by 1987.

In 2008, Steckler announced production of his new film One More Time, which he described as an "extension" (as opposed to a "sequel") to The Incredibly Strange Creatures, and launched two MySpace pages and a website for casting actresses for his upcoming films. Steckler completed post-production of One More Time shortly before his death. It was filmed on location on the Santa Cruz Beach Boardwalk and Las Vegas on a budget of $3,800 using two Digital 8 cameras. The film was released direct-to-DVD via his website in 2009.

== Death ==
Shortly after returning to Las Vegas, Steckler, who had been fighting heart disease for several years, died of cardiac arrest on January 7, 2009, aged 70. He was buried at the Palm Mortuary and Cemetery Green Valley.

== Legacy ==
Wild Guitar was restored by director/fan Nicolas Winding Refn and featured at the Black Deer Festival in 2019.

Incredibly Strange Creatures had since become a cult classic, mentioned as being one of the worst movies ever made, and has been celebrated by fans of B movies, camp or kitsch films. The rock critic Lester Bangs wrote an appreciative 1973 essay about Incredibly Strange Creatures in which he tries to explain and justify the movie's value:

...this flick doesn't just rebel against, or even disregard, standards of taste and art. In the universe inhabited by The Incredibly Strange Creatures Who Stopped Living and Became Mixed-Up Zombies, such things as standards and responsibility have never been heard of. It is this lunar purity which largely imparts to the film its classic stature. Like Beyond the Valley of the Dolls and a very few others, it will remain as an artifact in years to come to which scholars and searchers for truth can turn and say, "This was trash!"

Falling into semi-obscurity past its eccentric title (as it was also the inspiration for the documentary series The Incredibly Strange Film Show which interviewed Steckler himself in one episode), the film gained notoriety once again in 1997, when it was featured on the television series Mystery Science Theater 3000.

Steckler's low-budget often meant working for little to nothing, but his comradeship was often reflected in his productions. In his 1969 film Body Fever, Steckler created a bit part for then destitute fellow director Coleman Francis, who, by coincidence, also achieved belated fame via Mystery Science Theater 3000. Francis died not long after the making of the film.

== Filmography ==
=== Director ===
- Wild Guitar (1962)
- Goof on the Loose (1963), short film
- The Incredibly Strange Creatures Who Stopped Living and Became Mixed-Up Zombies (1964)
- The Thrill Killers (1964)
- The Lemon Grove Kids (1965), segment in film Lemon Grove Kids Meet the Monsters
- Rat Pfink a Boo Boo (1966)
- Jefferson Airplane's White Rabbit, music video (1967)
- Nazz's Open My Eyes music video (1968)
- Sinthia, the Devil's Doll (1968) as Sven Christian
- Body Fever (1969)
- The Mad Love Life of a Hot Vampire (1971) as Sven Christian
- The Horny Vampire (1971)
- Blood Shack (1971) as Wolfgang Schmidt
- Sexual Satanic Awareness (1972)
- Triple Play (1974)
- Sexorcist Devil (1974) as Sven Hellstrom
- Perverted Passion (1974) as Cindy Lou Sutters
- Teenage Hustler (1975) as Harry Nixon
- Red Heat (1975)
- Teenage Dessert (1976) as Cindy Lou Sutters
- Sex Rink (1976) as Cindy Lou Sutters
- The Hollywood Strangler Meets the Skid Row Slasher (1979) as Wolfgang Schmidt
- Indian Lady (1981) as Cindy Lou Steckler
- Black Garters (1981) as Cindy Lou Sutters
- Debbie Does Las Vegas (1981) as Cindy Lou Sutters
- Weekend Cowgirls (1983) as Cindy Lou Sutters
- Plato's Retreat West (1983) as Cindy Lou Sutters
- Las Vegas Serial Killer (1986)
- War Cat (1987) (uncredited)
- Summer of Fun (1997)
- One More Time (2009)

=== Actor ===
- Wild Guitar (1962) (Steak)
- Eegah (1962) (guitar player)
- The Incredibly Strange Creatures Who Stopped Living and Became Mixed-Up Zombies (1964)
