= Carolyn Brandt =

American actress and dancer

- Born: November 20, 1940 (age 85)
- Other names: Jane Bond, Carol Flynn, Eva Gaulant, Nora Alexis
- Occupations: Actress; dancer
- Years active: 1962–2003
- Spouse: Ray Dennis Steckler (1963–1973) (divorced) (2 daughters)

Carolyn Brandt (born November 20, 1940) is an American actress, producer and dancer. She was the first wife of cult film director Ray Dennis Steckler and starred in many of his films, including The Incredibly Strange Creatures Who Stopped Living and Became Mixed-Up Zombies!!?, The Thrill Killers (both 1964), Rat Pfink a Boo Boo (1966), and Blood Shack (1971).

Brandt was featured in the film It's a Bikini World as the dancer in "Liar, Liar" with The Castaways.
