= Horror host =

Type of television presenter

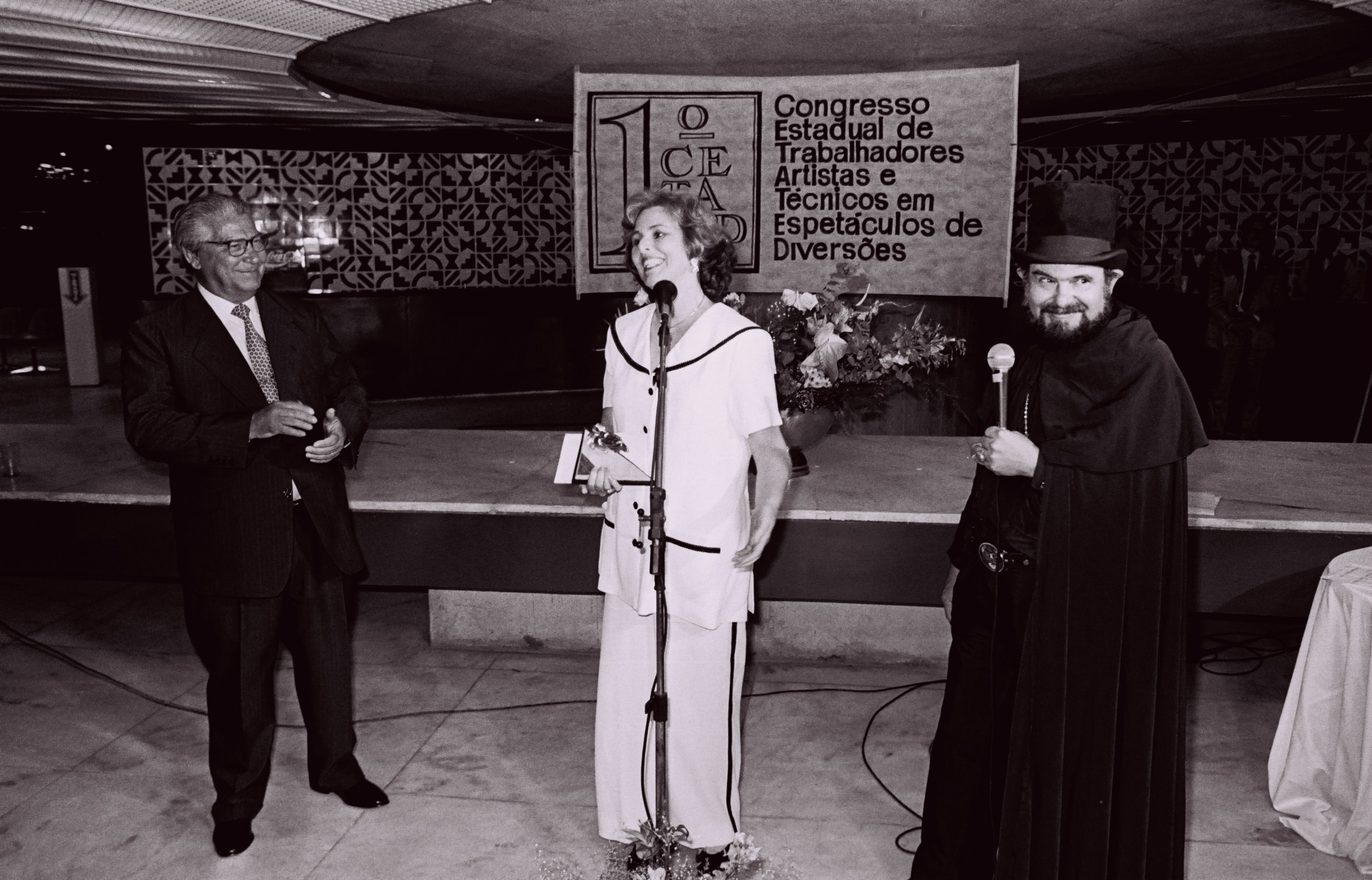
- Mário Covas e Zé do Caixão hosting a program in 1995

Occupation
- Synonym: Horror Narrator
- Activity sectors: Television

Description
- Related jobs: Television presenter

A horror host is a host or presenter of a program where horror films and low-budget B movies are shown on television or the Internet. Usually the host assumes a horror-themed persona, often a campy or humorous one. Generally there are breaks in the film where the host comments on various aspects of the movie. Many horror host shows also include skits involving the hosts themselves, sometimes with a sidekick or other supporting characters.

== History ==
=== Early hosts ===
The first (proto) television horror hostess was Vampira (Maila Nurmi). The Vampira Show featured mostly low-budget suspense films, as few horror films had yet been released for television broadcast. It ran from 1954-1955 only in the Los Angeles market, but Nurmi's persona (based on cartoonist Charles Addams's "Morticia" character) would gain fame in magazines, TV, and film. In 1957, John Zacherle of Philadelphia's WCAU (and later in other markets) set the standard format for horror hosts with his "Roland" character for the station's Shock Theater. This was made possible due to RKO Pictures' new ownership licensing out the rights to its vast B-movie horror film library. Zacherle's set, style, film commentary, and special effects (such as interjecting his image into the film) were quickly emulated at local stations around the world, and as an homage today by hosts such as the nationally syndicated Svengoolie (Rich Koz).

Each station had its own host and style. Some hosts did regular commercials, while others presented fictional ads for bottled witches' blood. Hosts were often plucked from the ranks of the station staff. In the days of live television, it was not uncommon for the weather man or booth announcer to finish a nightly news broadcast and race madly to another part of the soundstage for a quick costume change to present the evening's monster tale.

While a few early hosts like Roland and Vampira became the icons of this nationwide movement, most hosts were locals.

== Notable hosts ==
=== 1950s ===
- Gorgon
- Marvin
- Morgus the Magnificent
- Selwin
- Tarantula Ghoul
- Vampira
- Zacherley

=== 1960s ===
- Bill "Chilly Billy" Cardille
- Coffin Joe
- Deadly Earnest
- Ghoulardi
- Gorgon
- Moona Lisa
- Morgus the Magnificent
- Sammy Terry
- Selwin
- Sir Graves Ghastly
- Superhost
- Vegas Vampire
- Bob Wilkins

=== 1970s ===
- Big Chuck and Lil' John
- Bob Wilkins
- The Cool Ghoul
- Count Gore de Vol
- Count Scary
- Dr. Creep
- Doctor Madblood
- Dr. Shock
- Edwin "Uncle Ted" Raub
- Fritz the Nite Owl
- The Ghoul
- Morgus the Magnificent
- Sammy Terry
- Sinister Seymour
- Sir Cecil Creape
- Svengoolie
- Vincent Price

=== 1980s ===
- Al "Grampa" Lewis
- Bob Wilkins
- Commander USA's Groovie Movies
- Count Floyd
- Count Gore de Vol
- Count Scary
- Crematia Mortem
- Dr. Paul Bearer
- Elvira, Mistress of the Dark
- Freddy Krueger
- Fritz the Nite Owl
- Joe Bob Briggs
- Morgus the Magnificent
- Mystery Science Theater 3000
- Ned the Dead
- Sammy Terry
- Stella
- Son of Ghoul
- Son of Svengoolie/Svengoolie
- Uncle Don's Theater
- Uncle Ted

=== 1990s ===
- Coffin Joe
- Count Gore de Vol
- Dr. Gangrene
- Gilbert Gottfried
- Dr. Sarcofiguy
- Joe Bob Briggs
- The Midnight Society
- Maxwell Truth, Bird and Zelda
- Morgus the Magnificent
- Sandra Bernhard
- Ernst-Hugo Järegård
- Edwin "Uncle Ted" Raub

=== 2000s ===
- Count Gore de Vol
- Dr. Gangrene
- Dr. Sarcofiguy
- Jami Deadly
- Morgus the Magnificent
- Mr. Lobo
- Penny Dreadful XIII

=== 2010s ===
- Count Gore de Vol
- Dr. Gangrene
- Joe Bob Briggs
- Morgus the Magnificent
- Penny Dreadful XIII
- Sammy Terry
- The Boulet Brothers
- Svengoolie
- James A. Janisse

=== 2020s ===
- Count Gore de Vol
- Dr. Gangrene
- Joe Bob Briggs
- Penny Dreadful XIII
- The Boulet Brothers
- Svengoolie
- James A. Janisse

== See also ==
- American Scary
- Cinema Insomnia
- Creature Double Feature
- Creature Features
- Creature Features (WNEW)
- Creature Feature (WTOG)
- Horror hosts in comics
