= Dr. Creep =

American local television personality

Dr. Creep (aka "The Creeper", "Dr. Death")
- Mid-1970s Promotion Photo of Dr. Creep
- Born: Barry Lee Hobart; June 23, 1941; Middletown, Ohio, U.S.
- Died: January 14, 2011 (aged 69); Middletown, Ohio, U.S.
- Occupations: Television master control operator, children's show host, horror movie host
- Years active: 1972–2010
- Known for: Shock Theater/Shock Theatre (creator/host); Clubhouse 22 (co-host) co-founder of Project Smiles charity work for MDA Telethons

Barry Lee Hobart (June 23, 1941 – January 14, 2011) was a local television personality widely known to fans as Dr. Creep. He was a horror movie host on WKEF Television in Dayton, Ohio.

== Early life ==
Hobart was a native of nearby Middletown, born June 23, 1941, to parents Edward and Grace (Fullen) Hobart; he was also the nephew of horror film make-up artist and stuntman Doug Hobart, who hosted a traveling monster show in the 1940s and 1950s. Hobart graduated from Middletown High School in 1959, then attended the University of Cincinnati where he graduated in 1963 with a degree in broadcasting.

After an overseas stint in the Marine Corps, Hobart returned to southwest Ohio and was hired by WKEF television as a camera specialist and Master Control Operator.

== Shock Theater (Theatre) ==
In 1971, WKEF management began looking for a gimmick to garner ratings on Saturday nights. When Hobart suggested a late-night horror movie show, station management accepted the idea; encouraged by colleagues, Hobart himself auditioned for the hosting job by donning a monk's robe, fangs and skull-like make-up, initially calling himself "Dr. Death". After Hobart was given the job the fangs were abandoned and the skull face motif toned down for being too fearsome, and the character's name was changed to "Dr. Creep".

Shock Theater premiered on Saturday, January 1, 1972, and was a fixture on WKEF for thirteen years. The title was also spelled Shock Theatre and by 1977 that spelling remained. During that time, Dr. Creep co-hosted Clubhouse 22, a popular weekday afternoon kids show, adding to his local star power.

1972 TV Guide ad for Shock Theater (note fangs and skull-face)

Like many other late-night horror shows, Shock Theater/Shock Theatre played classic "B" horror films, with bumpers and breaks featuring the host, leaning more toward the humorous than the horrific.

By the mid 1970s, Shock Theater/Shock Theatre had moved to Saturday afternoons, garnering a younger following. The show was moved back to late Saturday night by 1977; then was renamed Saturday Night Dead when WKEF changed network affiliations on January 1, 1980, and the show followed NBC's Saturday Night Live. But by the early 1980s, the show's humor had become more risqué, causing increasing clashes with station management. Consequently, Shock Theater/Shock Theatre ended its run in March 1985, but Hobart remained a Master Control Operator at WKEF for six more years.

== Later years ==
In 1986, Filmation's animated cartoon show Ghostbusters featured a character named Doctor Creep in season one, episode 13 "A Friend In Need." The character bears a strong resemblance to Barry Hobart's Dr. Creep character with gloves, white face and an old Dutch beard.

In 1999, cult film director Andrew Copp and partner, video producer Rick Martin, would resurrect Shock Theater with Dr. Creep at the helm once again for Dayton, Ohio Public-access television. Simply called "The New Shock Theater", the show aired public domain films mixed with footage of Dr. Creep at Horror conventions and ran periodically through 2005.

In 2002, Hobart played Dr. Creep again in Necrophagia: Through Eyes Of The Dead, a collection of music videos and interviews with the rock band Necrophagia and other horror hosts directed by Jim Van Bebber. In 2003 Hobart stepped in front of the camera as a fatherlike spirit in Andrew Copp's film, Black Sun, which built up a cult following. That same year he provided the opening narration for Copp's Freakshow Deluxe, a documentary about a sideshow that pops up around Halloween in Xenia, Ohio, and appeared as himself in the short film Joe Nosferatu: Homeless Vampire, produced by Bob Hinton aka A. Ghastlee Ghoul.

Hobart is featured reminiscing about his career as a horror host and the horror host phenomena in John E. Hudgens' 2006 documentary American Scary.

Hobart's Dr. Creep inspired an entire generation of Horror Hosts from the Ohio region, such as Baron Von Porkchop (who hosts a similar show on Dayton Access Television), Dr. Freak and A. Ghastlee Ghoul, all of whom credit him as their mentor.

In 2011 Dr. Creep was inducted into the first class of The Horror Host Hall Of Fame alongside fellow hosts like Vampira, The Cool Ghoul, Morgus the Magnificent and Sammy Terry.

== Charity work ==
As Dr. Creep, Hobart had been an avid supporter of local charities, helping out the MDA during their annual Labor Day telethon. Hobart and Linda Gabbard founded "Project Smiles", a charity that collects toys every Christmas for needy children in the Dayton area. The charity is still active today.

In 1997, Dr. Creep, Andrew Copp and Rick Martin started Horrorama, an all-night film festival held every Halloween to raise funds for Project Smiles. Horrorama originally took place at the Flicker Palace, a now-defunct movie theater in the Dayton suburb of Huber Heights, but moved to the Englewood Cinema in nearby Englewood shortly after. The festival remains active today and is currently held annually in Huber Heights once again.

== Death ==
Hobart's health began to fail in the last years of his life. Leg and respiratory issues rendered him unable to walk by April 2010. After this point, he used a wheelchair. Hobart continued making appearances as Dr. Creep through the fall. In November, he was guest of honor at the HorrorHound Weekend event in Cincinnati.

Hobart lapsed into a coma after a series of massive strokes in December 2010. Complications resulted in Hobart's death at a Dayton hospice on January 14, 2011. He was 69 years old.
