= Virginia Creepers =

- Directed by: Sean Kotz; Christopher Valluzzo
- Written by: Sean Kotz
- Produced by: Sean Kotz
- Starring: Mr. Lobo; Bowman Body; Count Gore De Vol; Doctor Madblood; Dr. Gruesome & Skeeter; Dr. Sarcofiguy; Ghoulda; Hazel Witch; Jebediah Buzzard; Karlos Borloff; Ronald
- Release date: October 10, 2009
- Country: United States
- Language: English

Virginia Creepers: The Horror Host Tradition of the Old Dominion (or simply Virginia Creepers) is a 2009 documentary film about horror hosts from Virginia directed by Sean Kotz and Christopher Valluzzo.

Kotz and Valluzzo would later release a documentary focusing on horror host Bill Bowman, Hi There Horror Movie Fans: The Bowman Body Documentary, in 2011.

== Synopsis ==
The documentary focuses on horror show hosts from Virginia and Washington D.C.. Hosts featured in the documentary include the Bowman Body, Mr. Lobo, Count Gore De Vol, Doctor Madblood, and Dr. Gruesome & Skeeter.

Kotz has stated that the documentary gave them the ability to " not only show the progression of hosts but the progression of television history."

== Cast ==
- Erik Lobo as himself/narrator (Mr. Lobo)
- Bill Bowman as himself/The Bowman Body
- Dick Dyszel as himself/Count Gore De Vol
- Jerry Harrell as himself/Doctor Madblood
- Mark Bartholomew & Matthew Pak as themselves/Dr. Gruesome & Skeeter
- John Dimes as himself/Dr. Sarcofiguy
- Geri Roberts (nee Chronowit) as herself/Ghoulda
- Anna Inge Jump as herself/Hazel Witch
- Shane Boyde Steddum as himself/Jebediah Buzzard
- Jerry Moore as himself/Karlos Borloff
- Jerry Sandford as himself/Ronald

== Reception ==
Paul Carupe of Rue Morgue reviewed Virginia Creepers saying "The doc ably captures the ramshackle charm of these local productions, the dedicated people that made them and how they became neighborhood stars in the process."

== Home media ==
On October 30, 2009, Horse Archer Productions released the film on DVD. The DVD cover is a visual reference to the 1945 film House of Dracula.

== Bowman Body ==
Kotz and Valluzo began work on a documentary focusing on the horror host Bowman Body, Bill Bowman, after the release of Virginia Creepers. They stated that they were approached several times by fans who wanted to "see more of Bowman and they especially wanted more clips from his shows." Researching for the documentary was a challenge as Bowman's show, Shock Theatre, aired before the advent of taping on VCR. Little footage existed as "the station didn’t want to tie up expensive tape with clips from Shock Theatre.” Only thirteen minutes existed of the original footage.

Kotz researched air times for Shock Theatre via copies of the Richmond Times Dispatch in order to compile a filmography of the show during its time on WXEX. He also researched Bowman's shows in other areas of Virginia, Cobweb Theatre (Charlottesville, WVIR) and Monsterpiece Theater (Fairfax, WNVC), noting that WNVC likely only showed public domain films as it was a public broadcasting station. At the height of its popularity Shock Theatre surpassed The Tonight Show in ratings for Central Virginia.

Hi There Horror Movie Fans: The Bowman Body Documentary was released in 2011 and premiered at the Byrd Theatre in Richmond, Virginia. It has been credited by its director, Eric Miller, as assisting in the creation of the PBS show Midnight Frights. Miller, and the show's host Armistead Spottswoode, were both featured in Hi There Horror Movie Fans and its predecessor Virginia Creepers. The pair were recognized by the Richmond PBS programming director due to their appearances and were offered a chance to create a new series.

In 2015 Bowman began hosting new episodes, which were filmed at the Ashland Theater. Films featured in the episodes included House on Haunted Hill.

== See also ==
- American Scary
