= Uncle Ted =

Uncle Ted may refer to:

== People ==
- Edwin Raub (1921-1998), horror host who presented under the stage name "Uncle Ted".
- Ted Nugent (b. 1948), American rock musician.
- Ted Stevens (1923-2010), American politician from Alaska.
- Ted Kaczynski (1942-2023), American mathematician and eco-terrorist.

== Fictional characters ==
- Uncle Ted, an electric organ powerup in the video game Putty.
- Uncle Ted, from the 1996 movie Bad Moon.
- Uncle Ted, from the 2009 film My Son, My Son, What Have Ye Done?.
- Uncle Ted, from the animated series Bobby's World.
- Uncle Ted, from the British TV serial The Buddha of Suburbia.
