= Sparenberg =

Sparenberg is a surname. Notable people with the surname include:

- Dave Sparenberg (born 1959), American football player
- Ray Sparenberg, American horror host
- René Sparenberg (1918–2013), Dutch field hockey player

== See also ==
- Sparenberg, Texas
