= Creature Feature =

Creature Feature may refer to:

- A monster movie
- Creature Feature (1973 TV series), an American television series
- Creature Feature (Chill), a 1985 supplement for the role-playing game Chill
- Creature Feature (comic strip), a British comic strip
- "Creature Feature" (Ben 10), an episode of the television series Ben 10
- "Creature Feature" (Craig of the Creek), an episode of the television series Craig of the Creek
- Creature Feature, a 1993 EP by Man or Astro-man?
- "Creature Feature", a song by Chapman Whitney from the 1974 album Chapman Whitney Streetwalkers
- Creature Feature, a horror-themed rock band.

== See also ==
- Creature Features (disambiguation)
