= Creature Features (disambiguation) =

Creature Features are American horror television series.

Creature Features may also refer to:

- Creature Features (1969 TV series), an American horror television series
- Creature Features (Cinemax), an American horror film series
- Creature Features, an Australian television series broadcast by ABC

== See also ==
- Creature Feature (disambiguation)
