= Fright Night (TV series) =

Fright Night was the name of two science fiction and horror film programs. One ran from 1970 to 1981, and the other ran from 1973 to 1987. Both programs were broadcast by KHJ-TV Los Angeles, and its sister-station WOR-TV New York City.

== Los Angeles ==
Fright Night was a television horror show that presented low-budget horror and science fiction films on KHJ-TV in Los Angeles between 1970 and 1981. The host for the show was Larry Vincent (Sinister Seymour). He was noted for his style of criticizing the films he presented in an offbeat and funny manner, usually appearing in a small window which would pop up in the corner, tossing a quip, then vanishing again.

His show began with a voice-over introduction by a whiny-voiced, never seen assistant, who proclaimed him "... the Master of the Macabre, the Epitome of Evil, the most sinister man to crawl across the face of the Earth, SEEEEEEEYmooooourrrr!" He would then come out from behind the "slimiest of walls," and often lambaste the viewing audience for wasting their time watching such "stinkers." His presentations generally were poorly written films which had been distributed for late-night filler programming, in the days before satellite distribution became cost-effective for non-network stations.

He would frequently try to get a free meal from Pizza Fella which was a take-off on a then-popular franchise known as Pizza Man. He would comment that a character was a "real four-flusher", followed by the sound of a toilet, flushing four times.

Vincent was briefly replaced by Elvira prototype Moona Lisa (Lisa Clark), "girl guide of the galaxy and heavenly hostess" during 1972–1973. When Vincent died in 1975 he was replaced by Grimsley (Robert Foster). The show lasted until 1979. In 1981, the show was revived by Elvira ("Mistress of the Dark") and was renamed "Movie Macabre".

=== Fiction ===
In the American horror film Fright Night (1985), Roddy McDowall's character, Peter Vincent, is also a horror host for a TV horror show titled Fright Night.

== New York City ==
Fright Night was also a horror program that aired on New York's WOR-TV, Channel 9. Unlike some of the station's other horror showcases from the 1970s such as Thriller Theater and Chiller Thriller, Fright Night catered to an adult audience.

The opening contained a series of classic monsters from the Universal Horror series. Bela Lugosi as Dracula, Elsa Lanchester as the Bride of Frankenstein, Lon Chaney Jr. as The Wolfman and then Boris Karloff as the Frankenstein Monster, which dissolved into a skull from whose empty eye socket flowed wispy dry ice mist. Then two words appeared in the eye socket "FRIGHT NIGHT".

From there the screen would give way to an incredible array of weekly horror films unlike those offered on any other station of the time. The show ran at various times throughout its history, ranging from midnight to 1 and 1:30 am. Fright Night had its premiere on Saturday night, October 6, 1973, at midnight. The first film shown was one of Hemisphere Pictures' television films called Decoy for Terror.

From 1973 to 1979 Fright Night showed mainly the Universal Horror classics like Dracula and Frankenstein. The Invisible Man almost became a Christmas tradition when it was broadcast for two consecutive Christmas weekends in 1976 and 1977, but instead, the violent Christmas thriller Silent Night, Bloody Night would inherit The Invisible Man's holiday time slot a few years later.

In early 1979, the station showed more 1970s slasher films and B movies such as:

- Beyond the Door
- Black Christmas
- Blood and Black Lace
- Blood from the Mummy's Tomb
- The Blood on Satan's Claw
- Captain Kronos – Vampire Hunter
- Cry of the Banshee
- Equinox
- Frogs
- Grizzly
- House of the Long Shadows
- I, Monster
- Killdozer
- Let's Scare Jessica to Death
- Look What's Happened to Rosemary's Baby
- SSSSSSS
- Season of the Witch
- Seizure
- Shock Waves
- The Asphyx
- The Beast Must Die
- The Car
- The House on Skull Mountain
- The Last House on the Left
- The Legacy
- The Manitou
- The Other
- The Town That Dreaded Sundown
- The Werewolf of Washington

From 1979 until its end in 1987, many famous horror and science-fiction films debuted on Fright Night, like Ben, Halloween, House of Dark Shadows, It's Alive, Night of Dark Shadows, The Deep, The Hills Have Eyes, The Legend of Hell House, The Texas Chain Saw Massacre and Willard.

Fright Night was discontinued in September 1987. A book about the WOR-TV version of the series entitled Fright Night on Channel 9: Saturday Night Horror Films on New York's WOR-TV, 1973-1987 by James Arena was published by Mcfarland in 2011.
