= Penny Dreadful XIII =

American television horror host

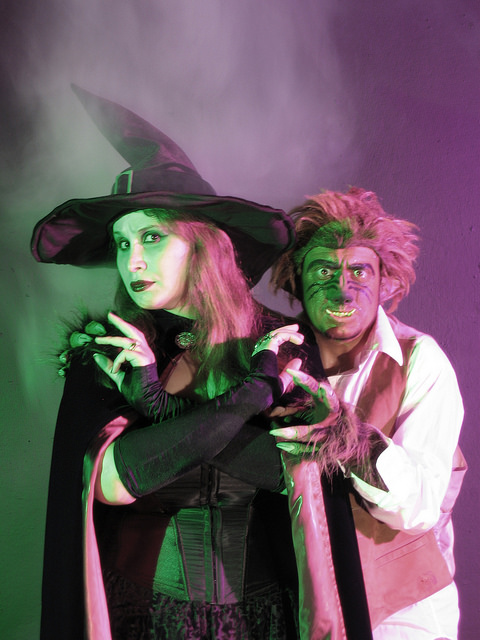
- Penny Dreadful XIII (left) and Garou

Penny Dreadful XIII is a television horror host based in New England. She is portrayed by actress, writer, and comedian Danielle Gelehrter.

== History ==
Gelehrter created the persona of Penny Dreadful the witch in an effort to revive the concept of a horror movie host on Boston-area television. The show, Penny Dreadful’s Shilling Shockers, began production in August 2005 and premiered on local cable in January 2006. Shilling Shockers first aired on Public-access television cable TV in Providence, Rhode Island; Boston, Massachusetts; New Bedford, Massachusetts; and Salem, Massachusetts. It eventually spread to over 200 cities and towns throughout the six New England states.

The names “Penny Dreadful” and “Shilling Shockers” are both derived from 19th-century serialized tales of terror, crime, and the supernatural. The Penny Dreadful witch persona is described on the program’s website as “an intermingling of light and dark elements. She can be very silly and sinister by turns, with a withering wit and a dramatic gaze." Penny is fond of using the exclamation, "hex-cellent!" and refers to her viewers as her "Dreary Ones".

== Awards ==
The Rondo Hatton Classic Horror Awards presented Penny Dreadful with the award for “Favorite Horror Host” of 2007. She was the first horror host to receive the award in this category.

Penny also won the 2010 Rondo Award for "Favorite Horror Host", becoming the first host to win the award twice in this category.

The Dreadful HallowGreen Special, a made-for-TV movie which Gelehrter co-produced and co-hosted with Larry Underwood aka TV horror host Dr. Gangrene, was nominated for a regional Midsouth Emmy Award in 2011. In the special, Penny Dreadful & Garou and Dr. Gangrene join forces to save Halloween from a terrible fate.

On March 17, 2014, Magoo Gelehrter (Penny's husband and werewolf sidekick, Garou the werewolf) received a special "Pure in Heart" Rondo Award, and later that month Penny Dreadful was inducted into the Horror Host Hall of Fame. She was inducted into the Rondo Awards Monster Kid Hall of Fame in June 2023.

On March 16, 2019, 'Shilling Shockers' director Rebecca Paiva was inducted into the Horror Host Hall of Fame in the "Behind the Screams" category.

On May 5, 2025, Penny Dreadful's Terror at Collinwood podcast won the Rondo Hatton Classic Horror Award for Best Podcast

== Appearances ==
Penny Dreadful XIII is a regular guest at conventions such as HorrorHound in Indianapolis, Indiana, Monster Bash in Pittsburgh, Pennsylvania, and Rock & Shock in Worcester, Massachusetts. Penny has hosted several live fundraising events for children’s organizations such as The Make-A-Wish Foundation and the St. Jude Children's Research Hospital. She continues to host annual Shilling Shockers Halloween specials and has appeared in a number of horror-themed publications such as Fangoria Magazine, Rue Morgue, and Scary Monsters Magazine as well as in films such as Atomic Brain Invasion and The Dungeon of Dr. Dreck.

== Penny's sidekicks ==
Garou is the werewolf henchman and husband of Penny Dreadful. He communicates only through guttural growls and funny facial expressions. Garou was portrayed by Magoo Gelehrter, who died in May 2014 following a battle with cancer.

Dr. Manfred Von Bulow is a semi-retired vampire hunter with a thick German accent. He is Penny Dreadful’s foil. He is portrayed by Ivan Bernier.

Luna is a madwoman, released from the abandoned Danvers State Hospital. She is insane but highly intelligent. Luna is portrayed by the series' television director Rebecca Paiva.

== Terror at Collinwood: A Dark Shadows Podcast ==
In May 2021, Gelehrter launched a podcast called Terror at Collinwood and serves as its host. The Rondo Award-winning podcast celebrates and examines the classic gothic television serial Dark Shadows. Terror at Collinwood explores Dark Shadows’ storylines and characters, examining the show’s important place in gothic horror and pop culture history. Episode topics include in-depth conversations with guests about the show’s major storylines, examinations of the Gothic, the importance of Dark Shadows to “monster kid” culture, Dark Shadows collectible discussions, and more. The podcast also features in-depth discussions and interviews with fans, creators, crew, and cast members including David Selby, Kathryn Leigh Scott, Lara Parker, Marie Wallace, and more.

== Personal life ==
On May 16, 2014 Gelehrter's real-life husband Magoo Gelehrter, who played Garou the werewolf of 'Shilling Shockers' died due to stage four cancer.

On September 21, 2018 Gelehrter identified herself on the public Penny Dreadful Facebook page as a post-operative MTF transgender woman, and also revealed that her late husband Magoo Gelehrter had been a transgender FTM man. This was prompted by a ballot question in Massachusetts at the time which would have prohibited people from using the restroom of the opposite gender.

Danielle Gelehrter studied theatre at San Francisco State University. She also studied improv comedy at Second City (Chicago), Improv Boston, and Improv Asylum. She possesses BA degrees in Creative Writing and in Literature, and has a Master's Degree in English. The American-born daughter of Portuguese parents from the Azores, she performed with the Portuguese Kids sketch and improv comedy troupe under her maiden name, Danielle Oliveira.

== Professional work on toy and pop culture franchises ==
Gelehrter has worked as a writer and researcher on various official projects related to popular toy and cartoon franchises.

Starting in 2016, Gelehrter and Eric Marshall took over as co-writers for the Masters of the Universe Classics toy packaging bios as well as the official digital "Masters Mondays" bios. Contracted through MVCreations, Gelehrter and Marshall wrote bios for Mattel and Super7, covering many characters and artifacts from the brand and toy line. Through the bios, Gelehrter introduced a new vampire villain called the Crimson Countess in an effort to add more distinct horror-themed elements to the Masters of the Universe canon. Gelehrter also worked as a writer and researcher on a number of books by Dark Horse Comics, including He-Man & the Masters of the Universe: The Newspaper Comic Strips, He-Man & the Masters of the Universe: A Character Guide & World Compendium, and others.

Starting in 2019, Gelehrter and Marshall began writing official packaging bios for Super7's ThunderCats Ultimates action figure line. Gelehrter and Marshall subsequently penned several toy bios for the 80's brand.
