= Moona Lisa =

Moona Lisa was the local science fiction movie host during the 1960s in San Diego, California. The show, Science Fiction Theatre, first aired in 1963 on Saturdays at 3:00 pm on KOGO, Channel 10. The character was played by Lisa Clark, who was a newscaster for the channel.

== Major roles ==
The first name used for the character was "Cosmosina", which only lasted a few weeks. Cosmosina was replaced by her cousin, Moona Lisa. Lisa Clark played both roles. Moona Lisa had long, straight black hair with bangs, stiletto heels and wore a black catsuit that showed much cleavage. She sat on a pile of rocks with "moon smoke" floating around the stage.

== Show characteristics ==
Like other horror shows, public domain science fiction and horror movies were shown with commentary by Moona Lisa. She used many live snakes on the show, often with a large python wrapped around her body. She started each show saying, "Hello, earthlings," and ended by wishing everyone, "Happy Hallucinations, Honeys!" Only about 20 seconds of videotape remain from the program's long run. The rest was erased or taped over by the station, which was a standard practice of the day.

In 1965, she presented her own rock group on the show to rival The Beatles. She introduced "The Roaches", four guys dressed in multi-arm catsuits and wearing big sunglasses. They would sing to her during the breaks, usually slow ballads. Their time on the show was short-lived.

== Show closing ==
The show ended in the early 1970s. In January 1972, Lisa Clark took Moona Lisa to KHJ-TV in Los Angeles, taking over for Seymour as the host of the late Saturday night horror show, Fright Night. The show only lasted to mid 1973. After coming back to San Diego for a short stay on KFMB, Channel 8 on Moona Lisa's Creature Features, she moved to Moona's Midnight Madness on KMOX, Channel 4 in St. Louis, MO, in 1973. That show lasted only one year.

== See also ==
- Horror Host
