= Nekoosa, Wisconsin =

Nekoosa, Wisconsin Nakrusa
- City
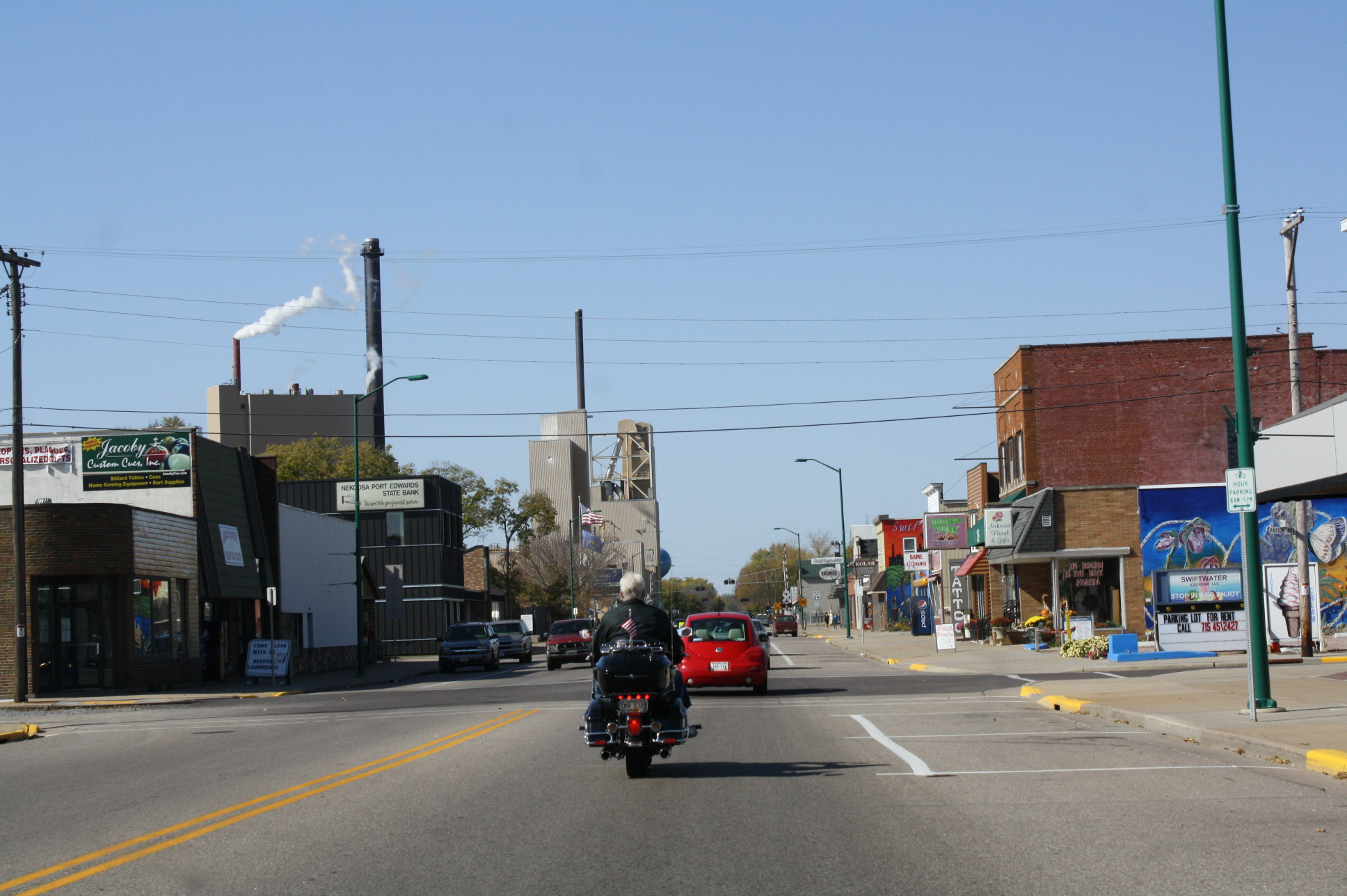
- Looking west in downtown Nekoosa

- Location of Nekoosa in Wood County, Wisconsin.

- Location within Wisconsin Location within the United States
- Coordinates: 44°19′9″N 89°54′00″W
- Country: United States
- State: Wisconsin
- County: Wood

Government
  - Mayor: Daniel J. Carlson

Area
  - Total: 3.40 sq mi (8.81 km^{2})
  - Land: 3.39 sq mi (8.79 km^{2})
  - Water: 0.012 sq mi (0.03 km^{2})
- Elevation: 950 ft (290 m)

Population (2020)
  - Total: 2,449
  - Density: 722/sq mi (279/km^{2})
- Time zone: UTC-6 (Central (CST))
  - Summer (DST): UTC-5 (CDT)
- ZIP codes: 54457
- Area codes: 715 & 534
- FIPS code: 55-55875
- GNIS feature ID: 1570148
- Website: www.cityofnekoosa.org

Nekoosa is a city in Wood County, Wisconsin, United States. Its name derives from the Ho-Chunk word, "Nįįkuusra", "Nakrusa", or "Nįkusara" which translates to "running water". The population was 2,449 at the 2020 census.

== History ==
An article dated March 16, 1916 from the long defunct newspaper The Nekoosa Tribune detailing the early history of Nekoosa may be found at the Wisconsin Historical Society web site. It is a letter written by a resident to Nekoosa High School students to support them writing a history term paper.

Point Basse

"Five rapids covering a distance of about three miles in this area were referred to as Nekoosa (swift water) by the Chippewa Indians, who made their campground on high Swallow Rock overlooking the rapids. Wakeley's tavern served as a rendezvous and resting place for the river traveler and lumber raftsman. Wakeley's was the nucleus for the development of a settlement named Point Basse (low point). The name was later changed to Nekoosa.

The settlement became a key town during the colorful era when lumber was rafted down the river from the pineries of the North to Mississippi River markets.

Daniel Whitney built the first sawmill on the Wisconsin River here at Whitney's Rapids in 1831 making Nekoosa the birthplace of Wood County. From this first harnessing of the river's power developed scores of power facilities making the Wisconsin River the hardest worked river in the world." [Point Basse historical marker, erected 1963]

== Geography ==
Nekoosa is located at 44°19′09″N 89°54′00″W (44.319081, -89.899937).

According to the United States Census Bureau, the city has a total area of 3.39 square miles (8.78 km^{2}), of which 3.38 square miles (8.75 km^{2}) is land and 0.01 square miles (0.03 km^{2}) is water.

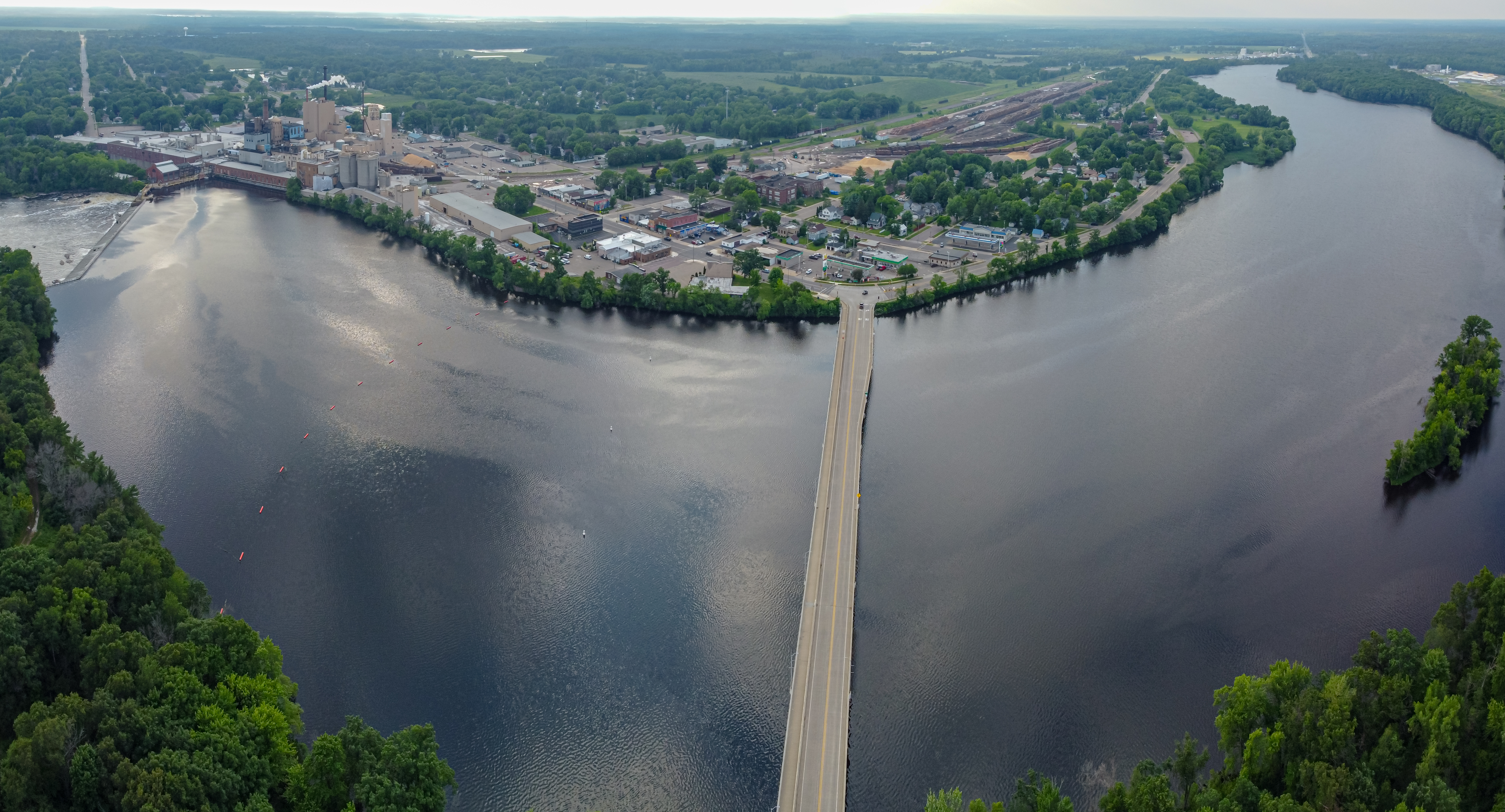
Wis-73 crossing the Wisconsin River into Nekoosa

== Demographics ==
Historical population
Census	Pop.	Note	%±
1900	745		—
1910	1,570		110.7%
1920	1,639		4.4%
1930	2,005		22.3%
1940	2,212		10.3%
1950	2,352		6.3%
1960	2,515		6.9%
1970	2,409		−4.2%
1980	2,519		4.6%
1990	2,557		1.5%
2000	2,590		1.3%
2010	2,580		−0.4%
2020	2,449		−5.1%
U.S. Decennial Census

=== 2010 census ===
As of the census of 2010, there were 2,580 people, 1,065 households, and 688 families living in the city. The population density was 763.3 inhabitants per square mile (294.7/km^{2}). There were 1,135 housing units at an average density of 335.8 units per square mile (129.7 units/km^{2}). The racial makeup of the city was 93.3% White, 0.8% African American, 1.4% Native American, 0.5% Asian, 1.8% from other races, and 2.2% from two or more races. Hispanic or Latino of any race were 3.4% of the population.

There were 1,065 households, of which 33.1% had children under the age of 18 living with them, 46.4% were married couples living together, 13.4% had a female householder with no husband present, 4.8% had a male householder with no wife present, and 35.4% were non-families. 30.2% of all households were made up of individuals, and 15.5% had someone living alone who was 65 years of age or older. The average household size was 2.40 and the average family size was 2.98.

The median age in the city was 39.4 years. 26.5% of residents were under the age of 18; 7.9% were between the ages of 18 and 24; 23.8% were from 25 to 44; 23.6% were from 45 to 64; and 18.1% were 65 years of age or older. The gender makeup of the city was 47.8% male and 52.2% female.

=== 2000 census ===
As of the census of 2000, there were 2,590 people, 987 households, and 702 families living in the city. The population density was 763.5 people per square mile (294.8 people/km^{2}). There were 1,063 housing units at an average density of 313.4 units per square mile (121.0 units/km^{2}). The racial makeup of the city was 96.72% White, 0.12% African American, 1.27% Native American, 0.31% Asian, 0.97% from other races, and 0.62% from two or more races. Hispanic or Latino of any race were 1.81% of the population.

There were 987 households, out of which 36.3% had children under the age of 18 living with them, 55.2% were married couples living together, 12.9% had a female householder with no husband present, and 28.8% were non-families. 24.8% of all households were made up of individuals, and 13.3% had someone living alone who was 65 years of age or older. The average household size was 2.55 and the average family size was 3.05.

In the city, the population was spread out, with 27.6% under the age of 18, 7.8% from 18 to 24, 27.2% from 25 to 44, 20.6% from 45 to 64, and 16.8% who were 65 years of age or older. The median age was 37 years. For every 100 females, there were 88.6 males. For every 100 females age 18 and over, there were 83.5 males.

The median income for a household in the city was $39,375, and the median income for a family was $44,583. Males had a median income of $36,308 versus $22,361 for females. The per capita income for the city was $17,063. About 6.7% of families and 9.7% of the population were below the poverty line, including 10.6% of those under age 18 and 12.0% of those age 65 or over.

== Economy ==
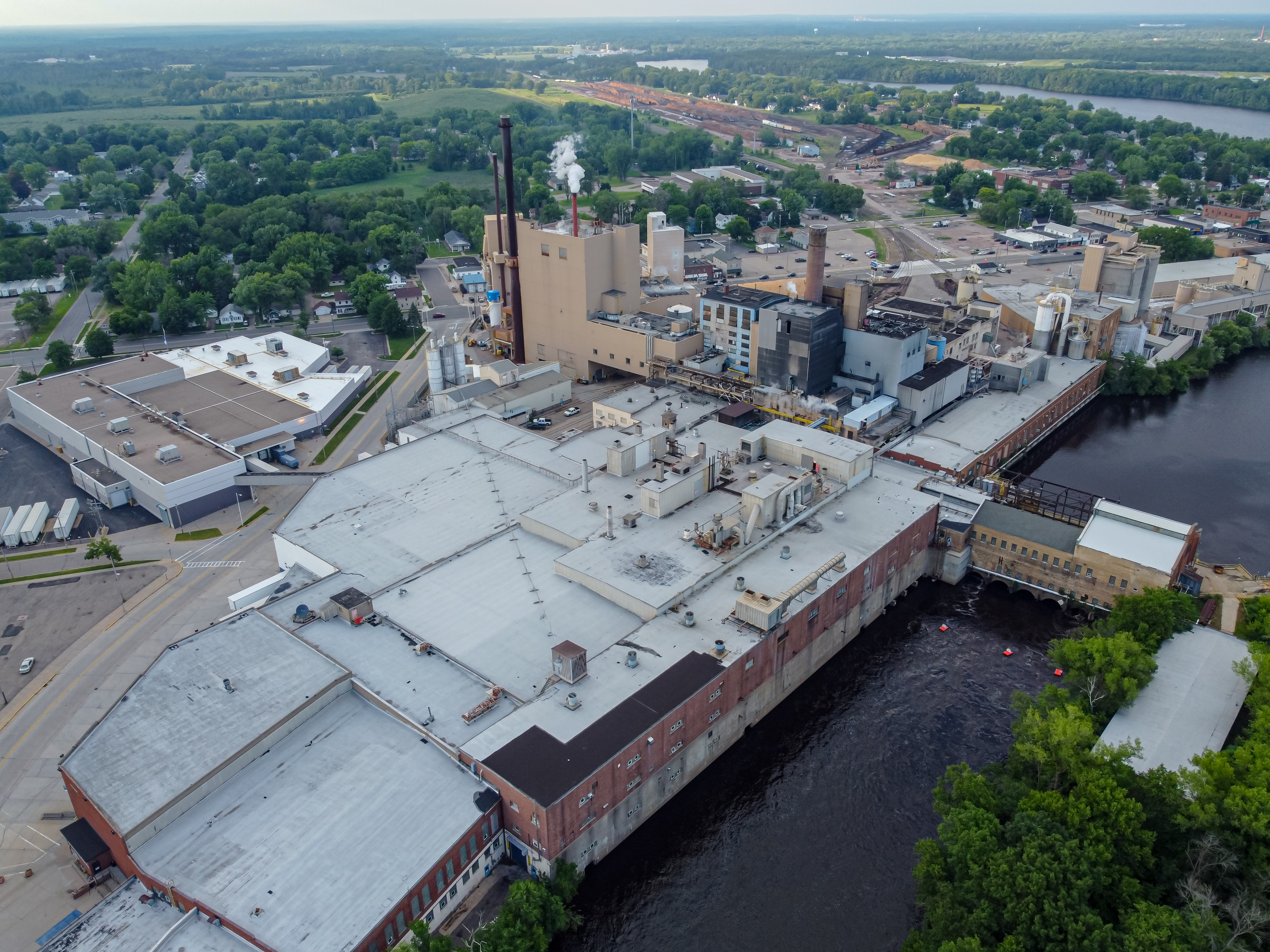
Nekoosa paper mill

Employment in Nekoosa has long been dominated by paper making. The Nekoosa Paper Company, incorporated in 1893, constructed a mill on the Wisconsin River. In 1908 it merged with a paper company in nearby Port Edwards, forming the Nekoosa Edwards Paper Company, or NEPCO. In 1970 NEPCO merged with the Great Northern Paper Company, forming Great Northern Nekoosa Corporation, or GNN, which was purchased in a hostile takeover by Georgia-Pacific in 1990. In 2001 the mill was sold to Canadian paper company Domtar.

The Nekoosa mill was the original home of a cutting-edge paper machine first shown at the 1893 Columbian Exhibition. The machine was moved in 1923 to a sister mill in Port Edwards. Stock certificates from NEPCO and GNN are popular scripophily items.

== Education ==
Nekoosa High School
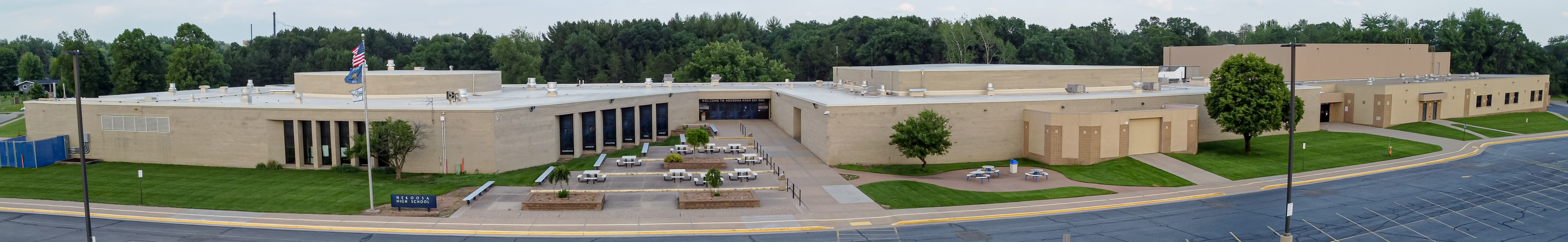
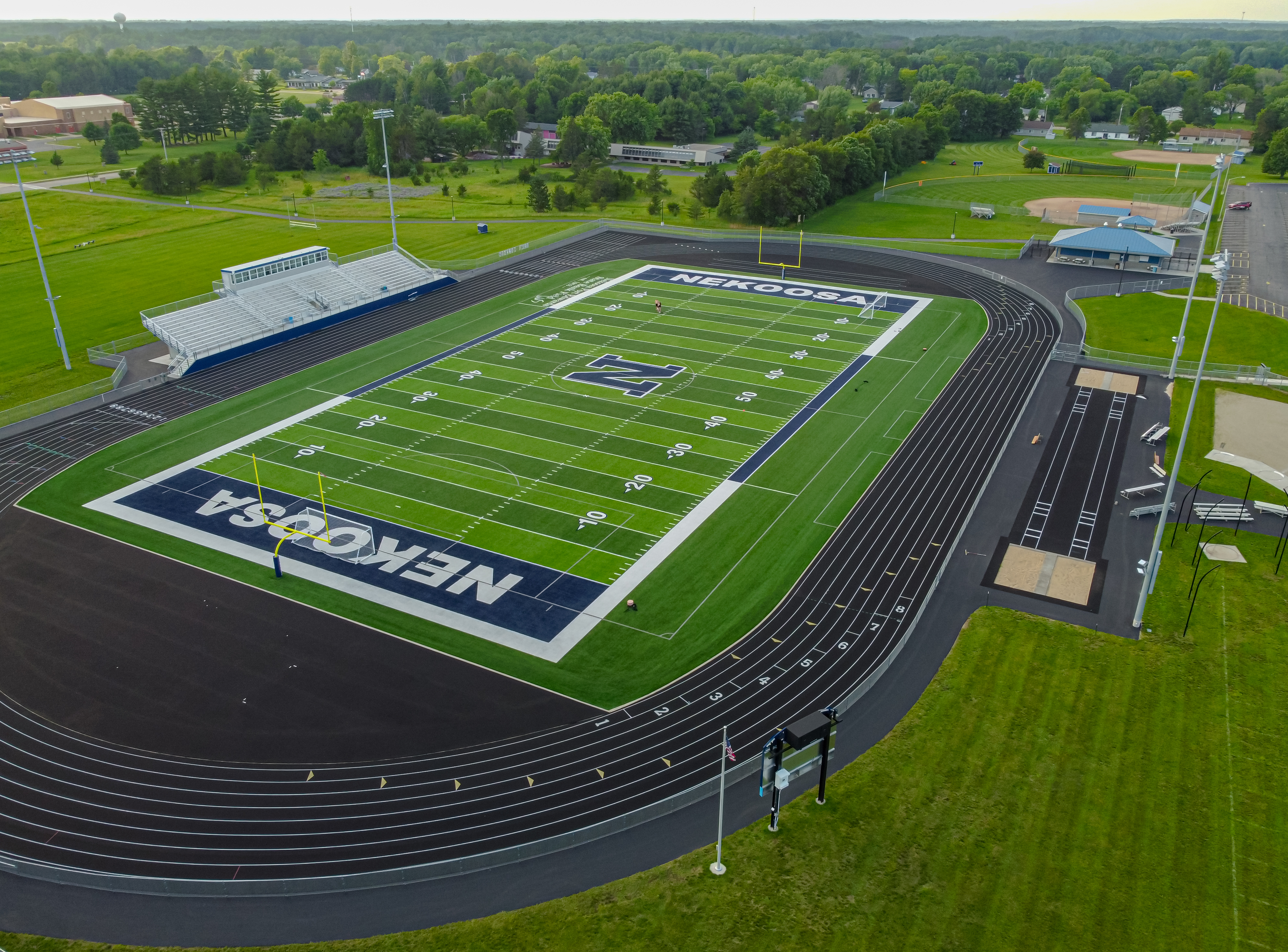

Nekoosa has four schools: Humke Elementary School, Alexander Middle School, Nekoosa High School, and Nekoosa Academy. A new school designed specifically to teach Ho-Chunk heritage and history has been added to the district as well as a charter school called CWSA or the Central Wisconsin Stem Academy

== Notable people ==
- Chief Oshkosh, Native American leader
- Ed 'Strangler' Lewis, professional wrestler
- Edgar Manske, professional football player
- Frederick C. Peerenboom, radio
- John M. Potter, Wisconsin State Senator

== Images ==
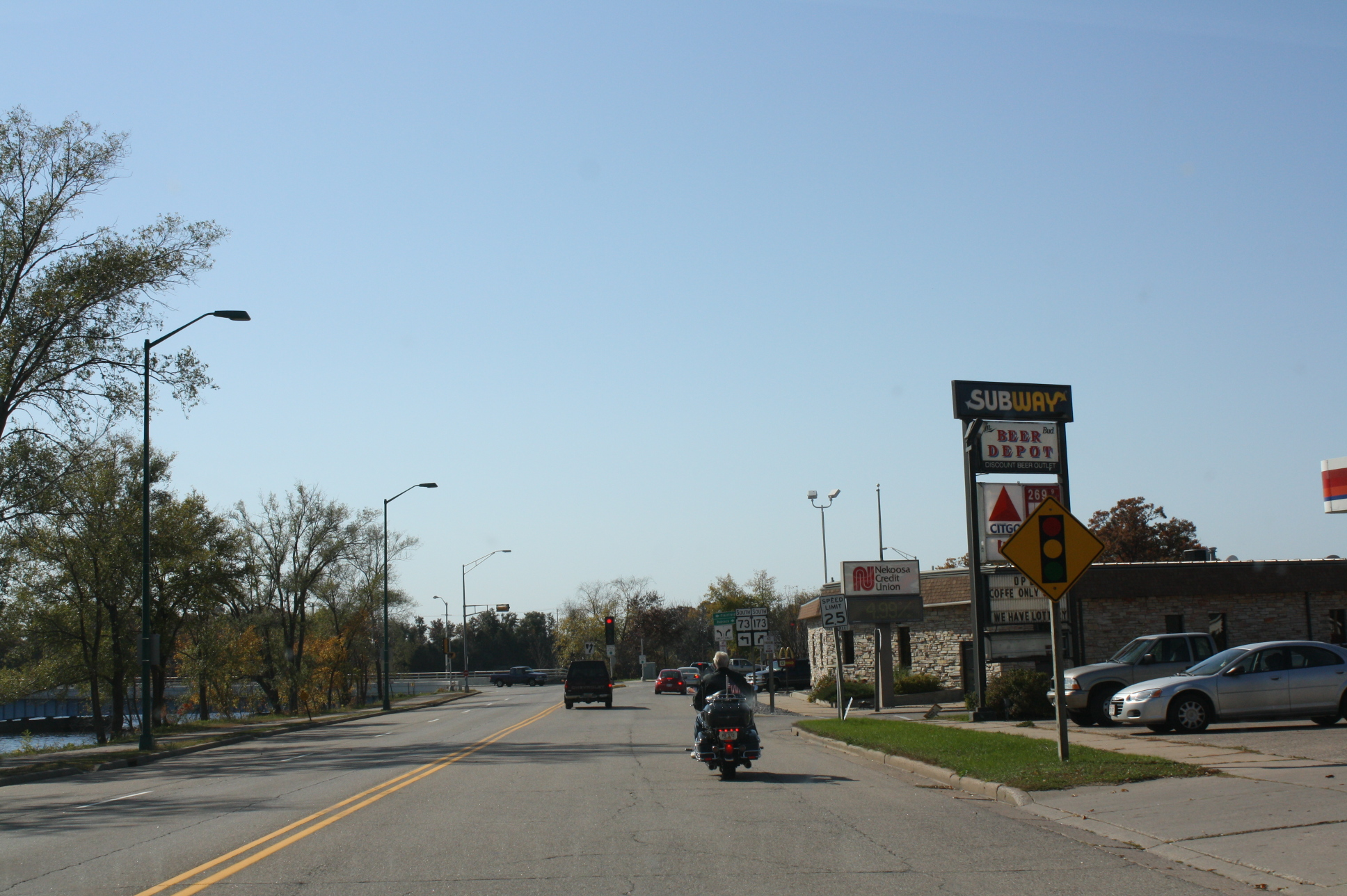
Looking south in downtown Nekoosa

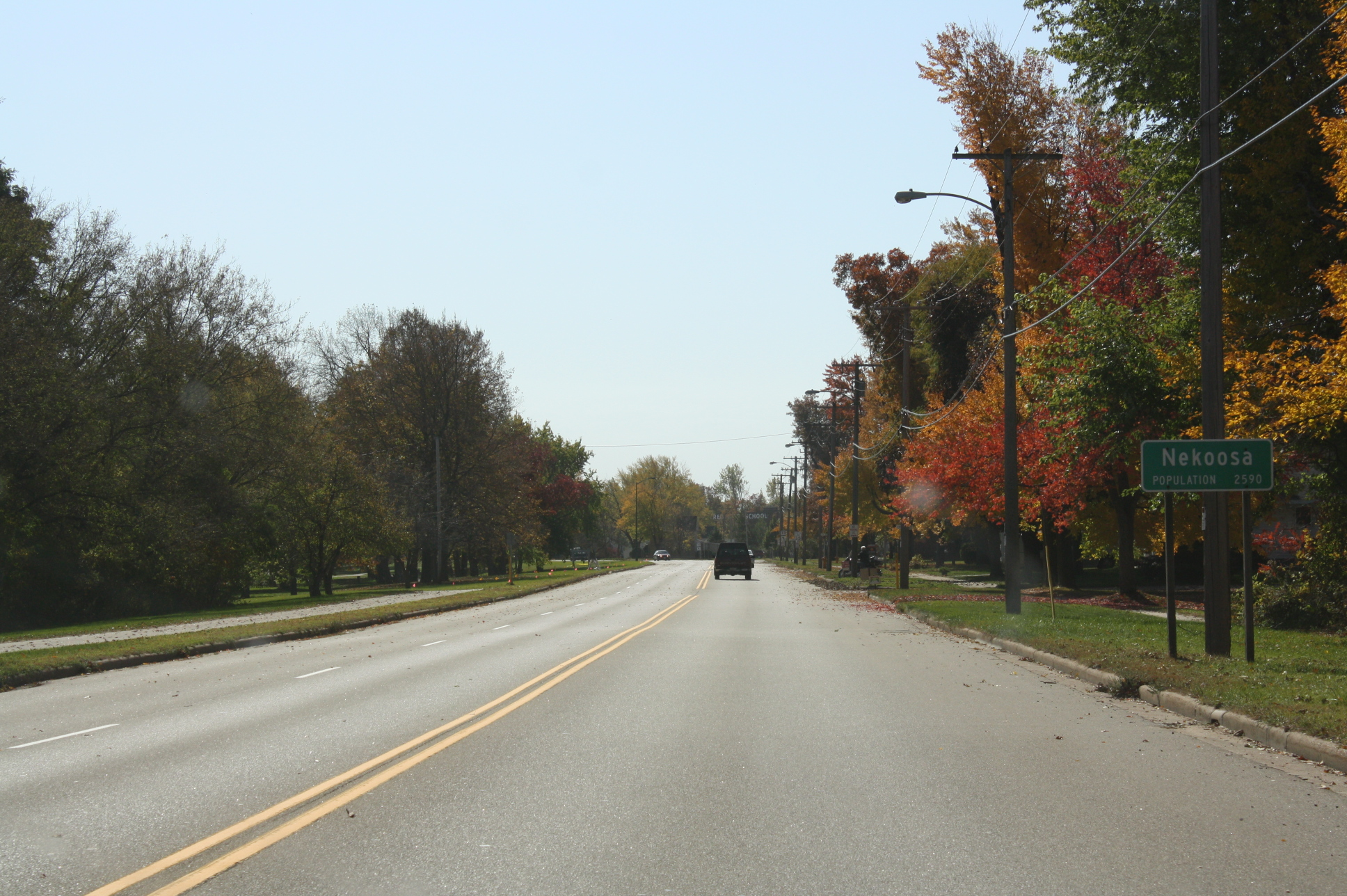
Sign on WIS 73

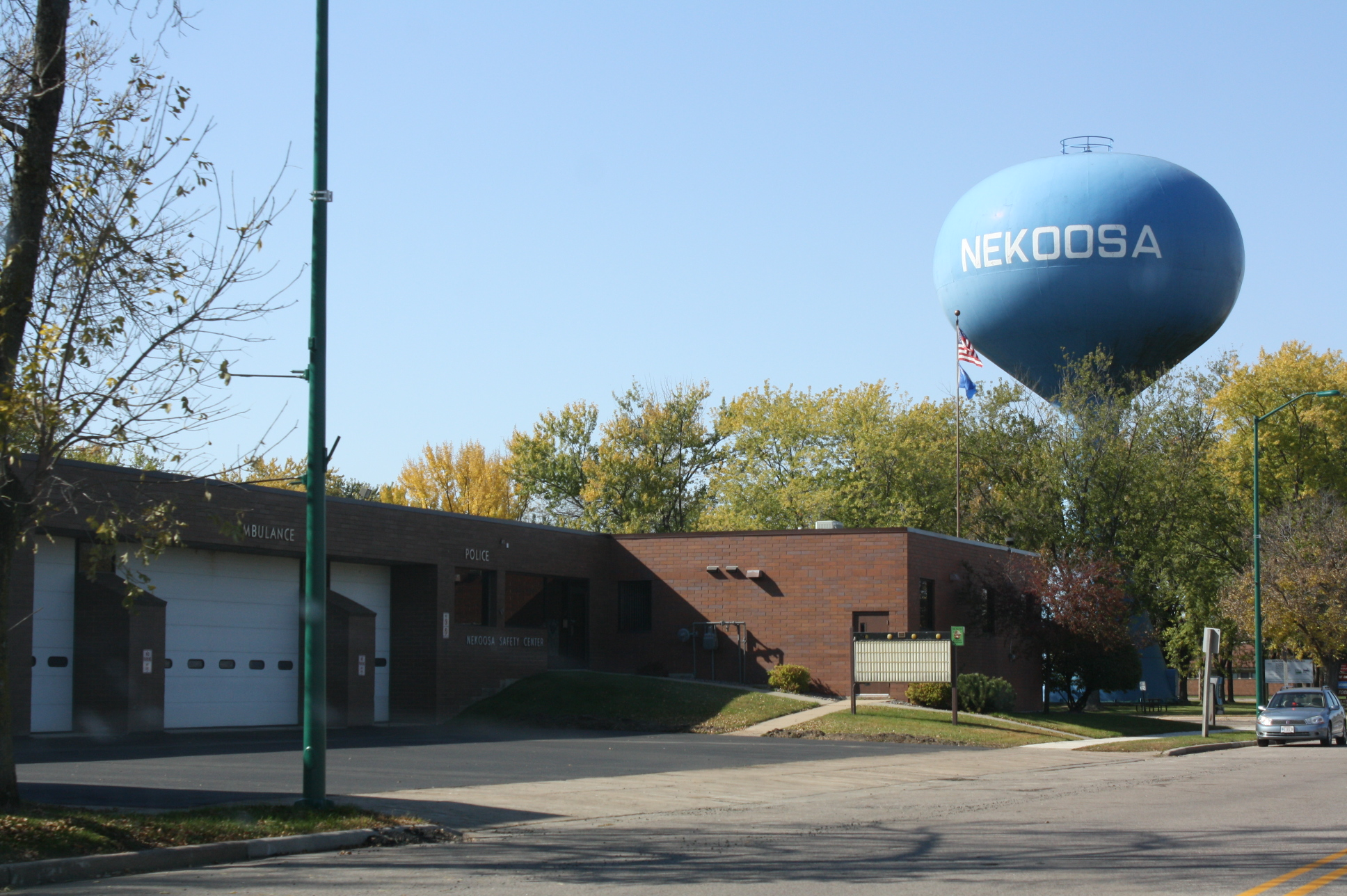
Police station and water tower

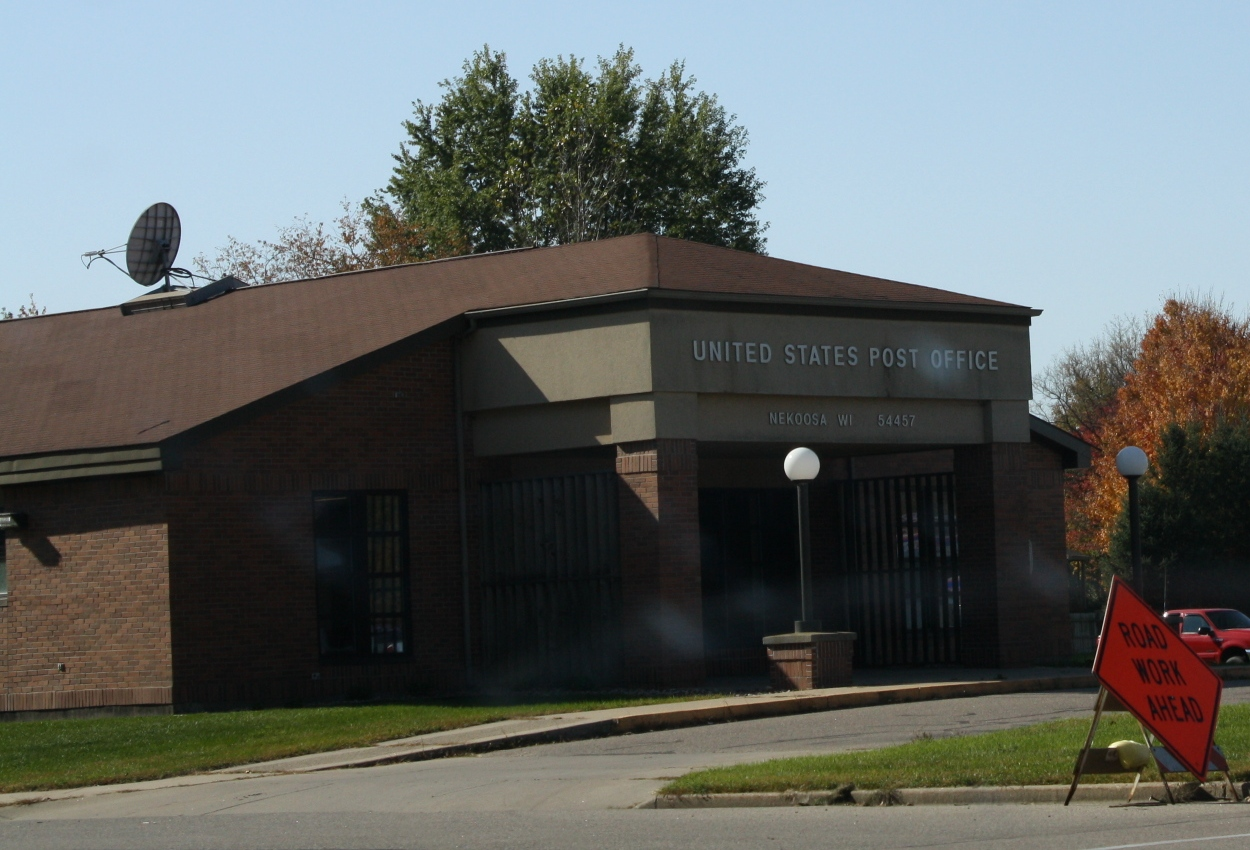
Post office

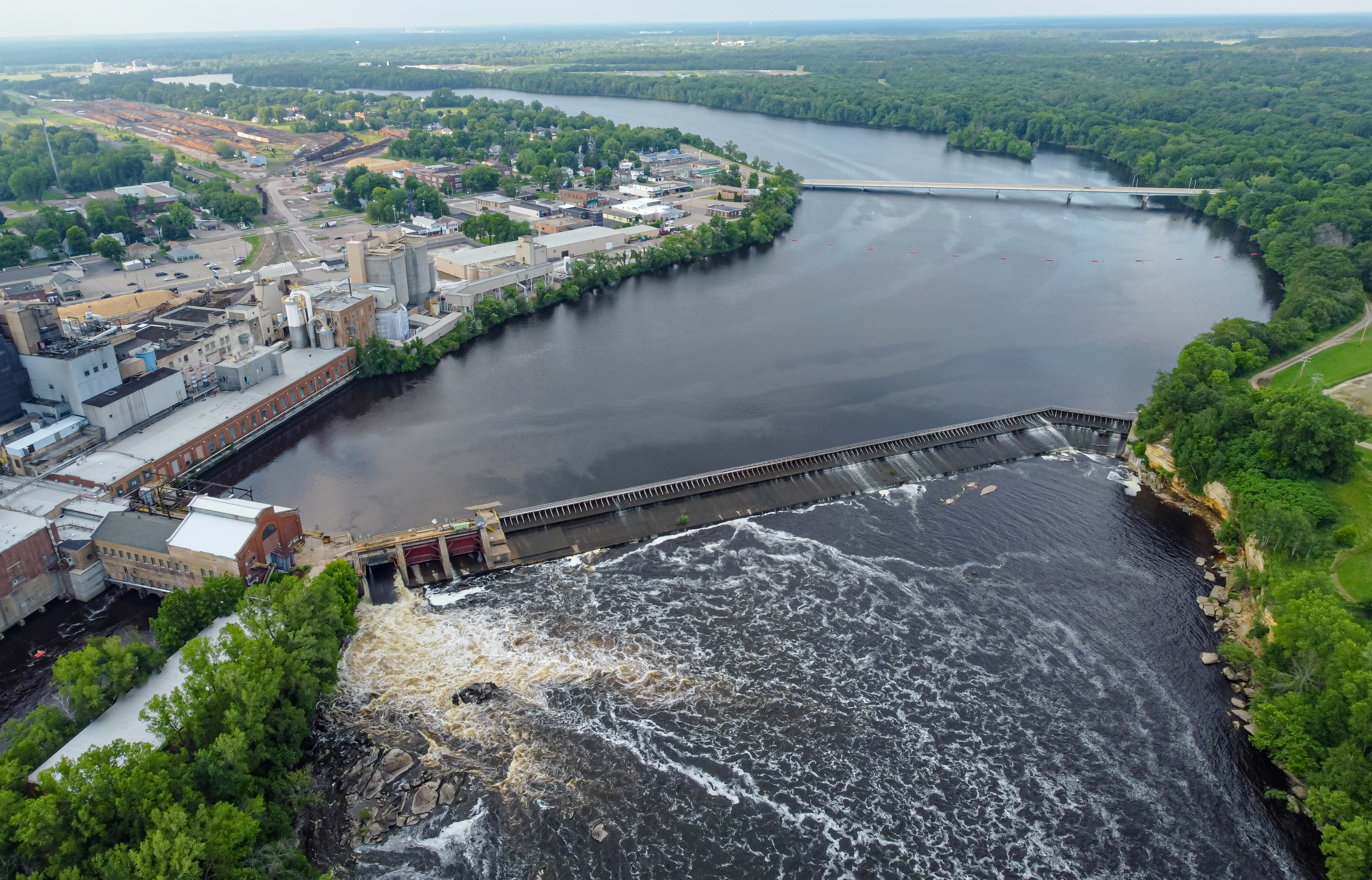
Nekoosa Dam on Wisconsin River

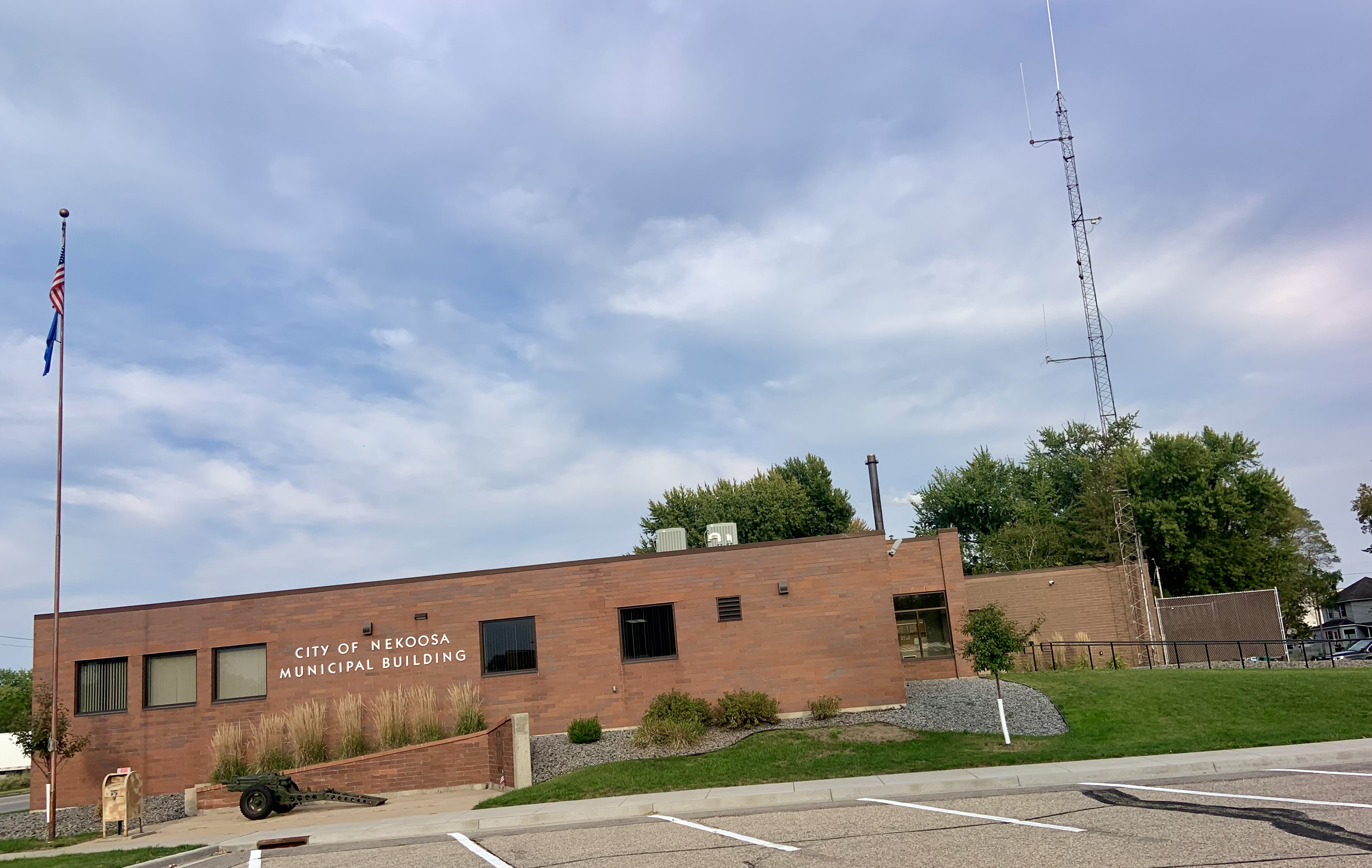
Nekoosa City Hall
