= Saturday Night Dead =

US television program

Saturday Night Dead is a television program that hosted B horror films on KYW-TV, Channel 3, at that time the NBC affiliate in Philadelphia, Pennsylvania. The program aired at 1:00am directly following Saturday Night Live, from September 29, 1984 to late October 1990, comprising 141 episodes. The show was a cult favorite from the start, with Karen Scioli winning a local acting Emmy in 1985.

== Stella ==
The program was hosted by Stella, dubbed "the Man-Eater From Manayunk" (a section near the Schuylkill River, a working-class neighborhood) and the "Daughter of Desire". Stella’s haunted condo was a playground for celebrities and comics including John Zacherle (aka "Roland"), Jane "Pixanne" Norman, Bill "Wee Willie" Webber, Rip Taylor, Sally Starr, Bobby Rydell, Robert Hazard, Channel 3’s anchors, reporters, weather people, and many local comics and Philadelphia icons. Stella delighted in half-clad, gorgeous young men and often had one or two hanging in her dungeon awaiting her pleasure. According to her biography, Stella was "born in North Libido, New Jersey, a small village outside of Atlantic City. She is the only child of traveling hecklers. Her parents dropped her in a plastic basket at Fifth and Shunk in front of Guido's Hair Weaving and Plumbing Supplies, but for all intents and purposes she was raised by a flock of pigeons." Reincarnated 37 times, Stella was just your typical "ghoul" next door.

Stella was portrayed by Karen Scioli, a South Philadelphia-born actress, writer and homemaker who weekly donned a push-up bra, slinky black dress, feather boa, false eyelashes, and a mole on her right cheek. As clarified by Scioli in the 2006 documentary film American Scary, Stella was not a vampiress or monster, she was instead a traditional, non-supernatural vamp. In 2012, Scioli/"Stella" was inducted into the Horror Host Hall of Fame.

Many Philadelphia and New York City-based actors worked on the program. Stella's butler "Skeeves" was initially portrayed by Bill Brown; when Brown departed the show, he was replaced by Bob Billbrough who then played "Hives".

Glenn Davish played "Cousin Mel"; mad scientist "Dr. Schuylkill" (playing off the Schuylkill River); faceless dungeon monster "Iggy" who ate those Stella didn't like; talking "Portrait" that gave sarcastic responses about whatever Stella was wisecracking. Nerdy "Mel" was told by everyone, in tribute to a character on The Dick Van Dyke Show played by Richard Deacon, to "Shut up, Mel." [Davish had appeared in Mannequin with Andrew McCarthy, Kim Cattrall and Estelle Getty.]

Other prominent regulars included Allen Fitzpatrick who appeared as Stella's love interest "Rhett Cutlet," a butcher from Manayunk who had been raised in the Old South. "Cutlet", a character devised by Fitzpatrick, was modeled on Clark Gable in Gone with the Wind. Fitzpatrick also portrayed Rhett's mother, "Veala Cutlet," and scores of other characters including a bimbo in the "LONESOME DIVA" story line (a parody of then-popular TV show Lonesome Dove). Other highly-featured regulars included Donna Ryan as whacked-out psychic "Madame Tofutti"; and Kathy Robinson in a variety of roles. (Stella's canopied bed, "Beda Lugosi", also appeared; the bed was notable for its both speaking and vibrating.)

Saturday Night Dead often featured the talent from KYW's local news production, Eyewitness News, including Howard Joffe.

The Duke Ellington Orchestra's recording of "The Mooche" was used as the show's theme song.

== Featured films ==
- Gamera: Super Monster directed by Noriaki Yuasa
- Night Fright directed by James A. Sullivan
- Shivers (a/k/a They Came From Within) directed by David Cronenberg (shown in a "Christmas in July" episode)
- The Tomb of Ligeia directed by Roger Corman
- Zombies of Sugar Hill directed by Paul Maslansky
- Zombie Lake directed by Jean Rollin
- Bluebeard
- Dracula vs. Frankenstein directed by Al Adamson
- The Legend of Boggy Creek "starring no one" as described by the Saturday Night Dead announcer during commercial bumpers

== Detroit version ==
There was also a film series dubbed "Saturday Night Dead" in Detroit, which likewise aired at 1:00am Sunday morning on the local NBC affiliate (WDIV-TV) after "Saturday Night Live". Unrelated to the Philadelphia version, the Detroit program had no on-air host and was less successful, debuting on September 16, 1979 and airing its last episode on June 6, 1981.
