= Dr. Gangrene =

American television horror host

- Larry Underwood as Dr. Gangrene.
- Born: Larry W. Underwood; September 9, 1966 (age 60); Nashville, Tennessee
- Presenting career
- Show: Dr. Gangrene's Cinetarium
- Station: Nashville Music City Arts CH9
- Time slot: Saturday @ 9pm central
- Country: United States
- Previous shows: Dr. Gangrene's Creature Feature, Dr. Gangrene Presents, Chiller Cinema - est. July 1, 1999
- Website: www.drgangrene.com

Dr. Gangrene is a television horror host based in the Middle Tennessee area, played by actor/writer/producer Larry Underwood.

== History ==
Underwood was inspired to create the character as an homage to Sir Cecil Creape, a former Nashville horror host. Created in 1999, the show was originally a half hour Public-access television cable TV program called Chiller Cinema in Hendersonville, Tennessee.

=== Chiller Cinema ===
The first episode aired July 1, 1999, on the Hendersonville, TN Public-access television station. The show quickly expanded into Nashville, TN where it aired on Community Access Channel 19. Chiller Cinema was the first program to broadcast live out of the new Public, Educational, and Government Access television building where CH 19 broadcast from. Chiller Cinema was soon seen on other Public-access television stations across the country, making Underwood one of the first horror hosts to self-syndicate his program. The show won much praise and accolades and was named one of the country's top 20 cable access TV programs by Gear Magazine.

=== Creature Feature on Nashville's CW58 ===
The show moved to Nashville's WB affiliate WNAB in 2005, and was renamed The WB58 Creature Feature, expanding to a two-hour format showing horror and Sci-Fi movies. Underwood later changed the name slightly to The CW58 Creature Feature to match WNAB's switchover from The WB to The CW in September 2006. The show ran through 2010.

=== Dr. Gangrene's Cinetarium ===
In celebration of his 20th anniversary as a TV horror host, Dr. Gangrene returned to the airwaves in 2019. The new show was called Dr. Gangrene's Cinetarium, and once again aired on Nashville's CW58 for the month of October, running for 4 episodes.

In January 2020 the show returned for a second season, this time on Nashville's NECAT Arts Ch9 in Nashville. The show airs weekly on Saturday nights at 9 pm central, and simulcasts on the station's website as well as their Roku channel.

== Awards and Media ==
- Gear Magazine named Dr. Gangrene's Chiller Cinema the 11th best cable access show in the country in the October 2000 issue.
- Dr. Gangrene has won 8 Rondo Classic Horror Awards to date.

2005 for BEST WEBSITE
2008 for his "Go Green with Dr. Gangrene" PSA Campaign (see below)
2014 for BEST HORROR BLOG
2016 for BEST SHORT FILM for "H.P. Lovecraft's The Beast in the Cave" (script by Underwood based on the H.P. Lovecraft story)
2016 for BEST COLUMNIST (for his Scary Monsters Magazine column)
2017 for BEST COLUMNIST (for his Scary Monsters Magazine column)
2018 for BEST COLUMNIST (for his Scary Monsters Magazine column)
2020 for BEST INTERVIEW -for his interview with Bruce Campbell in Scary Monsters Magazine #116

- On October 30, 2007, a photo of Dr. Gangrene alongside legendary horror host Zacherley appeared in USA Today along with a mention in an article about horror hosts.
- Dr. Gangrene appeared on Spike TV along with several other horror hosts introducing the film SANTA'S SLAY.
- In April 2010 Dr. Gangrene was featured in Rue Morgue Magazine #103 in an article spotlighting the top horror hosts from across the country.
- Doctor Gangrene has appeared in a number of other magazines including Rue Morgue, Horrorhound, Scary Monsters, Dark Realms, Mondo Cult, Outre, and many others.
- In 2011 Dr. Gangrene was nominated for 3 Emmy awards, one for the made for TV short film The Dreadful Hallowgreen Special, one for the PSA campaign GO GREEN WITH DR. GANGRENE, and one for Best Short-Form Writer for The Dreadful Hallowgreen Special.
- Larry has appeared in a number of movies as both himself and Dr. Gangrene, including the 2006 horror host documentary American Scary.
- In November 2011 Dr. Gangrene appeared in the nationally syndicated DICK TRACY comic strip over a 3-day period (although he was listed as Dr. Mean Green for copyright reasons). Day one he was mentioned, day two he appeared in a 3 panel strip, and day 3 was a 3-tier Sunday strip.
- On March 21, 2015, Dr. Gangrene was inducted into the Horror Host Hall of Fame. The ceremony was held at the Horrorhound Weekend Convention in Cincinnati, OH. Dr. Gangrene also gave the induction speech for Sir Cecil Creape.
- Dr. Gangrene appeared in an article about horror hosts in the October issue of The Saturday Evening Post.

Dr. Gangrene continues to stay busy, producing a weekly horror host TV program Dr. Gangrene's Cinetarium, which airs weekly on Nashville's NECAT Arts CH9 on Comcast out of Nashville, TN, Saturdays at 9pm central. He is a regular guest at the Wonderfest convention held annually in Louisville, Kentucky, where he hosts live movies every year. He also occasionally writes articles for Scary Monsters Magazine (interviews, reviews and essays on horror movies and creators).

== Go Green With Dr. Gangrene Campaign ==
In 2008, Dr. Gangrene appeared in a series of Public Service Announcements entitled Go Green With Dr. Gangrene. The initial three shorts were entitled "Bonehead", "Two Lane Trash Stop", and "Trash Day Of The Dead". The shorts were written by Cameron McCasland and Larry Underwood and directed by Cameron McCasland. The series went on to win several local and national awards, including an Emmy Nomination for McCasland, and citations from the Governor of Tennessee Phil Bredesen, and the Nashville City Council. In the 2008 Rondo Awards the PSAs were awarded a special Rondo Award in the Rondo Hatton Classic Horror Awards called "The Vasaria Public Service Rondo Award" http://www.rondoaward.com/rondo/RondoVIIwinners.htm

== Acting career ==
Larry Underwood has appeared in a number of independent films, as well as the documentary American Scary. However his best known work is as the Horror Host Dr. Gangrene on the long running WNAB television programs Dr. Gangrene's Creature Feature, and Dr. Gangrene Presents, as well as his earlier cable-access program Chiller Cinema and current program, Dr. Gangrene's Cinetarium.

== Comics and Writing ==
In 1994 Underwood co-founded OUT OF THE CELLAR COMICS (later changed to VOLUNTEER COMICS) with his longtime creative partner, Chuck Angell. Among the books they published was BEST CELLARS #1 in 1995, which featured the first-published work of Eric Powell, a story called MONSTER BOY, a precursor to The Goon. It was during this period he first started writing, first scripts for comics, then scripts for the television shows, and finally short stories. To date he has had a number of short stories published in various anthologies and magazines. In 2016 he published a collection of short stories called "Dr. Gangrene's Tales from Parts Unknown". He is a columnist for Scary Monsters Magazine where he researches and writes about horror and sci-fi cinema. In addition, he won a Rondo Award in 2014 for BEST HORROR BLOG.

== Musical Endeavors ==
- In 2005 Underwood performed a spoken intro on the Creeping Cruds CD, "The Incredibly Strange People Who Stopped Living and Became the Creeping Cruds." He also appeared on the CD in a spoken word bit in the middle of the song "All Hail the Horror Host" on that album. That CD was nominated for a 2005 Rondo Award for BEST CD.
- Dr Gangrene also provided the spoken intro and outro for the horror rock compilation CD "T-Boner's Rot-N-Roll Compilation from Hell," released in 2006.
- In 2009 Dr. Gangrene recreated a faux horror host episode at the start of the song "I Kicked Dracula's Ass" on the Creeping Cruds CD, "Tennessee Bloodbath." The bit spoofed tales of long lost Hollywood horror films and poked fun at ridiculous "Americanized" titles of imported Spanish horror films. A classic horror film that was lost in a fabled Hollywood fire is recovered from Dr. Gangrene's dungeon in Tennessee nearly 75 years later. Before Dr. Gangrene is able to screen the newfound film for his horror host audiences the film catches fire in the projector and is again lost for the ages.
- In 2009 Underwood formed a horror punk band called Spookhand. Underwood fronted the band, appearing in a number of outlandish costumes and masks. The band broke up in 2011.
- Underwood provides the voice of a deranged killer truck driver on the 2010 CD Mark of the Psycho by the band Psychocharger. That CD was nominated for a 2010 Rondo Award for BEST CD.
- Dr. Gangrene produced a 10th anniversary compilation CD called THE BLOODWATERS OF DR. G (He also voiced the intro for it), featuring a compilation of bands from the Horror Hootenanny rock concert held annually in Nashville, TN during the Halloween season and hosted by Dr. Gangrene. This CD was nominated for a Rondo Award in 2014.
- In Fall, 2014 Dr. Gangrene voiced the intro for ATTACK OF THE MUTANTS, a tribute CD for the band Impaler. Underwood also wrote the liner notes for the Cd.

== Personal life ==
Larry Underwood was born in Nashville, TN, and currently lives in Hendersonville, Tennessee.
