= Englewood Cinema =

Move theater in Englewood, Ohio, USA

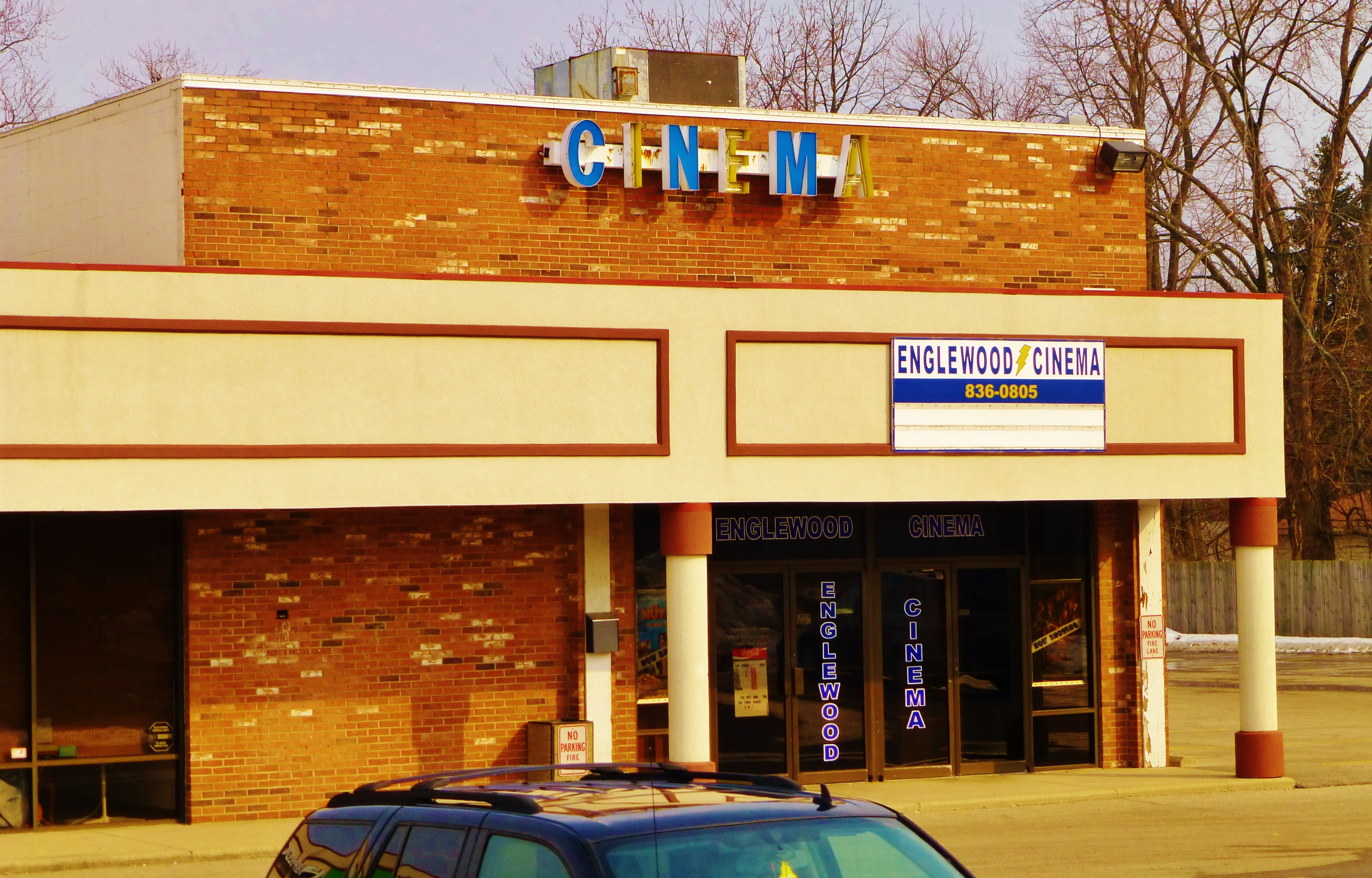

- Location within Ohio Location within the United States
- Former names: Country Square Cinema
- Address: 320 National Rd #21; Englewood, Ohio; United States
- Coordinates: 39°52′30″N 84°18′27″W
- Owner: Cory and Alyssa Floyd
- Seating type: Theater seats
- Capacity: 230
- Type: Cinema
- Event: Films
- Screen: 1
- Parking: ~40

Construction
- Built: 1976
- Opened: 1976
- Renovated: October 2019
- Closed: 2015–2019

Website
- englewoodcinema.com

The Englewood Cinema, is a one-screen movie theater located in Englewood, Ohio.

The theater was the location of the horror film and charity event, Horrorama, hosted by Dayton's Dr. Creep for several years. It has held special events to draw in audiences including bringing in traveling movie exhibitions.

== History of ownership ==
Located in the Country Square Shopping Center, the cinema has operated under different management over the years.

- 1976: first opened
- 1978–1993: The theater was purchased by Barry Weaver and first opened as the Country Square Cinema and was later renamed Englewood Cinema. The Englewood Cinema was one of five theaters that Weaver owned.
- Until 2008: Brenda and Tom Baker
- 2008–2015: Owned by Mike and Michelle Snell. Mike Snell cited costly and necessary digital projection upgrades as cause for closure.
- 2019–2021: George Rand and Luke Sowers.
- 2021–present: Cory and Alyssa Floyd
