= Frederick C. Peerenboom =

American radio and TV broadcaster

Frederick C. Peerenboom, better known as Fritz the Nite Owl (born December 27, 1934, in Nekoosa, Wisconsin), is an American radio and television personality in Columbus, Ohio.

== Early career ==
Peerenboom's professional radio career began in 1959 after his honorable discharge from the U.S. Army Signal Corps. While in the Army, he was stationed at the Signal Corps Pictorial Center (formerly the Paramount Studios New York facility). Here he narrated, acted in, and wrote numerous army promotional and training films. He expanded his knowledge of the visual techniques and effects that could be created on TV, which he subsequently used on his TV show.

He made a few visual appearances in the DC comic book, "The Power Of Shazam!", in which he helped Captain Marvel and Superman save the universe. Among his many freelance narrations and acting performances, he was the voice of "Green Lantern" in the short-lived Warner Video Comics series.

== Nite Owl Theatre ==
Fritz is best known for hosting "Nite Owl Theatre" on WBNS-TV from 1974 to 1991. He would add improvised humorous commentaries over jazz music between segments of the film and the commercial breaks. Along with these commentaries, his unique visual introductions, mid-breaks, and closes helped him win five Emmy Awards for his TV performances.

His show, "Nite Owl Jazz: What's New in Jazz for the 21st Century," ran for seventeen years.

Fritz resumed hosting movies in October 2010 with a showing of Night of the Living Dead at Grandview Theatre in Columbus. The new series is a reboot of the original Nite Owl Theatre and is written by Peerenboom and directed, produced and edited by filmmaker Mike McGraner. He currently records one movie with host bumper segments and vintage commercials per month. The movies premiere at Grandview Theatre, usually on the last Saturday of the month.

In January 2012, the live showing of his monthly internet version of Nite Owl Theatre moved from the Grandview Theatre to Studio 35 on Indianola Avenue in Columbus, OH, and in 2014 moved to the Gateway Film Center and has been showing episodes there since.

In March 2012, Fritz was inducted into the Horror Host Hall of Fame along with Elvira, Joe Bob Briggs and a few other nationally known horror hosts at HorrorHound Weekend in Columbus.

Fritz is also featured in a book titled, American Scary recently written by Michael Monahan, released in December 2011.

In his book "From the Black Chair: 365 Horror Movie Reviews", author Joshua P. Mogan credits Fritz and Nite Owl Theatre for helping introduce him to horror films.

== Awards and honors ==
Fritz has earned five regional Emmys for his performance on the original show through 1974 to 1991. He received a 6th Emmy in 2013 for his work on the reboot of the series that began in 2010.
