= September Affair =

1950 film by William Dieterle

- Directed by: William Dieterle
- Written by: Fritz Rotter; Robert Thoeren; Andrew Solt
- Produced by: Hal B. Wallis
- Starring: Joan Fontaine; Joseph Cotten; Jessica Tandy; Françoise Rosay; Jimmy Lydon; Robert Arthur
- Cinematography: Charles B. Lang; Victor Milner
- Edited by: Warren Low
- Music by: Victor Young; Kurt Weill; Sergei Rachmaninoff
- Distributed by: Paramount Pictures
- Release dates: August 25, 1950 (Venice); September 14, 1950 (Rome); February 1, 1951 (US)
- Running time: 104 minutes
- Country: United States
- Languages: English; Italian
- Box office: $1,425,000 (US rentals)

September Affair is a 1950 American romantic drama film directed by William Dieterle and starring Joan Fontaine, Joseph Cotten, and Jessica Tandy. It was produced by Hal B. Wallis.

== Plot ==
Marianne "Manina" Stuart (Joan Fontaine), a prominent concert pianist, meets David Lawrence (Joseph Cotten), a businessman, on a flight from Rome to New York. Their plane is diverted to Naples for engine repairs, and they decide to kill time by doing some sight-seeing.

At lunch, a recording of the Kurt Weill/Maxwell Anderson song "September Song", sung by Walter Huston, is playing. Manina is single, and David is unhappily married with a son in his late teens. They talk too long and miss their flight, and decide to stay on for a few days, getting to know each other. They quickly fall in love.

Then they hear that the plane they were scheduled to catch has crashed into the ocean, and all on board are presumed dead. Due to a clerical mixup, they were believed to have been among those aboard. A list of the victims is published in a newspaper they pick up. Thinking their absences will not make any difference to the larger world, they decide to "stay dead" and begin a new life together in Florence. They make no contact with their families or friends, including Lawrence's wife Catherine (Jessica Tandy) and son David Jr. (Robert Arthur).

Manina had been originally intending to play Rachmaninoff's Piano Concerto No. 2 in New York, and she keeps up her practice during the secret affair. She also has contact with piano teacher Maria Salvatini (Françoise Rosay), who agrees not to reveal Manina is very much alive, but continues to tutor her.

David transfers a large sum of money to Maria Salvatini by issuing a check dated prior to the flight. They use the money as a nest egg for their life in Florence. Catherine and her son travel to Florence after hearing of this transfer to try to find out any more on David's fate from the woman he gave the money to. David Jr recognizes Manina's face from the list of presumed dead and puts two and two together that his father is alive. After this David's wife writes him a note and then leaves. Knowing their secret is out, Manina goes on to perform the Rachmaninoff concerto as originally planned in New York. In the end, Manina realizes she can't stay with David, that they tried to hide from the past but it caught up with them, and after her concert leaves, bidding David goodbye at the airport.

== Cast ==
- Joan Fontaine as Manina Stuart
- Joseph Cotten as David Lawrence
- Françoise Rosay as Maria Salvatini
- Jessica Tandy as Catherine Lawrence
- Robert Arthur as David Lawrence Jr.
- Jimmy Lydon as Johnny Wilson
- Fortunio Bonanova as Grazzi
- Grazia Narciso as Bianca
- Anna Demetrio as Rosita
- Lou Steele as Vittorio Portini
- Frank Yaconelli as Mr. Peppino
- Hal B. Wallis makes an uncredited cameo appearance as a tourist in a souvenir shop.

== Music and costumes ==
The primary music score was written by Victor Young.

"September Song" from the musical Knickerbocker Holiday (music by Kurt Weill, lyrics by Maxwell Anderson), is used at moments throughout this film, initially in the recording by Walter Huston. Later, Johnny Wilson (Jimmy Lydon), a sailor, sings "September Song" live. Huston's recording had been made in 1938, but the film gave it a new lease of life and it made it to the top of the 1950 hit parade.

Excerpts from Rachmaninoff's Piano Concerto No. 2 are heard a number of times throughout the film. The pianist in the Rachmaninoff was Leonard Pennario. The voice of Enrico Caruso is also heard in an off-screen recording.

The costume design was by Edith Head. The film was shot on location in Naples, Capri, Florence, and other places in Italy.

== Reception ==
Critic Bosley Crowther, in his review for The New York Times, called this film a "rambling drama" and a "banal adventure" in which producer Hal B. Wallis and his team "have set down a hopelessly silly story in front of some beautiful scenery and a haunting song."
