= Creature Features (1969 TV series) =

- Title for WNEW Channel 5's Creature Features
- Genre: Horror
- Presented by: Lou Steele
- Country of origin: United States

Production
- Production location: New York City Metro Area
- Running time: 2 hours

Original release
- Network: WNEW

Related
- Chiller Theatre, Fright Night

Creature Features a classic horror film show broadcast in the New York Metropolitan Area, on WNEW, Channel 5 (Metromedia Broadcasting). It was hosted by Lou Steele (The Creep), who became familiar to Channel 5 viewers for starting off the 10 o'clock News by asking: "It's 10 p.m.; do you know where your children are?"

== History ==
Creature Features first aired from July to August 1969 on a test run, and was found to be a hit. The movies broadcast were taken from the classic horror movies of the 1930s and 1940s, the horror and science-fiction films of the 1950s, British horror films of the 1960s, and the Japanese "giant monster" movies of the 1960s, and early 1970s. It was continued on the air from November 1969 to August 1973, but was cancelled due to poor ratings and competition from WPIX's Chiller Theatre.

== The movies ==
Creature Features normally showed classic Universal Horror, like Dracula, Frankenstein, Bride of Frankenstein, The Mummy, plus many Boris Karloff and Bela Lugosi films and others.

They also aired all the movies produced and distributed by American International Pictures. This included all the Roger Corman B-movies of the 1950s and 1960s like The Raven, and The Terror, plus most of the Japanese "monster movies" produced by Toho Studios, and Daiei Motion Picture Company (famous for their Godzilla and Gamera movies).

They also broadcast all the best British horror films by Hammer Film Productions, like The Quatermass Xperiment, The Curse of Frankenstein, Dracula: Prince of Darkness, The Phantom of the Opera, The Curse of the Werewolf, and The Hound of the Baskervilles. Also Amicus Productions, and Tigon British Film Productions films such as Dr. Terror's House of Horrors, and The House That Dripped Blood.

But what became most well known about Creature Features is the airing of all the 1950s science fiction movies. These included Them!, The Thing from Another World, It Came from Outer Space, It! The Terror from Beyond Space, The War of the Worlds, and Forbidden Planet.

== Seasons ==
The following is a checklist and brief broadcast history of the Creature Features horror movie showcase:

- Promo Season
  - July–August 1969 (7:30 p.m. Saturday)
- 1st Season
  - November 1969 – September 1970 (8:30 p.m. Saturday)
- 2nd Season (Double Feature)
  - October 1970 – September 1971 (12:00 Noon, 8:30 p.m. Saturday)
- 3rd Season
  - November 1971 – June 1972 (8:30 p.m. Friday)
- 4th Season
  - July–September 1972 (7:30 Friday)
- 5th Season (Double Feature)
  - October–September 1972 (12:00 Noon, 11:30 p.m. Saturday)
- 6th Season
  - October–December 1972 (12:00 Noon Saturday)
- 7th Season
  - January– March 1973 (8:30 p.m. Saturday)
- 8th Season
  - April–June 1973 (12:00 Noon Saturday)
- 9th Season (Double Feature)
  - July–August 1973 (12:00 Noon, 8:30 p.m. Saturday)

In late 1973 Creature Features was dropped from its nighttime slot and replaced by football games and other programming (although the Saturday's horror movies continued with Chiller Theater). When horror movies eventually returned to Saturday night, they would usually air in a late night timeslot. The daytime version, during the second and fifth seasons, was usually entitled "Jeepers Creepers" (with a cartoon figure metamorphing into a troll-like monster a la Dr. Jekyll & Mr. Hyde).

Creature Features would resurface at odd intervals, specifically during 1976–1978, but none of these runs lasted for very long. Lou Steele, The Creep himself, died of a heart attack in February 2001.

== 1979-1980 re-broadcast ==
In November 1979, Channel 5 began rebroadcasting some of the old Creature Features shows. Instead of airing in its old 8:30 p.m. slot, Creature Features became a late night showcase, showing a triple feature with each airing. The first movie went out under the familiar Creature Features name, the second movie was Son of Creature Features and the third film was shown as Revenge of Creature Features. Once again poor ratings and competition with WPIX caused its cancellation in May 1980.

== Lou Steele ==
Unlike other horror hosts, Steele didn't utilize any ghoulish make-up or trappings, instead striking a somewhat sinister/hipster attitude with sunglasses and harsh lighting. Among various contests and gimmicks during the show's run was "Creature Quotes", in which individual words of a longer phrase ("A stitch in time saves Frankenstein", "Don't get chummy with the Mummy") were flashed momentarily on the bottom of the screen at various times during the movie.

== Intro music ==
The intro music for Creature Features was Herman Stein's "Visitors from Space" from the score of the 1953 film It Came from Outer Space. The track was most likely taken from the 1959 Dick Jacobs LP, Themes from Horror Movies (Coral 757240).

== See also ==
- Creature Features Syndicated show
