= Lou Steele =

American actor, radio, and television announcer (1928-2001)

Louis J. (Lou) Steele
- Born: Louis Ferraioli; March 7, 1928; Brooklyn, New York, U.S.
- Died: February 25, 2001 (aged 72); Paterson, New Jersey, U.S.
- Years active: 1952-1990

Louis J. "Lou" Steele (March 7, 1928 – February 25, 2001) was an American actor, radio, and television announcer.

== Career ==
Born Louis Ferraioli in 1928, he was an announcer on Armed Forces Radio during the Korean War, and was the voice who informed the troops that their commander, General Douglas MacArthur, had been recalled by President Harry S Truman. Beginning in the 1950s, Lou was an announcer on WNEW-TV Channel 5 out of New York City.

Prior to this, he was a staff announcer on radio station WPAT in Paterson, New Jersey. In the late 1980s, Steele was an anchor of a nightly newscast on a low-power television station in New York.

Steele voiced the catch phrase, coined by his announcer-booth colleague Tom Gregory: "It's 10 P.M. Do you know where your children are?" In addition, in the early 1980s Steele voiced another brief public service announcement for the station, "It's 7 P.M. Did you hug your child today?"

While on at WNEW-TV Lou was also the host for the local horror show Creature Features (1969–1973). Known as "The Creep," Lou would appear without the normal make-up or costume typical of horror hosts of the day. He wore sunglasses and a tuxedo and appeared on a plain studio set with harsh lighting. At various times, Lou would conduct contests that involved coming up with trivia questions, made-up quotes spoofing notable horror film titles, or flashing parts of a title at select times throughout that night’s movie. Contest winners were announced on air.

== Death ==
Steele died on February 25, 2001, in his home in Paterson, New Jersey, of a heart attack, aged 72.

== Filmography ==
- Some of My Best Friends Are... (1971)
- The Pawn (1968)
- September Affair (1950)
- The Furies (1950)
