= Bill Camfield =

American actor (1929–91)

- Born: William Joseph Camfield; June 27, 1929; Mineral Wells, Texas, U.S.
- Died: September 30, 1991 (aged 62); Fort Worth, Texas, U.S.
- Occupations: Actor, television personality

William Joseph Camfield (June 27, 1929 – September 30, 1991) was a popular television personality in Fort Worth, Texas, in the 1950s and 1960s. He is best known as Icky Twerp, host of the kids’ show Slam Bang Theatre, and Gorgon, host of the horror film series Nightmare.

== Early life ==
Camfield was born in Mineral Wells, Texas, the son of a coal miner, Joseph E. Johnston Camfield. Following his father's death in 1935, Camfield and his mother moved to Fort Worth. Camfield graduated from Carter-Riverside High School in 1947, and in 1948 went to work as a copy writer for the ad department of Leonard's Department Store. Two years later, the store asked Camfield to write a locally produced television show, “Hometown Harmony.” As he had some performing experience (having appeared in Christmas stage shows with Paul Jung, the famed Ringling Brothers Barnum and Bailey Circus clown), Camfield also starred in the show. Following the show's success, the store promoted him to Radio-TV Director, in which capacity he produced and starred in several shows over the next five years, including “Let’s Go Shopping,” “Man about Music,” “Billboard,” and “Meet the Candidate.”

== Career ==
In 1954, Camfield went to work for the newly created independent television station in Fort Worth, KFJZ-TV Channel 11 (now KTVT), writing advertising copy, creating original programming, and often acting in the programs and commercials he created. For instance, he provided the voice for Hoover the Movie Hound, the puppet co-host of "Million Dollar Matinee," and portrayed Mortimer Moolah on a long-running series of commercials for Texas Consumer Finance. During this time, he also married and started a family, and attended Texas Christian University on a writing scholarship. He graduated from TCU with an English degree in 1957.

In 1957, KFJZ purchased the SHOCK horror film package from Screen Gems and began airing these films (primarily Universal Horror classics) on Saturday nights. Camfield portrayed the host of the show, Gorgon, an eerie, black-caped character with a sinister laugh. The show was an immediate hit, receiving national attention in magazines such as Life, Saturday Evening Post, TV Guide, and Famous Monsters of Filmland. In 1959, the show went on hiatus, except for annual Halloween specials. In 1962, it was again broadcast on a weekly basis and remained on the air until 1964. Later, in 1972 and 1976, the show was revived for two Halloween specials.

Camfield's other popular character was Icky Twerp (shortened from "Ichamore Twerpwhistle"), host of Slam-Bang Theatre, a morning, before-school kids’ show which presented cartoons and Three Stooges comedies. Icky Twerp was a goofy character in horn-rimmed glasses, striped suit, tousled hair, and an undersized cowboy hat who performed in slapstick skits with two sidekicks in ape masks, Ajax and Delphinium. (A third ape, Arkadelphia, was added later.) The character acquired legendary status in the Dallas-Fort Worth area, and is fondly remembered by his many now grown-up fans, including actor/director Bill Paxton (who used Slam-Bang Theatre footage in his film Frailty, a murder mystery set in 1960s Fort Worth) and underground comics artists Mack White and Gary Panter'.

In 1965, the Three Stooges invited Camfield, along with several other kids’ show hosts from across the country, to act in their final feature film The Outlaws Is Coming (1965), playing the role of Wyatt Earp.

Camfield's Icky Twerp character continued to be regularly seen on Channel 11 until 1972, after which he left Fort Worth to work as promotions director for a television station in Denver, Colorado. Later, he returned to the Dallas-Fort Worth area to work in sales for KDAF-TV Channel 33. In 1985, he revived the Icky Twerp character on a KDAF show called Icky Twerp's Summer Reunion. With his son, Paul, Camfield performed new skits which were interlaced with summer-themed movies. In 1989, KDAF-TV produced a Slam Bang Theater 30th Anniversary special. Hosted by legendary Dallas-Fort Worth radio and television personality Ron Chapman, the show was taped before a live audience at the Comedy Corporation in Arlington and included clips from his 30-year career. In addition, the Governor of Texas and the State Legislature passed a proclamation declaring "Icky Twerp Day."

During this time, Camfield also wrote a column about growing up in Mineral Wells for the Mineral Wells Index and for the Fort Worth Star-Telegram's StarText computer service.

== Death ==
In 1991, Camfield died of brain cancer at his Fort Worth home. After his death, his family established a scholarship for humor and satire in his name at Texas Christian University. His son, Paul, maintains a website in his memory, the Official Icky Twerp Website, which features biographical information, as well as photographs and ephemera from his father's archives; he also makes videotapes of his father's shows available to fans.

In 2001, the Dallas Video Festival posthumously awarded Camfield the Ernie Kovacs Award for “slapstick genius.”
