= Doctor Madblood =

Horror host of a television show

Doctor Madblood was a horror host character who appeared in Doctor Madblood's Movie (1975—1982, 1989—2002), Doctor Madblood's Nightvisions (1982—1989), and Doctor Madblood Presents (2002—2007).

The character was created for a Halloween television special that aired on WAVY-TV in Tidewater, Virginia on November 4, 1975. The special was a series of comedy vignettes wrapped around the horror film Universal's House of Frankenstein. Two weeks later, the show became a weekly series which aired at 1:00 a.m. on Saturday nights.

== 1975-1982: Doctor Madblood's Movie ==
Each week Doctor Madblood's Movie presented a film from the Universal 77 Horror Hits package. Comedy vignettes were shown before and after the film and before and after each commercial break, featuring Doctor Madblood (a fictional retired mad scientist from Pungo, Virginia) and various other characters. Doctor Madblood was played by Jerry Harrell.

The series spawned a fan club and several fan conventions.

== 1982-1989: Doctor Madblood's Nightvision ==
In 1982, following a seven-year run on WAVY-TV, the series moved to the Tidewater public television station WHRO-TV, where it was renamed Doctor Madblood's Nightvisions and syndicated to public television stations in Virginia. Following a two-season run, the show continued in weekly syndication on six cable outlets in New England throughout the 1980s.

The Doctor also returned to Tidewater television screens with a prime-time Halloween special on WAVY-TV in 1984, Doctor Madblood's Halloween Howl, which wrapped around the 1960 Hammer Studios film The Brides of Dracula. For the first time, this special incorporated Doctor Madblood and other characters from the vignettes into the movie itself. Another Halloween special on WAVY-TV followed in 1986, with an all-night triple feature marathon.

== 1989-2002: Doctor Madblood's Movie ==
In 1989, Doctor Madblood's Movie returned to weekly television in Tidewater on the local Fox affiliate WTVZ-TV. In this incarnation, Doctor Madblood was joined by series regulars Mike Arlo and Craig T. Adams, who had become the voice of Brain as well as many other characters, and newcomer Penny Palen, who portrayed the doctor's nurse Patience Dream. Also joining the regular cast was Carter Perry, who became one of Madblood's monsters, Ernie K. Carter's affiliation with the program began as an editor on "Nightvisions" and "Halloween Howl," and as a director and producer during the WTVZ-TV years.

The program continued on WTVZ until the spring of 2002. During that time, the show celebrated both its 20th and 25th anniversaries, re-uniting cast members from various versions of the series.

== 2002-2007: Doctor Madblood Presents ==
In the fall of 2002, Doctor Madblood moved into a weekly prime-time slot on WSKY-TV, which broadcast in the Tidewater (now known as Hampton Roads) market on cable channel four. In this incarnation, known as Doctor Madblood Presents The Friday Night Frights, the show wrapped around episodes of television series, similar to Alfred Hitchcock Presents and Boris Karloff's Thriller.

In 2004, the program moved to prime-time on Saturday nights, becoming simply Doctor Madblood Presents, and wrapping around Rod Serling’s Night Gallery. This version of the show included the celebration of Doctor Madblood's 30th year on television.

Doctor Madblood Presents concluded its run on WSKY-TV in August 2007, bringing to a close the doctor's television career.

== Reunions ==
In 2007, "Doctor Madblood's Halloween Horror Express" went back to the "Halloween Howl" concept, with the characters Nurse Dream, Dusty the Cropduster and Grinfield appearing in scenes of the movie "Horror Express".

For 2009, the characters returned with "Doctor Madblood's Haunted Halloween". The characters Grinfield and Kid Exorcist appeared in House on Haunted Hill". For the first time the party scenes featured a live band, Phoebus Rio.

For Halloween 2010, the characters appeared in the 35th anniversary of the series' debut with a party and a showing of Christopher Lee's Horror Hotel as well as 35 clips from the various Doctor Madblood shows.
