= Tarantula Ghoul =

American actress (1931–1982)

Suzanne Waldron (July 23, 1931 - June 1982), better known by her alias "Tarantula Ghoul", was an American actress, television hostess, and musician. Between 1957 and 1959, she hosted the cult favorite program House of Horror on the Portland-based television station KPTV. With her backing band the Gravediggers, Tarantula Ghoul recorded "King Kong" and "Graveyard Rock", the latter of which became associated and popularized with Halloween-themed music. Following her role as Tarantula Ghoul, Waldron continued to act in the 1960s and 1970s.

== Biography ==
Suzanne Waldron was born in Portland, Oregon, in July 1931. Her studies at the New Mexico Highlands University in the early 1950s first excited her interests in stage acting and radio commentary. By 1952, Waldron began performing at the Portland Civic Auditorium and earning voice roles in radio commercials; a year later, Waldron joined the Magic Ring Repertory Company, receiving local acclaim for her roles in comedy and drama.

Waldron's appearance as a witch in a staging of Macbeth caught the attention of producers from the television station KPTV. Their management hired Waldron as the late-night personality "Tarantula Ghoul" for their upcoming variety show House of Horror. The concept of the Tarantula Ghoul character—a slick raven-haired hostess that had a striking resemblance to the fictional matriarch Morticia Addams—was based on Vampira, played by actress Maila Nurmi. Nurmi's series The Vampira Show, which briefly aired in 1954 and 1955, was highly successful in Los Angeles before its cancellation, encouraging television stations across the United States to recreate the show's premise as well as its ghoulish hostess.

House of Horror premiered on October 9, 1957, airing at 10:30 pm on Wednesdays. The program adapted characteristics from the format of The Vampira Show: Like her predecessor, Tarantula Ghoul introduced campy B-rated horror films and acted in various satirical comedic segments. Other cast members included the grave robber-turned-gardener Milton (John Hillsbury); Baby, a boa constrictor and Sir Galahad the pet tarantula. Waldron promoted House of Horror by appearing at public events in character, customarily making a grand entrance by emerging from a coffin. In 1958, Tarantula Ghoul and her backing band the Gravediggers recorded and released the "King Kong" single on Meadows Records with "Graveyard Rock" as its B-side. The latter track's appealing melody made it a popular song to incorporate in Halloween-themed setlists.

Despite its popularity, House of Horror was canceled in 1959 when it was discovered Waldron was pregnant out of wedlock; she married KPTV employee John Petty a year later. No known footage of the show currently exists. Waldron occasionally revived her Tarantula Ghoul persona in the early 1960s and was offered opportunities to host television again but she decided to focus on stage acting and voiceover work. In June 1982, she died in Omaha, Nebraska of colon cancer; Waldron was 50 years old.
