= Count Scary =

Television presenter

Count Scary was a character (portrayed by Detroit, Michigan-area radio disc jockey Tom Ryan) who hosted monthly specials presenting B movie horror films with comedy skits on Detroit television station WDIV from 1982 to the early 1990s.

Count Scary was a comically stereotypical vampire. His favorite catch phrase (invariably accompanied by a "spooky" sounding musical sting) was "Oooh, that's scaary!"

Eventually, Count Scary was dropped by WDIV and moved on to WKBD's "ShocKtober" Halloween programming for several years. After "ShocKtober" was no longer able to be aired by WKBD due to the station's commitment to the then-new Fox network, the Count had a special or two on WXYZ, but these were more subdued affairs with fewer segments featuring the character than the older shows.

Count Scary's last TV appearance was a team up with the Ghoul for a 1996 Halloween special for WKBD, but Ryan continued to use the character on his WOMC radio show each Halloween, up until his dismissal by the station's new management in 2007.
