= Larry Vincent =

American television horror host

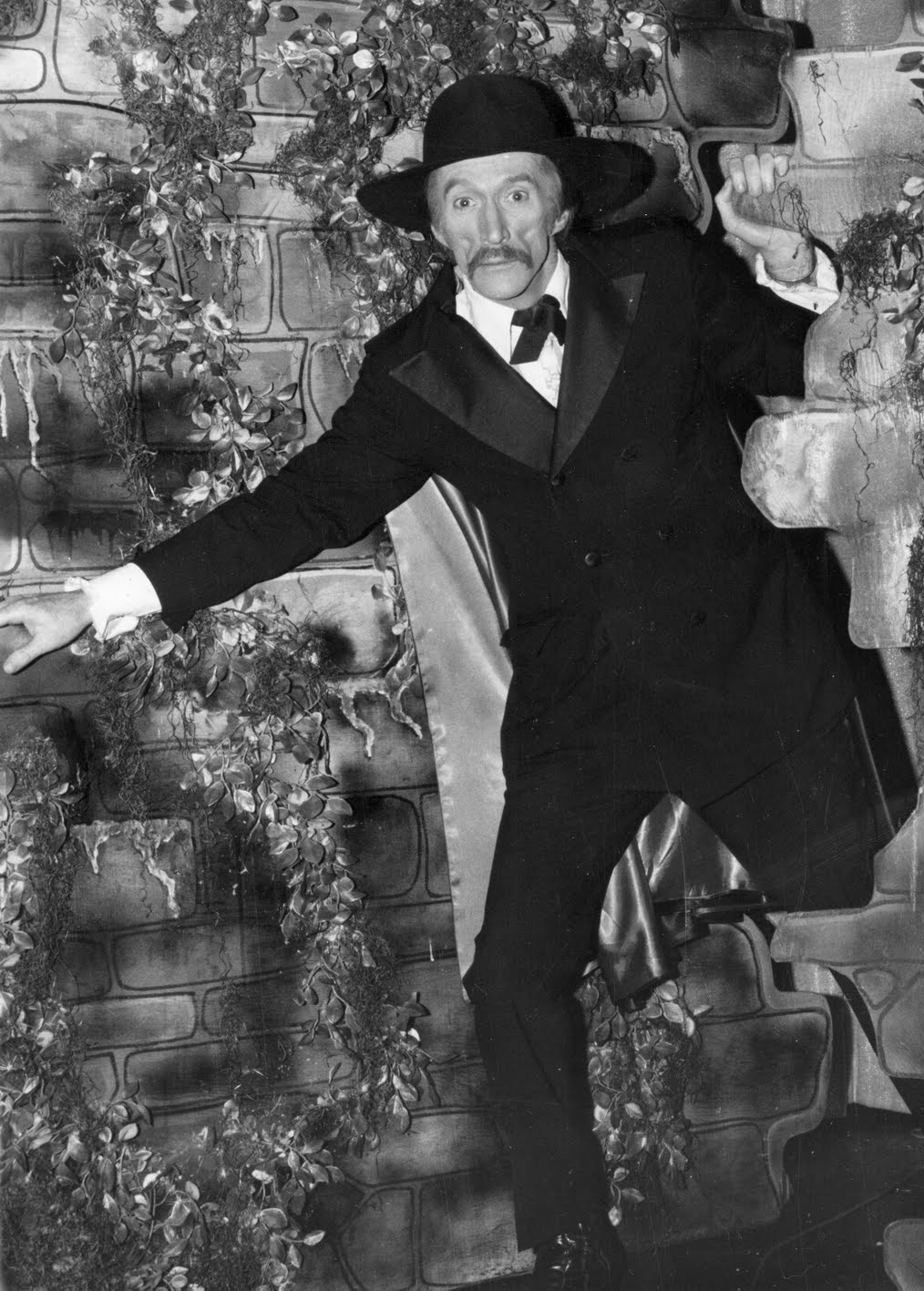
- Vincent as Seymour in 1973
- Born: Francis Fitzgerald Vincent; June 14, 1924; Massachusetts, United States
- Died: March 8, 1975 (aged 50); Burbank, California, U.S.
- Other names: Seymour, Captain Starr
- Years active: 1960-1975

Francis Fitzgerald "Larry" Vincent (June 14, 1924—March 8, 1975) was an American television horror host, famed for his character Seymour, who presented—and heckled—low-budget horror and science fiction movies on Fright Night on KHJ-TV and Seymour's Monster Rally on KTLA, both local stations in Los Angeles between 1969 and 1974. He was noted for his style of criticizing the movies he presented in an offbeat and funny manner, usually appearing in a small window which would pop up in the corner, tossing a quip, then vanishing again. Sometimes he would, using blue-screen, appear in the middle of the movie, apparently interacting with the characters in the movie.

== Early career ==
Born in Massachusetts as Francis Fitzgerald Vincent, Vincent was to star in several episodes of The New Three Stooges in 1965. He also had small roles on Get Smart, Mission: Impossible, The Flying Nun, and I Dream of Jeannie.

But before moving to Los Angeles, California, he was "Captain Starr" on WFBM in Indianapolis in the 1960s, as one of a trio of hosts, along with Harlow Hickenlooper and Curley Myers for children's programing, which showed the old Three Stooges shorts, as well as skits for an in-studio audience of children which usually ended up with pie-in-the face comedy and songs from the hosts. In 1968, he became staff director for KHJ-TV.

== Horror host ==
From 1969 to 1974 Vincent was the host for the horror shows Fright Night on KHJ-TV and Seymour's Monster Rally on KTLA.

== Later years ==
In addition to his television duties, Vincent served as Knott's Berry Farm's inaugural "Ghost Host," in 1973 at Knott's Scary Farm Halloween Haunt, and on at least one occasion, Vincent appeared at the University of California, Riverside campus for an all night sleep-in and science fiction movie festival. Shortly after his shows ended, Vincent quickly succumbed to stomach cancer and died on March 9, 1975. He left behind four daughters, Diane, Valerie, Beth, Kathryn, and one son, Daniel.

== Filmography ==
- The New Three Stooges (1965) - Captain Starr
- I Dream of Jeannie (1967) - Technician
- The Flying Nun (1967) - Ben
- Mission: Impossible (1969) - Prisoner Stoltz
- The Witchmaker (1969) - Amos Coffin
- Get Smart (1968–1969) - Farley / Jacoby
- Fright Night (1969–1973)
- Mannix (1970) - Wino
- The Incredible 2-Headed Transplant (1971) - Andrew
- Seymour's Monster Rally (1973–1974)
- Doctor Death: Seeker of Souls (1973) - The Strangler (as Larry 'Seymour' Vincent)
- Fright Night with Seymour (1974)
- The Apple Dumpling Gang (1975) - Townsman (uncredited) (final film role)
