= Sammy Terry =

American television personality

- Nightmare Theater character
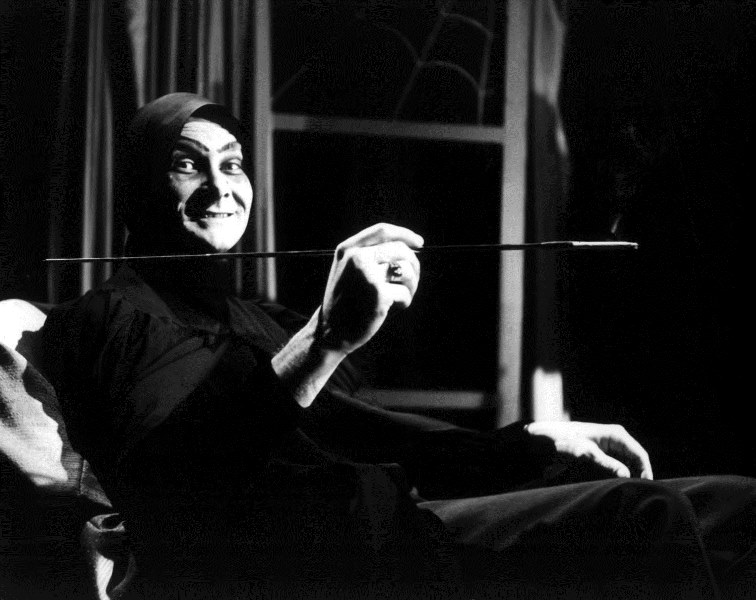
- “Sammy Terry" is a ghoul who emerged from his coffin each week beginning in 1962 to introduce horror films for local Indianapolis station WTTV-4.
- Created by: Robert Carter
- Portrayed by: Robert Carter, Mark Carter (2010 – present)

In-universe information
- Occupation: Horror host
- Family: Spider, George Butler, Ghoulsby Skull, Skully

Sammy Terry is a television horror host based in Indianapolis, Indiana. The role was originated by Robert "Bob" Carter in 1962, and Carter's son Mark Carter took over the role from his father in 2010. Bob Carter (1929–2013) was a television personality who appeared mostly on Indianapolis local television station WTTV, regularly during the 1960s and 1970s, and sporadically through the late 1980s. The format of Carter's show as Sammy Terry, Nightmare Theater, usually involved the showing of two films. During the commercial breaks, Carter, in character as Sammy Terry (a pun based on the word "cemetery"), would engage in camp banter with the audience and his floating rubber spider, "George". This banter often included some commentary on the films being shown, which included classic films as well as many less-than-stellar productions common to the horror film era of the 1930s through the early 1960s. Carter died on June 30, 2013.

== Life ==
Bob Carter was born and raised in Decatur, Illinois, and graduated from Millikin University with a major in radio communications. After receiving a master's degree from Syracuse University, Carter worked as a disc jockey at a Fort Wayne, Indiana, radio station owned by Sarkes Tarzian. While there, he filled in for Dick Clark on American Bandstand as a guest DJ on August 26, 1959. In 1961 he moved to Indianapolis, Indiana, and filled a number of positions at Tarzian's WTTV as producer, director and performer, including the hosting, for a time, of a three-hour morning talk show called Coffee with Carter.

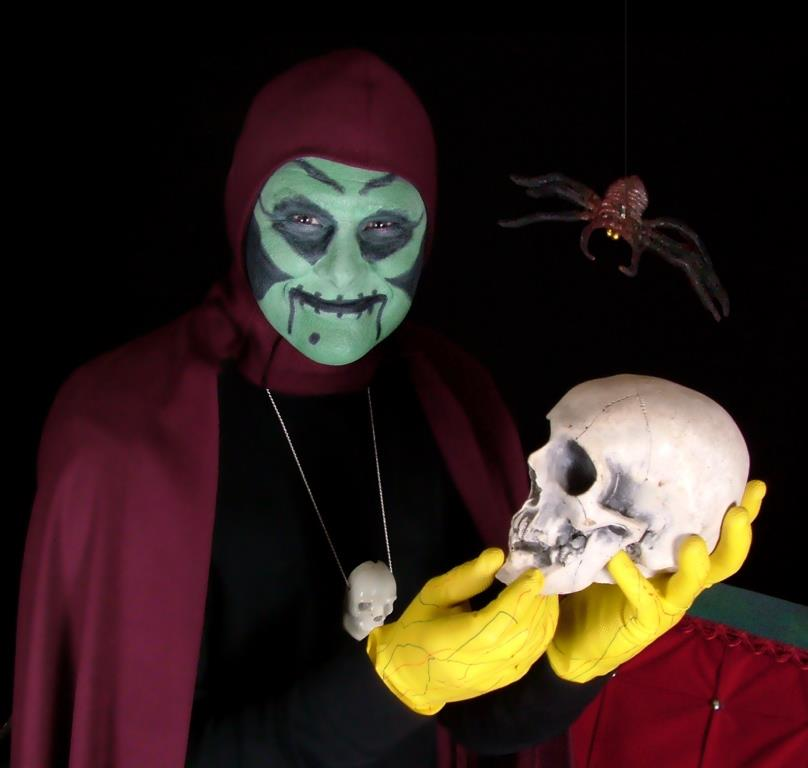
Sammy Terry's legacy continued after Robert Carter retired.

The still relatively new medium of television provided a means for classic films to generate revenue, and as part of that, Universal Studios packaged a set of more than fifty horror, suspense, and mystery films under the name Shock Theater, for sale to many television stations across the country, which usually ran the films as late-night fare. When WTTV purchased the set of films, which had been rejected by local CBS affiliate WISH-TV, Carter was chosen as the host of the new program. Carter's Shock Theater originally included only still photographs punctuated by voice-over narration during the commercial breaks. Over time, the popularity of the voice-overs with viewers and sponsors inspired Carter and his producers to develop the character of "Sammy Terry" as an on-air personality—a cloaked, pale-faced ghoul who rose from his coffin on Friday nights, laughed ominously, introduced and occasionally berated the films, and provided commercial-break entertainment. Renamed Nightmare Theater and with the banter mostly ad-libbed, the show and Carter's portrayal of "Sammy Terry" won him a large-scale following in the region, which allowed him to be ranked with other horror hosts of the era who operated out of much larger broadcast markets.

Carter's son, Mark Carter, continues to make frequent appearances as Sammy Terry and remains a popular figure in the central Indiana region.

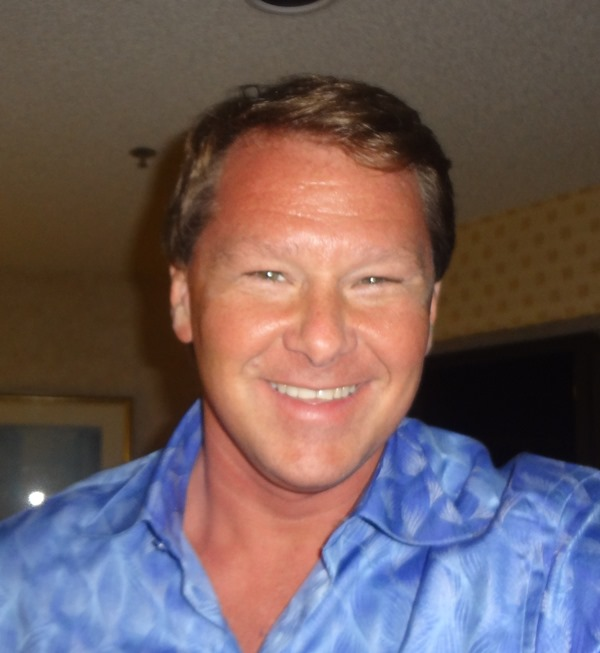
Carter's son, Mark, took over playing Sammy Terry in 2010.

Mark Carter as Sammy Terry made a return for a Halloween special that aired on October 31, 2011, on WTTV. He also returned on February 14, 2012, Valentine's Day, on WTTV for a showing of Little Shop of Horrors.

He again returned on October 31, 2012, as he hosted the two-hour special Sammy Terry Presents: The Uninvited on WTTV-4.

Sammy Terry returned to WTTV-4 on October 31, 2013, as he presented Night of the Living Dead.

On October 31, 2014, Sammy Terry hosted a double feature of the 1979 and 2005 versions of The Amityville Horror on WTTV-4.

On October 31, 2014, Sammy Terry hosted a benefit for the Historical Society in Greenfield, Indiana, with a stage show followed by a presentation of the 1950s horror classic House on Haunted Hill.

Sammy Terry returned to WTTV (on channel 4.2) for a triple feature on October 31, 2015. The featured movies were: Silence of the Lambs, Diary of the Dead, and Halloween 2.

He returned to WTTV (on channel 4.2) for a triple feature on Saturday, October 29, 2016. The featured movies were: Halloween II (2009), The Haunting In Connecticut (2009), and Night of the Living Dead: The 40th Anniversary Edition (1968).

Currently, Sammy Terry streams Nightmare Theater from Facebook at least once a week on his Sammy Terry Fan Page.
