= Vegas Vampire =

Television show host

The Vegas Vampire was a vampire of late night Shock Theater and Vegas Vampire shows at KHBV/KVVU, Channel 5, in Henderson, Nevada, and broadcast to the greater Las Vegas, Nevada area from the late 1960s through the 1970s.

The Vegas Vampire's show featured grade-“B” horror films, monster films, and science fiction films. The show was aired on Friday nights at 11 p.m. PST.

== History ==
Jim Parker, a Wisconsin-native, worked in as a disc jockey and stock car racing promoter, and as a news reporter. During a stint as a reporter for an NBC affiliate in Las Vegas he decided he wanted to do a comedy show, but the station was not interested, nor were the other network affiliate stations. Finally, he sold the show to the local Channel 5 station (KHBV/KVVU). He picked the name "Vegas Vampire" because he liked the alliteration.

The show ran on and off for nine years. Parker even claims one cancellation was due to his ending up on President Richard Nixon's enemies list after the Vampire did a routine with a Nixon voodoo doll, stuck pins in it and put the doll in a guillotine in a comparison to Marie Antoinette.

== Show format ==
The character of the Vampire appeared at the start of each show and at commercial break interruptions. Like other horror hosts, he would critique and ridicule the film being aired. One of his early trademark routines was to stick pins in voodoo dolls of politicians, civic leaders, and celebrities while needling them verbally. The character became popular enough that nationally known celebrities would sometimes appear on the show while performing in Vegas, including Red Buttons and Frank Sinatra, Jr. The Vampire would also read viewer letters on air, then burn them.

Early on the Vampire segments were performed live, but later it was a taped program, allowing it to be played multiple times during the weekend.

The host's then wife, Paula (P.J.) Parker (now P.J. Housman), played the part of "Satana" on the show in its later years.

In 1977, Variety and syndicated columnist Forrest Duke reported plans to do a road show version.

== Other appearances ==
Parker stars in a non-sexual role in full vampire get-up as Dracula in Ray Dennis Steckler's 1971 pornographic movie The Mad Love Life of a Hot Vampire. Parker's Vegas Vampire was a popular local celebrity. He traveled the streets of Las Vegas and Henderson in a trademark Hearse, and appeared at many local business openings. For many years he hosted the local segments of the Jerry Lewis MDA Telethon, and participated in local shows and charity events like the St. Jude's "Nite of Stars" show, and the Clark County Talent Guild's "Stars of Tomorrow" show. So popular was the character that at one point Parker was appointed director of publicity and public relations for TV-5. One Halloween in the 1990s the Vegas Vampire was invited to return to Vegas' Circus Circus to turn the Grand Slam Canyon (later Adventuredome) ride complex into the Dome of Doom.

== Novelty song ==
"The Vegas Vampire" is also the title of a novelty song about the character. Written and produced by Parker and Bruce Popka, the recording has been played on the Dr. Demento radio program's 1984 Halloween Show and appeared on the album Elvira: Vinyl Macabre Oldies (But Ghoulies) (Vol. 1)
