= Edwin Raub =

American television personality

- Raub as "Uncle Ted"
- Born: May 14, 1921; Kingston, Pennsylvania, U.S.
- Died: March 10, 1998 (aged 76); Kingston, Pennsylvania, U.S.
- Occupation: Magician/Actor/TV Host
- Years active: 1955–97
- Military career
- Allegiance: United States
- United States Army: 82nd Airborne Division
- Rank: Private First Class
- Unit: 505th Parachute Infantry Regiment
- Conflicts: World War II: Operation Overlord (D. Day); Operation Market Garden
- Awards: Purple Heart Medal (2)

Edwin Lynn Raub (May 14, 1921 – March 10, 1998) was a television personality and horror host under the name Uncle Ted in the Northeastern Pennsylvania viewing area of the United States. He is mostly known for hosting the programs Uncle Ted's Children's Party (Note: Some sources (Watson 1991, Times-Leader 2007) state that the name of Raub's show was "Uncle Ted's Children's Hour" instead of "Uncle Ted's Children's Party".) in the 1960s, Uncle Ted's Ghoul School from 1974 to 1982 and Uncle Ted's Monstermania from 1984 to 1997. He was posthumously inducted into the Horror Host Hall Of Fame in 2014. According to his first sidekick Richard Briggs: "He was a living legend, one of those guys who was around when (television) started up, and there's not too many of those guys around anymore."

== Early life and military service ==
Edwin L. Raub (many resources erroneously list his middle initial as "C") was born May 14, 1921, in Kingston, Pennsylvania to Samuel J. and Margaret Lynn Raub, the oldest of two sons. He was married to the former Angela Wiffen who had grown up in Wallington, Surrey, England. They had two daughters, Rita and Beth, and a son, Edwin L., Jr.

He had an uncle, named Edwin Hyde Raub, who fought during World War I, for the PA 109th Field Artillery A.E.F.; and died of pneumonia in Lyon, France.

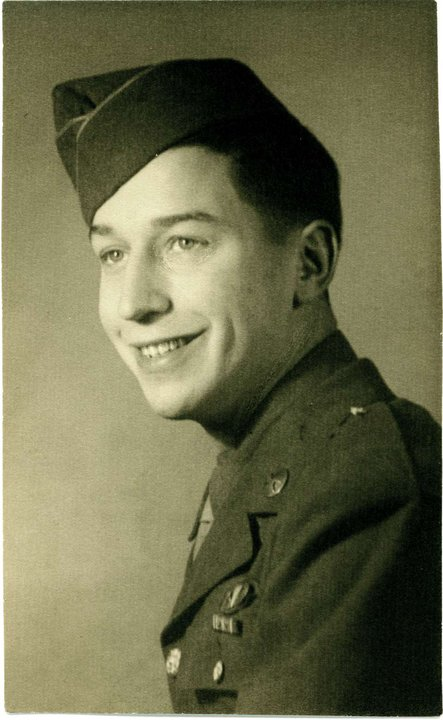
Pvt. Edwin Raub

During the Second World War, as a radio operator with the 82nd Airborne Division's 505th Parachute Infantry Regiment Raub participated in D-Day and Operation Market Garden. According to author Cornelius Ryan's best-selling account of the battle, A Bridge Too Far: "When tracer bullets began ripping through his canopy, Private Edwin Raub became so enraged that he deliberately side-slipped his chute so as to land next to the anti-aircraft gun. Without removing his harness, and dragging his parachute behind him, Raub rushed the Germans with his Tommy gun. He killed one, captured the others, and then, with plastic explosives destroyed the flak-gun barrels."

A few days later during a German artillery barrage Pvt. Raub was severely burned on both of his hands when some gasoline cans near him exploded when hit; he later received two Purple Hearts. Raub was always humble about his wartime service and tended to downplay his efforts. In 1977 he told The Scranton Times, "I was in the paratroopers because it meant an additional $50 a month in pay. When I jumped from the plane, my main concern was just to get to the ground in one piece. Sure, I saw the shells' effects, but if I had had my choice, I wouldn't have landed right in the middle of the gun emplacement!"

== Early career ==
It was during his wartime convalescence that Raub became interested in sleight-of-hand and card tricks, initially to regain the dexterity and function of his injured hands, later finding it a good way amuse himself and his fellow wounded comrades. Upon returning home he became a copywriter at local radio station WARM-FM. He also wrote dialog for commercials and would sometimes perform voice-over work. His card trick and magic hobby "just got away" and became a sideline, performing for churches and private parties then graduating to clubs, resorts, store promotions, fairs, schools, and "every mall in Northeastern Pennsylvania." His initial foray into television was in the mid-1950s at WBRE-TV as a fill-in for a leprechaun character named Mr. Nobody, later performing on the same program as "Professor Feathers," complete with homemade costume. Moving to WDAU-TV, Raub hosted his first program The Uncle Ted Show performing magic tricks for his studio audience. His first notable success came with Uncle Ted's Children's Hour. A typical local television show of the time, it was broadcast live daily with Raub as the master of ceremonies. Besides his magic act it featured such fare as puppet shows, pantomimes and birthday parties. It became a success, and "Uncle Ted" a local celebrity. Raub felt it became a success because "I never talked down to the children, I did things that interested them. Entertained them. Children like to be fooled but they are tougher to fool than grownups." Raub later tailored his school act to include a strong but entertaining anti-drug and alcohol message.

== Later career and success ==
Throughout his broadcasting career Raub continued to work on and off behind the scenes as a copywriter, salesman, producer and announcer. Magic however, remained his true love. At the height of his popularity he performed between 400 and 500 shows a year. He constructed a special trailer for his supplies dubbed the "magic wagon' and towed it from show to show with his lime-green AMC Pacer. Raub also opened a magic shop in his hometown of Kingston with fellow magician Harry Crawford. It was this act that indirectly set Raub on the path he'd become most well-known for, horror host. In 1974 Raub began starring as the host Uncle Ted's Ghoul School Friday nights on the area's largest broadcaster, WNEP-TV. The show, which was originally broadcast live, featured skits and magic interspersed throughout the film shown. It was here that Uncle Ted developed his trademark, a tuxedo, bright red fez and bushy white moustache.

During 1975 WNEP had hired a brash young reporter fresh out of college on his climb to national stardom, Bill O'Reilly. In his first book The O'Reilly Factor he relates that he had some "fierce creative differences" with the titular host. To supplement his income during his nine months at the station, O'Reilly wrote gags for Uncle Ted, who incensed him by mangling them on air because he was, according to O'Reilly, "usually half in the bag" during the telecasts. Raub's daughter, Beth Raub Bessmer strongly denies this allegation stating although her father was a recovering alcoholic he stopped drinking in June 1968. She also relates that he was a mentor and sponsor to many, when he died he was only three months shy of receiving his 30th anniversary Sobriety coin. The allegation is also denied by Tom W. who was sponsored by Raub in 1978 and remained a friend until Raub's death. O'Reilly states that he arranged to have Uncle Ted open a show by emerging from a coffin supplied as a plug for a local mortuary. After Ted entered and the lid was closed O'Reilly locked it as revenge, resulting in the show opening to a rocking closed coffin and the muffled screams of the claustrophobic host. That was O'Reilly's last day on Ghoul School although he got to host Dracula's Daughter that night after Uncle Ted stormed out of the studio. O'Reilly admits these actions were a "tad inappropriate." The show had an annual Halloween costume contest with bizarre prizes (like bringing the backstage crew's lunch) and the usual wacky skits. In one particular skit Uncle Ted anticipated the film Honey, I Shrunk the Kids by shrinking his crew with an inability to reverse the process. Monstermania's former director Jim Langan summed up Uncle Ted's appeal; "When you saw him, you felt like you were meeting with a friend. People like Johnny Carson and Uncle Ted made you feel like you were visiting with them rather than watching them on television. He was just so good at reaching through the screen and touching his audience." In 1994, Raub was recognized by both the Society of American Magicians and Scary Monsters Magazine as one of the nation's "longest-running horror hosts."

== Death ==
A long-time smoker of filter-less Camel cigarettes who suffered ill-health from his addiction, Raub made anti-smoking messages part of his work, especially with children. He also made a few anti-smoking public service commercials. After a struggle with emphysema, Raub died March 10, 1998. He was interred at Memorial Shrine Cemetery in Franklin Township, PA. Uncle Ted was inducted posthumously into the Horror Host Hall of Fame on March 22, 2014.
