= Ray Sparenberg =

American movie host

Ray Sparenberg was a host of early horror movies from 1958 to 1963 as a character called Selwin, on WISH-TV in Indianapolis, Indiana.

One of the earliest hosts of the new rash of B-movies flooding the U.S. in the 1950s and 60s, Sparenberg later hosted different film themes as other characters such as an astronaut and safari hunter at WISH-TV.
