= Creature Feature (1973 TV series) =

Television series

Creature Feature, presented in later years as Dr. Paul Bearer Presents, was a TV horror movie series on WTOG in St. Petersburg, Florida, from 1973 to 1995. The films were hosted by Dick Bennick Sr. Bennick was born on 3 November 1928 in Asheville, North Carolina. He was an actor and director, known for Creature Feature, Shock Theatre and Fright Theatre. He died on 15 February 1995 in Winter Haven, Florida. As Dr. Paul Bearer, he hosted a different classic horror film every Saturday afternoon at 2 pm. Bennick created the character at WGHP in High Point, North Carolina, for the station's Shock Theater in the mid-to-late 1960s after his previous persona, Count Shockula, proved less than satisfactory.

The humorous Bearer character was a pun-spewing, bad-joke-telling host who spoke in a gravelly voice with a halting speech pattern. His usual attire was a long-tailed vintage tuxedo with his hair parted down the middle and slicked straight on the sides, with heavy mascara and greasepaint. His skewed gaze, which Bennick perfected by turning his one artificial eye outward, only contributed to the atmosphere. He also twisted around some words and names to reflect the horror atmosphere. He frequently called the horror films "horrible old movies", and the city that WTOG's studios were based in "St. Creaturesburg". Occasionally, he was accompanied onset with his co-host, a prop spider by the name of Spinjamin Bock (a play on the name Benjamin Spock, voiced by Bennick).

One typical joke started with a close up of a hammer in Paul's hand. He strikes a package of Wrigley's Spearmint gum several times with the hammer, then looks up at the camera and says "I'm just sitting here, beating my gums". Bearer also aired occasional novelty songs, such as Tom Lehrer's "Poisoning Pigeons in the Park", to which he would often lip-sync while pretending to accompany himself on a matte-black-painted baby grand piano.

He also participated in the city's annual Gasparilla Pirate Festival, riding in or on top of a vintage Cadillac hearse as part of the station's promotion.

His trademark signoff was "I'll be lurking for you".

The series ended in 1995 following the death of Bennick, after his open-heart surgery.

He gained a measure of national notoriety as the longest-running horror host on television, and in 1993, then-Tampa mayor Sandy Freedman declared October 30 "Dr. Paul Bearer Day".

In 2015, WTOG brought Dr. Paul Bearer back to host a new film series, Tombstone Tales. The new Dr. Paul Bearer is a clone of the original, played by Richard Koon. The new Dr. Paul Bearer picks up where his predecessor left off with bad puns and skewed product endorsements. Tombstone Tales has been met with an indifferent reception since WTOG aired current movies in their library that do not fit in the horror genre, and were contrary to the "horrible old movies" the original Creature Feature was known for. Koon's take on Dr. Paul Bearer, however, became very popular. Dr. Paul and his 1994 Lincoln hearse are the main attraction at festivals and parades. He was the grand marshal for the 2016 Guavaween parade in Tampa.
