= American Scary =

2006 American documentary film

- Theatrical release poster
- Directed by: John E. Hudgens
- Written by: Sandy Clark; John E. Hudgens
- Produced by: Sandy Clark
- Starring: John Zacherle; Maila Nurmi; Ernie Anderson
- Distributed by: Cinema Libre Studio
- Release date: October 2006 (Hollywood Film Festival)
- Running time: 92 minutes
- Country: United States
- Language: English

American Scary is a 2006 American documentary film about the history and legacy of classic television horror hosts, written and directed by American independent filmmakers John E. Hudgens and Sandy Clark.

== Background ==
The film features nearly 60 horror hosts, including interviews with and vintage clips of many of the genre's stars, such as Washington, DC's Count Gore De Vol, New York City's Zacherley, Los Angeles' Vampira, Cleveland's Ghoulardi, and Chicago's Svengoolie, among others. Non-host celebrities such as Neil Gaiman, Tim Conway, Forrest J Ackerman, Tom Savini, Leonard Maltin, Joel Hodgson, and Bob Burns appear to reminisce about the influence of horror hosts on their careers and/or lives, as well as many modern hosts who keep the tradition alive in modern shows on public-access television cable TV or the internet.

== Release ==
The film premiered in October 2006 at the Hollywood Film Festival, and was released on DVD in February 2009. In April 2010, it won the award for Best Independent Production of 2009 at the 8th Annual Rondo Hatton Classic Horror Awards.

== See also ==
- Virginia Creepers
- Mystery Science Theater 3000
- MeTV
