= List of horror films of the 1950s =

This is a list of horror films released in the 1950s. At the beginning of the 1950s, horror films were described by Kim Newman as being "out of fashion". Among the most influential horror films of the 1950s was The Thing From Another World, with Newman stating that countless science fiction horror films of the 1950s would follow in its style, while a film made just the year before, The Man from Planet X was still in debt to the Universal horror style of filming, with a bearded scientist and foggy sets. For five years following the release of The Thing From Another World, nearly every film involving aliens, dinosaurs or radioactive mutants would be dealt with matter-of-fact characters as seen in The Thing From Another World. Even films that adapted older characters had science fiction leanings, such as The Vampire, The Werewolf and Frankenstein 1970 being influenced by the atomic-inspired monsters of the era. Films with a Strange Case of Dr Jekyll and Mr Hyde theme also appeared with The Neanderthal Man, The Fly, Monster on the Campus and Hideous Sun Demon.

While studies suggest that gothic horror had fallen out of fashion between the release of House of Dracula and The Curse of Frankenstein, small glimpses of the genre appeared in films such as The Son of Dr. Jekyll, The Strange Door, The Black Castle and House of Wax. Several of these films were also shot in 3D such as The Mad Magician, Phantom of the Rue Morgue, and The Maze. Universal-International produced the film ''Cult of the Cobra which created a short lived wave of horror films featuring Pin-up model like mutants such as The Leech Woman and The Wasp Woman. Prior to the release of Hammer Film Productions's gothic films, the last gothic horror films of the 1950s often featured aged stars like Bela Lugosi, Lon Chaney Jr., and Boris Karloff in films made by low budget indie film directors like Ed Wood or Reginald LeBorg or producers like Howard W. Koch. Hammer originally began developing American-styled science fiction films in the early 1950s but later branched into horror with their colour films The Curse of Frankenstein and Dracula. These films would birth two horror film stars: Christopher Lee and Peter Cushing. Along with Hammer's more science fiction oriented series Quatermass, both the gothic and science fiction films of Hammer would develop many similar films within the years.

Horror films aimed a young audience featuring teenage monsters grew popular in the 1950s with several productions from American International Pictures (AIP) and productions of Herman Cohen with I Was a Teenage Werewolf and I Was a Teenage Frankenstein. This led to later productions like Daughter of Dr. Jekyll and Frankenstein's Daughter. Director William Castle also attracted horror audiences with his gimmick-themed horror films such as The Tingler and House on Haunted Hill. Horror films also expanded further into international productions in the 1950s such as Mexican production El vampiro. In Italy, Riccardo Freda and Mario Bava developed early Italian horror films with I Vampiri and Caltiki – The Immortal Monster. Productions also extended into the Philippines (Terror Is a Man), Germany (The Head and Horrors of Spider Island) and France (Eyes Without a Face).

== List ==
Horror films released in the 1950s
Title	Director	Cast	Country	Notes
1950
The Fall of the House of Usher	Ivan Barnett	Gwen Watford, Kaye Tendeter, Irving Steen, Vernon Charles	United Kingdom	
Kamay ni Satanas	Gerardo de Leon	Leila Morena, Reynaldo Dante, Nena Cardenas, Fred Santos	Philippines	
1951
Abbott and Costello Meet the Invisible Man	Charles Lamont	Bud Abbott, Lou Costello	United States	
Bluebeard	Christian-Jaque	Cécile Aubry, Pierre Brasseur	France; Switzerland; West Germany	
Bride of the Gorilla	Curt Siodmak	Barbara Payton, Lon Chaney Jr., Raymond Burr	United States	
Claws of Iron	Nobuo Adachi	Joji Oka, Sumiko Odaka, Ryosuke Kagawa	Japan	
Five	Arch Oboler	William Phipps, Susan Douglas Rubeš, James Anderson, Charles Lampkin, Earl Lee	United States	
The Man from Planet X	Edgar G. Ulmer	Robert Clarke, Margaret Field, Raymond Bond, William Schallert	United States	
Satur	Lamberto V. Avellana	Manuel Conde, Delia Razon, Jaime de la Rosa	Philippines	
The Son of Dr. Jekyll	Seymour Friedman	Louis Hayward, Jody Lawrance, Alexander Knox	United States	
The Strange Door	Joseph Pevney	Charles Laughton, Boris Karloff, Sally Forrest	United States	
The Thing from Another World	Christian Nyby	James Arness, Margaret Sheridan, Kenneth Tobey	United States	
1952
Alraune	Arthur Maria Rabenalt	Hildegard Knef, Erich von Stroheim, Karlheinz Böhm	West Germany	
The Black Castle	Nathan H. Juran	Richard Greene, Boris Karloff, Lon Chaney Jr.	United States	
Ghost Ship	Vernon Sewell	Dermot Walsh, Hazel Court, Hugh Burden	United Kingdom	
Ghost Story: Passion in Fukagawa	Minoru Inuzuka	Mitsuko Mito, Yûji Hori	Japan	
Mother Riley Meets the Vampire	John Gilling	Arthur Lucan, Bela Lugosi, Dora Bryan	United Kingdom	
Sandino	Eduardo de Castro	Danilo Montes, Buenaobram Ester, Patria Plata, Rafael Jimenez	Philippines	
Taong Paniki	Richard Abelardo	Jaime de la Rosa, Delia Razon	Philippines	
1953
Abbott and Costello Meet Dr. Jekyll and Mr. Hyde	Charles Lamont	Bud Abbott, Lou Costello, Boris Karloff	United States	
The Beast from 20,000 Fathoms	Eugène Lourié	Paul Christian, Paula Raymond, Cecil Kellaway	United States	Science fiction horror
Donovan's Brain	Felix E. Feist	Lew Ayres, Gene Evans, Nancy Davis, Steve Brodie	United States	
Ghost-Cat of Arima Palace	Ryohei Arai	Takako Irie, Kotaro Bando	Japan	
Ghost of Saga Mansion	Ryohei Arai	Takako Irie, Kôtarô Bandô	Japan	
House of Wax	André De Toth	Vincent Price, Frank Lovejoy, Phyllis Kirk	United States	
Invaders from Mars	William Cameron Menzies	Helena Carter, Arthur Franz, Jimmy Hunt	United States	
The Knight of the Night	Robert Darène	Renée Saint-Cyr, Jean-Claude Pascal	France	
The Magnetic Monster	Curt Siodmak	Richard Carlson, King Donovan, Jean Byron, Harry Ellerbe, Leo Britt, Leonard Mudie, Byron Foulger	United States	
Man in the Attic	Hugo Fregonese	Jack Palance, Constance Smith, Byron Palmer	United States	
The Maze	William Cameron Menzies	Richard Carlson, Veronica Hurst, Katherine Emery	United States	
The Neanderthal Man	Ewald André Dupont	Robert Shayne, Doris Merrick, Richard Crane	United States	
Phantom from Space	W. Lee Wilder	Ted Cooper, Tom Daly, Steve Acton	United States	
Scared Stiff	George Marshall	Dean Martin, Jerry Lewis	United States	
White Witch Doctor	Henry Hathaway	Susan Hayward, Robert Mitchum	United States	
1954
Creature from the Black Lagoon	Jack Arnold	Richard Carlson, Julie Adams, Richard Denning	United States	Science fiction horror
The Ghost Cat of Ouma Crossing	Bin Katô	Michiyo Ai, Kôtarô Bandô, Takako Irie, Ryôsuke Kagawa, Shintarô Katsu	Japan	
Ghost Man	Motoyoshi Oda	Seizaburō Kawazu, Haruo Tanaka, Joji Oka, Gen Shimizu	Japan	
Godzilla	Ishirō Honda	Akira Takarada, Akihiko Hirata, Takashi Shimura	Japan	
Gog	Herbert L. Strock	Richard Egan, Constance Dowling, Herbert Marshall	United States	
The Golden Mistress	Abner Biberman	John Agar, Rosemarie Bowe	United States	
Gorilla at Large	Harmon Jones	Cameron Mitchell, Anne Bancroft, Lee J. Cobb, Raymond Burr	United States	
Hiwaga sa Balete Drive	Tor Villano	Oscar Moreno, Rosita Noble	Philippines	
Inugami-ke no nazo: Akuma wa odoru	Kunio Watanabe	Chiezô Kataoka, Kazuo Ishii, Chizuru Kitagawa	Japan	
Killers from Space	W. Lee Wilder	Peter Graves, James Seay, Steve Pendleton, Frank Gerstle, John Frederick, Barbara Bestar	United States	
La Bruja	Chano Urueta	Lilia del Valle, Ramón Gay	Mexico	
The Mad Magician	John Brahm	Vincent Price, Mary Murphy, Eva Gabor	United States	
The Snow Creature	W. Lee Wilder	Paul Langton, Leslie Denison, Teru Shimada	United States	
Phantom of the Rue Morgue	Roy Del Ruth	Karl Malden, Claude Dauphin, Patricia Medina	United States	
Terrible Ghost Cat of Okazaki	Bin Katô	Takako Irie, Yoshitaro Sadato, Michiko Ai, Shôsaku Sugiyama	Japan	
Them!	Gordon Douglas	James Whitmore, Edmund Gwenn, Joan Weldon, James Arness	United States	Science fiction horror
1955
Abbott and Costello Meet the Mummy	Charles Lamont	Bud Abbott, Lou Costello, Marie Windsor	United States	Horror comedy
Bride of the Monster	Ed Wood	Bela Lugosi, Tor Johnson, Tony McCoy	United States	
Creature with the Atom Brain	Edward L. Cahn	Richard Denning, Angela Stevens, S. John Launer	United States	Science fiction horror
Cult of the Cobra	Francis D. Lyon	Faith Domergue, Richard Long, Marshall Thompson, Jack Kelly, Kathleen Hughes, David Janssen, Edward Platt, Myrna Hansen	United States	
Dementia	John Parker	Adrienne Barrett, Bruno VeSota, Ben Roseman, Richard Barron	United States	
It Came from Beneath the Sea	Robert Gordon	Kenneth Tobey, Faith Domergue, Donald Curtis	United States	Science fiction horror
Les Diaboliques	Henri-Georges Clouzot	Simone Signoret, Véra Clouzot, Paul Meurisse, Charles Vanel	France	
Night of the Hunter	Charles Laughton	Robert Mitchum, Shelley Winters	United States	
1956
Earth vs. the Flying Saucers	Fred F. Sears	Hugh Marlowe, Joan Taylor	United States	
Invasion of the Body Snatchers	Don Siegel	Kevin McCarthy, Dana Wynter, Larry Gates	United States	Science fiction horror
The Black Sleep	Reginald LeBorg	Basil Rathbone, Akim Tamiroff, Lon Chaney Jr., Bela Lugosi, John Carradine, Tor Johnson	United States	
The Blonde Witch	André Michel	Marina Vlady, Nicole Courcel, Maurice Ronet	France; Sweden	
Francis in the Haunted House	Charles Lamont	Mickey Rooney, Virginia Welles, James Flavin, Paul Cavanagh, Mary Ellen Kay, David Janssen	United States	
The Gamma People	John Gilling	Paul Douglas, Eva Bartok	United Kingdom	
The Hunchback of Notre Dame	Jean Delannoy	Gina Lollobrigida, Anthony Quinn	France; Italy	
Man Beast	Jerry Warren	Rock Madison, Asa Maynor, George Skaff	United States	
The Mole People	Virgil Vogel	John Agar, Cynthia Patrick, Hugh Beaumont	United States	Science fiction horror
The She-Creature	Edward L. Cahn	Chester Morris, Marla English, Tom Conway	United States	
The Werewolf	Fred F. Sears	Don Megowan, Joyce Holden	United States	
1957
20 Million Miles to Earth	Nathan Juran	William Hopper, Joan Taylor, Frank Puglia	United States	
The Abominable Snowman	Val Guest	Forrest Tucker, Peter Cushing, Maureen Connell	United Kingdom	
Attack of the Crab Monsters	Roger Corman	Richard Garland, Pamela Duncan, Russell Johnson	United States	
Back from the Dead	Charles Marquis Warren	Peggie Castle, Arthur Franz, Marsha Hunt	United States	
The Black Scorpion	Edward Ludwig	Richard Denning, Mara Corday, Carlos Rivas	United States	
Blood of Dracula	Herbert L. Strock	Sandra Harrison, Gail Ganley, Jerry Blaine	United States	
The Body Snatcher (aka Ladrón de cadáveres)	Fernando Mendez	Columba Domínguez, Crox Alvarado, Wolf Ruvinskis, Carlos Riquelme	Mexico	
Cat Girl	Alfred Shaughnessy	Barbara Shelley, Robert Ayres, Kay Callard	United Kingdom	
The Curse of Frankenstein	Terence Fisher	Peter Cushing, Christopher Lee, Hazel Court	United Kingdom	
Daughter of Dr. Jekyll	Edgar G. Ulmer	John Agar, Gloria Talbott, Arthur Shields	United States	
The Disembodied	Walter Grauman	Paul Burke, Allison Hayes, John Wengraf	United States	
From Hell It Came	Dan Milner	Tina Carver, Baynes Barron, Suzanne Ridgeway	United States	
The Giant Claw	Fred F. Sears	Jeff Morrow, Mara Corday	United States	
Godzilla, King of the Monsters!	Ishirô Honda	Raymond Burr, Toyoaki Suzuki, Frank Iwanaga, Akira Takarada, Akihiko Hirata, Sachio Sakai, Takashi Shimura, Momoko Kôchi	Japan; United States; France	
The Incredible Shrinking Man	Jack Arnold	Grant Williams, Randy Stuart	United States	
La Maldicion de la Momia Azteca (aka Curse of the Aztec Mummy)	Rafael Lopez Portillo	Julian DeMeriche, Alejandro Cruz, Arturo Martinez Sr.	Mexico	
Kronos	Kurt Neumann	Jeff Morrow, Barbara Lawrence, John Emery	United States	
La Momia Azteca (aka The Aztec Mummy)	Rafael Lopez Portillo	Emma Roldan, Jorge Mondragon, Arturo Martinez Sr.	Mexico	
The Man Who Turned to Stone	László Kardos	Victor Jory, Ann Doran, Charlotte Austin	United States	
The Monster That Challenged the World	Arnold Laven	Tim Holt, Audrey Dalton, Mimi Gibson	United States	Science fiction
Night of the Demon	Jacques Tourneur	Dana Andrews, Peggy Cummins, Niall MacGinnis	United Kingdom	
Pharaoh's Curse	Lee Sholem	Mark Dana, Ziva Rodann	United States	
Plan 9 from Outer Space	Ed Wood	Bela Lugosi, Tor Johnson, Maila Nurmi	United States	Shot in 1956, released in 1957; Science fiction horror
The Robot vs the Aztec Mummy	Rafael Lopez Portillo	Emma Roldan, Jorge Mondragon, Arturo Martinez Sr.	Mexico	
She Devil	Kurt Neumann	Mari Blanchard, Jack Kelly, Albert Dekker	United States	
Spook Chasers	George Blair	Huntz Hall, Robert Shayne	United States	Horror comedy
The Undead	Roger Corman	Pamela Duncan, Richard Garland, Allison Hayes, Val Dufour	United States	
The Unknown Terror	Charles Marquis Warren	John Howard, Mala Powers, Paul Richards, May Wynn	United States	
The Vampire	Paul Landres	John Beal, Kenneth Tobey, Dabbs Greer	United States	
I Vampiri (aka The Devil's Commandment)	Riccardo Freda, Mario Bava, Riccardo Freda	Gianna Maria Canale, Carlo D'Angelo, Dario Michaelis	Italy	
Voodoo Island	Reginald LeBorg	Boris Karloff, Beverly Tyler, Murvyn Vye	United States	
Voodoo Woman	Edward L. Cahn	Marla English, Tom Conway, Lance Fuller	United States	
Zombies of Mora Tau	Edward L. Cahn	Gregg Palmer, Allison Hayes, Autumn Russell	United States	
1958
Attack of the 50 Foot Woman	Nathan Juran	Allison Hayes, William Hudson, Yvette Vickers	United States	
The Blob	Irvin Yeaworth	Steve McQueen, Aneta Corsaut, Earl Rowe	United States	Science fiction horror
Blood of the Vampire	Henry Cass	Donald Wolfit, Vincent Ball, Barbara Shelley	United Kingdom	
Black Cat Mansion	Nobuo Nakagawa	Toshio Hosokawa, Yuriko Ejima, Takashi Wada	Japan	
The Brain Eaters	Bruno Ve Sota	Ed Nelson, Alan Frost, Jack Hill	United States	
The Bride and the Beast	Adrian Weiss	Charlotte Austin, Lance Fuller, Johnny Roth	United States	
The Castle of the Monsters	Julián Soler	Antonio Espino, Evangelina Elizondo	Mexico	
The Colossus of New York	Eugène Lourié	Ross Martin, Otto Kruger, John Baragrey, Mala Powers, Charles Herbert	United States	
Corridors of Blood	Robert Day	Boris Karloff, Christopher Lee	United Kingdom	
The Crawling Eye (aka The Trollenberg Terror)	Quentin Lawrence	Forrest Tucker, Laurence Payne, Jennifer Jayne	United Kingdom	
Curse of the Faceless Man	Edward L. Cahn	Richard Anderson, Elaine Edwards, Adele Mara	United States	
The Fly	Kurt Neumann	Al Hedison, Patricia Owens, Vincent Price	United States	Science fiction horror
Frankenstein 1970	Howard W. Koch	Boris Karloff, Tom Duggan, Jana Lund, Donald Barry, Charlotte Austin	United States	
Giant from the Unknown	Richard E. Cunha	Ed Kemmer, Sally Fraser, Buddy Baer	United States	
The Haunted Strangler (aka Grip of the Strangler)	Robert Day	Boris Karloff, Jean Kent	United Kingdom	
The Hideous Sun Demon	Tom Boutross, Robert Clarke	Robert Clarke, Patricia Manning, Nan Peterson	United States	Science fiction horror
El hombre y el monstruo (The Man and the Monster)	Rafael Baledon	Abel Salazar	Mexico	
The Horror of Dracula	Terence Fisher	Peter Cushing, Christopher Lee, Melissa Stribling	United Kingdom	
I Bury the Living	Albert Band	Richard Boone, Theodore Bikel, Peggy Maurer	United States	
I Married a Monster from Outer Space	Gene Fowler Jr.	Tom Tryon, Gloria Talbott	United States	
It! The Terror from Beyond Space	Edward L. Cahn	Marshall Thompson, Shirley Patterson, Kim Spaldin	United States	
Macabre	William Castle	Jacqueline Scott, Jim Backus, Philip Tonge	United States	
Monster on the Campus	Jack Arnold	Joanna Moore, Troy Donahue, Nancy Walters	United States	
Pusang Itim	Cirio H. Santiago	Johnny Monteiro, Cynthia Zamora, Lauro Delgado, Carol Varga	Philippines	
The Return of Dracula	Paul Landres	Francis Lederer	United States	
The Revenge of Frankenstein	Terence Fisher	Peter Cushing, Francis Matthews, Eunice Gayson, Michael Gwynn	United Kingdom	
The Snorkel	Guy Green	Peter van Eyck, Betta St. John, Mandy Miller	United Kingdom	
The Screaming Skull	Alex Nicol	John Hudson, Peggy Webber, Toni Johnson	United States	
The Space Children	Jack Arnold	Michel de Carvalho, Adam Williams, Peggy Webber	United States	
Space Master X-7	Edward Bernds	Bill Williams, Lyn Thomas, Robert Ellis	United States	
Terror in the Haunted House (aka My World Dies Screaming)	Harold Daniels	Gerald Mohr, Cathy O'Donnell, William Ching	United States	
The Thing That Couldn't Die	Will Cowan	William Reynolds, Andra Martin, Jeffrey Stone	United States	
The Vampire's Coffin	Fernando Mendez	Abel Salazar	Mexico	
The Woman Eater	Charles Saunders	George Coulouris, Vera Day	United Kingdom	
1959
The Alligator People	Roy Del Ruth	Beverly Garland, Bruce Bennett, Lon Chaney Jr., George Macready	United States	
Attack of the Giant Leeches	Bernard Kowalski	Jan Shepard, Gene Roth, Yvette Vickers	United States	
Beast from Haunted Cave	Monte Hellman	Michael Forest, Frank Wolff, Chris Robinson	United States	
A Bucket of Blood	Roger Corman	Dick Miller, Barboura Morris, Anthony Carbone	United States	
Caltiki – The Immortal Monster	Riccardo Freda, Mario Bava	John Merivale, Didi Perego, Gérard Herter	Italy; France	
Curse of the Undead	Edward Dein	Eric Fleming, Michael Pate, Kathleen Crowley	United States	
Doctor Without Scruples	Falk Harnack	Ewald Balser, Barbara Rütting, Wolfgang Preiss	West Germany	
The Four Skulls of Jonathan Drake	Edward L. Cahn	Eduard Franz, Valerie French, Henry Daniell	United States	
Ghost of Dragstrip Hollow	William J. Hole Jr.	Jody Fair, Martin Braddock, Russ Bender	United States	
Tokaido Yotsuya kaidan (aka The Ghost of Yotsuya)	Nobuo Nakagawa	Shigeru Amachi, Noriko Kitazawa	Japan	
The Giant Gila Monster	Ray Kellogg	Don Sullivan, Fred Graham	United States	
The Head	Victor Trivas	Horst Frank, Michel Simon, Paul Dahlke	West Germany	
The Hound of the Baskervilles	Terence Fisher	Peter Cushing, André Morell, Christopher Lee	United Kingdom	
House of Terror	Gilberto Martínez Solares	Lon Chaney Jr., Tin-Tan, Yolanda Varela	Mexico	
House on Haunted Hill	William Castle	Vincent Price, Carol Ohmart, Richard Long	United States	
Jack the Ripper	Monty Berman, Robert S. Baker	Eddie Byrne, Lee Patterson	United Kingdom	
La Llorona (a.k.a. The Crying Woman)	René Cardona, Sr.	María Elena Marqués	Mexico	
The Man Who Could Cheat Death	Terence Fisher	Anton Diffring, Hazel Court, Christopher Lee	United Kingdom; United States	
The Mummy	Terence Fisher	Peter Cushing, Christopher Lee, Yvonne Furneaux	United Kingdom	
Return of the Fly	Edward Bernds	Vincent Price, Brett Halsey	United States	
The Stranglers of Bombay	Terence Fisher	Guy Rolfe, Allan Cuthbertson, Andrew Cruickshank	United Kingdom	
Teenagers from Outer Space	Tom Graeff	David Love, Dawn Bender, Bryan Grant	United States	Science fiction horror
Terror Is a Man	Gerardo de León	Francis Lederer, Greta Thyssen, Richard Derr	Philippines; United States	
The Tingler	William Castle	Vincent Price, Judith Evelyn, Darryl Hickman	United States	Science fiction horror
Uncle Was a Vampire (aka Hard Times for Vampires)	Steno	Sylva Koscina, Christopher Lee	Italy	

== See also ==
- Lists of horror films
