= Kaibyō =

Supernatural cats in Japanese folklore

Kaibyō (怪猫, "strange cat") are supernatural cats in Japanese folklore. Examples include bakeneko, a yōkai (or supernatural entity) commonly characterized as having the ability to shapeshift into human form; maneki-neko, usually depicted as a figurine often believed to bring good luck to the owner; and nekomata, referring either to a type of yōkai that lives in mountain areas or domestic cats that have grown old and transformed into yōkai.

The reason that cats are often depicted as yōkai in Japanese mythology can be attributed to many of their characteristics: for example, the irises of their eyes change shape depending on the time of day; their fur can seem to cause sparks when they are petted (due to static electricity); they sometimes lick blood; they can walk without making audible sounds; their sharp claws and teeth; their nocturnal habits; and their speed and agility.

== Types ==
=== Bakeneko ===
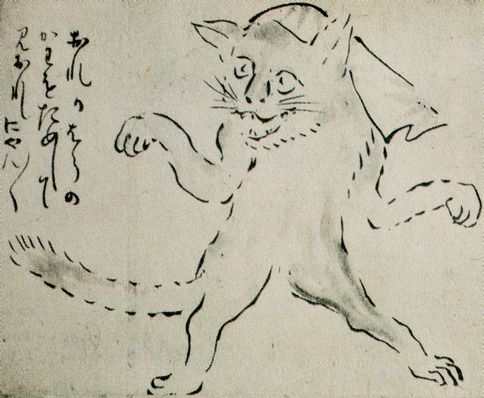
"The Bakeneko of the Sasakibara Family" (榊原家の化け猫), from the Buson yōkai emaki by Yosa Buson (18th century).

The bakeneko (化け猫, "changed cat") is a yōkai that appears in legends in various parts of Japan. Its characteristics and abilities vary, from being able to shapeshift into human form, speak human words, curse or possess humans, and manipulate dead people, to wearing a towel or napkin on its head and dancing.

=== Maneki-neko ===
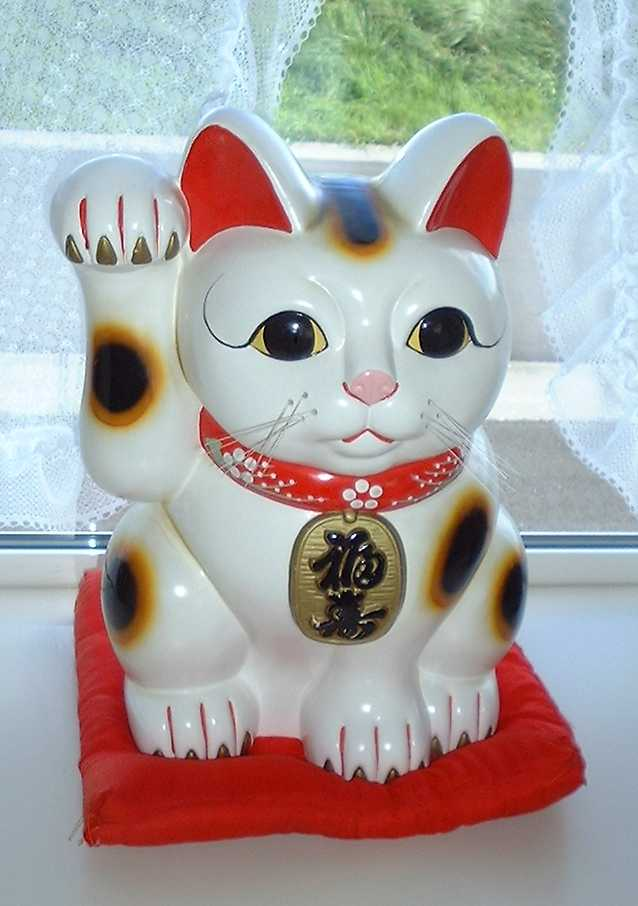
A maneki-neko figure

The maneki-neko (招き猫, lit. 'beckoning cat'), or "lucky cat", is commonly depicted as a figurine, often believed to bring good luck to the owner. It is typically depicted as a calico Japanese Bobtail holding a koban coin, with a paw raised in a Japanese beckoning gesture. The figurines are often displayed in shops, restaurants, pachinko parlors, laundromats, bars, casinos, hotels, nightclubs, and other businesses, generally near the entrance.

=== Nekomata ===
Nekomata (original form: 猫また, later forms: 猫又, 猫股, 猫胯) refers either to a type of cat yōkai that lives in mountain areas, or to domestic cats that have grown old and transformed into yōkai.

== In film ==
"Monster cat" or "ghost cat" films (kaibyō eiga or bake neko mono) are a subgenre of Japanese horror films featuring kaibyō, derived primarily from the repertoire of kabuki theatre. The subgenre first gained popularity prior to World War II; its popularity declined after the war, arguably because Japanese audiences no longer believed in or feared such entities. However, the subgenre experienced a resurgence of popularity in the 1950s and 1960s due to actress Takako Irie appearing in "monster cat" film roles. Films featuring depictions of kaibyō include:

- Arima Neko (1937)
- The Ghost Cat and the Mysterious Shamisen (1938)
- Ghost Cat of Nabeshima (1949)
- Ghost of Saga Mansion (1953)
- Ghost-Cat of Arima Palace (1953)
- Ghost Cat of the Okazaki Upheaval (1954)
- The Ghost Cat of Ouma Crossing (1954)
- Ghost-Cat of Gojusan-Tsugi (1956)
- Ghost Cat of Yonaki Swamp (1957)
- Ghost-Cat Wall of Hatred (1958)
- Black Cat Mansion (1958)
- The Ghost Cat of Otama Pond (1960)
- Kuroneko (1968)
- The Ghost-Cat Cursed Pond (1968)
- Blind Woman's Curse (1970)
- A Haunted Turkish Bathhouse (1975)
- House (1977)
