= Tokyo March =

1929 Japanese film

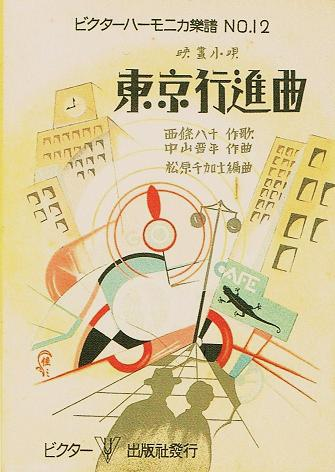
- Cover of sheet music for the theme song
- Directed by: Kenji Mizoguchi
- Written by: Chiio Kimura (screenplay); Hiroshi Kikuchi (novel)
- Starring: Shizue Natsukawa; Reiji Ichiki; Isamu Kosugi; Eiji Takagi; Takako Irie
- Cinematography: Tatsuyuki Yokota
- Production company: Nikkatsu
- Release date: 31 May 1929 (Japan)
- Running time: 2,777 meters
- Country: Japan
- Language: Japanese

Tokyo March (東京行進曲, Tōkyō kōshinkyoku) is a 1929 Japanese silent drama film directed by Kenji Mizoguchi. It is one of the left-leaning "tendency films" Mizoguchi made in the late 1920s. Only a fragment of the film exists today.

== Plot ==
Michiyo, an orphan and factory working girl, lives with her labourer uncle and his wife in Tokyo. When he loses his job, they decide to sell her as a geisha. In a dream, Michiyo remembers her deceased mother, a geisha who was in love with a customer who left her after Michiyo's birth. Yoshiki and Sakuma, sons of upper-class families, spot Michiyo in the backyard of her uncle's house and both fall in love with her. Some time later, Michiyo has become a geisha and is now working under the name of Orie. Yoshiki's father, businessman Fujimoto, has developed a crush on Orie, but seeing the ring on her finger which she received from her mother, he realises that she is his daughter whom he once left behind. Yoshiki, who competed with Sakuma for Orie's love, is devastated to learn that she is his sister. Sakuma and Orie marry, while Yoshiki sets forth on a journey to forget.

== Cast ==
- Shizue Natsukawa as Michiyo/Orie
- Reiji Ichiki as Yoshiki
- Isamu Kosugi as Sakuma
- Eiji Takagi as Fujimoto
- Takako Irie as Sayuriko

== Background ==
The success of the 1929 song "Tōkyō kōshinkyoku", sung by Chiyako Satō, led to the composure of a serialised novel by Hiroshi Kikuchi, the production of Mizoguchi's film by the Nikkatsu studio (while the novel was still unfinished), and even a stage play. Originally planned as a part-talkie with sound interludes containing music, the film was eventually released as a complete silent film. Similar to Mizoguchi's Metropolitan Symphony (Tokai kokyōkyoku), Tokyo March presented love as the link between members of the proletariat and the upper class.

== Home media ==
A 24-minute-long fragment of the film has been published on DVD as complement to Mizoguchi's The Water Magician by Digital MEME in 2007.
