= Arima Neko =

1937 Japanese horror film

Arima neko Ghost-Cat of Arima Palace
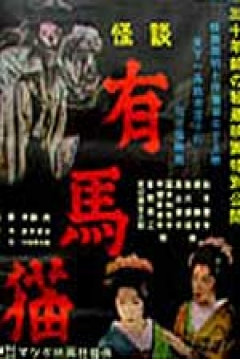
- Theatrical release poster
- Directed by: Shigeru Kito
- Produced by: Shinko
- Release date: October 30, 1937
- Country: Japan
- Language: Japanese

Arima neko (有馬猫), also known as Ghost Cat of Arima (Kaidan arima neko) or Ghost Cat of Arima Palace, is a 1937 Japanese horror film directed by Shigeru Kito. The film was remade in 1953 by Daiei Film.

== See also ==
- Japanese horror
- Ghost-Cat of Gojusan-Tsugi - a 1956 film directed by Bin Kado
- Ghost-Cat Wall of Hatred - a 1958 film directed by Kenji Misumi
