= Ghost Cat of Yonaki Swamp =

1960 Japanese horror film

- Theatrical release poster
- Directed by: Katsuhiko Tasaka
- Written by: Toshio Tamikado
- Starring: Shintaro Katsu; Takako Irie; Michiyo Ai
- Cinematography: Senkichirō Takeda
- Production company: Daiei Film
- Release date: 18 June 1957 (Japan)
- Running time: 90 minutes
- Country: Japan
- Language: Japanese

Ghost Cat of Yonaki Swamp (Japanese: 怪猫夜泣き沼, Hepburn: Kaibyō Yonaki numa), also known as Necromancy, is a 1957 Japanese horror film directed by Katsuhiko Tasaka. It stars Shintaro Katsu and Takako Irie, the latter known for her roles in "ghost cat" films (kaibyō eiga or bake neko mono), with her appearance in Ghost Cat of Yonaki Swamp being her fifth and final such role.

== Cast ==
- Shintaro Katsu
- Takako Irie
- Michiyo Ai
