= Ghost-Cat of Arima Palace =

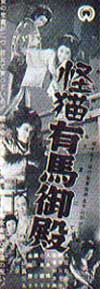
- Theatrical release poster
- Directed by: Ryohei Arai
- Written by: Tōkichi Kinoshita
- Produced by: Masaichi Nagata
- Starring: Takako Irie; Kotaro Bando
- Music by: Nakaba Takahashi
- Production company: Daiei Film
- Release date: December 29, 1953
- Running time: 49 minutes
- Country: Japan
- Language: Japanese

Ghost-Cat of Arima Palace (怪猫有馬御殿, Kaibyō Arima goten) is a 1953 Japanese horror film directed by Ryohei Arai and produced by Daiei Film. Filmed in black and white in the Academy ratio format, it stars Takako Irie and Kotaro Bando.

A prior version of the story, titled Arima Neko, was released in 1937.

== Plot ==
Okoyo, the mistress of Lord Arima, fears that she is being replaced by a younger woman named Otaki. In a fit of jealousy, she kills the younger girl. The dead woman's cat licks her blood and becomes a demon, seeking revenge on Okoyo. There are scenes of disembodied heads floating around and one in which the ghost, with her hands folded in like a cat's paws, forces two of her victims to tumble around repeatedly.

== Cast ==
- Takako Irie
- Michiko Ai
- Kōtarō Bandō
- Teruko Ōmi
- Yoshitaro Sadato
- Shōsaku Sugiyama

== See also ==
- Japanese horror
- Ghost-Cat of Gojusan-Tsugi - a 1956 film directed by Bin Kado
- Ghost-Cat Wall of Hatred - a 1958 film directed by Kenji Misumi
