= The Actress =

1953 film by George Cukor

- Theatrical release poster
- Directed by: George Cukor
- Screenplay by: Ruth Gordon
- Based on: Years Ago; 1946 play by Ruth Gordon
- Produced by: Lawrence Weingarten
- Starring: Spencer Tracy; Jean Simmons; Teresa Wright
- Cinematography: Harold Rosson
- Edited by: George Boemler
- Music by: Bronisław Kaper
- Production company: Metro-Goldwyn-Mayer
- Distributed by: Loew's Inc.
- Release dates: September 25, 1953 (Los Angeles); October 12, 1953 (New York)
- Running time: 90 minutes
- Country: United States
- Language: English
- Budget: $1,424,000
- Box office: $914,000

The Actress is a 1953 American comedy-drama film directed by George Cukor and based on Ruth Gordon's autobiographical play Years Ago. Gordon also wrote the screenplay. The film stars Spencer Tracy, Jean Simmons and Teresa Wright, and it features Anthony Perkins in his film debut.

== Plot ==
In Wollaston, Massachusetts in 1913, teenage student Ruth Gordon Jones dreams of a theatrical career after becoming mesmerized by a performance of The Pink Lady at a Boston theater. She writes a fan letter to leading lady Hazel Dawn, who replies with encouragement for Ruth to pursue her dreams.

Ruth schemes to withdraw from school and move to New York City. However, her father Clinton Jones, a former seaman now working a menial factory job, wants her to continue her education and become a physical-education instructor. Ruth is courted by Fred Whitmarsh, a Harvard student who falls in love with her and proposes marriage.

When Ruth is afforded the chance to audition for a leading producer, she disobeys her father and deflects Fred's romantic overtures to keep the appointment. However, her audition proves disastrous and crushes her confidence and enthusiasm. She confesses to her father what she has done, and although initially angry, he offers to support her during her first few months in New York if she agrees to obtain her high school diploma. Despite his promise, Clinton is not sure how he will find the support money, and he is anxious about his job security. He depends upon his annual bonus, but his employer is slow in paying it.

Her enthusiasm restored, Ruth arranges to move to New York after graduation. On the departure day, Clinton loses his job after confronting his boss about his bonus, leaving him with no money to give to Ruth. When Clinton sees that Ruth is determined to proceed to New York without his monetary support, he gives her his most prized possession, his treasured spyglass from his seafaring days, to sell in New York. The family watches at the railroad station as Ruth departs.

== Cast ==
- Spencer Tracy as Clinton Jones
- Jean Simmons as Ruth Gordon Jones
- Teresa Wright as Annie Jones
- Anthony Perkins as Fred Whitmarsh
- Ian Wolfe as Mr. Bagley
- Kay Williams as Hazel Dawn
- Mary Wickes as Emma Glavey
- Norma Jean Nilsson as Anna Williams
- Dawn Bender as Katherine Follets
- Jackie Coogan as Inopportune (uncredited)

== Production ==
Ruth Gordon's autobiographical play Years Ago, directed by her husband Garson Kanin, debuted on Broadway at New York's Mansfield Theatre on December 3, 1946, starring Frederic March and his wife Florence Eldridge. The play was Gordon's second as a playwright; her first, Over 21, in which she also starred, ran on Broadway for 221 performances.

In May 1947, MGM was reportedly seeking to obtain the screen rights to Gordon's play for a sum speculated to be as high as $450,000. The studio initially planned to team Spencer Tracy with Judy Garland for the film adaptation.

In September 1950, RKO Pictures was nearing a deal for the film rights, with Jerry Wald and Norman Krasna to be the film's producers and Kanin to write the screenplay and direct. However, MGM was the studio that eventually secured the property.

Debbie Reynolds had been considered for the lead role but had conflicting commitments to Give a Girl a Break and The Affairs of Dobie Gillis. Jean Simmons, a hot property recently freed from her RKO Pictures contract, was announced in November 1952.

The film's title was changed from Years Ago to Fame and Fortune in December 1952, the title under which the film entered production the following month. Production was completed by the end of January 1953 and the title was changed to The Actress before the film's release.

== Reception and accolades ==
In a contemporary review for The New York Times, critic Bosley Crowther called the film a "delightful small-theatre surprise" and wrote: "Mr. Tracy's portrait of Papa in this tale of a stubborn father's love for a lone daughter whom he gruffly cherishes is a many-faceted gem, alternately sparkling glints of pathos, spiritual loneliness and swift, corrosive wit. Sparked by excellent writing from Miss Gordon and fine direction from George Cukor's fund of skills, Mr. Tracy conveys a human being who may be understood as much as he is enjoyed. One scene toward the end of the picture, in which he briefs the hard tale of his boyhood, is done with a perfection that is equal to the writing and the placing of the scene."

Critic Philip K. Scheuer of the Los Angeles Times wrote: "'The Actress' is unmistakably a talking picture, but it packs so much wry humor. wit and sadness into what it has to say that you'll hardly notice. Indeed, the sudden but fitting ending may catch you unprepared. Anyhow, Cukor keeps his camera more flexible than most action directors—in any dimension."

According to MGM records, the film earned $594,000 in the U.S. and Canada and $320,000 in other markets, resulting in a loss to the studio of $965,000. It recorded admissions in France of 15,493.

=== Awards ===
The Actress was nominated for an Oscar for Best Costume Design, Black-and-White. Tracy won the Golden Globe Award for Best Motion Picture Actor in a Drama, and he was nominated for a BAFTA for Best Foreign Actor. Simmons was named Best Actress by the National Board of Review, and Gordon's screenplay was nominated Best Written American Comedy by the Writers Guild of America despite being far more dramatic than comedic.
