= Warren Vanders =

American actor (1930–2009)

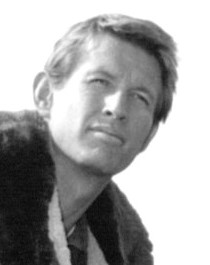
- Vanders as Chuck Davis in Empire, 1963
- Born: Warren John Vanderschuit; May 23, 1930; San Fernando, California, U.S.
- Died: November 27, 2009 (aged 79); Pasadena, California, U.S.
- Occupations: Film and television actor
- Years active: 1958–2006
- Spouse: Dawn Bender (1953–1955)

Warren Vanders (born Warren John Vanderschuit; May 23, 1930 – November 27, 2009) was an American character actor on television and in films.

== Biography ==
He was born in San Fernando, California, as Warren John Vanderschuit. Under the name Warren Vanders, he secured a recurring role as Chuck Davis in fifteen episodes of the NBC modern western television series, Empire. He also portrayed Roy Bean on the TV series Hell Town.

He guest starred in such series as Tate, The Big Valley (twice), The Fugitive (twice), Bonanza (five times between 1965 and 1971), Daniel Boone (eight times), Alias Smith and Jones (as Curly Red Johnson in "The Day the Amnesty Came Through"), The Waltons, Gunsmoke (twelve times), Combat! (twice), Kung Fu, Hawaii Five-O (1970, as Jase Gorman in the episode: The Payoff), The Rockford Files, and How the West Was Won. He appeared in such films as Nevada Smith with Steve McQueen, Hot Lead and Cold Feet, and in the John Wayne/Katharine Hepburn film Rooster Cogburn, in the role of Bagby.

Quentin Tarantino named a character after him in Django Unchained.

He was also a boxer, winning the Los Angeles 1954 Golden Gloves Championship, and continued to box when he was in the United States Navy.

Vanders died on November 27, 2009, at Huntington Memorial Hospital in Pasadena, California, after having lung cancer. He was 79 years old.

== Filmography ==
Year	Title	Role	Notes
1960	The Great Impostor	Minor Role	Uncredited
1967	Rough Night in Jericho	Harvey	
1968	Stay Away, Joe	Hike Bowers	
1968	The Split	Mason	
1969	The Price of Power	Arthur McDonald	
1972	The Revengers	Tarp	
1975	Rooster Cogburn	Bagby	
1977	Little House on the Prairie: "Little Women"	Harold Mayfield	Air Date: 01/24/1977
1978	Hot Lead and Cold Feet	Boss Snead	
2006	Touched	Wylie Tucker	(final film role)
