= Rainbow 'Round My Shoulder =

Film directed by Richard Quine

- Theatrical release poster
- Directed by: Richard Quine
- Written by: Blake Edwards; Richard Quine
- Produced by: Jonie Taps
- Starring: Frankie Laine; Billy Daniels; Charlotte Austin; Arthur Franz
- Cinematography: Ellis W. Carter
- Edited by: Richard Fantl
- Production company: Columbia Pictures
- Distributed by: Columbia Pictures
- Release date: September 1952
- Running time: 78 minutes
- Country: United States
- Language: English

Rainbow 'Round My Shoulder is a 1952 American musical film directed by Richard Quine and written by Blake Edwards and Richard Quine. The film stars Frankie Laine, Billy Daniels, Charlotte Austin, Arthur Franz, Ida Moore and Lloyd Corrigan. The film was released in September 1952, by Columbia Pictures.

== Plot ==
Two singers, Phil Young and Frankie Laine, help Cathy Burke, an aspiring actress whose grandmother Martha Blake opposes her launching a show-business career.

== Cast ==
- Frankie Laine as Frankie Laine
- Billy Daniels as Billy Daniels
- Charlotte Austin as Cathy Blake
- Arthur Franz as Phil Young
- Ida Moore as Martha Blake
- Lloyd Corrigan as Tobias "Toby"
- Barbara Whiting Smith as Suzy Milligan
- Ross Ford as Elliott Livermore
- Arthur Space as Joe Brady
