= Akō gishi =

- Directed by: Ryohei Arai
- Starring: Yataro Kurokawa
- Distributed by: Daiei Film
- Release date: September 15, 1954
- Running time: 98 minutes
- Country: Japan
- Language: Japanese

Akō gishi (赤穂義士; literally, "virtuous men of Ako") is a 1954 Japanese black-and-white period drama (jidaigeki) directed by Ryohei Arai.

== Cast ==
- Yataro Kurokawa
- Kōtarō Bandō
- Miki Sanjo
- Kazuko Fushimi
- Eitarō Shindō

== See also ==
- Forty-seven Ronin
