= Blood of the Vampire =

1958 British film by Henry Cass

- Theatrical release poster
- Directed by: Henry Cass
- Written by: Jimmy Sangster
- Produced by: Robert S. Baker and Monty Berman
- Starring: Donald Wolfit; Barbara Shelley; Vincent Ball; Victor Maddern
- Cinematography: Monty Berman
- Edited by: Douglas Myers
- Music by: Stanley Black
- Production company: Artistes Alliance
- Distributed by: Universal International
- Release date: 26 August 1958 (United Kingdom)
- Running time: 84 minutes
- Language: English

Blood of the Vampire is a 1958 British colour horror film directed by Henry Cass and starring Donald Wolfit, Barbara Shelley, Vincent Ball and Victor Maddern. The film was produced by Robert S. Baker and Monty Berman for Tempean Films, from a screenplay by Jimmy Sangster.

The film's UK release through Universal International was on 26 August 1958. Its American release was on 22 October 1958 as a double feature with Universal's Monster on the Campus (1958).

The film, set in Transylvania, is about a scientist who uses the inmates of a prison for the criminally insane as sources for his gruesome blood-typing and transfusion experiments that are keeping him alive.

== Plot ==
Transylvania …1874.

A man’s body wrapped in a shroud, is shoved into a fresh grave. An executioner drives a stake through its heart. Carl, a severely disfigured mute, then emerges from hiding and kills the gravedigger. Carl summons a drunken doctor to perform a heart transplant on the body then murders the doctor.

Six years later, Dr. John Pierre is convicted of "malpractice leading to manslaughter" after an emergency blood transfusion, which has never been done successfully, fails, killing his patient. Pierre is eventually sentenced to life imprisonment in a penal colony. But instead, he gets sent to a Prison for the Criminal Insane, run by Dr Callistratus. After meeting Callistratus, Pierre learns that he is to help with Calistratus' blood-typing research so that transfusions can be safely done, especially for those with an unnamed "rare and serious blood condition."

At his trial, Pierre maintained that the patient's death was unavoidable and asked the judge to write to Professor Meinster in Geneva to vouch for him. The judge says he already had, but Meinster replied that he does not know this John Pierre.

At the request of Pierre’s fiancée Madeleine and her uncle, Meinster travels to Transylvania, where they meet with Auron, a member of the Prison Commission. Meinster insists that the court never contacted him. Auron, who is on Callistratus's payroll, had intercepted the letter to Meinster and forged a reply. He now must reopen the case.

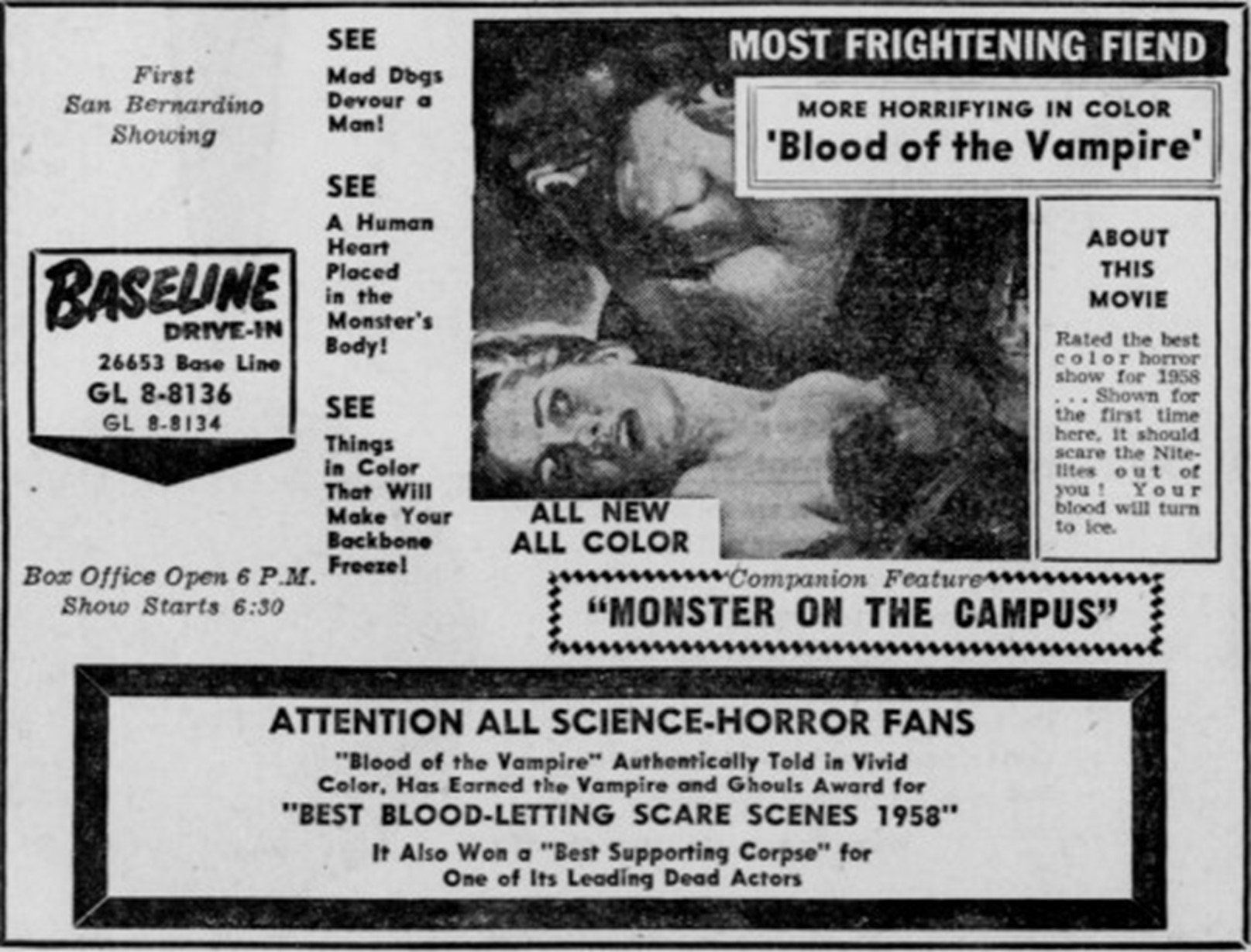
Drive-in advertisement from 1958

Pierre grows increasingly uncomfortable with his work because the blood is from unwilling inmates, many of whom die. Auron revisits Callistratus and says that the Prison Commission has ordered the release of Pierre. Yet Callistratus tells Pierre that the commission has denied his appeal and informs the Commission that John Pierre and another inmate, Kurt, died in an escape attempt. Pierre and Kurt then actually try to escape but fail. Kurt is presumably killed by the Dobermans that keep the prisoners in line. Madeleine refuses to believe that her John is dead and takes a job as Callistratus' housekeeper to investigate. Meanwhile, Pierre has made a breakthrough in the work on the blood typing.

Pierre discovers that Kurt's grave is empty. He sneaks in to see Madeleine, and says she must leave the next day and tell the authorities what she knows. However, Auron visits Callistratus again and recognises Madeleine from their meeting. Auron goes to her room and attempts to force himself on her, but is stopped by Carl, who has fallen in love with her. Callistratus demands an explanation of the assault. Madeleine mentions what happened. Auron denies it and tells Callistratus about her relationship with Pierre. Callistratus throws him out. Insulted, Auron threatens to expose Callistratus. After leaving, Callistratus sends Carl after him.

Callistratus takes Madeleine to his laboratory and shows her his 'experiments', now including a chained, and apparently dead, Auron. He chains her to the wall. Receiving a message from Carl, in the form of a key wrapped in Madeline's handkerchief, John arrives to rescue her but is also chained. Callistratus orders Carl to strap Madeleine to an operating table, but Carl refuses. Callistratus shoots him. Callistratus straps her down himself and wheels out Kurt, now just a torso with a head and one arm, and boasts of his skill in saving Kurt after the dogs' attack. Callistratus tells John that he was executed, accused of being a vampire, because of his previous unethical work with blood, but had put himself into suspended animation. The heart transplant revived him, but he now has the "rare and fatal blood condition" he mentioned earlier. He needs constant transfusions and has drained all the blood of many inmates. Using Pierre’s new discovery about blood types, Callistratus now intends to transfuse Madeleine's blood into Kurt, whom he has infected with the same blood condition that he has, but in a stronger form. If Kurt survives, he will then be able to treat himself.

Pierre yells to Kurt to "resist," and Kurt grips Callistratus' arm. As they struggle, they move close enough for Pierre to knock Callistratus unconscious and free himself. Kurt dies from the exertion. Pierre unstraps Madeleine and takes Callistratus hostage, demanding free passage from the prison. They walk free, but Carl, who survived Callistratus' shot, frees the hounds then dies after being shot again by the guards.

The horrific story ends; as the Dobermans tear Callistratus to shreds.

== Cast ==
Opening and closing credits differ. This list in the order of the end credits, with corrections and additions from the British Film Institute (BFI).

- Donald Wolfit as Callistratus
- Vincent Ball as John Pierre
- Barbara Shelley as Madeleine
- Victor Maddern as Carl
- William Devlin as Kurt
- Andrew Faulds as Wetzler
- John Le Mesurier as judge
- Brian Coleman as Auron ('Bryan' is correct spelling & used in opening credits)
- Cameron Hall as drunken doctor
- George Murcell as first guard
- Julian Strange as second guard (not in opening credits)
- Bruce Whiteman as third guard (not in opening credits)
- Barbara Burke as housekeeper
- Bernard Bresslaw as tall sneak thief
- Hal Osmond as small sneak thief
- Henry Vidon as Professor Meinster
- John Stuart as uncle
- Colin Tapley as Commissioner of Prisons
- Muriel Ali as gypsy dancer
- Max Brimmell as warder (not in opening credits)
- Denis Shaw as blacksmith (not in opening credits)
- Otto Diamant as gravedigger
- Milton Reed as executioner (not in opening credits; BFI spells surname 'Reid')
- Richard Golding as official

Theodore Williams' name appears in the opening credits, but neither the actor's nor the character's name are in the end credits. BFI refers to him as the 'Emaciated Prisoner'. BFI also includes five additional uncredited performers: Yvonne Buckingham (Serving Wench); Sylvia Casimir (Laughing Woman at Tavern); Suzanne Lee (Uncredited); Gordon Honeycombe (as stretcher bearer); and Carlos Williams (stretcher bearer).

In addition to BFI's additions, The Internet Movie Data Base (IMDb) includes as uncredited performers: Alf Mangan (Prisoner); Mary Marshall (Woman Prisoner); and Patricia Phoenix (Woman). Marshall and Phoenix's scenes were cut from the UK theatrical version by the BBFC, but can be seen in the "Continental" version recently restored for Blu-ray.

== Production ==
The film was inspired by the success of Hammer's The Curse of Frankenstein (1957) and The Horror of Dracula (1958). The film is sometimes mistaken by fans for being a Hammer film. The producers hired Jimmy Sangster, writer of both those movies, to do the screenplay. Shooting took four weeks. Blood of the Vampire was distributed in the UK by Eros Films and in the US by Universal International.

Posters for Blood of the Vampire indicate that it was considered an adults-only film in France and the UK at the time of its release. French posters note that viewing by people under age 16 was prohibited and UK posters show that the film carried an X Certificate from the British Board of Film Censors, which prohibited the exhibition of the movie to those under 16. The X Certificate is indicative of the activities of Eros Film Distributors, which had by then deliberately 'embarked on a new X-certificate path'. Tempean Productions 'embraced' not only films designed to get an X cert, but also 'Eros's policy of offering co-feature programmes which could be marketed not only in Britain, but also on the American drive-in circuits'.

Producing films for drive-in theatres was apparently successful. According to a contemporary newspaper advertisement, the Moonlite Drive-In in Smithtown, Pennsylvania, on Wednesday, 3 August 1960 ran a dawn-to-dusk triple feature with Blood of the Vampire as the first movie – nearly two years after its American release – Revenge of Frankenstein (1958) the second and The Beast of Hollow Mountain (1956) the third. As a promotion, attendees whose tickets ended in 13 were treated to 'Dracula's Buffet Luncheon', which consisted of 'Dracula's Blood Cocktail, Deviled Zombie Snacks, Crispy Skull Chips, Devil Fruit, Voodoo Spirits' and a 'Werewolf Tail Sandwich'.

Blood of the Vampire was released over a considerable amount of time in a number of countries. After its London premiere on 26 August 1958, it opened in the US on October 22, 1958, and was followed by Germany in December 1958, the Netherlands in April 1959, France in April 1960, Japan in July 1960, Spain in 1966 and Sweden in October 1969. The film also played in theatres in Belgium, Italy, Greece and Brazil. It was re-released theatrically in France in 1986, as well. The running time of the film was 84 minutes in the UK and 87 minutes in the USA.

== Release ==
Blood of the Vampire was released by Universal International in the United States on October 22, 1958, playing with Monster on the Campus (1958)..

On its release in the United States, it had an 87 minute running time.

== Reception ==
Initial reviews of Blood of the Vampire were mixed. Review Digest in the 19 January 1959 issue of BoxOffice magazine showed the following ratings: Harrison's Report and Film Daily called the film "very good"; BoxOffice, The Hollywood Reporter, and Parents' Magazine rated it as "good"; and Variety called it "fair". The New York Daily News, always a part of "Review Digest", did not review the film.

In summarizing contemporary reviews, film critic Bill Warren writes that "although the film was popular and still has its adherents, Blood of the Vampire was not greeted by much enthusiasm by film critics, although most thought it somewhat above average". For example, Charles Stinson of The Los Angeles Times wrote, "it is gratifying to be able to turn in an on-the-whole good report on the film. It is "intelligently scripted and well acted by a group of British performers". Jack Moffitt of The Hollywood Reporter, whom Warren calls "hard-to-please", wrote in his review that the film "rates more serious audience attention than most of the contemporary rash of domestic horror films. Direction by Henry Cass is brisk enough to keep yawning from being contagious to the audience".

Reviews from the U.K. were mixed. According to film critic John Hamilton, Film Daily described the film as "one of the best films in the horror-fiction category. It ventures into gore and supernatural with a headlong grandeur", while The Monthly Film Bulletin took a dimmer view, calling it "an essay in hokum" and stating that the producers incorporated "every trick of the macabre and the horrific they can legitimately introduce".

In a more modern view of the film, historian Paul Adams points out that "Blood of the Vampire is a vampire film in name only as ... the undead creature of the title is in fact a human scientist, rather than a true nosferatu, resurrected from beyond the grave by an impromptu heart transplant and subsequently kept alive by frequent and gory Eastman Color blood transfusions courtesy of the inmates of a local insane asylum". Author Paul Meehan calls the film "packed with the blood, gore and sadism of Jimmy Sangster's script" and notes that "grafting an element of science fiction onto the traditional notion of vampirism" doesn't work all that well. "The film's pseudoscience, such as do-it-yourself 19th century heart-transplant surgery and suspended animation, strains credulity while reaching for a scientific rationale for vampire resurrection".

In Warren's view, "It's a shade better than some of its class, but the lumpy direction, muddled plot, and slow pace make it look much worse now than it did when it was new ... This is horror by the book, circa 1958, and it's pretty drab ... Cass' direction is, at best, pedestrian, but he probably had little time to do anything". Taking the opposite view, Meehan says, "Director Henry Cass moves the plot along vigorously while providing effective gothic atmosphere". British critic Phil Hardy seems to agree, calling it a "superior British horror movie" and "probably the routine Cass's best movie".

Warren finds some virtue in the film, though, calling the art direction by John Elphink "imaginative" and noting that "several sets seem positively cavernous", probably because of lens choice by cinematographer Geoffrey Seaholme. But overall the result is disappointing because Wolfit "is made up to resemble Bela Lugosi, which he otherwise does not" and because "characters pop up, deliver their lines, and are quickly disposed of". In the end, he writes, "Blood of the Vampire is notable today for its bogus qualities: it is a fake Hammer film, about a scientific vampire, with an imitation Bela Lugosi".

== Television ==
Clips from Blood of the Vampire are featured in two episodes of the TV series 100 Years of Horror: in episode No. 2, "Blood-Drinking Creatures", which originally aired on 19 December 1996, and in episode No. 15, "Scream Queens", first shown 17 April 1997. Film posters or clips were shown in the made-for-television film Hollywood's Creepiest Creatures, hosted by Elvira, and airing on Halloween Night 2004.

== Home video ==
Blood of the Vampire has been available for home viewing for decades in the U.S. It was first released in 1978 on VHS and Betamax by Magnetic Video. Gorgon Films later released the film on VHS in 1993. A 2006 DVD release followed from Dark Sky Films. Theatrical trailers from the film were used in the 1996 VHS release, Nightmare Theater's Late Night Chill-o-rama Horror Show Vol.1.

Finding the film in the U.K. seems to have been more difficult. Hardy wrote in 1986 that "all prints of it appear to have been destroyed". The first mention of it being available in the U.K. for home viewing is its 2007 DVD release by Simply Media.
