= The Man Who Turned to Stone =

1957 film by László Kardos

- Theatrical release insert poster
- Directed by: László Kardos (as Laszlo Kardos)
- Written by: Bernard Gordon (as Raymond T. Marcus)
- Produced by: Sam Katzman
- Starring: Victor Jory; Ann Doran; Charlotte Austin
- Cinematography: Benjamin H. Kline
- Edited by: Charles Nelson
- Production company: Sam Katzman Productions
- Distributed by: Columbia Pictures
- Release date: March 1957
- Running time: 72 minutes
- Country: United States
- Language: English

The Man Who Turned to Stone (a.k.a. The Petrified Man) is a 1957 American black-and-white horror science fiction film directed by László Kardos and starring Victor Jory, Ann Doran and Charlotte Austin. The screenplay was written by Bernard Gordon under his pen name Raymond T. Marcus. The Man Who Turned to Stone was released in 1957 on a double bill with another Katzman-produced film, Zombies of Mora Tau.

== Plot ==
Two social workers, Dr. Jess Rogers and Carol Adams grow concerned over the number of deaths of young women at the La Salle Detention Home for Girls. The otherwise healthy inmates have been dying of heart failure or suicide. The social workers meet the manager of the detention home, Dr. Murdock.

Tracy, one of the inmates, discovers a hidden laboratory. The lab is the base for a group of unethical doctors who learned a hundred years ago to extend their lives by draining the vitality of others. Without such transfusions, they begin to slowly petrify. They have become the medical staff of doctors at the home, assuring a steady supply of vital young bodies to feed upon.

Rogers and Adams begin a quiet investigation, eventually exposing the doctors and their crimes and saving future victims.

== Cast ==
- Victor Jory as Dr. Murdock
- Ann Doran as Mrs. Ford
- Charlotte Austin as Carol Adams
- William Hudson as Dr. Jess Rogers
- Paul Cavanagh as Cooper
- Tina Carver as Big Marge Collins
- Jean Willes as Tracy
- Victor Varconi as Dr. Myer
- Friedrich von Ledebur as Eric (as Frederick Ledebur)
- George Lynn as Dr. Freneau

== Production ==
Written by Hollywood blacklist screenwriter Bernard Gordon, who used the pseudonym Raymond T. Marcus for this picture.

== Reception ==
The Encyclopedia of Science Fiction found the movie covered ground that even at the time of release were already passé. It stated that the movie blends the juvenile delinquency genre with the horror-scifi which helps the movie and that the acting was credible. Variety found the movie a lesser work in the horror genre, adequate to hold the lower half of a double feature.

== See also ==
- List of American films of 1957
