= Dawn Bender =

American actress

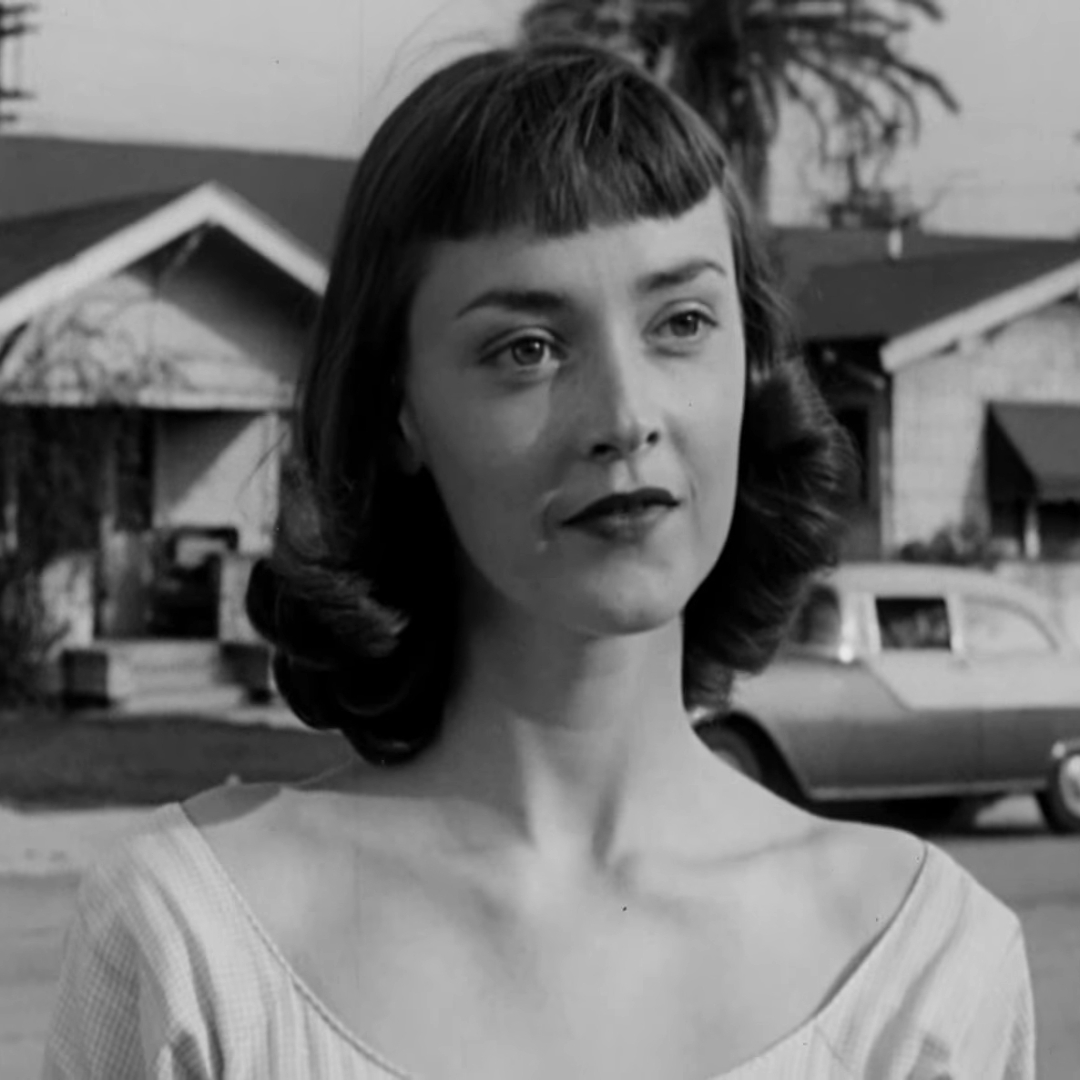
- Dawn Bender as Betty Morgan in Teenagers from Outer Space (1959)
- Born: Glendale, California, U.S.
- Occupation: Actress
- Years active: 1937–1959
- Spouses: Warren Vanders (1953-1955); Jerry Anderson; Emmett Jacobs

Dawn Bender is an American film, stage, and radio actress, most famous for the role of Margaret on the radio drama One Man's Family and Betty Morgan in Teenagers from Outer Space.

== Early life ==
Bender was born in Glendale, California. She attended Vista Colina School in Eagle Rock, Los Angeles.

== Film ==
Bender landed her first role as an infant playing the role of baby Lisa in Joe May's 1937 film Confession, in which she was featured alongside such greats as Basil Rathbone, Ian Hunter and "box-office poison" Kay Francis. She was featured in a number of films, including Till We Meet Again (1944), A Song to Remember (1945), George Sanders caper The Strange Affair of Uncle Harry (1945), Suspense (1946), and John Wayne drama Island in the Sky (1953).

== Radio ==
She was a member of the "500 Club", composed of child actors who had appeared in at least 500 radio shows.

Aged 7, Bender was cast as little Margaret Herbert in the popular radio drama One Man's Family. The role made her a household name, and she continued as Margaret for 17 years, through the series' conclusion in 1959. Her other roles on radio programs included Susan Fitz on His Honor the Barber, Susan Sample on Cousin Willie, and Maggie Truitt on The Trouble with the Truitts. She was also a regular on The George Burns and Gracie Allen Show and on the soap opera Bob and Victoria.

Bender also appeared on Errand of Mercy and Screen Directors Playhouse.

== Stage ==
Bender appeared in a number of stage plays throughout the Los Angeles area.

== Personal life ==
On June 26, 1953, Bender married fellow Pasadena City College student and future Gunsmoke actor Warren Vanders (né VanderSchuit). In 1955, Dawn married fellow Pepperdine drama student, Jerry Anderson, with whom she had two children. Her third husband of many decades, retired Loyola professor Emmett Jacobs, died on January 11, 2015.

== Later career ==
In 1953, Bender had a supporting role in Ruth Gordon's semi-autobiographical film The Actress, based on her novel Years Ago. The film was directed by George Cukor, and starred Spencer Tracy, Jean Simmons, and Anthony Perkins.

Despite her career's upswing and her status as an up-and-coming ingenue, Bender tired of the demands of acting, and prepared to retire to married life. In 1956, she was recruited by a friend of a friend to act in Tom Graeff's second feature Teenagers from Outer Space. Finally cast in a leading role, Dawn played Betty Morgan, a girl who helps a rebel alien save earth from imminent destruction. She is credited in the film under the name "Dawn Anderson", using her married name to avoid strict SAG rules. (Another actor on Teenagers, King Moody, did not fare so well — in 1962 he and four other SAG actors were fined by the Guild for working below pay scale.)

The film debuted in 1959 but by then, Bender's career was winding down. She starred in her last play, André Gide's The Immoralist in 1962, and retired shortly after.

She earned a teaching degree from Loyola Marymount University in the 1970s, and eventually went on to become a schoolteacher in Los Angeles County, where she taught for almost 40 years. She has since retired and still lives in the Los Angeles area.

== Filmography ==
- Confession (Uncredited, 1937)
- Till We Meet Again (Uncredited, 1944)
- A Song to Remember (Uncredited, 1945)
- The Strange Affair of Uncle Harry (1945)
- Suspense (Uncredited, 1946)
- Island in the Sky (Uncredited, 1953)
- The Actress (1953)
- Teenagers from Outer Space (1959) (credited as Dawn Anderson)
