= Charlotte Austin =

American actress (born 1933)

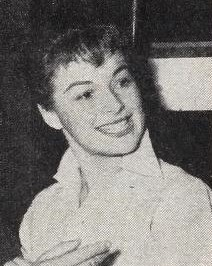
- Austin in 1954
- Born: November 2, 1933 (age 93); Charlotte, North Carolina, U.S.
- Occupation: Actress
- Years active: 1952–1962
- Spouse: Jon P. Antelline (m. 1965; div. 1969)
- Children: 1
- Father: Gene Austin

Charlotte Austin (born November 2, 1933) is an American retired actress. She appeared in leading and supporting roles in the 1950s, mostly active in B-films.

== Early years ==
Charlotte Austin was born on November 2, 1933, in Charlotte, North Carolina. Her father was the American singer and songwriter Gene Austin. Her mother (the former Agnes Antelline) was also a singer. While born in North Carolina as Gene was visiting on a performance tour, she was raised in Burbank, California by her mother and step-father, Ned Kalmer.

== Career ==
Austin signed a contract with 20th Century Fox in the early 1950s and attended the studio's school. Her film career began with an uncredited role in Belles on Their Toes (1952). This was followed by a couple of other uncredited roles. That same year, she had a starring role in the Columbia Pictures musical Rainbow 'Round My Shoulder alongside Frankie Laine, Billy Daniels, and Arthur Franz. In the film, she sang, danced, and did a ballet performance. The following year, she had a supporting role in the Technicolor musical comedy film The Farmer Takes a Wife. It starred Betty Grable and Dale Robertson. She had a small role in How to Marry a Millionaire (1953), and was described by The Charlotte Observer as one of the 20th Century Fox's stars of the future.

In 1954, Austin had supporting roles in the horror mystery film Gorilla at Large and in the historical romance film Désirée. The former was the second film distributed by 20th Century Fox to be filmed in 3-D. The latter was nominated for two Academy Awards, for Best Art Direction (color) (Lyle R. Wheeler, Leland Fuller, Walter M. Scott, Paul S. Fox) and Best Costume Design (René Hubert and Charles LeMaire). In 1955, she had supporting roles in Daddy Long Legs and How to Be Very, Very Popular. In 1958, she starred in the low-budget horror film The Bride and the Beast. The screenplay was made by the future infamous film director Ed Wood. She later stated that she thought the script was awful. She continued to act in film and television series until the early 1960s. After retiring, she ran an antique store.

== Personal life ==
Austin married John Antelline in 1965. They later divorced. She is a registered Democrat.

== Filmography ==
Year	Title	Role
1952	Belles on Their Toes	Student (uncredited)
1952	Les Misérables	Student (uncredited)
1952	Monkey Business	Student (uncredited)
1952	Rainbow 'Round My Shoulder	Cathy Blake
1953	The Farmer Takes a Wife	Pearl Dowd
1953	How to Marry a Millionaire	Model (uncredited)
1954	Gorilla at Large	Audrey Baxter
1954	Desiree	Paulette Bonaparte
1954	There's No Business Like Show Business	Lorna (uncredited)
1955	Daddy Long Legs	Sally McBride
1955	How to Be Very, Very Popular	Midge
1957	The Man Who Turned to Stone	Carol Adams
1957	Pawnee	Dancing fawn
1958	The Bride and the Beast	Laura
1958	Frankenstein 1970	Judy Stevens
