= The Bride and the Beast =

1958 film

- Directed by: Adrian Weiss
- Screenplay by: Edward D. Wood, Jr.
- Story by: Adrian Weiss
- Produced by: Adrian Weiss
- Starring: Lance Fuller; Charlotte Austin; Johnny Roth; William Justine; Jeanne Gerson
- Cinematography: Roland Price
- Edited by: George Merrick
- Music by: Les Baxter
- Production company: An Adrian Weiss Production
- Distributed by: Allied Artists Pictures Corporation
- Release date: 29 January 1958 (San Diego)
- Running time: 78 minutes
- Country: United States
- Language: English

The Bride and the Beast is a 1958 American horror film produced and directed by Adrian Weiss. The film's screenplay was written by Ed Wood, based on a story by Weiss. Wood's original working title was Queen of the Gorillas.

== Plot ==
Dan Fuller, a big game hunter, is forced to kill his pet gorilla when it attempts to rape his new bride Laura. The woman starts to experience strange urgings following the encounter, and submits to hypnosis under the care of a psychiatrist. She reveals to her shocked husband that she was actually a gorilla in a previous life. Slowly she reverts to her former bestial self, and winds up eloping into the jungle with a male ape, with her cuckolded husband staring helplessly after them.

== Cast ==
- Charlotte Austin as Laura
- Lance Fuller as Dan
- Johnny Roth as Taro and the Beast
- William Justine as Dr. Reiner
- Jeanne Gerson as Marka
- Gil Frye as Capt. Cameron
- Slick Slavin as Soldier
- Bhogwan Singh as Native
- Jean Ann Lewis as Stewardess

== Production ==
Ed Wood was inspired by the real-life Bridey Murphy story currently in the headlines, and worked stock jungle animal footage from a Sabu movie into the storyline.

Mark Thomas McGee said that Weiss told him that he considered the film "a minor classic", while lead actress Charlotte Austin commented on the incredible cheapness, using one of Weiss's relatives to physically turn the wheels of the stationary truck the actors were sitting in, to make it appear the vehicle was moving.

== Release ==
The Bride and the Beast opened in San Diego on January 29, 1958.

Variety felt that it "will need lurid advertising to pay off."
