= Teenagers from Outer Space (film) =

1959 film by Tom Graeff

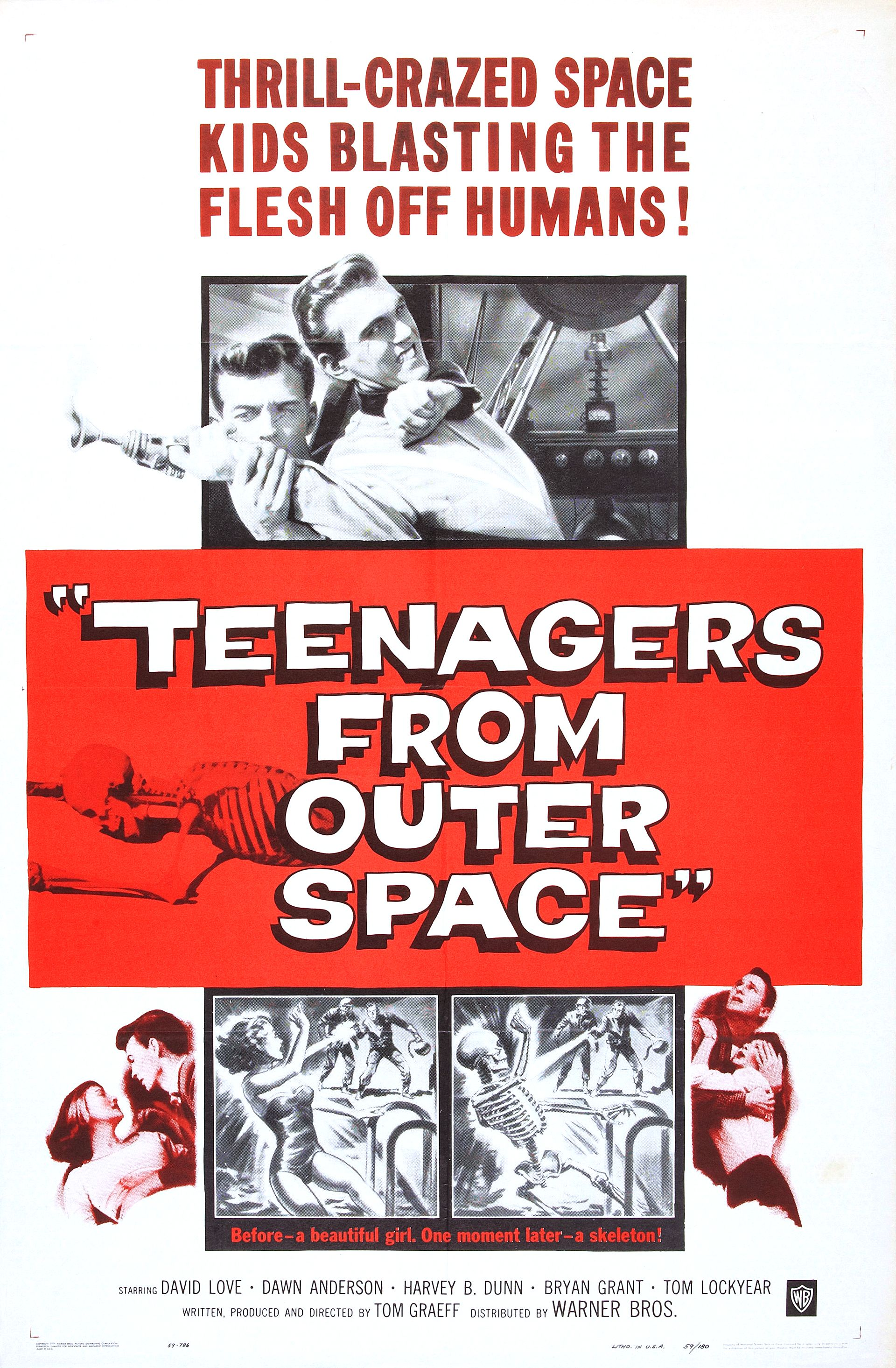
- Theatrical release poster by Reynold Brown
- Directed by: Tom Graeff
- Screenplay by: Tom Graeff
- Produced by: Tom Graeff
- Starring: David Love; Dawn Anderson; Harvey B. Dunn; Bryan Grant; Tom Lockyear
- Cinematography: Tom Graeff
- Edited by: Tom Graeff
- Production company: Tom Graeff Productions
- Distributed by: Warner Bros. Pictures
- Release date: June 2, 1959
- Running time: 86 minutes
- Country: United States
- Language: English
- Budget: $20,000

Teenagers from Outer Space (released in the UK as The Gargon Terror) is a 1959 American independent black-and-white science fiction cult film released by Warner Bros. Pictures. The film was produced, written and directed by Tom Graeff and stars David Love, Dawn Bender, Bryan Grant, Harvey B. Dunn and Tom Lockyear. The film's working titles were The Boy from Outer Space and The Ray Gun Terror. The tagline was "Hoodlums from Another World in a Ray-Gun Rampage!"

Teenagers from Outer Space was distributed theatrically by Warner Bros. on June 2, 1959. It played on a double feature with the Japanese film Gigantis the Fire Monster.

In the film, a young alien named Derek becomes a fugitive on Earth after he defies his crew's directive to eradicate human life in order to use Earth as grazing grounds for giant voracious livestock they call Gargons.

In 1987, the film entered the public domain in the United States because Warner Bros. did not renew its copyright registration in the 28th year after publication.

== Plot ==
A flying saucer arrives on Earth, searching for planets suitable to raise Gargons, lobster-like but air-breathing monsters that are a reserve food supply on their home planet. Crewman Thor vaporizes a dog named Sparky with a raygun. Another crew member, Derek, discovers an inscription on Sparky's dog tag and concludes Earth is inhabited by intelligent beings, and therefore they must search elsewhere for Gargon raising grounds, since once full-grown Gargons are a grave menace. The other aliens see no need to spare Earth; they regard themselves as the supreme race, and pride themselves that families and friendships are forbidden on their world. Derek draws a raygun on them and reveals an ancient book distributed by an underground rebellion, which commemorates the more humane periods of their world's history.

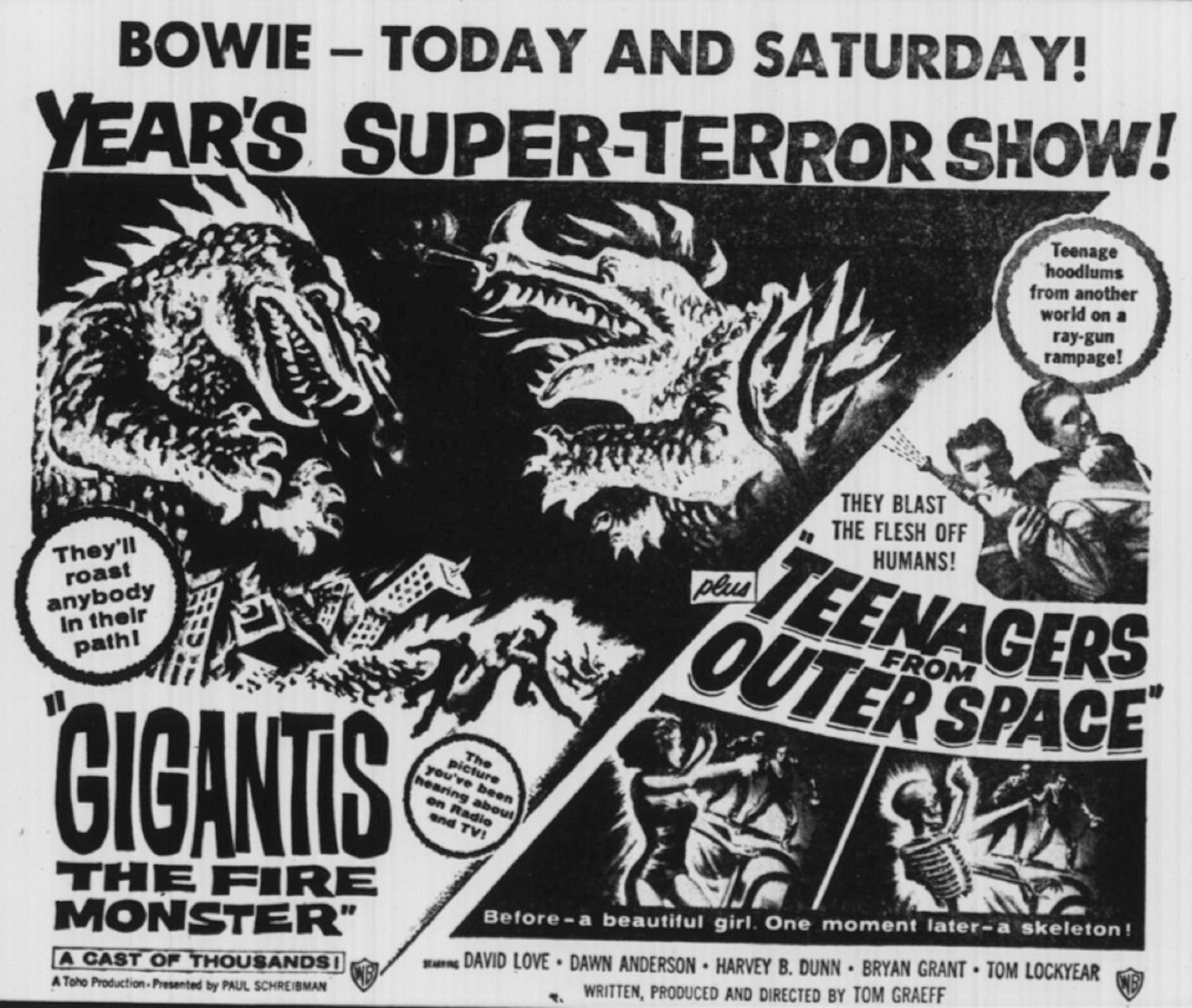
Advertisement from 1959 for Teenagers from Outer Space and co-feature Gigantis the Fire Monster

The Captain and Thor disarm Derek. Taking him prisoner, they plan to have Derek tried and executed. The Gargon they brought with them falls sick to Earth's atmosphere, indicating that the planet is unusable. While his crew members are distracted, Derek escapes on foot. The Gargon regains consciousness, having adapted to the atmosphere. When the Captain gives his report, he is informed that Derek is the son of the Leader of their race, although he is unaware of this. Thor is sent to hunt down Derek, with orders to bring him back alive or kill him and any other intelligent beings to protect their mission to Earth. The rest of the crew returns to their home world, leaving the Gargon in a nearby cave.

Teenagers from Outer Space (full movie, public domain)

Derek finds the address on the dog's tag, where he meets Betty Morgan and her Grandpa. They have a room to rent, and Derek inadvertently becomes a boarder. When Betty's friend, reporter Joe Rogers, cannot make it to their afternoon swim at Alice Woodward's place, Derek tags along with Betty. He shows the tag to Betty, who recognizes it. Derek takes her to the place where the spacecraft landed. He shows her Sparky's remains and describes Thor's weapon, that can also vaporize humans. Betty vows to help Derek stop his crew mate.

Betty and Derek have several run-ins with Thor, who vaporizes several humans (including Alice and Betty's teacher, Professor Simpson) to keep them from raising the alarm. Joe follows up on stories of skeletons popping up all over town. Thor is wounded in a shootout with the police, and kidnaps both Derek and Betty to help him receive medical attention, in the process revealing Derek's parentage to them. Two car chases and a gunfight follow. Thor is captured by Earth authorities after plummeting off a cliff in a stolen car.

The Gargon grows immensely large after devouring a policeman investigating the aliens' landing site and attacks numerous people. Derek and Betty go to the car wreck site to look for Thor's raygun. They kiss and Derek vows, "I shall make the Earth my home. And I shall never, never leave it." The Gargon appears. Derek finds the raygun under a rock, but it is damaged and unable to fire. The Gargon heads towards the town. Derek and Betty follow and confront it, using electricity from the overhead power lines to fuel the raygun's components and kill the Gargon. The invading fleet appears in Earth's orbit.

Derek retrieves Thor from the police and forces Joe to drive him to the landing site, using the damaged raygun as a bluff. Betty is baffled as to why Derek is acting so brutish and seemingly going back on his vow, but she heeds his plea for her to trust him and does not tell Joe that the raygun is inoperative. At the landing site Derek reunites with the Captain and meets his father for the first time. Derek pretends to feel regret for his insubordination and offers to guide the spaceships to land. Derek then goes into the spacecraft, closes the hatch to cut off the other aliens, and leads the invasion fleet at full speed directly towards his ground location, destroying them all. Derek's father, the Captain and Thor are killed in the process. Betty realizes that Derek in fact kept his vow.

== Cast ==
- David Love as Derek
- Dawn Bender (billed as Dawn Anderson) as Betty Morgan
- Bryan Pearson (billed as Bryan Grant) as Thor
- Harvey B. Dunn as Gramps Morgan
- Tom Graeff (billed as Tom Lockyear) as Joe Rogers
- King Moody as Spacecraft Captain
- Ralph Lowe as Morro, Spaceship Crew
- Bill DeLand as Sol, Spaceship Crew
- Billy Bridges as Motorist picking up Thor
- Sonia Torgeson as Alice Woodward
- Jim MacGeorge as Detective Mac
- Frederick Welch as Dr. C.R. Brandt, MD
- Helen Sage as Nurse Morse
- Gene Sterling as The Alien Leader
- Sol Resnick as the Junior Astronomer
- Don Chambers as the Senior Astronomer
- Carl Dickensen as Gas Station Attendant
- Ursula Pearson (billed as Ursula Hansen) as Hilda, Simpson's Secretary
- James Conklin as Professor Simpson

== Production ==
Teenagers from Outer Space was filmed on location in and around Hollywood, California, in the fall of 1956 and winter of 1957. With a number of tell-tale landmarks like Bronson Canyon in Griffith Park and Hollywood High School, which gives away the film's otherwise generic location. One notable aspect of the film is that it was largely the work of a single person, Tom Graeff, who, in addition to playing the role of reporter Joe Rogers, wrote, directed, edited and produced the film, on which he also provided cinematography, special effects and music coordination. Producers Bryan and Ursula Pearson ("Thor" and "Hilda") and Gene Sterling ("The Leader") provided the film's $14,000 budget, which was less than shoestring even by the standards of the day.

=== Cost-effective measures ===
According to Bryan Pearson, the crew employed many guerrilla tactics in order to cut costs: Director Tom Graeff secured, for free, the location used for Betty Morgan's house by posing as a UCLA student (which he had attended and graduated from 5 years earlier). The older woman who owned the house even let the crew use her electricity to power their equipment.

Graeff shot in many nearby locations, mostly in the vicinity of Sunset Boulevard and Highland Avenue, that doubled as more important city landmarks. Graeff's steady hand and framing kept most of the real locations subdued, creating a convincing low-budget illusion of a small town.

Other cost-cutting measures did not work as well; the aliens' costumes were simple flight suits clearly decorated with masking tape, dress shoes covered in socks and surplus Air Force flight helmets. The use of stock footage in lieu of real special effects, and pre-Spielbergian "looking" shots that replaced actual visuals of the invading alien spaceships, seriously undercut the film's ending. Props included a single-bolted-joint skeleton re-used for every dead body seen on screen, a multi-channel sound mixer that was not camouflaged (clearly bearing the label "Multichannel Mixer MCM-2") as a piece of alien equipment and a dime store Hubley's "Atomic Disintegrator" toy as the aliens' disintegrator ray gun.

Graeff hired special effects technician Paul Blaisdell to slightly modify the ray guns with small slivers of mirror to make the guns look as if they were really firing a ray. Blaisdell said Graeff also paid him to design the film's one-sheet poster, but Graeff could not afford Blaisdell's fee to design the Gargon monsters that appear in the film (Graeff did those effects himself by superimposing silhouetted images of various animals in Bert I. Gordon fashion).

=== Sound design and score ===
Graeff also pre-recorded some of the film's dialogue for several scenes and had the actors lip-synchronize their dialogue with their scene actions, using a novel synchronization system invented by director Tom Graeff, dubbed Cinemagraph. The film score used stock music, which had been composed by William Loose and Fred Steiner. The same stock music has been recycled in countless B-movies, like Red Zone Cuba, The Killer Shrews and most notably Night of the Living Dead.

== Release and legacy ==
In June 1958 Bryan Pearson, who invested $5,000 in the production with his wife Ursula, took Graeff to court in order to gain back the original investment and a percentage of any profits. The Pearsons had learned that Graeff had allegedly sold the film (originally titled The Boy From Out of This World), which did not happen until early 1959. He heard nothing more on their investment or a percentage of profits to which they were entitled. The legal dispute dragged on for a year. Pearson received his $5,000 investment, but the judge ruled there was no profit to share. Graeff and the Pearsons, who had been good friends during the production of Teenagers, never spoke to each other again.

The film was played theatrically in June 1959 on a double feature with the Japanese film Gigantis the Fire Monster. It failed to perform at the box office, placing further stress on an already-burdened Graeff, and in the fall of 1959, he suffered a breakdown, proclaiming himself as the second coming of Christ. After a number of public appearances, followed by a subsequent arrest for disrupting a church service, Graeff disappeared from Hollywood until 1964. He committed suicide in 1970.

The film went on to become a cult classic among sci-fi fans and was later shown on Mystery Science Theater 3000 (as well as "riffed"), Elvira's Movie Macabre, Off Beat Cinema, and Svengoolie. It was also included as an extra in the video game Destroy All Humans!; it becomes unlocked and ready to play in full once the player beats the game.

In Disney's Hollywood Studios, while eating at the Sci-Fi Dine-In Theater Restaurant theme restaurant, guests watch film clips from 1950s and 1960s science fiction films, B horror films, monster movies, pseudo-documentaries, bizarre newsreels, and animated cartoons, all on a loop. One of the film clips is from Teenagers from Outer Space.

=== Critical reception ===
The film opened on June 2, 1959, to negative, but not crippling, reviews: the Los Angeles Times review stated "what a curious little film this is [...] there are flashes of astonishing sensitivity half-buried in the mass of tritisms". And of the director, Tom Graeff, "when he stops spreading himself so incredibly thin, I think his work will bear watching". Writing in DVD Savant, although film critic Glenn Erickson described the film as "staged at the level of a high-school play," with the giant Gargon "...a crudely-matted silhouette that may be the least-convincing [special] effect of the 1950s," the film nevertheless is "actually quite touching - the show finds its own humble level of dramatic integrity." Film critic Phil Hall wrote that "this 1959 Grade Z effort isn’t as awful as many people would like to insist," that "much of the charm ... lies in the vim and vigor that reinforces its patent absurdity," and added that it "provide[s] genuine entertainment – you may giggle at times for the wrong reasons, but you’ll never get bored watching it."

== Public domain status ==
In 1987, the film entered the public domain in the United States and worldwide because Warner Bros. did not renew the film's copyright registration in the 28th year after its creation. As a result, the film has received numerous "bargain bin" DVD releases. MST3K's version was released by Rhino Home Video as part of their "Collection, Volume 6" box set.

== See also ==
- List of American films of 1959
- List of films in the public domain in the United States
