= The Water Magician =

1933 Kenji Mizoguchi film

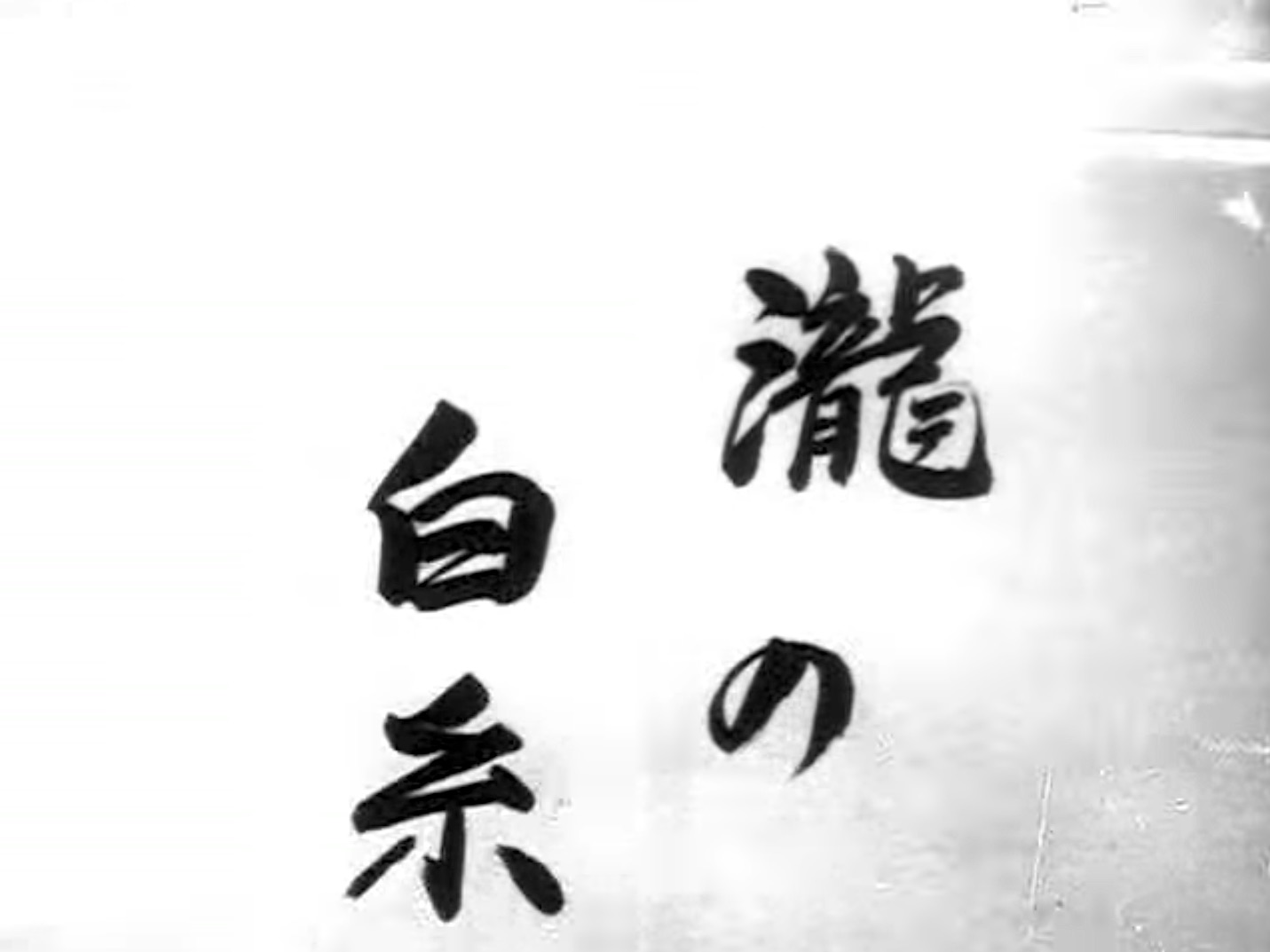
- Title card
- Directed by: Kenji Mizoguchi
- Written by: Higashibojo Yasunaga; Shinji Masuda; Kennosuke Tateoka
- Based on: Taki no shiraito; by Kyōka Izumi
- Starring: Takako Irie; Tokihiko Okada; Suzuko Taki; Ichirō Sugai
- Cinematography: Shigeru Miki
- Edited by: Sakaneda Tsuruko
- Distributed by: Shinkō Kinema
- Release date: 1 June 1933
- Running time: 3,255 meters (Note: Projected at sound film projection speed (24 fps), 3,255 meters (the film's original length according to Kinenote, the Japanese Movie Database, and the Japanese Cinema Database) equal 119 minutes running time, or longer, if projected at silent film projection speed (16–20 fps). A 2007 DVD release by Digital Meme ran 100 minutes.)
- Country: Japan
- Language: Japanese

The Water Magician (滝の白糸, Taki no shiraito; lit. "White threads of the waterfall") is a 1933 Japanese silent drama film directed by Kenji Mizoguchi. It is based on the story of the same name by Kyōka Izumi.

== Plot ==
Tomo, called "Shiraito", is a "mizugei" (water arts presented by a performer) artist touring with a circus troupe based in Kanazawa. After an encounter with coachman Kinya, she falls in love with him and decides to finance his law studies, which he can't afford himself. Kinya takes up his studies in Tokyo, regularly receiving money with Shiraito's letters, who hopes that some day they will be reunited.

Two years later, the troupe has gone broke after the Winter season and the present audience being too small to pay for their expenses. As the troupe's bookkeeper, Shiraito gives the last money to young couple Nadeshiko and Shinzō to help them elope from the schemings of knife thrower Minami, who sold Nadeshiko to loan shark Iwabuchi. Shiraito goes to Iwabuchi herself and manages to borrow 300 yen from him in return for sexual services. On her way back, she is robbed by a group of men. As one of the men left behind a knife used by Minami in his act, she realises that the robbery was a set-up by Minami and Iwabuchi. She returns to Iwabuchi to confront him and, when he tries to rape her, stabs him to death. Seizing the money which Minami's men had taken from her, she escapes.

Shiraito flees to Tokyo to see Kinya once again, but he is not at home when she shows up at his address. When she is finally arrested and taken to court for murder in Kanazawa, the prosecutor sent from Tokyo is none other than Kinya. After he learns of the circumstances of the crime and that Shiraito had wanted the money for him, he offers to resign and stand in trial for her. Yet Shiraito insists that he does his duty, as his becoming a respected lawyer was all she had lived for in the past years. After her hearing in court, she commits suicide by biting off her tongue, and Kinya shoots himself with a pistol.

== Cast ==
- Irie Takako as Tomo Mizushima/Taki no shiraito
- Tokihiko Okada as Kinya Murakoshi
- Suzuko Taki as Nadeshiko
- Ichirō Sugai as Gozo Iwabuchi
- Kōju Murata as Minami
- Mimyo Bontarō as Shinzō
- Kumeko Urabe as Ogin
- Kōji Ōizumi as Gonji
- Minoru Ōhara as Tanjirō
- Nobuo Kosaka as Takamura
- Etsuji Oki as Old detective
- Kōji Kawase

== Background ==
The Water Magician was the second film adaptation (after 1915) of Kyōka Izumi's story, and one in a series of dramatisations of his work by director Mizoguchi. It was produced by Takako Irie's own production company, Irie Production, the first female star film production company. It premiered in Japan on 1 June 1933.

== Legacy ==
In his review for the online edition of Sight and Sound magazine, film scholar Alexander Jacoby called The Water Magician an "extraordinary" film, which "already reveals the director's skill with the camera" and benefits from actress Irie Takako's "magnetic performance".

The Water Magician is still occasionally being shown with live benshi narration by Midori Sawato, Ichirō Kataoka, Komura Tomoko, and others.
