= Nancy Walters =

American actress (1933–2009)

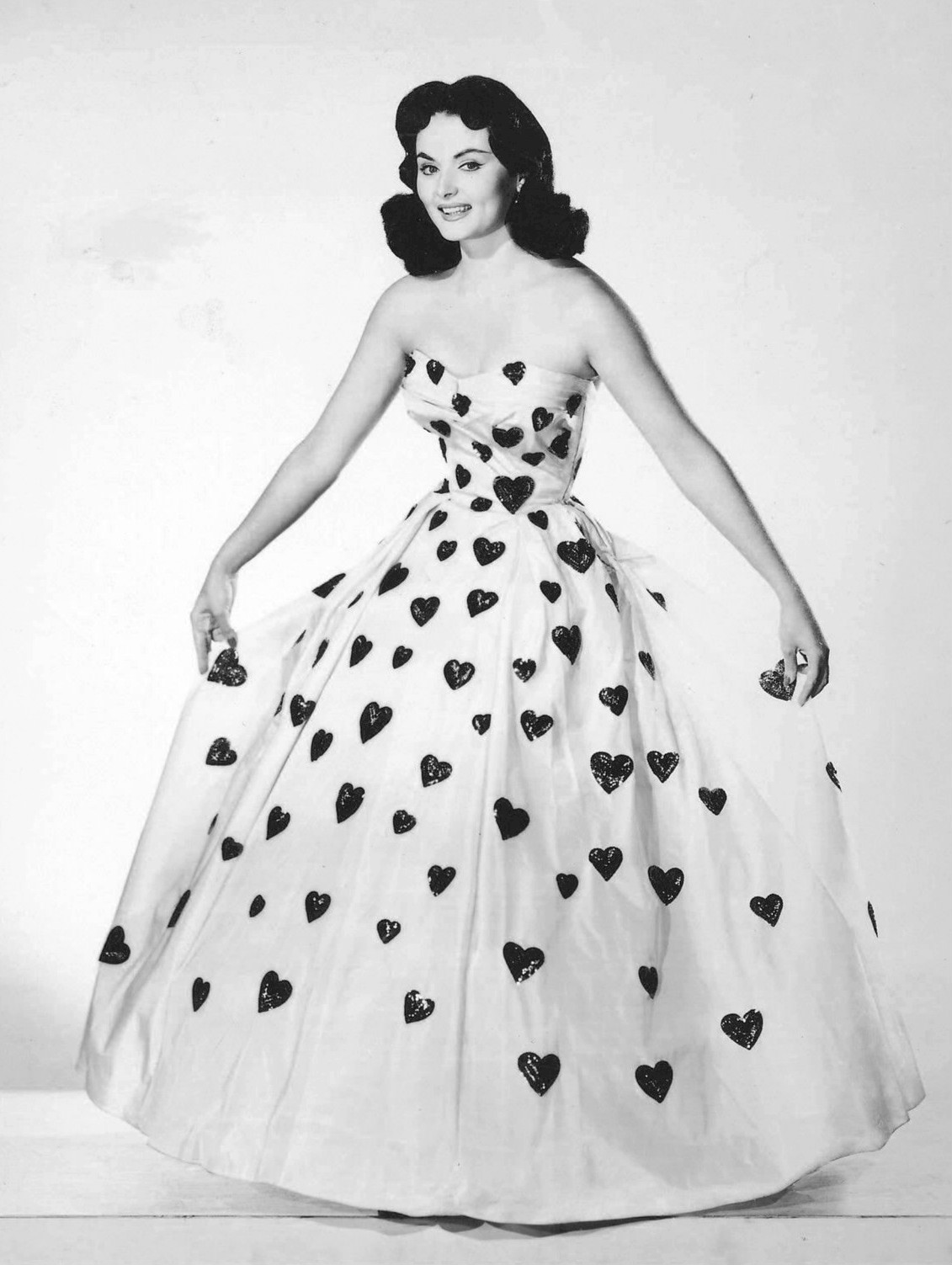
Walters on Strike It Rich in 1957

Nancy Walters (born Nancy Driver on June 26, 1933 – September 29, 2009) was an American model, actress and minister.

== Early years ==
Walters was born in Mount Plymouth, Florida, and brought up near Mount Plymouth and Zellwood, Florida. A bone infection that was incurred when she was four years old prevented her from standing until her teenage years. When she was seven years old, she spent eight months in a hospital for treatment of the infection. After she finished high school, she went to secretarial school and took a business law class, both of which were in line with her plans to be a lawyer's secretary.

== Career ==
Her career in modeling included appearances in the magazines Glamour, Vogue, Harper's Bazaar, and Mademoiselle.

In 1955 Walters left modeling and began working on the NBC game show The Big Payoff. In 1958 she was also on the CBS show Strike It Rich.

Walters was in productions at the Neighborhood Playhouse School of the Theatre. On Broadway, she performed as a singer in Ankles Aweigh (1955). A 1957 newspaper article described her as a protege of Bernie Wayne.

In 1960 Walters signed a film contract with Metro-Goldwyn-Mayer, with her first film for that studio being Bells Are Ringing (1960). She was in movies including Blue Hawaii, The Singing Nun and Monster on the Campus. Over the years she was a guest star on several television shows, including 77 Sunset Strip, Gunsmoke, The Monkees, and Get Smart. Her film and television career ended after 1967.

After her husband was killed in Vietnam, Walters joined an evangelical group. She became an ordained minister and was living in Las Vegas, Nevada when she died at the age of 76.

== Personal life ==
On March 10, 1962, Walters married Lt. Paul Warren Payne, a jet pilot in the U.S. Navy, in Las Vegas, Nevada.

== Recognition ==
Walters was one of 13 actresses selected as Deb Stars of 1958.

== Television ==
Year	Title	Role	Notes
1967	The Monkees	Assistant #1	S1:E24, "Monkees a la Mode"
