= Ryohei Arai (director) =

Japanese film director

Ryohei Arai (荒井良平, Arai Ryōhei) (22 October 1901 – 22 October 1980) was a Japanese film director. He directed films from the 1930s to 1950s, especially jidaigeki and ghost movies based on kaidan.

== Filmography ==
Ryohei Arai directed 47 films:

- Tsubanari Ronin (1939)
- Zoku Tsubanari Ronin (1940)
- Ghost-Cat of Arima Palace (Kaibyō Arima goten) (1953)
- Ghost of Saga Mansion (Kaidan Saga yashiki) (1953)
- (赤穂義士 Akō gishi) (1954)
