= Monster on the Campus =

1958 film by Jack Arnold

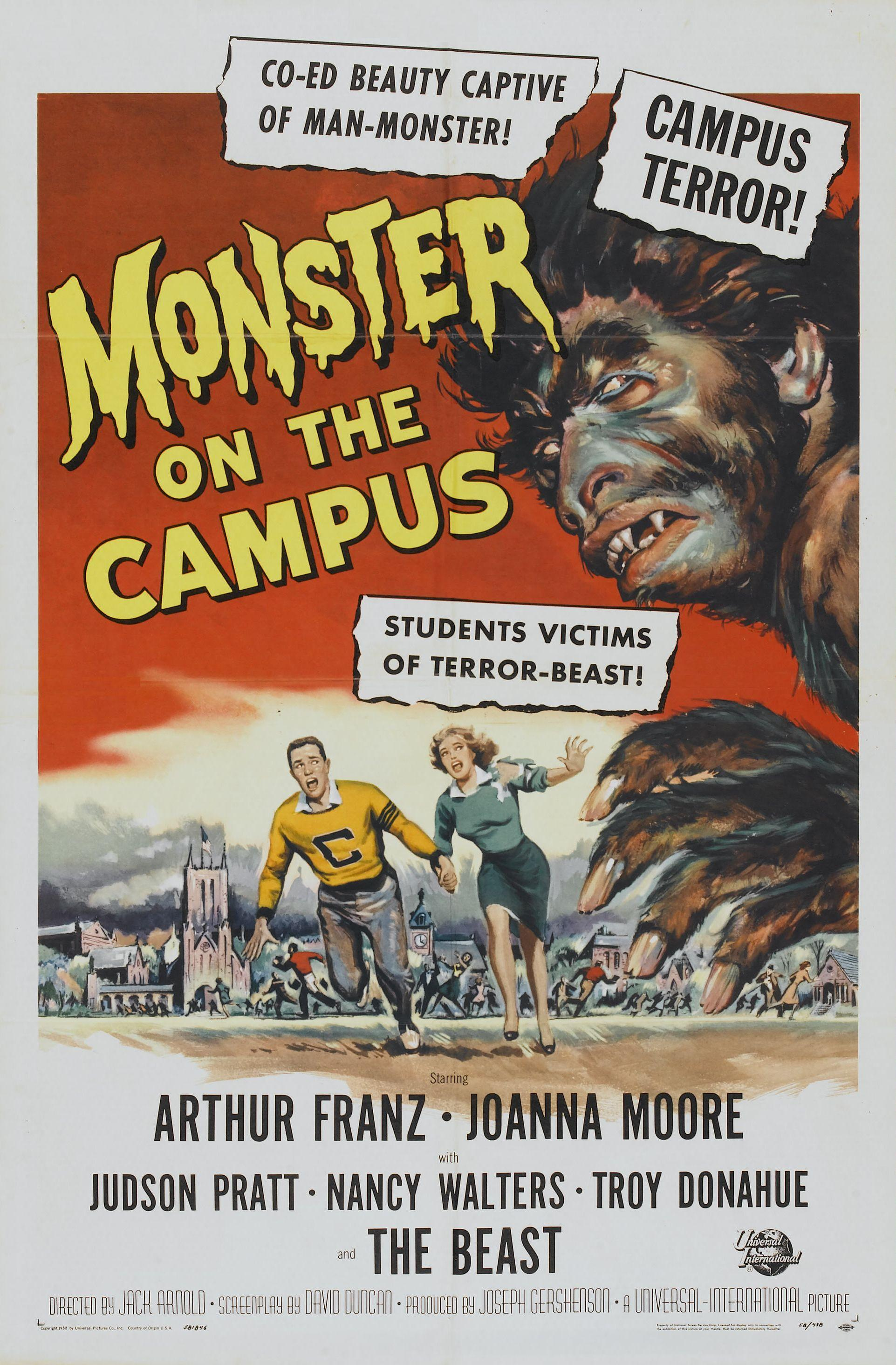
- Theatrical release poster by Reynold Brown
- Directed by: Jack Arnold
- Written by: David Duncan
- Produced by: Joseph Gershenson
- Starring: Arthur Franz; Joanna Cook Moore; Nancy Walters; Troy Donahue; Whit Bissell
- Cinematography: Russell Metty
- Edited by: Ted J. Kent
- Distributed by: Universal-International
- Release date: October 15, 1958
- Running time: 77 minutes
- Country: United States
- Language: English

Monster on the Campus is a 1958 American black-and-white horror film from Universal-International, produced by Joseph Gershenson, directed by Jack Arnold, from a script by David Duncan, that stars Arthur Franz, Joanna Cook Moore, Nancy Walters, Troy Donahue, and Whit Bissell. The film was theatrically released by Universal Pictures on October 15, 1958, at various cities across the United States.

The film's storyline tells of a university science professor who accidentally comes into contact with the irradiated blood of a coelacanth, which causes him to "regress" to being a primitive caveman.

== Plot ==
Dr. Donald Blake, a science professor at Dunsfield University, receives a coelacanth. A student, Jimmy, asks Blake if the fish is really a million years old. Blake replies, "It's the species that's old. No change in millions of years. See, the coelacanth is a living fossil, immune to the forces of evolution". Blake teaches his students that man is the only creature that can decide whether to evolve or devolve and that "unless we learn to control the instincts we've inherited from our ape-like ancestors, the race is doomed."

Inside the lab, Blake scratches himself on the teeth of the partially-thawed coelacanth, accidentally sticking his bloody hand into the water-filled container which held the fish. Molly Riordan, Dr. Cole Oliver's assistant, is present with Blake and offers him a ride home. Blake mentions he feels unwell and loses consciousness upon reaching Molly's car.

A person or persons unknown attacks Molly at Blake's home. Madeline Howard, Blake's fiancée and daughter of Dr. Gilbert Howard, president of the university, arrives and finds the home in shambles and Blake moaning on the ground. Madeline calls the police after seeing the corpse of Molly hanging by her hair in a tree.

Detective Lt. Mike Stevens and Detective Sgt. Eddie Daniels find a "deformed" handprint on a window and Blake's tie clasp in Molly's dead hand. They take Blake downtown when he admits that he cannot remember anything after getting into Molly's car.

Concluding that someone holding a grudge is trying to implicate Blake in Molly's murder, Stevens releases him. He assigns Daniels as Blake's bodyguard and tells Blake that Molly's autopsy showed she died of fright.

In his lab, Blake shoos away a dragonfly that lands on the coelacanth. The dragonfly later returns, now two feet in length. Blake and Jimmy try to catch the giant insect with a net when it lands on the coelacanth again. Blake stabs the dragonfly. While examining its body, he does not notice its blood has dripped into his pipe. Lighting up and smoking, he immediately feels ill. As the dragonfly shrinks back to its standard size, a large, hairy hand reaches out and squashes the insect. Then Blake's lab is trashed, and Sgt. Daniels is killed. The police find huge footprints near his body and conclude they are from the same source.

Blake learns that the coelacanth has blood plasma preserved by gamma rays. If it gets into the bloodstream of an animal or person, it causes them to revert to a more primitive state temporarily. He realizes that he might have received a dose of the irradiated plasma. If so, then Blake has been reverting to a troglodyte with large hands, feet, dark skin, heavy body hair, and prominent brow ridges.

He decides to take some days off at Dr. Howard's remote cabin. Blake plans to learn whether he is the beast. He rigs the cabin with cameras on trip wires and injects himself with coelacanth plasma. His caveman self wrecks the room, trips the camera's wires, and is photographed. He grabs an axe and leaves.

While driving to the cabin, Madeline runs off the road and crashes when the caveman appears in her headlights. A local forest ranger arrives and calls the Dunsfield police for help. The caveman carries the unconscious Madeline into the forest, with the ranger in pursuit.

Waking up, Madeline struggles with the beast. The ranger shoots the caveman when she breaks free. The caveman then kills the ranger with his axe and collapses. Blake, once again himself, returns to the cabin and develops a photo, showing it to Madeline.

Lt. Stevens, Detective Sgt. Powell and Dr. Howard arrive at the cabin. Blake tells them that he not only knows who the murderer is, but where to find him. Out in the woods, he explains to Howard what his experiment proved and injects himself with coelacanth plasma. Again transformed into the caveman, he chases Howard, forcing the two detectives to shoot him. As the beast lies dying, he slowly transforms back into Blake.

== Cast ==
- Arthur Franz as Dr. Donald Blake
- Joanna Moore as Madeline Howard
- Judson Pratt as Lt. Mike Stevens
- Nancy Walters as Sylvia Lockwood
- Troy Donahue as Jimmy Flanders
- Phil Harvey as Sgt. Powell
- Helen Westcott as Nurse Molly Riordan
- Alexander Lockwood as Dr. Gilbert Howard
- Whit Bissell as Dr. Oliver Cole
- Ross Elliott as Sgt. Eddie Daniels
- Anne Anderson as Student (uncredited)
- Louis Cavalier as Student (uncredited)
- Richard H. Cutting as Forest Ranger Tom Edwards (uncredited)
- Hank Patterson as Night Watchman Mr. Townsend (uncredited)
- Ronnie Rondell Jr. as Student (uncredited)
- Eddie Parker as the Monster (uncredited)

== Production ==
Production took place between April and May 1958. The on-campus scenes of Dunsfield University were filmed at Occidental College in Eagle Rock, a suburb of Los Angeles, California.

The working title of the film was Monster in the Night. Although Universal music director Joseph Gershenson had received executive producer credit on some films of the 1940s, Monster on the Campus marked the first film for which he received sole credit as producer. This was the film debut of Nancy Walters. Arthur Franz only played Prof. Donald Blake. Once the makeup transformation scenes were over, stuntman Eddie Parker did every scene as the monster.

Science fiction film critic Bill Warren writes that director Jack Arnold said in an interview with Cinefastastique magazine (Vol.4 No.2, 1975) that the film was shot in 12 days, and that Arnold told Photon magazine (No.26, 1975), "I didn't really hate it, but I didn't think it was up to the standards of the other films that I have done".

== Reception ==
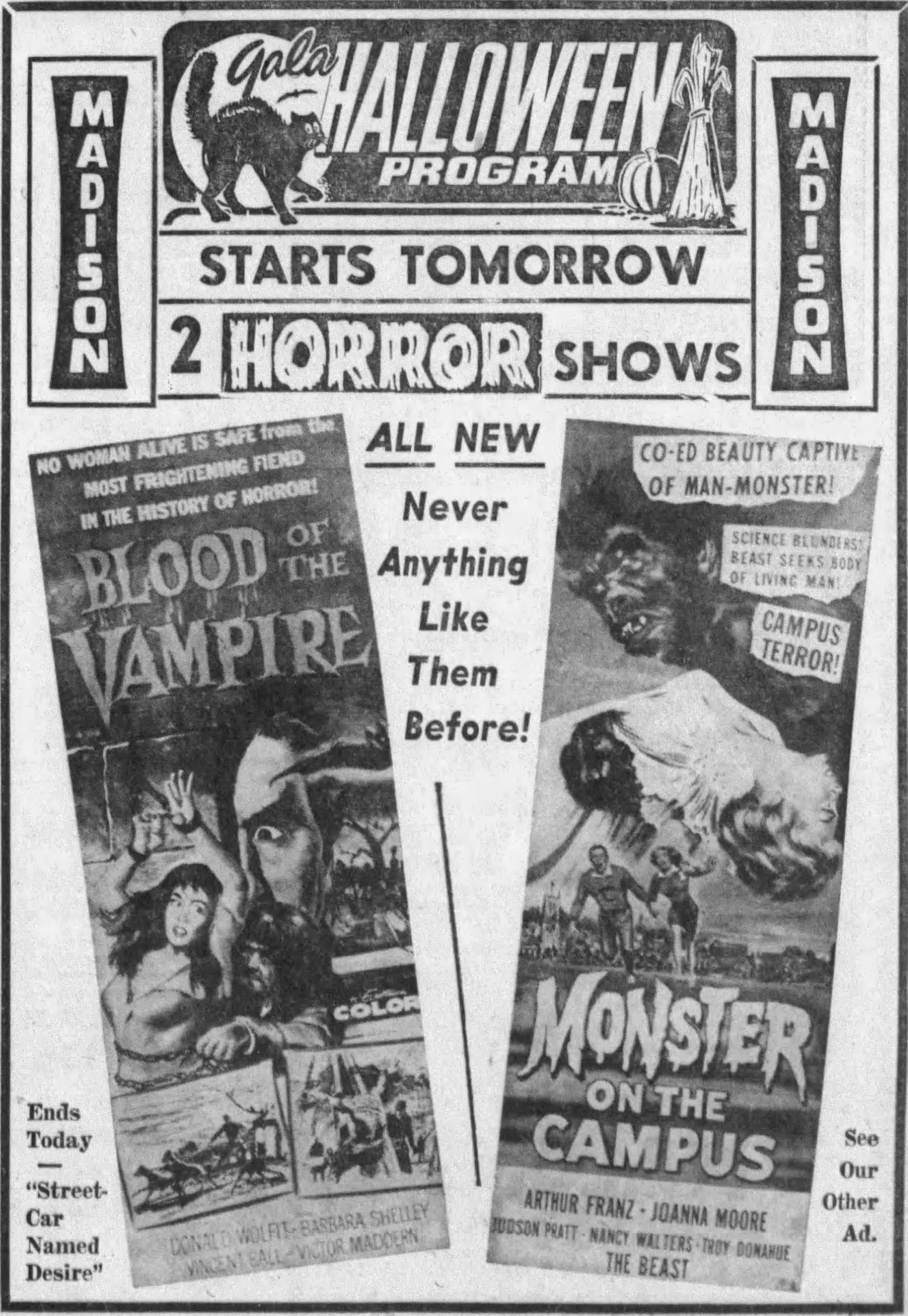
Advertisement from 1958 for Monster on the Campus and co-feature, Blood of the Vampire

Universal Pictures planned to show two films on Halloween across the United States in 1958: Monster on the Campus and Blood of the Vampire. Earlier screenings occurred across the United States on October 15, 1958, such as Riverside, California and in Hoopeston Illinois.

In the UK, it was given an "X" certificate by the British Board of Film Censors (BBFC), which meant at the time that the film could not be exhibited to people under age 16. In 2016, BBFC reclassified the DVD of Monster on the Campus. It now has a PG rating.

According to Warren, there were few reviews of Monster on the Campus when it first came out because it was the "bottom half of a double-bill with the more colorful Blood of the Vampire". He quotes a few contemporary reviews. It was called "'a pretty fair shocker'" in Daily Variety. Jack Moffitt, in The Hollywood Reporter, said the film emphasized the "'human rather than the monstrous side of this modern 'Dr. Jekyll' story". The Monthly Film Reporter, however, called it "'depressing,'" even though it had been "'tailored for the horror market.'"

BoxOffice magazine in its issue of 19 January 1959 showed positive reviews from most of the publications listed in its "Review Digest". BoxOffice, Film Daily, and The Hollywood Reporter all rated it as "very good"; Harrison's Report and Variety rated it "good"; Parents' Magazine gave it a "fair" rating; and the New York Daily News had not reviewed the film.

The reviewing division of the Catholic News Service evaluated Monster on the Campus in 1958 for its "artistic merit and moral suitability". This resulted in The United States Conference of Catholic Bishops (USCCB) giving the film a rating of "A-III," which meant it was suitable for adults, although USCCB cautioned that it contained "stylized violence with some intense menace".

Many of the more recent reviews have centered on the monster/caveman/ape-man makeup. Warren writes, "The mask is unconvincing, with tiny shell-like teeth and a built-in scowl; it resembles similar Universal-International over-the-head masks of the period, as seen in Abbott and Costello Meet Dr. Jekyll and Mr. Hyde, Tarantula and other outings". Bryan Senn notes that keeping the monster off-camera until near the end of the film is a good idea, as it adds a "bit of build-up and mystery", but doing so "only makes the rubbery mask and hirsute padded shoulders (making him look like a simian linebacker) that much more disappointing when finally revealed".

But reviews have noted more than just makeup. Phil Hardy writes that "cinematographer [Russell] Metty and special effects man [Clifford] Stine make the most of the ape-man's path of destruction through the campus but the script lacks any sparkle". Senn calls the film "visually flat, with the 'action' taking place in labs, offices and cabins, and with exteriors consisting of one back-lot hillside". And Warren says that the film is "hampered by trivial locations and drab sets. The film has no arresting images. The best [Arnold] can come up with is a swift glance the ape-man gives a mirror before smashing it and one shot of a woman dangling by her hair from a tree". In summary, he calls the film "routine, unimaginative and foolish ... Jack Arnold's worst science fiction film".

But not every reviewer disliked Monster on the Campus. Critic Ken Hanke wrote that "part of the charm of this little movie is that the monster is so hokey. No, it's not classic horror, but it's a good bit of fun". He gave the film a score of 4.5 out of 5 stars.

== Academic interest ==
Monster on the Campus has attracted a fair amount of academic interest. Prof. Cyndy Hendershot in 2001 wrote that the film examines "issues of conformity and individuality" through a "metaphor of monstrous transformation". Hendershot says that while Blake the professor represents conformity, his caveman self is a representation of individuality. But he cannot be conformist and individualistic at the same time. His employer, Dunsfield University, "conspires to stamp out individuality that does not follow the direction of the organization as a whole". That is, "while Monster on the Campus adopts the typical sf/horror plot of the mad scientist versus the blind authorities", the film "frames the issue specifically within the world of the organization man". According to Hendershot, a man such as Blake - driven from within toward individualism and not at all a good organization man who willingly submits to conformity imposed on him from the outside - cannot win. His personal goal of knowledge for the sake of knowledge is not that of the university, which seems more interested in the publicity that owning a rare coelacanth will bring. "But, if the film condemns the other-directed society as stifling scientific knowledge, it equally condemns Blake's rampant inner-directed man. It reveals, in fact, that the individual within is a beast".

Also in 2001, Hendershot looked at Monster on the Campus as an exploration of a "wide variety of issues related to the emergence of teen culture in Fifties America". Specifically, her focus is on juvenile deliquency, which she says "provoked feelings of intense horror" in adults at the time. The Dunsfield Police, for example, "suspect the teenagers on campus of being guilty" of the murders of Molly and Daniels, yet the "true criminal is located at the heart of adult authority on campus". However, unlike many films in which young people are the villains, Monster on the Campus inverts things, so that "only the students emerge as having any clear moral sense about the horrors that are occurring on campus". In other words, "the kids in Monster on the Campus are fine; it's the adults that have to be watched, as they may transform into monsters at any moment".

Prof. Patrick Gonder looks at the film in racial terms. He writes that Monster on the Campus was released just a few years after the 1954 US Supreme Court decision in Brown v. Board of Education. In that light, he says, "the monster on the campus is the demonized black male student, threatening to contaminate the purity of white women and cause the reversal of white evolutionary potential. The Caveman is imaged as a racist caricature of the African American: bestial, violent and corrosive to the tenets of white society". However, Gonder goes on to point out that the "creature and the professor are one and the same: several times, Blake comments on how the beast is 'within' him". And at the end of the film Blake solves his problem: he "does not turn himself in but instead organizes his own lynch mob by purposefully (for the first time) transforming himself into the Caveman, thus forcing the police officers to shoot him".

== Home media ==
Monster on the Campus had its U.S. VHS release in 1994. Universal Pictures released Monster on the Campus as part of a DVD boxed set called The Classic Sci-Fi Ultimate Collection, which features four other Universal films: The Incredible Shrinking Man, The Mole People, The Monolith Monsters, and Tarantula. Shout Factory released the film on Blu-ray in a package including the trailer and subtitles on 25 June 2019.

== Popular culture ==
Monster on the Campus has been referenced in a number of other films and television programs. Among other examples, it was shown on Svengoolie in 1981 and 2013; scenes from it were used in the films Eternal Sunshine of the Spotless Mind (2004) and American Grindhouse (2010); and it was mentioned in the Canadian comedy Ding et Dong le film (1990).

In music, The Modern Airline, a neo-New Wave band from Brooklyn, New York, released a song titled "Monster on the Campus" in 2017.
