= Tom Graeff =

American actor and film director (1929–1970)

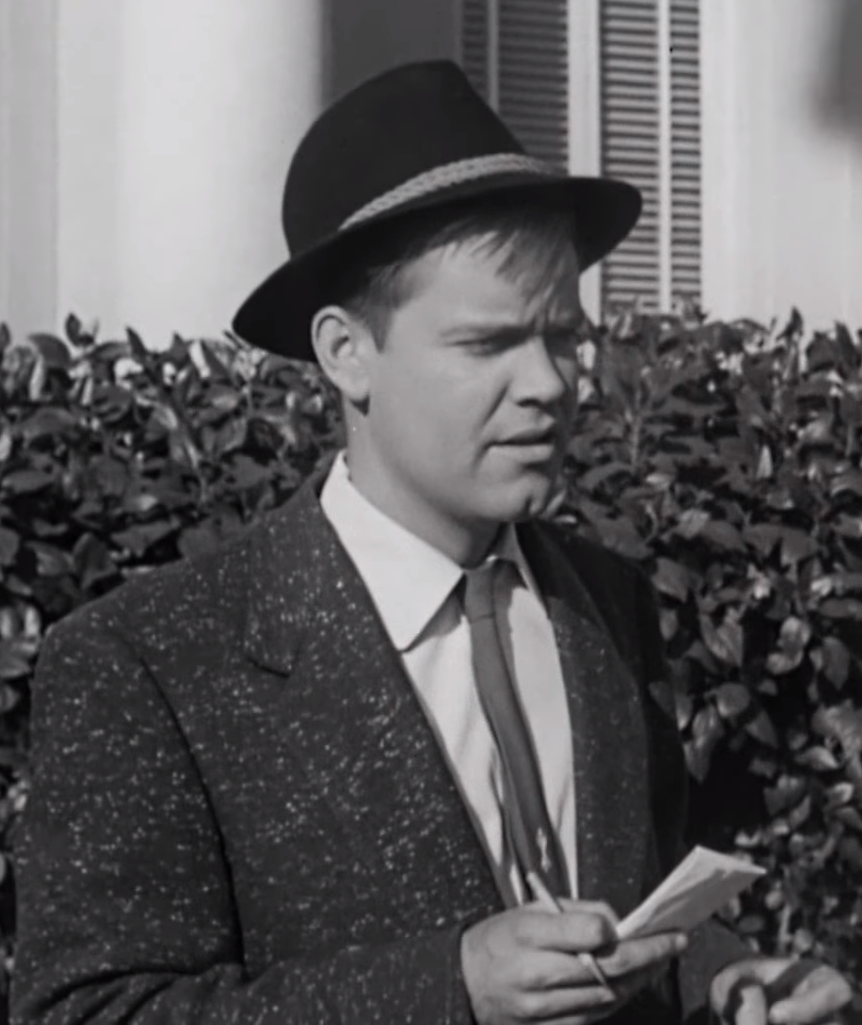
- Tom Graeff as Joe Rogers in Teenagers from Outer Space (1959)
- Born: Thomas Lockyear Graeff; September 12, 1929; Ray, Arizona, US
- Died: December 19, 1970 (aged 41); La Mesa, California, US
- Other names: Tom Lockyear; Jesus Christ II
- Education: UCLA
- Occupations: Actor, director, producer, screenwriter, film editor, cinematographer
- Years active: 1951–1964

Thomas Lockyear Graeff (September 12, 1929 – December 19, 1970) was an American actor, film director, producer, screenwriter, film editor and cinematographer. He is best known for writing, directing, producing and starring in the 1959 B-movie Teenagers from Outer Space.

== Early life ==
Graeff was born in Ray, Arizona, to an engineer father and homemaker mother. When he was a toddler, the family relocated to Los Angeles, where a second son was born. As a teen, Graeff enrolled in the UCLA Theater Arts Program, where he studied film making and theater.

== Film career ==
Graeff's first publicly screened film was a 20-minute short about Delta Chi fraternity life entitled Toast to Our Brother, which starred Graeff, a Paramount ingenue named Judith Ames (later Rachel Ames), and guest-starred comedian Joe E. Brown (Some Like It Hot), a UCLA alumnus. The film premiered at the Fox Village Theater in Westwood Village during Graeff's senior year at college.

Graeff's next film was a 16-minute recruiting film for Orange Coast College in Costa Mesa, California. The Orange Coast College Story was narrated by Vincent Price, who was a friend of the faculty adviser, and starred a young actor named Chuck Roberts (a.k.a. Charles Robert Kaltenthaler). It premiered on campus in spring of 1954.

Graeff began production on his first feature, The Noble Experiment, in the summer of 1954. The comedy, shot in Orange County, took a year to complete and premiered in Newport Beach, California, in August 1955. Graeff played the lead opposite Phyllis Yarwood. The film was not well received by the audience and was only shown once more, years later. Around this time, Graeff also produced a short art film, Island Sunrise, starring Chuck Roberts.

=== Teenagers from Outer Space ===
Teenagers from Outer Space (full movie, public domain)

In 1956, Graeff was hired as Roger Corman's assistant on Not of This Earth. He also played a small role. When filming wrapped, Graeff decided to pen a science-fiction feature of his own and look for funding. Securing a modest budget from actor Gene Sterling, Graeff placed an ad in The Hollywood Reporter looking for more investors. The ad was answered by British actor Bryan Pearson (stage name Bryan Grant), who put up $5,000 in exchange for playing the villain, Thor, and casting his wife Ursula Pearson in a small role.

Filmed entirely on location in Hollywood in the fall of 1956 and winter of 1957, the low-budget film went through several titles before it was released by Warner Brothers in June 1959. Though the film was profitable, Graeff and his investors saw no money from the release. Bryan Pearson eventually sued Graeff to get his original investment back.

Teenagers appeared as the lower part of a double bill alongside Godzilla Raids Again, released under the title Gigantis the Fire Monster, and was shown largely at drive-in theaters throughout the country. Critics were not kind to the film, though Graeff was applauded in some publications as a director with talent and a creative approach to a minimal budget.

== Later years and death ==
In 1959, Graeff placed an ad in the Los Angeles Times proclaiming that he was to be called Jesus Christ II, and that God had shown him truth and love. A second ad appeared on Christmas Day and listed several sermon dates at local churches. That ad was quickly pulled from rotation. The next year, Graeff filed to have his name legally changed to Jesus Christ II. After opposition by the Christian Defense League, the petition was denied.

After this incident and a subsequent arrest for disrupting a church service, Graeff vanished from Hollywood, fleeing to the east coast. He returned to Los Angeles in 1964 and worked as an editor on David L. Hewitt's 1964 ultra low-budget film The Wizard of Mars. It was his final film credit. In 1968, Graeff took out an ad in Variety, announcing that his screenplay, entitled Orf, was for sale for the unprecedented sum of $500,000. (A Hollywood record had recently been set when a script was sold for $400,000.) After the ad appeared, he was publicly lambasted by LA Times columnist Joyce Haber. When Graeff insinuated that a number of high-profile people were attached to the project (including Robert Wise and Carl Reiner), Haber outed him as "Jesus Christ II", putting the final nail in his career.

Unable to find work, Graeff moved to La Mesa, California, near San Diego. He committed suicide by carbon monoxide poisoning in his garage on December 19, 1970, at age 41.

== Legacy ==
In a 1993 edition of Scarlet Street magazine. an article by Richard Valley and Jessie Lilley featured interviews with Bryan and Ursula Pearson, who revealed that Graeff and David Love/Chuck Roberts were romantically involved. For over 25 years, major publications, including Leonard Maltin's movie guide, had erroneously written that Love and Graeff were the same person. Shortly after the article appeared, fans dubbed Graeff the gay Ed Wood.

The Graeff/Love confusion was the first of many Teenagers from Outer Space rumors that made their way onto the Internet. For example, sites like IMDb reported as late as 2006 that Dawn Bender had died from alcohol poisoning, despite the fact that, at present, she is alive and well.

In the early 1960s, Teenagers was sold to television, where it played frequently for the next thirty years, noted for its infamous raygun that turned living things into instant skeletons, an original effect that showed up again in Tim Burton's film Mars Attacks!. It was featured in the movie-spoofing television series Mystery Science Theater 3000 (season 4, episode 4), and was included on their Volume 6 DVD box set. The movie was included as an extra on the 2005 PS2 video game Destroy All Humans!

Graeff is also the subject of several media projects, including a biography called Smacks of Brilliance, and a documentary entitled The Boy from Out of This World.

== Filmography ==
| Year | Title | Role | Notes |
|---|---|---|---|
| 1951 | Toast to Our Brother | | Writer, Director, Producer |
| 1954 | Orange Coast College Story | | Director, Cinematographer, Editor |
| 1954 | Island Sunrise | | Writer, Director, Cinematographer, Editor |
| 1955 | The Noble Experiment | | Writer, Director, Editor |
| 1956 | Not of This Earth | Car Park Attendant | Assistant to director |
| 1959 | Teenagers from Outer Space | Joe Rogers | Writer, Director, Producer, Cinematographer, Editor |
| 1964 | The Wizard of Mars | | Editor |
