= Ghost of Saga Mansion =

1953 film by Ryohei Arai

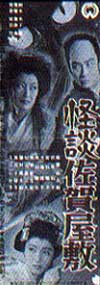
- Japanese movie poster
- Directed by: Ryohei Arai
- Written by: Tōkichi Kinoshita
- Produced by: Masaichi Nagata
- Starring: Takako Irie; Kotaro Bando
- Music by: Nakaba Takahashi
- Production company: Daiei Film
- Release date: September 3, 1953
- Running time: 97 minutes
- Country: Japan
- Language: Japanese

Ghost of Saga Mansion (怪談佐賀屋敷, Kaidan Saga yashiki) is a 1953 Japanese horror film directed by Ryohei Arai. It was filmed in Black and White, in academy ratio format (full screen). It was never dubbed in English, nor shown in the United States theatrically.

== Cast ==
- Kōtarō Bandō
- Kunitarō Sawamura
- Shōsaku Sugiyama
- Shintarō Nanjō
- Takako Irie
- Kazuko Fushimi
- Yōko Wakasugi

== Release ==
The film was released theatrically in Japan on September 3, 1953, by Daiei Film and on DVD in July 2004.
