= Ghost-Cat of Gojusan-Tsugi =

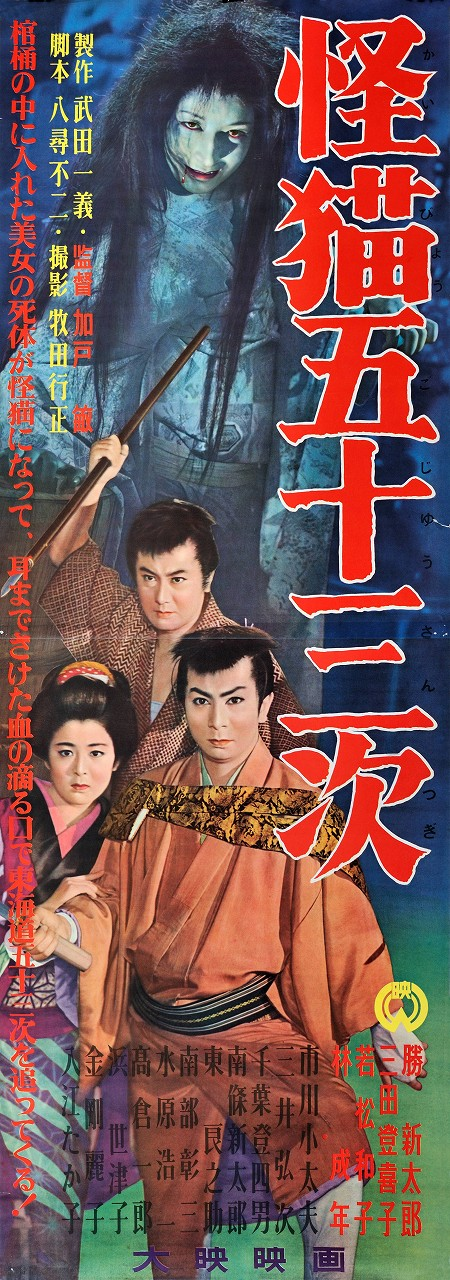
- Theatrical release poster
- Directed by: Bin Kato
- Written by: Fuji Yahiro
- Produced by: Kazuyoshi Takeda; Masaichi Nagata
- Starring: Shintaro Katsu; Tokiko Mita
- Cinematography: Yukimasa Makita
- Distributed by: Daiei Film
- Release date: 19 July 1956 (Japan)
- Running time: 87 minutes
- Country: Japan
- Language: Japanese

Ghost-Cat of Gojusan-Tsugi (Japanese: 怪猫五十三次, Hepburn: Kaibyo Gojusan-tsugi) is a 1956 Japanese horror film directed by Bin Kato and produced by Daiei Film. It was filmed in black-and-white in the Academy ratio format.

== Plot ==
Set along the historic Tōkaidō road, the narrative follows a power struggle in the fief of Okazaki, leading to the death of Namiji, a nobleman's daughter. Her fiancé seeks revenge, aided by Namiji's cat, which plays a pivotal role in confronting the perpetrators.

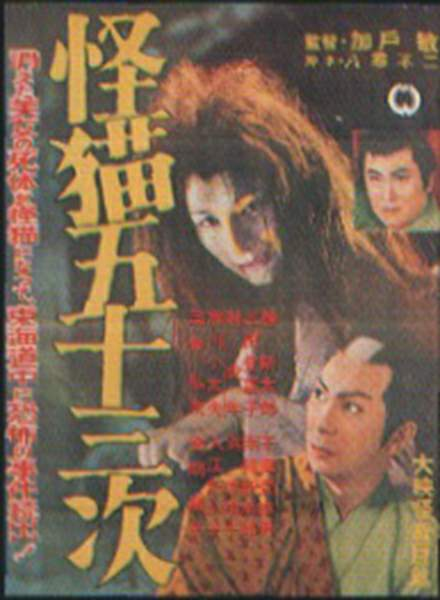
Japanese theatrical release poster

== Cast ==
- Shintarō Katsu as Minami Sanjirō
- Takako Irie
- Kōji Mitsui
- Toshio Chiba
- Shintarō Nanjō
- Setsuko Hama
- Kazuko Wakamatsu
- Naritoshi Hayashi
- Kodayu Ichikawa

== Production ==
Filming commenced in February 1956 and concluded in June of the same year.

== Availability ==
The film has been made available on DVD with English subtitles.

== See also ==
- Japanese horror
