= Ghost-Cat Wall of Hatred =

- Film poster
- Directed by: Kenji Misumi
- Written by: Shigeo Okamoto; Toshio Tamikado
- Music by: Nakaba Takahashi
- Production company: Daiei Film
- Release date: June 15, 1958 (Japan)
- Running time: 88 minutes
- Country: Japan
- Language: Japanese

Ghost-Cat Wall of Hatred (Japanese: 怪猫呪いの壁, Hepburn: Kaibyo noroi no kabe), also known as The Ghost-Cat Cursed Wall, is a 1958 black and white Japanese horror film directed by Kenji Misumi for Daiei Film.

== Plot ==
When Lord Maeda loses his wife Lady Maeda, his retainer Tadokoro and lady-in-waiting Satsuki try to get him interested in their protege Natsue. But Maeda has taken an interest in Shino, the woman who cares for his little son Nobuchiyo, and protects his dead wife's black cat. Shino confides in her brother Takeuchi, a fencing teacher, that Maeda has asked her to marry him. He advises her to marry Maeda. When she objects, he tells her she must then be honest. Shino and the man she is in love with, Atsumi, meet secretly in a mausoleum and decide to tell Lord Maeda they wish to marry. Men led by Tadokoro and Satsuki attack them there, and Shino is killed. When they entomb her in a wall of the mausoleum, they also bury the black cat behind the wall with her body. A cat's shadow begins to appear on the mausoleum wall, catlike noises are heard, and Satsuki falls ill. Painting over the wall has no effect; the cat's shadow just reappears. Maeda sleeps with Natsue. The ghost cat attacks her. The conspirators persuade Maeda to bring in a priest to exorcise the ghost, but they actually want him to cast a spell on Nobuchiyo to make him die, ensuring the succession of the child Natsue is going to have. Shino's ghost in human guise seduces Satsuki. The ghost cat chases Gendo across the roof. Tadokoro accidentally kills Satsuki while trying to escape. He and the chief steward try to kill Maeda again, but Takeuchi saves him. At last Maeda understands they are after him and he asks Takeuchi if he can bury his sister's body in the Maeda family crypt.

== Cast ==
- Shintaro Katsu
- Yōko Uraji
- Mieko Kondo
- Chieko Murata
- Yōichi Funaki
- Akio Kobori
