= Beverly Tyler filmography =

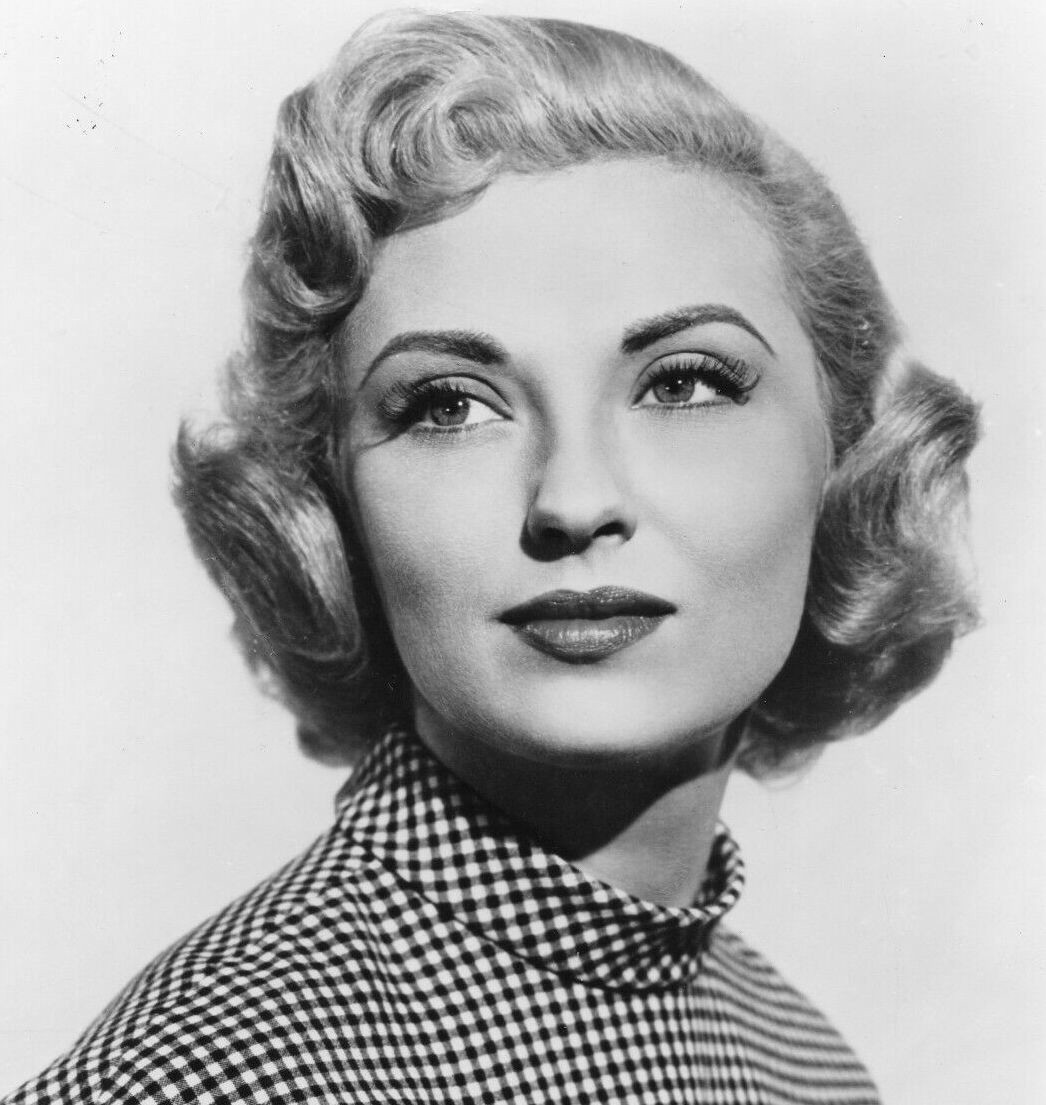
Tyler in the 1950s

This is the complete filmography of actress Beverly Tyler (July 5, 1927 – November 23, 2005).

== Film and television appearances ==
- 1961 Hazel - Phyllis Burkett - Everybody's Thankful But Us Turkeys
- 1961 The Andy Griffith Show - Gladys 'Melissa' Stevens - Barney on the Rebound
- 1961 Bonanza - Mary - Vengeance
- 1960 Shotgun Slade - Peaches - Sudden Death
- 1960 Tightrope - Valerie Harper - Park Avenue Story
- 1959 Tales of Wells Fargo - Polly - Wanted: Jim Hardie
- 1958-1959 The Lineup - Various Roles
- 1959 Colonel Humphrey Flack - Peggy - Spaceship Ahoy
- 1959 Mike Hammer - The Last Aloha
- 1958 Bronco - Irene Lang - Quest of the Thirty Dead
- 1958 Hong Kong Confidential - Fay Wells
- 1958 The Toughest Gun in Tombstone - Della Cooper
- 1957 Chicago Confidential - Sylvia Clarkson
- 1957 Voodoo Island - Sarah Adams
- 1956 The Ford Television Theatre - Binnie Hughes - Lady in His Life
- 1956 Death Valley Days - Evelyn Neilson - Escape
- 1956 Damon Runyon Theater - Flower Brothertop - The Face of Johnny Dolliver
- 1955 Climax! - The Bigger They Come
- 1954 Shower of Stars - Lend an Ear
- 1954 Big Town - Lorelei Kilbourne
- 1954 Fireside Theatre - Beyond the Cross
- 1953 Schlitz Playhouse - The Girl That I Married
- 1952 Night Without Sleep - Singer (uncredited)
- 1952 Dangerous Assignment - Safiye - The Assassin Ring Story
- 1952 The Battle at Apache Pass - Mary Kearney
- 1952 The Cimarron Kid - Carrie Roberts
- 1951 The Bigelow Theatre - His Brother's Keeper
- 1950 Musical Comedy Time - Sally Morgan - Whoopee
- 1950 The Fireball - Mary Reeves
- 1950 The Palomino - Maria Guevara
- 1950 The Silver Theatre - My Brother's Keeper
- 1950 Cavalcade of Stars - Herself
- 1947 The Beginning or the End - Anne Cochran
- 1947 My Brother Talks to Horses - Martha Sterling
- 1946 The Green Years - Alison Keith as a Young Woman
- 1944 Bathing Beauty - Co-Ed (uncredited)
- 1943 Best Foot Forward - Miss Delaware Water Gap, Vocalist
- 1943 The Youngest Profession - Thyra Winter (Credited as Beverly Jean Saul)
