= Creature Features =

Genre of TV format shows

- Creature Features
- Genre: Horror/Science fiction
- Presented by: Various
- Country of origin: United States

Production
- Production location: various
- Running time: 2–3 hours

Related
- Chiller Theatre, Fright Night, Creature Double Feature

Creature Features is a program of horror shows broadcast on local American television stations throughout the 1960s, 1970s, and 1980s. The movies broadcast on these shows were generally classic and cult horror movies of the 1930s to 1950s, the horror and science-fiction films of the 1950s, British horror films of the 1960s, and the Japanese kaiju "giant monster" movies of the 1950s to 1970s.

== Screen Gems ==
In October 1957, Screen Gems released a bundle of old Universal horror movies to syndicated television, naming the collection "Shock!". They encouraged the use of hosts for the broadcasts. This is why many of the early programs were called "Shock Theater". Viewers loved the package, as well as the concept, and ratings soared. A "Son of Shock!" package was released in 1958.

Creature Features was another film package that was released in the early 1960s and added to in the 1970s. The films in this package ranged from horror and science-fiction films of the 1950s, British horror films of the 1960s, and the Japanese "giant monster" movies of the 1960s, and 1970s. This package also included an uncut print of Night of the Living Dead

== The movies ==
Creature Features normally showed all the classic Universal Horror movies from the 1930s and 1940s, such as Dracula, Frankenstein, and others. Several old RKO films such as King Kong, Son of Kong, and the original Mighty Joe Young were also included. They aired all the movies produced and distributed by American International Pictures, including all the Roger Corman B-movies of the 1950s and 1960s such as The Raven and The Terror, plus most of the Japanese "monster movies" produced by Toho Studios, and Daiei Motion Picture Company (famous for the Gamera movies).

They broadcast all the best British horror films by Hammer Film Productions, such as The Curse of Frankenstein, Dracula: Prince of Darkness, The Phantom of the Opera, The Curse of the Werewolf, and The Hound of the Baskervilles. Later, during the 1970s, the films of Amicus Productions and Tigon British Film Productions, which included Dr. Terror's House of Horrors and The House That Dripped Blood, became popular features on the shows.

Creature Features also aired many "nuclear monster" and "space alien" science fiction movies. Created in the 1950s, these movies generally featured giant mutant monsters or aliens from outer space terrorizing Earth. These included Attack of the 50 Foot Woman, The Amazing Colossal Man, Them!, Tarantula, The Thing from Another World, It Came from Outer Space, The War of the Worlds, and Forbidden Planet.

== Air times ==
Creature Features usually aired on Friday or Saturday night, around eight or nine o'clock. In some cities it aired on Saturday afternoons alternating with Kung Fu Theater and/or Bikini Theater. Because it aired after the traditional Saturday morning cartoon time block, it introduced many teenagers to classic monster movies.

== Later history ==
TV horror shows of this sort became more scarce during the early and mid-1980s, partly because acquiring broadcast rights for these films became considerably more expensive in the new era of cable television. Another reason for the decline of these shows is the change in Friday and Saturday night viewer demographics, as young people are decreasingly likely to stay home on those nights. Or, if home, unlikely to watch broadcast television, being more likely to be gaming or engaged in social media.

== Broadcast cities (US) ==
=== Metropolitan Areas ===
These are the major metropolitan areas of the United States in which Creature Features was seen:

- Northeast
  - New York Metropolitan Area
    - WNEW
  - Baltimore-Washington Metropolitan Area
  - Greater Boston Area
  - Philadelphia metropolitan area
- South
  - Louisville
- North Carolina channel 6 every Friday night at midnight
  - Nashville
  - Tampa Bay Area
  - South Florida
  - New Orleans, LA
- Midwest
  - Detroit metropolitan area
  - Chicago Metropolitan Area
  - Cape Girardeau, Missouri
  - Saint Louis, Missouri
  - Kansas City Metropolitan Area
  - Omaha Metropolitan Area
  - Quad Cities
  - South Bend Metro Area
- West Coast
  - San Francisco Bay Area
    - KTVU
    - KOFY
  - Los Angeles

=== 1968, WQAD-Channel 8 (Quad Cities) ===
Creature Feature was also the name of a horror program broadcast on WQAD-TV in the Quad City area. From 1968 until 1977 it was hosted by a local business man named Chuck Acri, sponsored by Acri's home improvement business. ("Acri" rhymes with "BAKE-ree").

In addition to Acri's signature greeting, "Hi, Chuck Acri here!", and pitches for his company's products, some intermissions featured a comical Dracula imitator called "Vincent Hedges" (played by actor Ken Gibson) along with other actors playing classic movie monsters. The short filmed segments were produced as silent movie skits, underscored by an instrumental version of "The Windmills of Your Mind".

Acri marketed and distributed the program from the Quad Cities, including Milan, Illinois, to Cedar Rapids, Iowa (KCRG) to Peoria (WEEK) and Springfield (WICS), Illinois. Acri's Creature Feature may have had the widest distribution of a local, hosted TV horror movie program in the U.S.

=== 1968, WSJV-Channel 28 (South Bend, Indiana) ===
Creature Features was also the name of a horror show which aired on Saturday nights in the South Bend Metro Area on WSJV-TV Channel 28, from 1968 till 1977. The show featured artwork of 4–6 monster heads on a blue background used during announcements, or another watercolor of a black castle on a long winding road in the moonlight. It was mentioned in a letter from Joseph Meeks in issue #10 (March 1994) of Scary Monsters.

It also played as "Double Creature Feature" and featured the bug-eyed monster from Frankenstein Meets the Space Monster (1966) in the title card.

=== 1969, WNEW-Channel 5 (New York City) ===
Creature Features was broadcast in the New York Metropolitan Area, on WNEW, Channel 5 (Metromedia Broadcasting). It was hosted by Lou Steele (The Creep), who became familiar to Channel 5 viewers as the guy who started off the 10 o'clock News by asking: "It's 10 p.m.; do you know where your children are?"

Creature Features first aired from July to August 1969 on a test run, and was found to be a hit. It was continued on the air from November 1969 to August 1973, but was cancelled due to poor ratings and competition from WPIX's Chiller Theatre. Over the next six years the show would be rebroadcast periodically, but never with great success. It was re-broadcast in 1979–1980, but cut again due to poor ratings.

=== 1970, WGN-Channel 9 and WFLD-Channel 32 (Chicago) ===
Creature Features was introduced into the Chicago metropolitan area on Chicago's WGN Channel 9 in the fall of 1970. Hosted by Carl Greyson, and later Marty McNeeley, this version of Creature Features ran until 1976. The show used the theme music of Henry Mancini's Experiment in Terror. After WGN canceled its version, WFLD Channel 32 briefly used the title (sans 's' – it was called "Creature Feature") for its own weekend screenings of horror movies; no host appeared on the WFLD version. This show ended with the premiere of Son of Svengoolie in 1979.

=== 1970, KDNL-Channel 30 (Saint Louis) ===
Baron Von Crypt's Shock Theater aired on KDNL TV Channel 30 in St. Louis Missouri from 1970 to 1971. with a refilmed reboot in 1976. KDNL's Shock Theater hosted by a campy vampire named Baron Von Crypt and his side kick Igor. Each week Shock Theater brought St. Louis its share of late night screams. Showing films by Vincent Price, Bela Lugosi, Lon Chaney, and other classic horror favorites. During Halloween KDNL featured Shock Week. Where the Baron brought Horror Movies to the TV screens every night. Baron Von Crypt has made very few live appearance, but when did materialize it was at the legendary St. Louis Checkerdome where lines of fans waited to meet him. Baron Von Crypt had his share of catchphrases, "Blu", "Think About It" and "Trust me Punky" were some of his most known. Von Crypt made it into the pages of the now legendary TV Guide with full ads announcing his upcoming shows Shock Week Promotions. Mark Lashley as he is known in real life is also acknowledged as being the originator and designer of The McDonald's Happy Meal. Something he helped invent during his time in advertising. Out of nowhere in 2016 Baron Von Crypt reemerged. And with fan support he entered the modern era with interviews, Facebook pages, and chat groups. Soon classic episodes were revamped and showing worldwide on The Eerie Late Night Horror Channel and The Monster Channel on Roku. Again based on fan support and Peer group recognition, in 2017 Mark Lashley and Baron Von Crypt were inducted into the Horror Host Hall Of Fame at The Sharonville Center in Cincinnati Ohio. Where the legendary Baron Von Crypt made his first live appearance in 40 years.

=== 1971, WUTV-Channel 29 (Buffalo) ===
Creature Feature was the name of a show broadcast by WUTV Channel 29 in the Buffalo area. In 1971 WUTV aired the program on Saturday night. It later moved the program to Friday nights. It featured a collection of Japanese monster movies, American International Pictures movies and various titles from Warner Brothers, Columbia Pictures and other B movie companies. It eventually changed the name of the program to Sci-Fi Theater and moved it to Sunday Nights. It made a brief return in the late 70's on Saturday afternoons, but the contracts for the rights to most of the station movie packages began to run out and the station did not have the financial resources to renew or acquire new packages.

=== 1971, KMTV-Channel 3 (Omaha) ===
KMTV Channel 3 in Omaha, Nebraska, aired a long-running show called Creature Feature. It was broadcast from 1971 to 1983, and was hosted by Dr. San Guinary (John Jones). It was broadcast throughout the Omaha Area. Long after the show was cancelled, and after its host had died in 1988, the show was rebroadcast from 2001 until 2003, hosted by a new character known as "Son of San Guinary".

Creature Feature returned in 2011 as a live theater show within Omaha as Creature Feature Live, featuring a reboot of the Dr. San Guinary character. This was followed by the return of Creature Feature to Omaha area television in February 2013 on Fox Network's KPTM Fox 42 station, in a one-hour format featuring locally produced horror shorts and the new Doc (Christopher Palmer) continuing the previous Doc's comedy, as well as performing charity events with the character.

=== 1971, KTVU-Channel 2 (Oakland) ===
Creature Features ran on KTVU in the San Francisco Bay Area from 1971 to 1984, hosted by Bob Wilkins, and later by John Stanley, who took over in 1979. Wilkins had been hosting a similar program on KCRA in Sacramento from 1966, Seven Arts Theater. Wilkins showcased many classic horror and sci-fi movies; the classic low budget Plan 9 from Outer Space, produced and directed by Ed Wood and which features the last footage of Bela Lugosi, was first televised in the Bay Area on Creature Features. He also interviewed many sci-fi and horror movie personalities on the show, including Ray Harryhausen, Christopher Lee, William Shatner, Leonard Nimoy, John Landis, Douglas Adams, William Marshall, Forrest J Ackerman, Buster Crabbe, and several Star Wars performers, Mark Hamill, Harrison Ford, Carrie Fisher. During later years, the "Bootleg chorus" from the Mike Oldfield album Tubular Bells served as the show's theme song.

During much of this era, KTVU also ran classic horror films on Saturday late mornings under the Chiller Diller title, with no studio host; these were generally seen after the day's airing of Soul Train.

=== 1972, WKBG-Channel 56 (Boston) ===
Creature Double Features was the name of a show broadcast by WKBG Channel 56 in the Greater Boston area. In 1972 WKBG, a station in the Kaiser Broadcasting chain, aired its collection of Godzilla movies on Saturday under the title, The 4 O'Clock Movie.

Shortly thereafter, they started calling it Creature Feature and then Creature Double Feature. The show quickly became a staple of the station's Saturday programming schedule during the 1970s and early 1980s. The final show was sometime in 1983.

=== 1973, WDCA-Channel 20 (Washington, D.C.) ===
Creature Feature was also the name for a horror show in the Baltimore-Washington Metropolitan Area, broadcast on WDCA Channel 20, from 1973 to 1987. It was hosted by Dick Dyszel, known locally for his work as Bozo the Clown and Captain 20. On air he was known as Count Gore de Vol and to this day is considered to be the longest running horror host in history. Today Count Gore de Vol hosts a Creature Feature website horror show.

=== 1973, WTOG-Channel 44 (Tampa/St.Petersburg) ===
Creature Feature was shown from 1973 until 1995 on WTOG Channel 44 in the Tampa Bay Area. Its host was Dick Bennick Sr., performing under the name "Dr. Paul Bearer". The show created a large fan-following, and was recognized as the longest-running Creature Feature in America. The show was canceled after Bennick died following open heart surgery in 1995. In October 2004 Dr. Paul Bearer's long lost nephew; Professor Paul Bearer hosted Creature Feature but only for that month ending in a Halloween triple feature. There were talks to possibly bring the show back again in 2005 but nothing further developed.

=== mid-1970s, WCIX-Channel 6 (Miami/Ft. Lauderdale) ===
Creature Feature originally aired late 1972-early 1973 on Friday nights at 11:30pm out of WCIX-TV channel 6 an independent station broadcasting out of southern Miami-Dade County, Florida. The original host was the laid-back local radio personality Arnie Warren and his even more laid-back beagle Amos. The opening title as well as the segues into commercials was a still of Boris Karloff as the monster from the 1931 Universal film Frankenstein. The next incarnation (1974 or 1975) was with wacky local morning radio host Bwana Johnny this time formatted as a Saturday afternoon children's show with a live audience, new theme song, and opening sequence with the host wandering the streets of downtown Miami filmed in super fast motion. Unlike the previous host's easygoing relaxed style Bwana Johnny would be more active, interrupting and even inserting himself into the film with humorous dialogue to bizarre effect. An even later version of the show did not have a horror host per se, but relied on a voiceover actor to provide the bumpers and rejoins. This version began with a disturbing animated six fingered hand growing out of the ground, reaching toward the sky while "The Entrance into Sogo" from Barbarella played in the background. WCIX's Channel 6 Creature Feature played the classic Universal monster movies of the 1930s, 1940s, and early 1950s in addition to RKO and American international's post atomic bomb films. Later Japanese Toho, British Hammer, and Amicus films were added to the roster. The show went off the air due to WCIX-TV being acquired by the south Florida CBS affiliate WFOR-TV to the dismay of many local horror fanatics, who had grown up with these types of shows.

=== 1976, WKBS-Channel 48 (Philadelphia) ===
In the Philadelphia area, another Kaiser/Field station, WKBS Channel 48, aired this program between 1976 and 1979 after the success the show had in Boston. Two of the most popular films included Attack of the Mushroom People and Tourist Trap.

=== 1981, KSHB-Channel 41 (Kansas City) ===
The Creature Features was the name of a horror show which aired on Friday nights at 11:30 P.M. in the Kansas City Metropolitan Area on KSHB-TV Channel 41 beginning in 1981 through 1990. The hostess was Crematia Mortem (played by radio and TV personality Roberta Solomon). The title of the show was later changed to "Crematia's Friday Nightmare."

Assisting her were such characters as Rasputin and later Dweeb, her mostly unseen sidekicks voiced by KSHB's announcer, Paul Murphy. Other folks to visit Crematia's spooky castle home included her mother Desiree, her sister Cremora, and their strange old cousin, Henry. Channel 41's Creature Feature could be seen via cable in Missouri, Kansas, Iowa, Nebraska, Arkansas, Oklahoma and parts of Texas.

The theme music for the Creature Feature was written (and played on a Casio keyboard) by KSHB-TV's Creative Services Director, Rob Forsythe.

=== 1983, KBSI-Channel 23 (Cape Girardeau) ===
Misty Brew's Creature Feature aired every Friday Night at 11 pm CST, on KBSI TV 23 The Fox Affiliated Station for The Paducah, Ky/Harrisburg, IL/Cape Girardeau, Mo Television Market. Making her television debut in 1983, Misty Brew continued to host a variety of Creature Feature movie until late 1989. Her signature greeting was "Good Evening Human Creatures." And she continued to surprise, invigorate and entice her audience over the years. Generating much fan mail from across the heartland. Misty was often accompanied by various campy co/host such as Drac, Freddie, Wolifie, DT, Mother Zombie, and her old dear friend "Frankie". Her on-air personality progressed from Dark and Mystical to Wacky off the wall shtick with a Midwest flare. Her sassy jabs and pop culture heckles were a favorite of her viewers. Misty Brew often made personal appearances and Fan Meetings. She was a regular in local newspaper and TV Guides from the late 80s. Misty Brew's Creature Feature aired classic films such as Psycho, Swamp Thing, Phantom of the Opera, The Haunting, Theater of Blood, and the yearly Halloween Marathon. "In Missouri GREGORY GRAVE hosted Shock! (in the late 1960s and early 1970s.) However, it was the unforgettable MISTY BREW (1983–1990) that most people still remember!" In 2014 Misty Brew returned with brand new episodes of her show, seen on YouTube, Kreepy Kastle, The Monster Channel and on Roku. In 2015 the first issue of Misty Brew's comic book, and Action Figure was released to stores. Misty Brew was inducted into the Horror Host Hall of Fame in 2015.

=== 1980s, KPLR-TV-Channel 11 (Saint Louis) ===
Saturday Night Shocker aired on KPLR-TV TV Channel 11 in St. Louis Missouri in the 1980s

=== 2009, KOFY TV 20 (San Francisco) ===
Creepy KOFY Movie Time aired on KOFY TV 20 on Saturday nights from 2009 to 2019. The program was hosted by local radio personality No Name, and Balrok, a demon, who claimed to broadcast from caves under the KOFY studios. The hosts had a snarky frat-boy style and had many off-color guests, including local comedians, burlesque performers, and adult film actresses. The broadcast featured an in-house band, the surf/punk band The Deadlies, and the hosts were often flanked during the broadcast by a variety of comely bikini clad models/actresses/fans.

Creature Features airs on KOFY TV 20 on Saturday nights, featuring as its host a retired rock star character named Vincent Van Dahl, along with his housemate Tangella and astute butler Mr. Livingston. Guests have included Erin Brockovich, Steve "Zetro" Souza, Veronica Carlson, Candace Hilligoss, Jon Provost, and Kathy Garver, among others.

KOFY became a Grit affiliate in 2022, and Creature Features was dropped. However, new episodes of the series continue to be produced; the show can be viewed on YouTube as well as on a streaming service known as Creature Features TV.

== Broadcast cities (international) ==
=== 1972, Sydney, New South Wales ===
Originally produced as Awful Movies, from 1966–1968, on the 0–10 Network, it was picked up by the Seven Network, ATN-7 and aired as Creature Features in New South Wales in 1972.

The 0–10 Network had four different actors host Awful Movies, as Deadly Ernest. Ian Bannerman in New South Wales, Shane Porteus in Queensland, Hedley Cullen in South Australia, and Ralph Baker in Victoria. Deadly Ernest would appear in short comedy skits during the commercials, with other characters. One of the Deadly Ernest would start with himself and another ghoul, dressed in undertaker's attire, running outside and inside the Studios to a fast-paced instrumental tune.

Creature Features which aired on ATN-7 Channel 7 was hosted by "Vampira" – played by Jill Forster.

=== 2001, Cinemax ===
During Halloween 2001, Cinemax broadcast a series of five television movies they called Creature Features:

- She Creature – Directed by Sebastian Gutierrez and starring Rufus Sewell and Carla Gugino
- Earth vs. the Spider – Directed by Scott Ziehl and starring Dan Aykroyd, Theresa Russell, and Devon Gummersall
- How to Make a Monster – Directed by George Huang and starring Clea Duvall and Steven Culp
- The Day the World Ended – Directed by Terence Gross and starring Nastassja Kinski and Randy Quaid
- Teenage Caveman – Directed by Larry Clark and starring Andrew Keegan and Tara Subkoff

Each reused the title of a low-budget movie produced by American International Pictures during the 1950s. Some of the new movies were remakes of the earlier films, and some only had the title in common. all of these were produced by Stan Winston, Colleen Camp and Samuel Z. Arkoff's son, Lou Arkoff. in addition to remake the films, another reason Stan Winston made all of these films was he'd had worked with AIP in their last years providing special effects for The Bat People (1974) and to start a toy line, which included action figures from the films.

Early on during the development process Robert Rodriguez was scheduled to direct a remake of The Brain Eaters as part of the series. A remake of War of the Colossal Beast was also planned as a film for the series.

== Board game ==
In 1975, Research Games Inc. released a board game based on Creature Features. The gameplay greatly resembled Monopoly, however, instead of buying properties, houses and hotels, players would purchase Universal films such as Frankenstein or Dracula, then purchase the stars involved, such as Boris Karloff or Bela Lugosi.

== SCTV parody ==
Second City Television's "Monster Chiller Horror Theatre" was a recurring sketch that parodied both horror TV shows and the films featured on them. The fictional show was hosted by Count Floyd, played by the station's newscaster, Floyd Robertson (both played by Joe Flaherty), and recurring characters included fictional film villains Dr. Tongue (John Candy) and his servant, Bruno (Eugene Levy).

== See also ==
- Chiller Theatre (Green Bay), 1984–2009
- Chiller Theatre (New York), 1961–1982 and later
- Chiller Theatre (Pittsburgh), 1963–1983
- Chiller Thriller
- Creature Double Feature
- Fright Night
- Holiday Film Festival
- Horror host
- The Vampira Show
