= Chill =

Chill or Chills may refer to:

== Arts, entertainment, and media ==
=== Games ===
- Chill (role-playing game)
- Chill (video game), a 1998 snowboarding game for PlayStation One

=== Music ===
- "Chill" (Anthony Amorim song), 2017
- "Chill" (The Rasmus song), 2001
- "Chill", a song by Lisa from the 2025 album Alter Ego
- "Chill", a song by Moka Only from the 2006 album Desired Effect
- "Chill", a song by Stray Kids from the 2022 extended play Maxident
- "Chill", a song from the soundtrack of the 2015 video game Undertale by Toby Fox
- Chills (EP), 2008 EP by Clint Lowery
- "Chills" (Down with Webster song), 2013
- "Chills" (James Barker Band song), 2017
- "Chills", 2019 single by Why Don't We
- Chill & Groove, an electronic music duo
- The Chills, a band from New Zealand
- The Chills, an early 1980s San Francisco area rock band, precursor to The Sorentinos
- Chill-out music, also known as "chill"

=== Radio stations ===
- Smooth Chill, a British digital radio station
- RTÉ Chill, an Irish digital radio station
- SiriusXM Chill, an electronica radio station

=== Other uses in arts, entertainment, and media ===
- Chill (film), a 2007 low-budget, independent horror film written and directed by Serge Rudnunsky
- Joe Chill, a character in the Batman series attributed with the murder of Bruce Wayne's parents
- The Chill (Macdonald novel), a crime novel by Ross Macdonald
- The Chill, a horror novel by Michael Koryta under the pen name Scott Carson

== People ==
- Abraham Chill (1912–2004), first Jewish chaplain of the United States Military Academy
- Kurt Chill (1895–1976), German World War II Generalleutnant
- Ollie Chill (1878–1958), American Major League Baseball umpire
- Chill Wills (1902–1978), American actor and singer
- "Chill", a nickname of Daryl Mitchell (born 1965), American actor
- Tha Chill (born 1970), rapper and producer from the hip hop group Compton's Most Wanted
- Akhenaton (rapper) (born 1968), French hip hop artist who uses "Chill" as one of his aliases

== Sports teams ==
- Colorado Chill, a National Women's Basketball League team from 2004 to 2006
- Columbus Chill, an East Coast Hockey League team from 1991 to 1999
- Coulee Region Chill (NA3HL), a junior ice hockey team of the North American 3 Hockey League based out of Wisconsin
- Edmonton Chill, original name (2007–2008) of the Edmonton Energy, an International Basketball League team in Edmonton, Alberta, Canada
- Green Bay Chill, in the Legends Football League (formerly the Lingerie Football League)
- Palm Springs Chill, an independent baseball team
- St. Charles Chill, a minor league ice hockey team of the Central Hockey League based in St. Charles, Missouri
- Thunder Bay Chill, a Canadian soccer team based in Thunder Bay, Ontario, Canada, in the USL Premier Development League

== Other uses ==
- Chill (casting), an object placed in a mold to (locally) increase the solidification rate of a casting
- CHILL, a consortium of health libraries in London
- CHILL, a programming language
- Chilling (combinatorial game theory), a technique making hot games amenable to the methods of the theory
- Chills, a feeling of coldness during high fevers
- Postpartum chills, or "chills and shivering", which can affect a person after childbirth
- Slang for to relax or hang out

== See also ==
- Chiller (disambiguation)
- Chillin' (disambiguation)
- Chilling effect (law), a situation where speech or conduct is suppressed or limited by fear of penalization, also known as "Libel chill"
