= Pharaoh's Curse (film) =

1957 film by Lee Sholem

- Theatrical release poster
- Directed by: Lee Sholem
- Screenplay by: Richard Landau (original story and screenplay)
- Produced by: Howard W. Koch
- Starring: Mark Dana; Ziva Rodann; Diane Brewster; George Neise; Alvara Guillot; Ben Wright
- Cinematography: William Margulies
- Edited by: George A. Gittens, A.C.E.
- Music by: Les Baxter
- Production companies: A Bel-Air Production; Sunrise Pictures, Inc.
- Distributed by: United Artists
- Release date: February 1957
- Running time: 66 minutes
- Country: United States
- Language: English

Pharaoh's Curse is a 1957 American horror film directed by Lee Sholem and written by Richard H. Landau. The film stars Mark Dana, Ziva Rodann, Diane Brewster, George Neise, Alvaro Guillot, and Ben Wright. The film was released in February 1957 by United Artists, as a double feature with Voodoo Island.

== Plot ==
In 1902 Cairo Egypt, as a riot breaks out in the street, Captain Storm is assigned with a small contingent consisting of himself, Gromley, and Smolet to retrieve the members of an unsanctioned archeological expedition in the Valley of the Kings who are seeking the lost tomb of Rahateb. Storm's mission is compounded to escort the expedition leader's wife Sylvia Quentin as they take a planned route, the group encountering a strange woman named Simira whose brother Numar is helping the Rahateb expedition. Though Storm turns down Simira's offer to lead them on a more direct route, he relents after Sylvia is stung by a scorpion. By the time the group arrive to the site, Simira announces they are too late as Robert Quentin and his group have opened a sarcophagus with Numar suddenly collapsing to the floor.

Quentin is upset about learning he is return to Cairo and that Sylvia only came to end their relationship in person. Returning to the tomb with Storm following after him, they find the mummy is missing with cat footprints leading from the sarcophagus to a solid wall. Quentin storms off to confront Numar upon realizing something was off about the guide's joining the expedition, only to learn that Numar is rapidly aging with no pulse. Later that night, Numar enters the tomb complex as Gromley found one of the animals drained of its blood. Storm confines an unhelpful Simira to her tent as the group chase after Numar, the group splitting up and later finding Gromley after Numar drained him of his blood. During Gromley's autopsy, Andrews and Brecht had translated a stone tablet which details the sarcophagus belonging to Rahateb's high priest who executed ritualistic suicide to be bound by a three-thousand year curse to kill all intruders in the tomb after possessing another body.

Storm leads another venture into the tomb before finding a dying Brecht emerging from the Chamber of Bastet where he was attacked by Numar. Storm attempts to grab Numar when he falls back into Rahateb's chamber and unintentionally rips his arm off. As Farraday deduces that Numar's body had decomposed to the point of gradual disintegration, Simara warns Storm that the survivors must leave or also be killed by Numar. Later, a fearful Sylvia runs into the tomb complex after seeing a cat-like shadow prior to Simira's entering her tent. Sylvia is found by Smolet and is brought to Storm, convincing him and the others to find Simira. But Quentin forces Andrews at gunpoint to find a way to open the pathway to Rahateb's resting place, only to be let in by the decaying Numar and fall victim to a rigged cave-in. After Storm and Beauchamp confirm Quentin's death, Beauchamp finds Simira's amulet as the group proceed to leave the tomb complex. But they find the lid of the high priest's sarcophagus back in place, finding the mummy inside to be Numar. The group then realize Numar was the reincarnation of the high priest while deducing that Simira is the goddess Bastet in human form. Everyone agrees to cover up what had occurred and never divulge the tomb's existence.

== Cast ==
- Mark Dana as Capt. Storm
- Ziva Rodann as Simira (credited as Ziva Shapir)
- Diane Brewster as Sylvia Quentin
- George Neise as Robert Quentin
- Alvaro Guillot as Numar
- Ben Wright as Walter Andrews
- Guy Prescott as Dr. Michael Faraday
- Terence deMarney as Sgt. Smollett
- Richard Peel as Sgt. Gromley
- Kurt Katch as Hans Brecht
- Robert Fortin as Claude Beauchamp
- Ralph Clanton as Col. Cross
