= Chiller Theatre =

Chiller Theatre may refer to:

- Chiller Theatre (1961 TV series), an American horror television series airing 1961–1982 and later
- Chiller Theatre (1963 TV series), an American horror television series airing 1963–1983
- Chiller Theatre (1974 TV series), an American horror television series airing 1974–1978
- Chiller Theatre (1984 TV series), an American horror television series airing 1984–2009

== See also ==
- Chiller Thriller, an American horror television series airing 1974–1977
