= Chiller (disambiguation) =

A chiller is a machine to remove heat from liquid.

Chiller may also refer to:

== Entertainment ==
- Chiller (video game), a video game
- Chiller (TV network), a defunct NBCUniversal-owned cable channel specializing in horror
- Chiller (TV series), British television series
- Chiller Theatre (disambiguation), the name of multiple science fiction and horror movie programs
- Chiller Cabinet, radio show created by Ben Eshmade
- Wes Craven's Chiller, a made for TV horror/thriller released in 1985
- Batman & Robin: The Chiller, a roller-coaster at Six Flags Great Adventure
- "Chiller", an episode of Annoying Orange that spoofs Michael Jackson's "Thriller"
- Chiller, a webtoon popularized by the story "Bongcheon-Dong Ghost"

== Other ==
- Water chiller, in relation to hydroponics
- An Indian slang for change (small denominations of money given in return for a larger denominations)

== See also ==
- Cooler (disambiguation)
- Chill (disambiguation)
