= Jean Engstrom =

American actress (1920-1997)

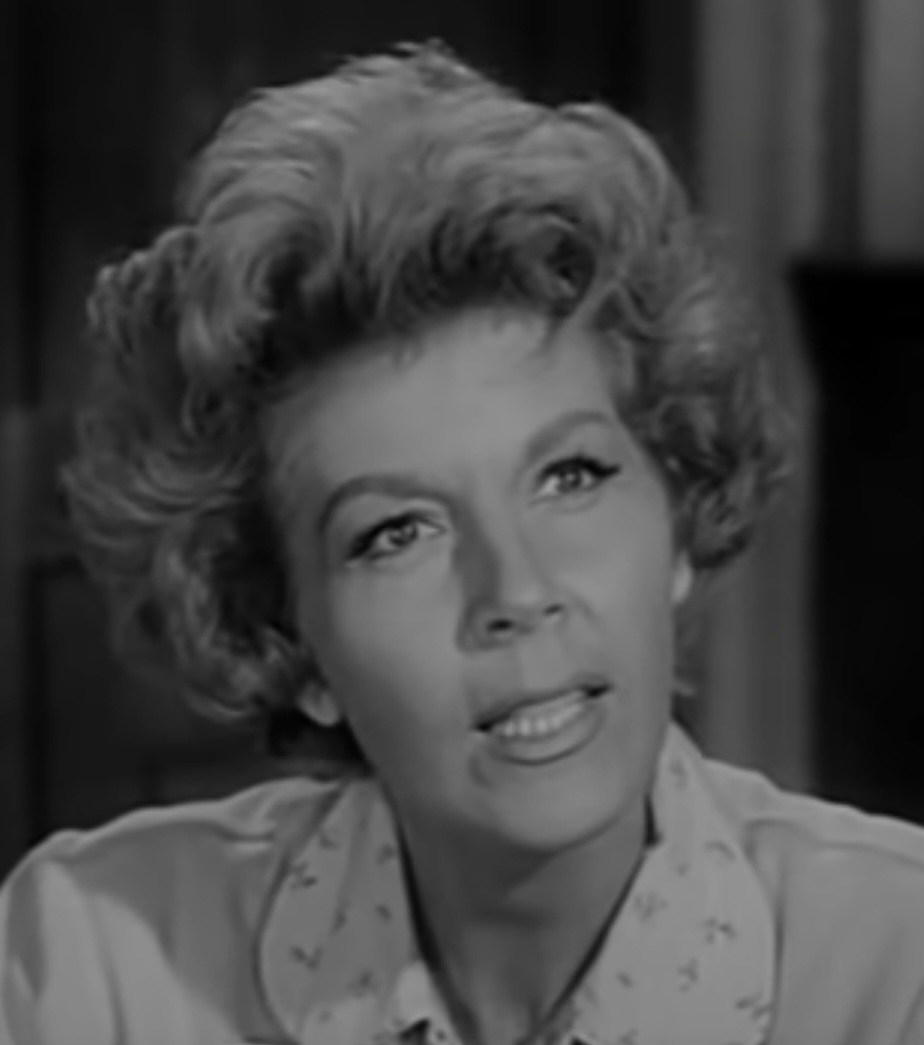
- Jean Engstorm in One Step Beyond 1961
- Born: Flora Jean Bovie; July 25, 1920; Detroit, Michigan, U.S.
- Died: March 20, 1997 (aged 76); Hemet, California, U.S.
- Resting place: Fort Rosecrans National Cemetery
- Years active: 1954–1966
- Spouse(s): Richard H. Moon (1940 - ?) (divorced) (1 child); Elliott Engstrom (1947-1997) (her death)
- Children: Jena Engstrom

Jean Engstrom (born Flora Jean Bovie; July 25, 1920 – March 20, 1997) was an American actress active in regional theater, movies, and television in the 1950s and 1960s.

== Background ==
Engstrom was born in Detroit, Michigan, on July 25, 1920, the elder of two children born to Clarence Augustus Bovie, an artist and commercial illustrator, and Nona Iola Cochrun. After her father's death, 1930 census records show that she and her mother and younger brother were living with her father's mother (paternal grandmother) in Augusta, Michigan. In 1935, they were living in Battle Creek, Michigan. When Engstrom was 16, the family moved to Southern California and lived for a while with her maternal grandmother, and there she completed high school. On February 14, 1940, Flora Jean Bovie married Richard Harold Moon in Baldwin Park, California. On June 30, 1942, their only child, daughter Liana Jeanne Moon (later to be actress Jena Engstrom) was born. Flora Jean and Richard Moon divorced, and in about 1947 she married her second husband, Elliott E. Engstrom, who later adopted her daughter. They remained married until her death. In the mid-1980s she developed breast cancer, had a mastectomy in July 1985, and died of breast cancer on March 20, 1997, in a convalescent hospital in Hemet, California. Her body is buried at Fort Rosecrans National Cemetery in San Diego, California.

== Career ==
Engstrom originally wanted to become a singer, but a crushed breast plate suffered in an automobile accident affected her vocal cords and she turned to modeling. A 1958 TV Guide article states that she began acting in 1940, while a 1962 syndicated news articles states that she began acting in 1951. Whenever her acting career started, she began acting with little theater groups in and around the Hollywood area. She later moved to work in movies and in television and during this time studied with Francis Lederer's improvisation group. She used the name Jean Engstrom professionally and during her career she appeared in over 50 plays, in at least eight movies, and in about 40 television programs before leaving acting.

=== Theatrical career (regional theater) ===
It is not clear when Engstrom began acting in regional theater, but she spent a lot of time working in theater. By the time of the 1962 syndicated news article she told the interviewer that she had appeared in 52 plays. Her most notable stage appearance may have come in January 1961 when she appeared in the title role of George Bernard Shaw's Candida, co-starring Jeff Morrow and directed by John Newland. The play was produced by the Los Angeles-based acting, writing and directing group Projects '58 and televised by KNXT television in Los Angeles and shown by television stations across the country.

=== Movie career ===
A theatrical appearance with a stock company in Tucson, Arizona, led to a short-lived contract with Paramount Pictures.

Most of Engstrom's movie appearances were in bit parts, and her first recorded appearances began in 1954 with roles as party guests in Drive a Crooked Road starring Mickey Rooney and in A Star Is Born (1954) starring Judy Garland and James Mason. In 1956, she used the name Flora Jean Engstrom for the only time when she appeared in a small role in The Search for Bridey Murphy, starring Teresa Wright. Her larger roles came in more modest productions, receiving featured billing in the 1957 production Voodoo Island and the 1958 production The Space Children, which are now cult classics. Her character Claire Winter in Voodoo Island is presented as a lesbian. She also appeared as a party guest in the 1958 film The Party Crashers.

Her final movie appearance was a starring role in the 1965 Billy Graham-produced The Restless Ones in which she played Mrs. Harris, the alcoholic mother of April, played by Kim Darby.

=== Television career ===
Engstrom began appearing in television in 1953 although her earliest TV appearances have not been confirmed. Her first TV appearances recorded in current databases are in three 1955 episodes of Medic starring Richard Boone. Between 1953 and 1965 she appeared in about 40 TV programs, mostly in supporting roles. She appeared in westerns, crime dramas, comedies, and contemporary dramas in which she often played mothers (including an unwed mother who gives birth during an episode of Have Gun, Will Travel), but she also played wives and widows, a school psychologist, a social secretary, and even a deputy sheriff and a psychotic killer. In addition to her three appearances on Medic she appeared twice more with Richard Boone in episodes of Have Gun, Will Travel. She also made multiple appearances on other shows, including three appearances on Perry Mason starring Raymond Burr and two appearances each on Peter Gunn starring Craig Stevens, an electrifying turn as a diner keeper turned cold blooded killer on Highway Patrol (1957 U.S. TV series), two on Thriller starring Boris Karloff, and two on Hazel starring Shirley Booth. She appeared as Lonny Chapman's wife in "Dead Man's Tale", series 3 episode 17 of One Step Beyond in 1961.

=== Mother and daughter ===
Engstrom's daughter Liana was also an actress and appeared as Jena Engstrom in at least 37 television episodes between 1960 and 1964 (when it appears that she left acting for health reasons). Most on-line databases and this article have listed only two of the three TV shows in which they appeared together.

The first of the two shows listed is the April 1961 episode of the CBS program Rawhide titled "Incident of the Lost Idol" in which they appeared as mother and daughter. They had only one brief scene together as the story was not about their relationship. The second show listed is the January 1962 episode "To Sell Another Human Being" of ABC's The New Breed, starring Leslie Nielsen, in which mother Jean played a wealthy woman who with her husband (played by Richard Arlen) adopt a baby through an adoption mill. The police get involved when the baby's natural mother, played by daughter Jena, tries to get her baby back. The third television show in with they appeared together is an unidentified 30-minute religious program presented in 1961 in which they played mother and daughter. In this story a girl (Jena) has trouble relating to her parents until a session with teenagers at a church is recorded and the recording made available to the parents to listen to. Appearing in this show with Jean and Jena Engstrom are Robert Stevenson as Jena’s father and Richard Evans as her boyfriend. This film, minus the opening and closing credits, has been posted on-line.

=== Confused credits ===
The acting credits of mother Jean and daughter Jena were confused at the time they were active together in the business resulting in mixed credits in newspapers and problems with pay checks. The mixed credits appear in some Internet databases, but the situation is improving as site managers are posting corrections as the errors are discovered.

=== DVDs ===
Several of the television series listed below have been released by their studios on DVD that are available for sale or for rent. Those marked "Yes" include sets with the episodes featuring Jean Engstrom.

=== Television roles ===
Note: "Episode" column: 2.9 indicates Season 2, Episode 9, etc.

AIR DATE	SHOW	EPISODE	EPISODE TITLE	CHARACTER	NOTES	DVD
1953-1955	My Favorite Husband				No other information available about this appearance.	
Jan. 24, 1955	Medic	1.15	"Breath of Life"	Nurse Blakeny	1st of 3 appearances on this show.	Yes
Sep. 15, 1955	Medic	2.1	"All the Lonely Nights"	Marian Castle	2nd of 3 appearances on this show.	Yes
Oct. 31, 1955	Medic	2.7	"When Mama Says Jump"	Mrs. Dixon	3rd of 3 appearances on this show.	Yes
Nov. 15, 1955	Big Town	6.6	"Prison Riot"			
May 1, 1957	State Trooper	1.32	"Diamonds Come High"	Deputy Sheriff Lili Haskell		Yes
May 3, 1957	The West Point Story	1.32	"Flareup"	Colonel’s Wife		Yes
Dec. 24, 1957	Telephone Time	3.16	"A Picture of the Magi"	Elga		Yes
Jan. 6, 1958	Highway Patrol	3.14	"Hideout""	Flo Durfee		Yes
Apr. 6, 1958	General Electric Theater	6.26	"No Hiding Place"	Mrs. Lindsay		
Jul. 15, 1958	Shirley Temple Theatre	1.9	"The Little Lame Prince"	Snow Maiden		
Apr. 6, 1959	Peter Gunn	1.28	"Pay Now, Kill Later"	Lady Customer	1st of 2 appearances on this show.	Yes
Dec. 6, 1960	Thriller	1.12	"The Big Blackout"	Nurse Sue	1st of 2 appearances on this show.	Yes
Jan. 17, 1961	Alcoa Presents: One Step Beyond	3.17	"Dead Man's Tale"	Jan Werris		
Feb. 13, 1961	Peter Gunn	3.19	"I Know It's Murder"	Helene Eustis	2nd of 2 appearances on this show.	Yes
Feb. 16, 1961	Gunslinger	1.2	"The Hostage Fort"	Mrs. Barnes		
Mar. 18, 1961	Have Gun, Will Travel	4.26	"The Gold Bar"	Leah	1st of 2 appearances on this show.	Yes
Apr. 16, 1961	Rawhide	3.24	"Incident of the Lost Idol"	Mrs. Manson	Daughter Jean Engstrom also appears in this episode.	Yes
Oct. 16, 1961	87th Precinct	1.4	"The Modus Man"	Mrs. Renfew		Yes
Dec. 7, 1961	The Investigators	1.10	"Panic Wagon"	Frieda Gregory		
Jan 16,1962	The New Breed	1.16	"To Sell Another Human Being"	Carol Willets	Daughter Jena Engstrom also appears in this episode.	
Feb. 1, 1962	Hazel	1.18	"Hazel's Secret Wish"	Mrs. Camden	1st of 2 appearances on this show.	Yes
Feb 9, 1962	Route 66	2.18	"How Much a Pound Is Albatross?"	Dr. Bell		Yes
Apr. 9, 1962	Thriller	2.28	"The Innocent Bystanders"	Anne Grant	2nd of 2 appearances on this show.	Yes
Sep. 20, 1962	Hazel	2.1	"Hazel's Cousin"	June Lowell	2nd of 2 appearances on this show.	Yes
Oct. 4, 1962	Perry Mason	6.2	"The Case of the Capricious Corpse"	Claudia Demming	1st of 3 appearances on this show.	Yes
Oct. 6, 1962	Have Gun, Will Travel	6.4	"A Place for Abel Hix"	Mrs. Hix	2nd of 2 appearances on this show.	Yes
Mar. 24, 1963	This Is the Life		"Side By Side"	Laura Blair		
Apr. 23, 1963	Empire	1.29	"65 Miles Is a Long, Long Way"	Mrs. Sangster		
Oct. 3, 1963	The Donna Reed Show	6.3	"Whatever You Wish"	Ellen Farrell		
Nov. 15, 1963	The Farmer's Daughter	1.9	"Miss Cheese"	Saleslady		
Dec. 20, 1963	The Great Adventure	1.11	"A Boy at War"	Elizabeth		
Jan 9, 1964	Perry Mason	7.14	"The Case of the Accosted Accountant"	Vera Hillman	2nd of 3 appearances on this show.	Yes
Oct. 20, 1964	Mr. Novak	2.4	"Little Girl Lost"	Mrs. Currie		
Apr. 22, 1965	Dr. Kildare	4.30	"Believe and Live"	Dr. Larson's Nurse		
Nov. 14, 1965	Bonanza	7.10	"The Strange One"	Francine		
Dec. 19, 1965	Perry Mason	9.14	"The Case of the Golden Girls"	Corinne Richland	3rd of 3 appearances on this show.	Yes
Dec. 23, 1965	My Three Sons	6.14	"Douglas a Go-Go"	Mrs. Hargrove		
Feb. 2, 1966	Bob Hope Presents the Chrysler Theatre	3.12	"When Hell Froze"	Hattie House		
Oct. 5, 1966	Death Valley Days	15.4	"Brute Angel"	Esther McBain		
Nov 14, 1966	Family Affair	1.9	"A Matter for Experts"	Edith Morse, Phd.	(final television appearance)	Yes

=== Movie roles ===
RELEASE	TITLE	CHARACTER	COMMENTS	DVD
Mar. 10, 1954	Drive a Crooked Road	party guest	Uncredited	
Oct. 16, 1954	A Star Is Born	Malibu party guest	Uncredited	Yes
Oct. 1, 1956	The Search for Bridey Murphy	hysterical woman	As Flora Jean Engstrom, Uncredited	
Feb. 1957	Voodoo Island	Claire Winter		Yes
Jun. 1958	The Space Children	Peg Gamble		Yes
Sep. 1958	The Party Crashers	May	Uncredited	
Nov. 28, 1961	The Errand Boy	bit role	Uncredited	Yes
Dec. 2, 1965	The Restless Ones	Mrs. Harris (April's Mother)		Yes
