= The Green Years (film) =

1946 film by Victor Saville

- Theatrical release poster
- Directed by: Victor Saville
- Screenplay by: Robert Ardrey; Sonya Levien
- Based on: The Green Years; 1944 novel by A. J. Cronin
- Produced by: Leon Gordon
- Starring: Charles Coburn; Tom Drake; Beverly Tyler; Hume Cronyn; Gladys Cooper; Dean Stockwell; Selena Royle; Jessica Tandy; Richard Haydn; Andy Clyde
- Cinematography: George Folsey
- Edited by: Robert J. Kern
- Music by: Herbert Stothart
- Production company: Metro-Goldwyn-Mayer
- Distributed by: Loew's Inc.
- Release date: July 4, 1946
- Running time: 127 minutes
- Country: United States
- Language: English
- Budget: $2,280,000
- Box office: $6,654,000

The Green Years is a 1946 American comedy-drama film directed by Victor Saville and featuring Charles Coburn, Tom Drake, Beverly Tyler and Hume Cronyn. It was adapted by Robert Ardrey and Sonya Levien from A. J. Cronin's 1944 novel of the same name. It tells the story of the coming-of-age of an Irish orphan in Scotland.

== Plot ==
In 1900, Robert Shannon, a young orphan, is sent from Ireland to live with his grandparents in Scotland. His great-grandfather becomes the lad's mentor/father figure, helping him overcome the challenges of youth, and mollifying the cold stinginess of Robert's grandfather. The young Robert suffers life's trials, and the kind, old great-grandfather, despite being given to drink and telling tall tales, is always there to help him rebound. In time, the intelligent Robert grows into a teenager and comes to love his childhood friend Alison. After many twists and turns, setbacks and near misses, fate inevitably and irrevocably intervenes. He proceeds to attend medical college, attains a career, then marries his sweetheart.

== Cast ==
- Charles Coburn as Alexander Gow
- Tom Drake as Robert Shannon (as a young man)
- Beverly Tyler as Alison Keith (as a young woman)
- Hume Cronyn as Papa Leckie
- Gladys Cooper as Grandma Leckie
- Dean Stockwell as Robert Shannon (as a child)
- Selena Royle as Mama Leckie
- Jessica Tandy as Kate Leckie
- Richard Haydn as Jason Reid
- Andy Clyde as Saddler Boag
- Norman Lloyd as Adam Leckie
- Robert North as Murdoch Leckie
- Wallace Ford as Jamie Nigg
- Eilene Janssen as Alison Keith (as a child)
- Hank Daniels as Gavin Blair (as a young man)
- Richard Lyon as Gavin Blair (as a child)
- Henry O'Neill as Canon Roche
- Henry Stephenson as Blakely
- Norma Varden as Mrs. Bosomley

=== Uncredited ===
- Morris Ankrum as Dr. Galbraith
- Jimmy Aubrey as Speller
- Gary Gray as Boy Making First Communion
- Brandon Hurst as Bookseller
- Mitchell Lewis as Smithy
- Guy Stockwell as Young Boy

== Reception ==
The film was very popular at the box office. According to MGM records it made a then-massive $4,222,000 in the U.S. and Canada and $2,432,000 elsewhere, leading to a profit of $1,941,000. It was one of the more popular films of the year.

== Awards and nominations ==
- Academy Award for Best Supporting Actor (nomination) – Charles Coburn
- Academy Award for Best Cinematography (nomination) – George Folsey
- Golden Berlin Bear for Best Picture at the Berlin International Film Festival (nomination) – Philip Leacock

== The Green Years on Turner Classic Movies ==
The Green Years was shown on Turner Classic Movies on July 13, 2008 as part of a salute to Hume Cronyn. It was also shown on the network April 8, 2021 as part of their annual "31 Days of Oscar" showcase.

=== Introductory comments ===
"Hi, I'm Robert Osborne. One of Broadway's and Hollywood's finest, Hume Cronyn, is our man of the night. Next, we have Hume Cronyn in a movie called The Green Years from MGM in 1946. It's one of those movies that you probably never heard of and maybe don't recognize the names from the cast, but the movie itself is really good and certainly worth watching. It's a story about an orphan Irish lad taken in by Scottish relatives where the boy begins a long and loving relationship with his rather crusty but fascinating great-grandfather. The film was based on a novel by the famed writer A. J. Cronin and it's one of the few films made by MGM in the forties which didn't have a Gable or a Tracy, a Rooney, Garson or Hedy Lamarr or some other big star among the players, but the cast we do get really couldn't be better. The leading role is split between two actors — Dean Stockwell, at the age of ten, playing the young lad, Robert, and Tom Drake plays the grown-up Robert — and both are wonderful. Tom Drake you'll recognize from the movie Meet Me in St. Louis. He was the boy next door that Judy Garland falls in love with and sings about.

In our movie there's also Charles Coburn giving a rip-roaring performance which earned him a Supporting Actor Academy Award nomination as Robert's gruff but very loving great-grandad. And you'll see Hume Cronyn, this time appearing with his real-life wife, Jessica Tandy. This was actually the third movie in which the couple had appeared [note: after 1944's The Seventh Cross and Blonde Fever], but they don't play husband and wife in this movie — Cronyn actually plays Jessica's father — and that casting is even more curious when you consider that Jessica Tandy was actually older than Hume Cronyn. She was also very pregnant at the time this movie was made. Well, when the director, Victor Saville, actually found out she was pregnant, he was gonna replace Jessica, but then he couldn't find anybody he thought could do the part as well as she. So she stayed. But do notice that she's often bundled up in very bulky clothes or strategically placed behind furniture to cover her expanding torso. Here, from nineteen forty six, a really wonderful movie, The Green Years."

=== Robert Osborne's closing comments ===
"You know, it's kind of hard to grasp the fact that sweet-faced little Dean Stockwell who we just saw as the young Robert, is the same fellow who, years later, played the lip-synching psychopath in David Lynch's Blue Velvet. Dean Stockwell's had a very interesting career — three or four careers, really. There's Dean Stockwell, child star, in films like the one we just showed… and also Anchors Aweigh and The Boy with Green Hair and other movies. Then there's Dean Stockwell that played the thrill killer in Compulsion, as well as the stoned-out hippie in Psych-Out. Then there's a grown-up Dean Stockwell in Blue Velvet and Paris, Texas, Oscar-nominated for Married to the Mob, and a big part of the hit cable series, Battlestar Galactica. Quite a career… and quite an actor. Up next, more with the great Hume Cronyn, as he becomes the object of a young woman's affection, in one of his few starring roles in a movie."
