= Dr. Shock =

TV personality

Joseph Zawislak (a.k.a. "Dr. Shock")
- 1970 promo picture
- Born: Joseph Zawislak; Philadelphia, Pennsylvania
- Occupation: Television horror movie presenter host
- Years active: 1969–1979
- Known for: Scream-In, Mad Theater and Horror Theater (host)

Dr. Shock was a prominent 1970s fictional character, appearing on television as a horror host presenter, that was created and portrayed by magician Joseph Zawislak, commonly known as Joe Zawislak. The character was created as an on-air host for the broadcast of B-rated horror movies for Philadelphia's WPHL-TV (channel 17) that included three different show titles during his career: Scream-In, Mad Theater and Horror Theater. Dr. Shock, whose sign-off, "Let there be fright!", became a mantra for legions of school-age fans in Philadelphia for this local beloved celebrity. Fredy Benton, a young comedy writer and impressionist who worked with Dr. Shock in the early days, said that the horror host performed a version of the rubber chicken gag later made popular by Svengoolie.

== History ==
Joseph Zawislak was a fan of John Zacherle, who had previously been a "horror host" on local Philadelphia television and created his Dr. Shock persona based on the character "Roland" created by Zacherle and with his permission. The character Dr. Shock first aired on WPHL-TV on March 7, 1970, with the broadcast of 1963's Diary of a Madman. His first show lasted 13 weeks, but a protest march and 10,000 letters from angry fans put him back on the air, but required major show format changes. Three different shows were hosted during his career span, titled Scream-In, Mad Theater and Horror Theater.

The character he played was costumed as a lively zombie with slicked-down hair, a black frock coat and white spats, assisted in his laboratory by a one-eyed hunchback named Boris. His usual entrance was from inside a coffin. In the revised format, he brought on his nine-month old daughter Doreen in 1969 and named her "Bubbles" for the show's sponsor, Bubbles-Booth soda. This softened Dr. Shock's Count Dracula image and the toddler grew up on the air, along with his fans.

The Chattanooga "Dr. Shock" (Tommy Reynolds) first aired on June 3, 1972 on WTVC Channel 9, over two years after the well-established original Philadelphia Dr. Shock (Zawislak).

== Biography ==
Zawislak was a resident of Roxborough, a neighborhood in Philadelphia, a devoted amateur magician, a deli worker, an insurance salesman, a pinball arcade manager, a gas cylinder truck driver, then a horror host. Suddenly, after 10 years of performing, he died of a heart attack in 1979 at the young age of 42.
