= Frontier Circus =

American Western TV series (1961–1962)

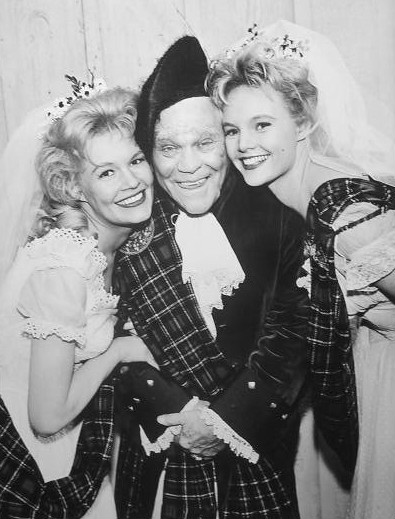
- James Barton with Nan Peterson (left) and Jackie Russell in "The Clan MacDuff" episode, 1962
- Genre: Western
- Created by: Samuel A. Peeples
- Written by: Samuel A. Peeples; Frank Price
- Directed by: Tay Garnett; William Witney
- Starring: J. Pat O'Malley; Chill Wills
- Composer: David Buttolph
- Country of origin: United States
- Original language: English
- No. of seasons: 1
- No. of episodes: 26

Production
- Camera setup: Single-camera
- Running time: 60 minutes
- Production companies: Calliope Productions; Revue Studios

Original release
- Network: CBS
- Release: October 5, 1961 – September 6, 1962

Frontier Circus is an American Western television series about a traveling circus roaming the American West in the 1880s. Filmed by Revue Productions, the program originally aired on CBS from October 5, 1961, until September 20, 1962. It was also shown on the BBC in England.

== Overview ==
The show's setting was the T & T Circus in the late 1800s in the American Southwest. Colonel Casey Thompson, played by Chill Wills, and Ben Travis, played by John Derek, were the co-owners. Richard Jaeckel portrayed Tony Gentry, the circus's scout.

Episodes depicted interactions of circus personnel with each other and with outsiders whom they encountered as they traveled from one town to another via wagon train. (The TV series Wagon Train provided inspiration for Frontier Circus.)

== Guest stars ==
- Claude Akins
- Chris Alcaide
- John Anderson
- Edward Andrews
- R. G. Armstrong
- Eddie Albert
- Parley Baer
- Roy Barcroft
- Don "Red" Barry
- Patricia Barry
- Lane Bradford
- Kathie Browne
- Red Buttons
- Harry Carey Jr.
- Paul Carr
- Albert Cavens
- John Cliff
- Iron Eyes Cody
- John Considine
- Richard Conte
- Ellen Corby
- Alex Cord
- Lloyd Corrigan
- Royal Dano
- Sammy Davis Jr.
- Frank DeKova
- Irene Dunne
- Dan Duryea
- Jena Engstrom
- Jason Evers
- Frank Ferguson
- William Fawcett
- Constance Ford
- James Gregory
- Herman Hack
- Don Haggerty
- Alan Hale Jr.
- Chick Hannan
- Anne Helm
- Chuck Hicks
- Robert Hinkle
- Skip Homeier
- Clegg Hoyt
- Anthony Jochim
- Arte Johnson
- Carolyn Jones
- Henry Jones
- Brian Keith
- Warren J. Kemmerling
- Adam Kennedy
- Jess Kirkpatrick
- Otto Kruger
- Cloris Leachman
- Norman Leavitt
- Bethel Leslie
- George Macready
- Howard McNear
- Vera Miles
- Roger Mobley
- Elizabeth Montgomery
- Jeanette Nolan
- Nehemiah Persoff
- William Phipps
- John Pickard
- Joe Ploski
- Mike Ragan
- Aldo Ray
- Thelma Ritter
- Gilbert Roland
- Mickey Rooney
- Charles Ruggles
- Barbara Rush
- Robert Sampson
- Walter Sande
- Vito Scotti
- Jay Silverheels
- Robert F. Simon
- George Sowards
- Joan Staley
- Stella Stevens
- Barbara Stuart
- Gloria Talbott
- Kenneth Tobey
- Rip Torn
- Jack Tornek
- Jo Van Fleet
- Robert J. Wilke
- H. M. Wynant
- Chief Yowlachie
- Dick York

== Episodes ==
No.	Title	Directed by	Written by	Original release date
1	"The Depths of Fear"	William Witney	Samuel A. Peeples	October 5, 1961
2	"The Smallest Target"	Unknown	Unknown	October 12, 1961
3	"Lippizan"	William Witney	Story by : Dorothy C. Fontana; Teleplay by : Lawrence Kimble	October 19, 1961
4	"Dr. Sam"	John English	Jean Holloway	October 26, 1961
5	"The Hunter and the Hunted"	Alan Crosland Jr.	Frank Price	November 2, 1961
6	"Karina"	Sydney Pollack	Jean Holloway	November 9, 1961
7	"Journey from Hannibal"	Don Weis	Frank Price	November 16, 1961
8	"Winter Quarters"	John English	Steven Thornley	November 23, 1961
9	"The Patriarch of Purgatory"	William Witney	Les Crutchfield	November 30, 1961
10	"The Shaggy Kings"	Richard Irving	Samuel A. Peeples	December 7, 1961
11	"Coals of Fire"	William Witney	Shimon Wincelberg	January 4, 1962
12	"The Balloon Girl"	Gilbert L. Kay	Vince Skarstedt	January 11, 1962
13	"Mr. Grady Regrets"	Don Weis	Lawrence Kimble	January 25, 1962
14	"Quick Shuffle"	Robert Gist	Robert E. Thompson	February 1, 1962
15	"The Courtship"	Hollingsworth Morse	Frank Price	February 15, 1962
16	"Stopover in Paradise"	Earl Bellamy	Bob Barbash	February 22, 1962
17	"Calamity Circus"	Lesley Selander	Frank Price	March 8, 1962
18	"The Inheritance"	Sydney Pollack	Steven Ritch	March 15, 1962
19	"Naomi Champagne"	Don Weis	Steven Ritch	March 29, 1962
20	"Mighty Like Rogues"	Alan Crosland Jr.	Story by : Lawrence Kimble; Teleplay by : Frank Price	April 5, 1962
21	"Never Won Fair Lady"	Hollingsworth Morse	Shimon Wincelberg	April 12, 1962
22	"The Good Fight"	John English	Steven Thornley	April 19, 1962
23	"The Clan MacDuff"	Charles Haas	Story by : Steven Ritch; Teleplay by : Thomas Thompson	April 26, 1962
24	"The Race"	Tay Garnett	Ric Hardman	May 3, 1962
25	"The Daring Durandos"	Robert Gist	Donn Mullally & Lee Erwin	May 17, 1962
26	"Incident at Pawnee Gun"	Sydney Pollack	N.B. Stone Jr.	September 6, 1962

== Production ==
Frontier Circus was produced by Calliope Productions, Incorporated, and filmed by Revue Productions, Incorporated. Samuel A. Peeples created the show and was the producer, and Richard Irving was the executive producer. Directors included Don Weis, William Witney, and Sydney Pollack. David Buttolph and Jeff Alexander composed the music.

Interior shots were filmed on the back lot at Revue's studio. Exterior scenes were filmed at a variety of sites in Nevada and California.

== Schedule ==
Frontier Circus initially was broadcast from 7:30 to 8:30 Eastern Time on Thursdays. In February 1962 it moved to 8-9 p.m. ET on Thursdays. In September 1961 it returned to the original time slot.

== Critical response ==
Richard F. Shepard, writing in The New York Times, described the initial episode as "a cross between an adult Western and a horse-drawn study of mental cases." Noting that the episode dealt with one lion tamer who was an alcoholic and one who was sadistic, he wrote, "If frontier circuses ran on and on like this, it's small wonder that the rodeo caught on out West."

A review of that same episode in the trade publication Variety commented, "The sawdust-and-sagebrush saga is strictly a potboiler, and its only saving grace is that it doesn't pretend to be anything more." It noted the similarity of the show's concept to that of Wagon Train but added, ". . . the similarity ends where script quality begins. This is pure escape stuff . . .".

== Home media ==
Timeless Media Group released the complete series on DVD in Region 1 on April 20, 2010.
