= John Zacherle =

American TV host, voice actor, and recording artist (1918–2016)

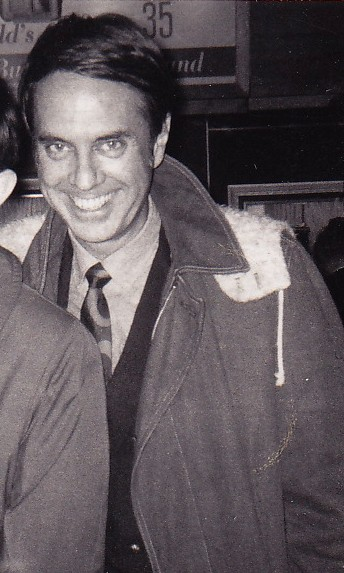
- Zacherle in 1968
- Born: September 26, 1918; Philadelphia, Pennsylvania, U.S.
- Died: October 27, 2016 (aged 98); New York City, U.S.
- Other name: John Zacherley
- Education: University of Pennsylvania (B.A., English Literature, 1940)
- Years active: 1954–2015
- Presenting career
- Show: Shock Theater (1957–58); Zacherley at Large (1959–60)
- Stations: WCAU-TV (1957–58); WABC-TV (1958–60)
- Style: Horror host
- Country: United States

John Zacherle (/ˈzækərliː/ ZAK-ər-lee; sometimes credited as John Zacherley; September 26, 1918 – October 27, 2016) was an American television host, radio personality, singer, and voice actor. He had a long career as a television horror host, broadcasting horror films in Philadelphia and New York City in the 1950s and 1960s. Known for his character of "Roland/Zacherley", he also did voice work for films, and recorded the top ten novelty rock and roll song "Dinner with Drac" in 1958. He also edited two collections of horror stories, Zacherley's Vulture Stew and Zacherley's Midnight Snacks.

== Biography ==
Zacherle was born in Philadelphia, Pennsylvania.

In 1954, he gained his first television role at WCAU-TV in Philadelphia, where he was hired as an actor playing several roles (one was an undertaker) in Action in the Afternoon, a Western produced by the station and aired in the New York City market. Three years later, he was hired as the host of WCAU's Shock Theater, which debuted on October 7, 1957. it was so popular that when Zacherle asked for three human hairs to make a pillow, he received 23,000 replies.

He was a close colleague of Philadelphia broadcaster Dick Clark, and sometimes filled in for Clark on road touring shows of Clark's American Bandstand in the 1960s. Clark reportedly gave Zacherle his nickname of "The Cool Ghoul". In 1958, partly with the assistance and backing of Clark, Zacherle cut Dinner with Drac for Cameo Records, backed by Dave Appell. At first, Clark thought the recording – in which Zacherle recites humorously grisly limericks to rock and roll accompaniment – was too gory to play on Bandstand, and made Zacherle return to the studio to cut a second tamer version. Eventually both versions were released simultaneously as backsides on the same 45, and the record broke the top ten nationally. Zacherle later released several LPs mixing horror sound effects with novelty songs.

=== Move to New York ===
The purchase of WCAU by CBS in 1958 prompted Zacherle to leave Philadelphia for WABC-TV in New York, where the station added a "y" to the end of his name in the credits.

Zacherle in the 1960s

In 1963, he hosted animated cartoons, as well as Chiller Theatre on WPIX-TV.

In 1965, he hosted a teenage dance show for three years at WNJU-TV in Newark called Disc-O-Teen, hosting the show in full costume and using the teenage show participants in his skits.

In December 1968, Zacherle moved to radio as the morning host for progressive rock WNEW-FM. In the summer of 1969, he became the station night broadcaster (10 pm–2 AM); in June 1971, he switched his show to WPLJ-FM, where he stayed for ten years.

On February 14, 1970, he appeared at Fillmore East music hall in New York City to introduce the Grateful Dead; his introduction can be heard on the album Dick's Picks Volume 4.

=== 1980s and beyond ===
In the early 1980s, he played a wizard on Captain Kangaroo, appearing without his Roland/Zacherley costume and make-up. He continued to perform in character at Halloween broadcasts in New York and Philadelphia in the 1980s and 1990s, once narrating Edgar Allan Poe's The Raven while backed up by the Philadelphia Orchestra.

In 1983, he portrayed himself in the feature-length horror comedy Geek Maggot Bingo produced and directed by Nick Zedd in sequences shot in Zacherle's apartment on the Upper West Side.

In 1985, he hosted a special for Newark, New Jersey music video station WWHT U68 entitled "The Thirteenth Hour".

In 1986, he hosted a direct-to-video program called Horrible Horror, where he performed Zacherley monologues in between clips from public domain sci-fi and horror films.

In 1988, he struck up a friendship with B-movie horror director Frank Henenlotter. He voiced the puppet "Aylmer", a slug-like drug-dealing and brain-eating parasite, one of the lead characters in Henenlotter's 1988 horror-comedy film Brain Damage, and made a cameo in his 1990 comedy Frankenhooker, appropriately playing a TV weatherman who specializes in forecasts for mad scientists.

In late 1992, Zacherle joined the staff of "K-Rock", WXRK, at a time when the roster included other free-form radio DJs including Pete Fornatale, Jimmy Fink, Vin Scelsa (with whom he'd worked at WPLJ) and Meg Griffin. For the next four years he hosted a Saturday morning show called "Spirit Of The Sixties". He departed in January 1996 when the station switched to an alternative rock format and hired all new jocks.

In 2010, Zacherle starred in the documentary, The Aurora Monsters: The Model Craze That Gripped the World. The film was written and produced by Dennis Vincent and Cortlandt Hull, owner of the Witch's Dungeon Classic Movie Museum in Bristol, Connecticut. The documentary includes a number of short pieces featuring Zacherly and his puppet co-host Gorgo, of Bill Diamond Productions. The film went on to win a Rondo award.

Zacherle continued to make appearances at conventions through 2015, and his collectibles, including model kits, T-shirts, and posters, continue to sell. The book Goodnight, Whatever You Are by Richard Scrivani, chronicling Zacherle's life, debuted at the Chiller Theatre Expo in Secaucus, New Jersey, in October 2006. Scrivani and Tom Weaver followed it up with the scrapbook-style "The Z Files: Treasures from Zacherley's Archives" in 2012.

The comic book anthology, Zacherley's Midnite Terrors (created by Joseph M. Monks, and featuring top artists like Basil Gogos, Ken Kelly, William Stout and Mike Koneful), was created solely as a tribute to "Zach". Three issues were published, and Zacherley acted in a commercial to promote them.

Zacherle continued to make occasional on-air appearances, usually around Halloween, including a two-hour show at WCBS-FM with Ron Parker on October 31, 2007. (By this point, the 89-year-old was one of the very few people left in radio that was older than the medium itself.) Zacherley and Chiller Theatre returned to the WPIX airwaves on October 25, 2008, for a special showing of the 1955 Universal Pictures science fiction classic Tarantula!.

The Broadcast Pioneers of Philadelphia inducted Zacherle into their Hall of Fame in 2010.

He died on October 27, 2016, at his home in Manhattan at the age of 98.

== Legacy ==
He was the uncle of My Little Pony creator Bonnie Zacherle.

== Partial Zacherley at Large episode guide ==
Channel 9's resident film historian Chris Steinbrunner compiled a listing of all Zacherley's shows from their start to New Year's 1960:

| No. | Title | Original release date |
|---|---|---|
| 1 | "Zombies on Broadway (1945, B&W, RKO, USA)" | October 9, 1959 |
Segments: Zacherley stumbled down into the crypt under Times Square and decides to make his home at Channel 9. The film: Two comics head for the tropics to find a real zombie for their night club act.
| 2 | "Before Dawn" | October 16, 1959 |
Zacherley anxiously awaits the arrival of his wife Isobel, mailed in a packing-case from his old channel. The Film: Warner Oland, Dorothy Wilson, Stu Erwin. A girl with strange psychic powers senses murder and a hidden treasure in an old house. (RKO)
| 3 | "You'll Find Out" | October 23, 1959 |
Using Isobel as a trance medium, Zacherley communicates with the beyond...and some very active ectoplasm. The Film: Boris Karloff, Bela Lugosi, Peter Lorre, Dennis O'Keefe, Kay Kyser, Ginny Simms - A trio of phony spiritualists try to murder a rich old woman and her niece during a seance. (RKO)
| 4 | "Return Of The Vampire" | October 30, 1959 |
Zacherley celebrates that holiday of holidays, All Hallows Eve, with a special radio address by Count Dracula in Transylvania. A pumpkin explodes. The Film: Bela Lugosi, Nina Foch, Frieda Inescort - A vampire comes back from the dead to revenge himself upon an aristocratic family. (Col.)
| 5 | "Murder on a Honeymoon" | November 6, 1959 |
Zacherley decides to put together a brain for the Cardiff Giant, but over-activates the parts. The Film: Edna May Oliver, James Gleason, Lola Lane - A spinster decides to solve the murder that interrupts her vacation. (RKO)
| 6 | "Red Morning" | November 13, 1959 |
Zacherley experiments with a new head-shrinking formula on four volunteer apes; it backfires and an ever-expanding mass of hair threatens to fill the crypt. The Film: Steffi Duna, Regis Toomey - A girl finds adventure, romance and headhunters in the South Seas. (RKO)
| 7 | "Cry of the Werewolf" | November 20, 1959 |
Zacherley campaigns to be chosen leader of the Transylvania gypsies, and is miffed when Isobel is selected Queen of the tribe instead. The Film: Nina Foch, Stephen Crane, Osa Massan. A beautiful gypsy girl turns into a wolf and kills to protect her mother's secret. (Col.)
| 8 | "Bluebeard" | November 27, 1959 |
Zacherley tries to force Isobel to abdicate from gypsy royalty by means of a love potion. When that fails, explosions follow. The Film: John Carradine, Jean Parker, Nils Asther - The police of Paris are baffled by a series of mysterious murders. (C&C)
| 9 | "One Body Too Many" | December 4, 1959 |
Zacherley builds a telescope just in time to do battle with some spores from outer space. The Film: Jack Haley, Jean Parker, Bela Lugosi - An insurance salesman finds himself trapped in a very eccentric household. (Par)
| 10 | "The Mask of Diijon" | December 11, 1959 |
Zacherley puts on a magic show, climaxing it by sawing Isobel in half. The Film: Eric von Stroheim, Jeanne Bates - A once-famous stage magician dabbles in hypnotism and the dark occult. (C&C)
| 11 | "The Woman Who Came Back" | December 18, 1959 |
Zacherley reminisces about prehistoric times with a pasty-faced Glob that dates far, far back. The Film: John Loder, Nancy Kelly, Otto Kruger - The inhabitants of a New England town persecute a bewildered young woman as a witch. (C&C)
| 12 | "Avalanche" | December 26, 1959 |
Zacherley welcomes his always-failing son Gasport home from Transylvania University for the Christmas holidays and opens some rather unusual gifts. The Film: Bruce Cabot, Veda Ann Borg, Roscoe Karns - Federal agents investigate murder at a snowbound mountain lodge. (C&C)

These shows were later syndicated to KHJ-TV, the RKO General station in Los Angeles.

== Short story collections ==
Zacherle edited two short story collections for Ballantine Books in 1960. Listed here are their contents.

- Zacherley's Vulture Stew
  - L. Ron Hubbard, "He Didn't Like Cats"
  - Mindret Lord, "Dr. Jacobus Meliflore's Last Patient"
  - Manly Wade Wellman, "The Devil Is Not Mocked"
  - Donald A. Wollheim, "Bones"
  - Charles R. Tanner, "Out of the Jar"
  - A. E. van Vogt, "The Witch"
  - Anthony Boucher, "They Bite"
  - E. Everett Evans, "The Shed"
  - James Blish, "There Shall Be No Darkness"
- Zacherley's Midnight Snacks
  - Richard Matheson, "Sorry, Right Number"
  - Jerome Bixby and Joe Dean, "Share Alike"
  - Theodore Sturgeon, "Talent"
  - Wallace West, "Listen, Children, Listen"
  - William F. Temple, "The Whispering Gallery"
  - Robert Moore Williams, "The Piping Death"
  - A. E. Van Vogt, "The Ghost"
  - Philip James, "Carillon of Skulls"
  - Henry Kuttner, "Pile of Trouble"

== Discography ==
=== Albums ===
- Spook Along with Zacherley (Elektra: EKL-190) 1960
- Monster Mash (12 songs) (Parkway LP P-7018) 1962
- Scary Tales (Parkway LP P-7023) 1963
- Monster Mash (10 songs; partial re-issue of Parkway album) (Wyncote LP W-9050) 1964

=== Singles ===
- "Igor"/"Dinner with Drac" (Cameo 130-1)
- "Dinner with Drac Pt.1"/"Pt.2" (Cameo 130-2)
- "Eighty-Two Tombstones"/"Lunch with Mother Goose" (Cameo 139)
- "Hurry Burry Baby"/"Dinner With Drac" (Parkway 853)
- "I Was a Teenage Cave Man"/"Dummy Doll" (Cameo 145)
- "Surfboard 109"/"Clementine" (Parkway 885)
- "Scary Tales from Mother Goose"/"Monster Monkey" (Parkway 888)

=== CDs ===
- Twist Collection (OOZ 617) 2001
- Monster Mash/Scary Tales (ACE CDCHD 1294) 2010
- Monster Mash Party (Transylvania 4-5709)
- Dinner With Zach (Transylvania 6-5000)
- Spook Along with Zacherley (Collector's Choice Music)

== See also ==
- Vampira
- Elvira, Mistress of the Dark
- Dr. Gangrene
- Morgus the Magnificent
- Dr. Shock
