= The Palomino =

1950 film by Ray Nazarro

- Theatrical release poster
- Directed by: Ray Nazarro
- Written by: Tom Kilpatrick
- Produced by: Robert Cohn
- Starring: Jerome Courtland; Beverly Tyler; Joseph Calleia; Roy Roberts; Gordon Jones; Robert Osterloh
- Cinematography: Vincent J. Farrar
- Edited by: Aaron Stell
- Production company: Columbia Pictures
- Distributed by: Columbia Pictures
- Release date: March 18, 1950
- Running time: 73 minutes
- Country: United States
- Language: English

The Palomino is a 1950 American Western film directed by Ray Nazarro, written by Tom Kilpatrick and starring Jerome Courtland, Beverly Tyler, Joseph Calleia, Roy Roberts, Gordon Jones and Robert Osterloh. The film was released on March 18, 1950 by Columbia Pictures.

== Cast ==
- Jerome Courtland as Steve Norris
- Beverly Tyler as Maria Guevara
- Joseph Calleia as Miguel Gonzales
- Roy Roberts as Ben Lane
- Gordon Jones as Bill Hennessey
- Robert Osterloh as Sam Drake
- Tom Trout as Williams
- Harry Garcia as Johnny
- Trevor Bardette as Brown
- Juan Duval as Manuel
- Sam Flint as Veterinarian

== See also ==
- List of films about horses
