= Jena Engstrom =

American former television actress

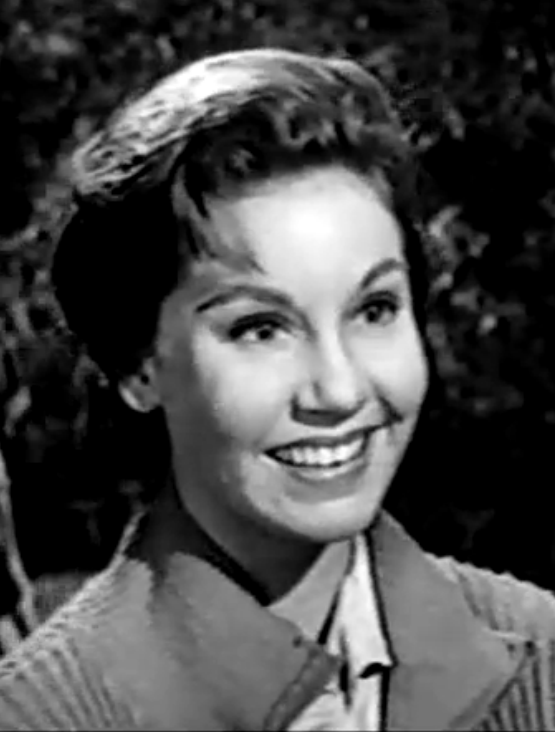
- Jena Engstrom as Betty on the April 19, 1961 episode of The Adventures of Ozzie and Harriet titled "Selling Rick's Drums"
- Occupation: Actress
- Years active: 1960–1964
- Parent: Jean Engstrom

Jena Engstrom is an American former television actress. She appeared in more than three dozen episodes of various television series from 1960 to 1964.

== Career ==
Jena Engstrom began acting after graduating from high school and first appeared on television in the 1960 episode "Adopted" of the ABC crime drama, The Detectives Starring Robert Taylor. She appeared in 37 television programs before making her final appearance opposite guest star Robert Culp in the 1964 episode, "The Stallion," of NBC's The Virginian. She played a girl who had a crush on Steve Douglas in an October 19, 1961 episode of My Three Sons.

=== Mother and daughter ===
Jena Engstrom is the daughter of actress Jean Engstrom whose television career (1955–1966) overlapped her daughter's and whose career also included movie and regional stage appearances. Most online databases and this article have listed only two of the three TV shows in which they appeared together.

The first of the two shows listed is the April 1961 episode of the CBS program Rawhide titled "Incident of the Lost Idol" in which they appeared as mother and daughter. They had only one brief scene together as the story was not about their relationship.

The second show listed is the January 1962 episode "To Sell Another Human Being" of ABC's The New Breed, starring Leslie Nielsen, in which mother Jean played a wealthy woman who with her husband (played by Richard Arlen) adopt a baby through an adoption mill. The police get involved when the baby's natural mother, played by daughter Jena, tries to get her baby back.

The third television show in which they appeared together is an unidentified 30-minute religious program presented in 1961 in which they played mother and daughter. In this story a girl (Jena) has trouble relating to her parents until a session with teenagers at a church is recorded and the recording made available to the parents to listen to. Appearing in this show with Jean and Jena Engstrom are Robert Stevenson as Jena's father and Richard Evans as her boyfriend. This film, minus the opening and closing credits, has been posted on-line.

=== Western series ===
Twenty-one of Engstrom's thirty-seven roles were in television westerns. She appeared three times each on Have Gun, Will Travel, and Wagon Train, as well as Rawhide, twice each on Bonanza, Gunsmoke, and Laramie, and once each on The Tall Man, Death Valley Days, Frontier Circus, and Outlaws, as well as her final performance as an actress in The Virginian.

In "The Education of Sarah Jane" episode of Have Gun, Will Travel, Engstrom appeared as Sarah Jane. In the "Milly" episode of Gunsmoke, she played Milly Glover. In the episode "Chester’s Indian", Engstrom plays Callie Dill. In 1962, in one of her three appearances on Rawhide, she had the title role of "The Child-Woman" in an episode. In 1961, she portrayed Laurie Manson in "The Incident of the Lost Idol". She retired from acting in 1964, not long after appearing on Wagon Train and in an episode of Perry Mason in which she plays Vera Janel in "The Case of the Illicit Illusion". Her final television appearance was on The Virginian in an episode broadcast in September 1964, "The Stallion".

=== Illness ===
Engstrom left acting in 1964, possibly because of health considerations. In 1963, she was cast in what was to have been a recurring role of Jennie in the series The Travels of Jaimie McPheeters, starring Kurt Russell, but had to give up the role because of illness and was replaced by Donna Anderson.

In June 1964, she was replaced again because of ill health by Davey Davison in the episode "Children of Calamity" of Richard Crenna's CBS drama series, Slattery's People.

=== Confused credits ===
The acting credits of mother Jean and daughter Jena were confused at the time they were active in the business resulting in mixed credits in newspapers and problems with pay checks. For a long time the credits were confused on many Internet databases, and while some errors still exist, many have been corrected.

=== DVDs ===
Several of the television series listed below have been released by their studios on DVDs that are available for sale or for rent.

=== Television Roles ===
Note: "Episode" column: 2.9 indicates Season 2, Episode 9, etc.

AIR DATE	SHOW	EPISODE	EPISODE TITLE	CHARACTER	NOTES	DVD
Nov. 25, 1960	The Detectives Starring Robert Taylor	2.9	"Adopted"	Ann Martin	1st of 2 appearances on this show.	
Feb. 5, 1961	Shirley Temple Theatre	2.19	"The Fawn"	Kathy		
Feb. 25, 1961	Have Gun, Will Travel	4.23	"Fatal Flaw"	Cassandra Langford	1st of 3 appearances on this show.	Yes
Mar. 14, 1961	The Red Skelton Hour	10.17	"Freddy and the Baby"	Young Woman (Baby's Mother)		Yes
Apr. 19, 1961	The Adventures of Ozzie and Harriet	9.30	"Selling Rick's Drums"	Betty Hamilton		Yes
Apr. 28, 1961	Rawhide	3.24	"Incident of the Lost Idol"	Laurie Manson	1st of 3 appearances on this show. Mother Jean Engstrom also appears in this episode.	Yes
Jun. 11, 1961	The Asphalt Jungle	1.11	"The Kidnapping"	Karen Meriden		
Sep. 23, 1961	Have Gun, Will Travel	5.2	"The Education of Sarah Jane"	Sarah Jane Darrow	2nd of 3 appearances on this show.	Yes
Oct. 1, 1961	Bonanza	3.2	"Springtime"	Ann	1st of 2 appearances on this show.	Yes
Oct. 12, 1961	My Three Sons	2.3	"The Crush"	Mary Beth Jackson		Yes
Oct. 14, 1961	The Tall Man	2.6	"An Item for Auction"	Mary Susan Naylack		Yes
Oct. 23, 1961	Death Valley Days	10.7	"Storm Over Truckee"	Maggie Woolf	Billed as Jenna Engstrom.	
Oct. 30, 1961	The Everglades	1.4	"Primer for Pioneers"	Memory Jacks	The series is listed as "Everglades!" in the opening credits.	
Nov. 1, 1961	Wagon Train	5.6	"The Jenna Douglas Story"	Sue Thompson		Yes
Nov. 2, 1961	Outlaws	2.5	"The Night Riders"	Louise Nichols		
Nov. 25, 1961	Gunsmoke	7.9	"Milly"	Milly Glover	1st of 2 appearances on this show.	Yes
Dec. 26, 1961	Laramie	3.13	"The Lawless Seven"	Ginny Hawks	1st of 2 appearances on this show.	Yes
Jan. 16, 1962	The New Breed	1.16	"To Sell Another Human Being"		Mother Jean Engstrom also appears in this episode.	
Mar. 2, 1962	The Detectives Starring Robert Taylor	3.20	"Night Boat"	Frances	2nd of 2 appearances on this show.	
Mar. 14, 1962	Wagon Train	5.24	"The Amos Billings Story"	Loan	2nd of 2 appearances on this show.	Yes
Mar. 17, 1962	Have Gun, Will Travel	5.26	"Alice"	Maya Ferguson	3rd of 3 appearances on this show.	Yes
Mar. 23, 1962	Rawhide	4.24	"The Child-Woman"	Posie Mushgrove	2nd of 3 appearances on this show.	Yes
Apr. 5, 1962	Frontier Circus	1.20	"Mighty Like Rogues"	Betsy Ross Jukes		Yes
May 12, 1962	Gunsmoke	7.32	"Chester's Indian"	Callie Dill	2nd of 2 appearances on this show.	Yes
Oct. 26, 1962	Rawhide	5.5	"Incident of the Four Horsemen"	Amy Galt	3rd of 3 appearances on this show.	Yes
Nov. 5,1962	Stoney Burke	1.6	"A Matter of Pride"	Meryle Hill		Yes
Nov. 13, 1962	Laramie	4.7	"The Sunday Shoot"	Nancy Tilford	2nd of 2 appearances on this show.	Yes
Dec. 2, 1962	Bonanza	4.10	"The Deadly Ones"	Molly Reed	2nd of 2 appearances on this show.	Yes
Jan. 11, 1963	Route 66	3.16	"You Can't Pick Cotton in Tahiti"	Elva Dupree		Yes
Feb. 7, 1963	Dr. Kildare	2.18	"Good Luck Charm"	Marcia Laverly		Yes
Apr. 17, 1963	The Eleventh Hour	1.27	"Try to Keep Alive Until Next Tuesday"	Marian Snyder		Yes
May 23, 1963	The Doctors and the Nurses	1.30	"Bitter Pill"	Jean Wheeler	The show was called The Nurses during the first season.	
Sep 15, 1963	The Travels of Jaimie McPheeters	1.1	"The Day of Leaving"	Jennie	Jena Engstrom was replaced after this pilot episode because of illness	
Feb. 7, 1964	77 Sunset Strip	6.20	"Queen of the Cats"	Marian Armstrong	Final episode of this series.77 Sunset Strip	
Mar. 30, 1964	Wagon Train	7.20	"The Santiago Quesada Story"	Kim Case	3rd of 3 appearances on this show.	Yes
Apr. 9, 1964	Perry Mason	7.25	"The Case of the Ilicit Illusion"	Vera Janel		Yes
Sep. 30, 1964	The Virginian	3.3	"The Black Stallion"	Jodie Wingate	Episode also called "The Stallion"	Yes
