= Cooler (disambiguation) =

A cooler is a cool box; a device, container, or room that cools or keeps its contents cool.

Cooler or The Cooler may also refer to:

== Alternate terms for ==
- Refrigerator
- Prison
- Bouncer (doorman)

== Industry and technology ==
- Water cooler, a device that cools and dispenses water
- Evaporative cooler, a type of humidifier used in place of an air conditioner
- Cooler (oil), a radiator to cool engine oil in an engine
- Computer cooler, the system for cooling of computer components
  - Laptop cooler, a pad or mat for cooling laptop or notebook computers
- Intercooler, an air-to-air or air-to-liquid heat exchange device

== Entertainment and recreation ==
- Cooler, in poker terminology, a strong poker hand that loses to a stronger one
- Cooler (or C**ler), a 1996 album by Collapsed Lung
- Cooler (Dragon Ball), a fictional character in Dragonball Z movies
- The Cooler, a 1974 spy novel by George Markstein
- The Cooler, a 2003 American film
- "The Cooler" (Adventure Time), a 2014 TV episode
- The Cooler (night club), a music and performance venue in New York City

== Food and beverage ==
- Wine cooler, an alcoholic beverage made from wine and fruit juice
- Alcopop (alternative name in Canada)
- Boston cooler, ginger ale and vanilla ice cream
- Sherbet cooler, sherbet, vanilla syrup, and seltzer water

== See also ==
- Chiller (disambiguation)
- Air conditioning
