= Crematia Mortem =

Crematia Mortem (™) was the horror host of KSHB 41's late night weekend television show Creature Feature in Kansas City, Missouri, United States, from 1981 to 1990. Nicknamed "The Ghostess with the Mostess", she was the creation of Roberta Solomon (a local television and radio talent). The "Creature Feature" heavily emphasized camp, beginning with a spooky opening theme written by KSHB-TV’s Creative Services Director, Rob Forsythe. The set consisted of a dark backdrop, adorned with creepy knickknacks and Gothic candelabras, and a coffee-table topped with Halloween decorations. Crematia usually emerged from an upright coffin and walked barefoot to a large wicker chair, from which she presided over the evening's (B movies) feature. Wry commentary and gags preceded or followed commercial breaks, making for about an hour-and-a-half to two hour show. Crematia parodied an aristocratic English accent and always wore a long black wig, pale make-up, and a black gown with a purple, red, or blue satin corset.

On October 9, 1986, KSHB became a charter affiliate of the Fox Broadcasting Company. As Fox began to provide more content to the station,"Creature Feature's" time slot was pushed back from 10:30 pm to midnight, or even later. Because the audience changed and her voice work was becoming more demanding, Solomon decided it was time for Crematia to step into her coffin for a long rest. Crematia’s last on-air appearance was January, 1990.

Despite the show’s end, Crematia Mortem gained cult status and, in 2012, was inducted into Horrorhound Magazine’s “TV Horror Host Hall of Fame," along with Elvira, Joe Bob Briggs and Universal’s “Shock” Movie Package.
