= Dinner with Drac =

1958 novelty song by John Zacherle

"Dinner with Drac" is a 1958 novelty song by American radio and TV presenter John Zacherle, released on Cameo-Parkway Records. It was his biggest hit and is widely considered his signature song. Zacherle later released several LPs mixing horror sound effects with novelty songs, like "82 Tombstones", "Monster Mash", "Lunch with Mother Goose", "I Was a Teenage Caveman", and "Dinner with Zach", none of which enjoyed the same success.

== Background ==
In 1958, partly with the assistance and backing of Dick Clark, Zacherle cut "Dinner with Drac" for Cameo Records, backed by Dave Appell. The lyrics, all delivered as limericks, describe how Zacherle has dinner with Count Dracula, but finds it strange that "dinner was served for three", only to find out that "the main course was me!" Zacherle describes all the occult and eerie things he saw during their meal, while trying to keep the conversation going. Zacherle closes the song off with the catchphrase from his TV show, "Goodnight, whatever you are!"

The song features background music by Appell and his band. "Dinner with Drac" was originally the B-side to another song by Zacherle, "Igor", about the stereotypical hunchbacked assistant in many Dracula and Frankenstein movies. At first, Clark thought the recording – in which Zacherle recites humorously grisly limericks to rock and roll accompaniment – was too gory to play on American Bandstand, and made Zacherle return to the studio to cut a second tamer version. Eventually, the single was released with "Igor" removed, and instead both versions of "Dinner with Drac" released as respectively an A-side and B-side on the same 45. The record broke the top ten nationally, peaking at No. 6.

== Reception ==
The song charted on the Billboard Pop Singles chart the same year, where it peaked at No. 6.

When Dick Clark played it on American Bandstand, he requested that Zacherle record a less-violent version.

"Dinner with Drac" was banned by the BBC in 1958 for being too scary for young listeners.

== Cover versions ==
In 1963, "Dinner with Drac" was covered by the Dutch band ZZ en De Maskers as "Dracula". Claw Boys Claw also released a cover in 1989, also titled "Dracula". In 1992, The Fuzztones covered the song.

== Sources ==
- Scivally, Bruce (2015). Dracula FAQ (Kindle ed.). Backbeat Books. ISBN 9781617136009.
