= Voodoo Island =

1957 film by Reginald LeBorg

- Theatrical release poster
- Directed by: Reginald LeBorg
- Written by: Richard H. Landau
- Produced by: Howard W. Koch
- Starring: Boris Karloff; Beverly Tyler; Murvyn Vye; Elisha Cook Jr.
- Cinematography: William Margulies
- Edited by: John F. Schreyer
- Music by: Les Baxter
- Production company: Bel-Air Productions
- Distributed by: United Artists
- Release date: February 1957 (U.S.)
- Running time: 82 minutes
- Country: United States
- Language: English
- Budget: $150,000

Voodoo Island is a 1957 American horror film directed by Reginald LeBorg and written by Richard H. Landau. The film stars Boris Karloff, with a cast including Elisha Cook Jr., Beverly Tyler and Rhodes Reason. It is set in the South Pacific and was filmed on Kauaʻi, Hawaii back to back with Jungle Heat. Adam West appears in a small pre-"Batman" uncredited role (his first film role).

Voodoo Island was released theatrically in February 1957 by United Artists on a double bill with Pharaoh's Curse.

== Plot ==
Property developers looking for the ideal South Pacific location for the new Paradise Carlton hotel, discover instead an island populated by carnivorous plants and zombies.

== Cast ==
- Boris Karloff as Phillip Knight
- Beverly Tyler as Sarah Adams
- Murvyn Vye as Barney Finch
- Elisha Cook Jr. as Martin Schuyler (as Elisha Cook)
- Rhodes Reason as Matthew Gunn
- Jean Engstrom as Claire Winter
- Friedrich von Ledebur as Native Chief (as Frederich Ledebur)
- Glenn Dixon as Mitchell
- Owen Cunningham as Howard Carlton
- Herbert Patterson as Dr. Wilding
- Jerry Frank as Vickers
- Adam West as Weather Station #4 Radio Operator (uncredited)

== Production ==
Voodoo Island was Adam West's first appearance in a film. Howard W. Koch and Aubrey Schenck's Bel-Air Productions signed Boris Karloff for a three-picture deal with Voodoo Island being the first film in the contract. The budget was estimated at around $150,000.

== Release ==
Voodoo Island was released theatrically by United Artists on a double bill with Pharaoh's Curse in February 1957, and released a premiere in San Francisco, California on March 8, 1957. The film was later re-titled Silent Death for a very brief 1963 theatrical re-release, sharing the bill with The Black Sleep (1956), a film which is also known as Dr. Cadman's Secret.

=== Home media ===
On September 20, 2005, MGM (which owns United Artists) released Voodoo Island and The Four Skulls of Jonathan Drake together in a DVD double bill, marking the film's home media debut. The film was later released by Willette Acquisition Corp. on November 25, 2014.

== Reception ==
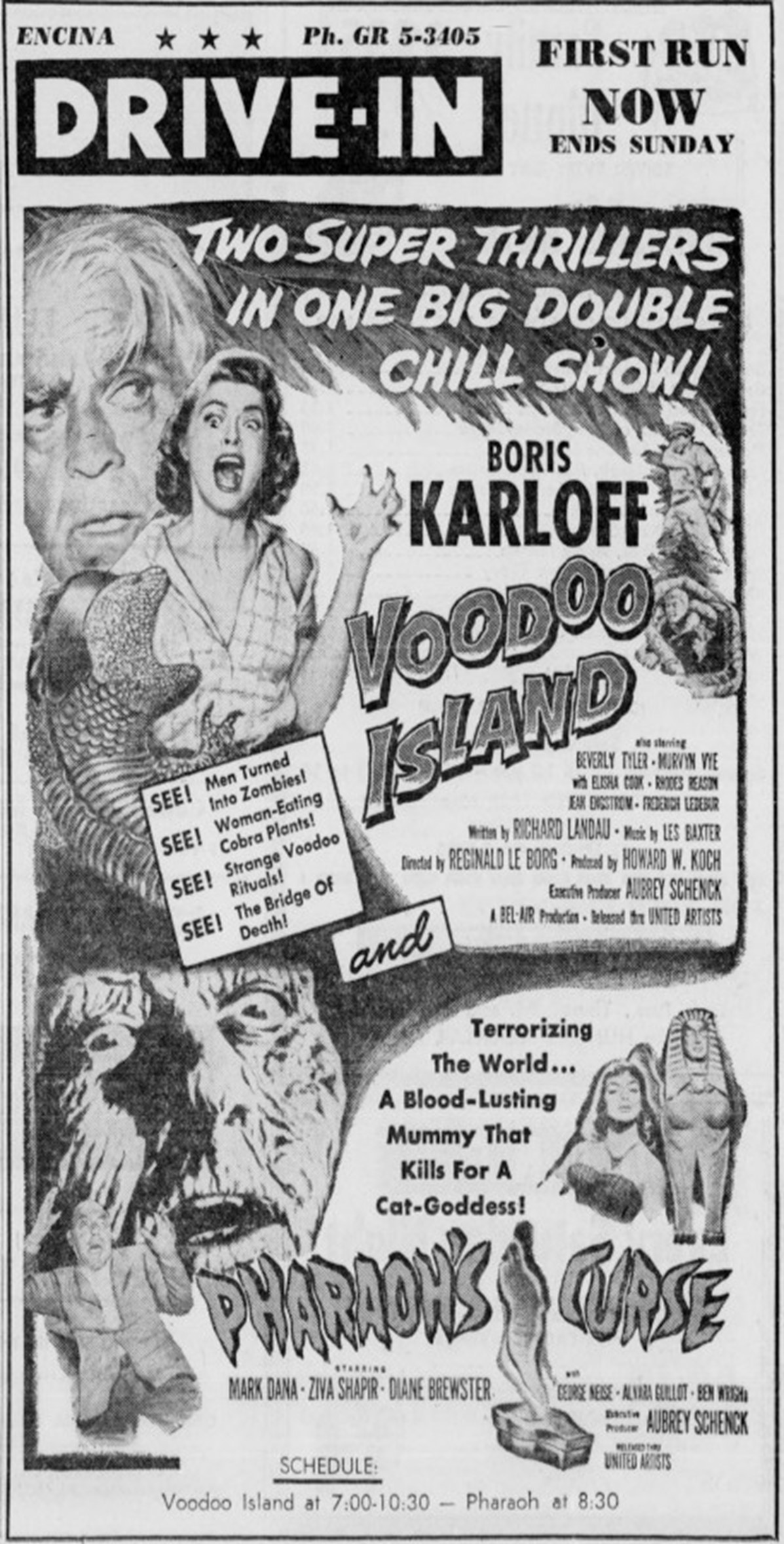
Drive-in advertisement from 1957 for Voodoo Island and co-feature, Pharaoh's Curse.

Amongst reviews at the time of release, the reviewer for Variety wrote: "the thriller gimmicks come off with the desired impact under Reginald LeBorg's direction"; while The Motion Picture Exhibitor wrote that the film "may scare the kiddies and please the addicts of such entries", though concluded that "The cast is fair, the direction and production average, and the story of medium interest." Later, the film critic Leonard Maltin awarded the film two out of a possible four stars, calling it "boring"; and TV Guide gave it one out of five stars, calling it "a terrible film." On his website Fantastic Movie Musings and Ramblings, Dave Sindelar criticized the film's dialogue as "painfully self-conscious", LeBorg's direction, and Karloff's "clumsy" performance; although he also stated that the actor's presence helped the film. Sindelar also noted that the film managed to avoid the usual voodoo cliches, and enjoyed the killer plants, concluding "This is just one of those movies that calls for a little patience."

Dennis Schwartz from Dennis Schwartz Movie Reviews awarded the film a grade C, calling it "An unconvincing and dull horror story that has a hokey payoff", and criticized the film's lack of a good story, shallow acting, and flatness that prevented it from providing enough thrills. Bruce Eder from Allmovie gave the film a mostly negative review, writing, "Reginald LeBorg's Voodoo Island is one of those movies that used to get shown on late-night local television – ostensibly a horror movie, it didn't have quite enough scares or good visual monsters to rate a place on "Chiller Theatre", but it was unsettling enough in some of its details to get attention."
