= The New Breed (TV series) =

American TV crime drama series (1961–1962)

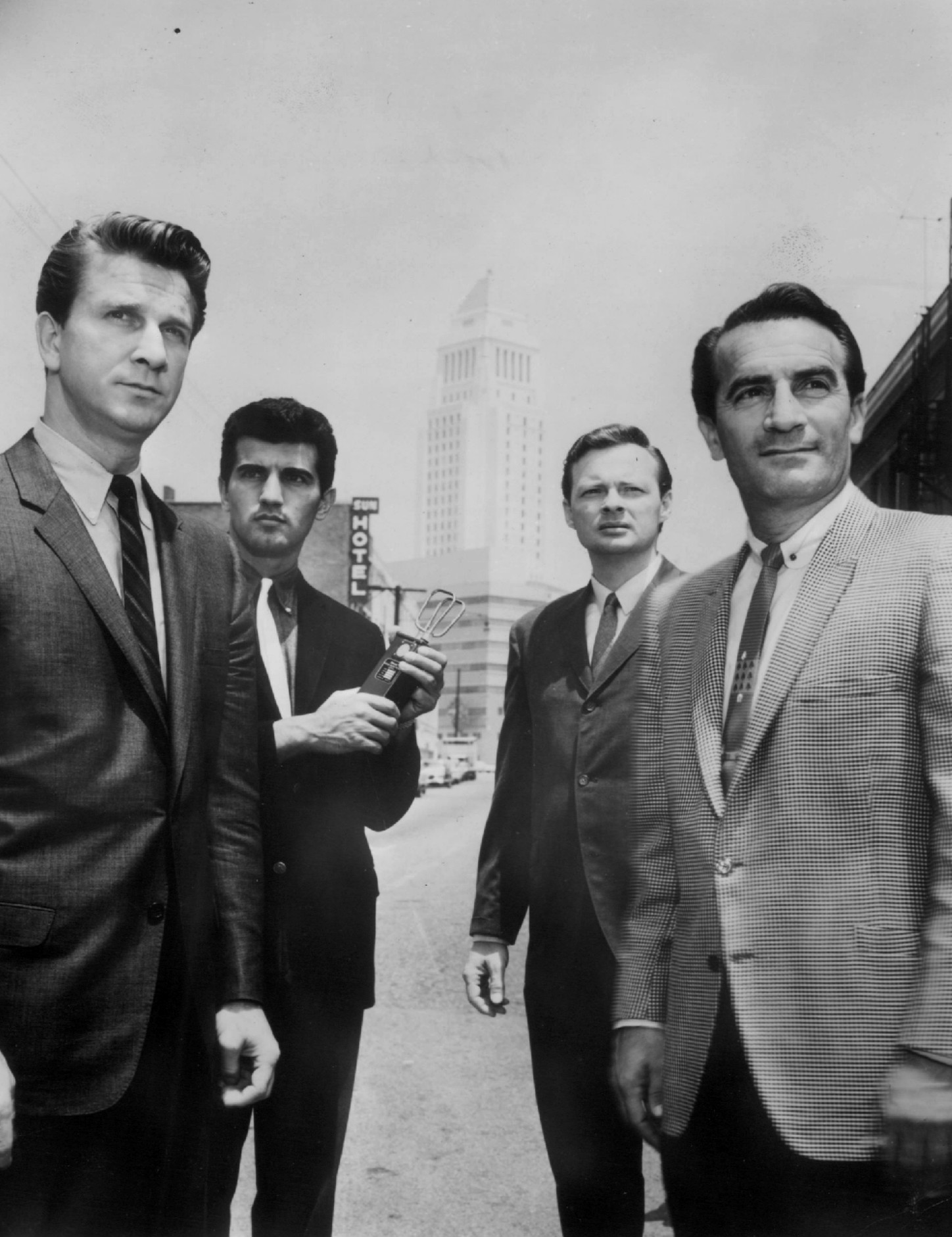
- Main cast members Leslie Nielsen, Greg Roman, John Clarke, and John Beradino in the October 1, 1961 series premiere "No Fat Cops"
- Genre: Crime drama
- Created by: Hank Searls
- Written by: Don Brinkley; Peter B. Germano; Jesse L. Lasky, Jr. Pat Lasky
- Directed by: Walter Grauman; Jerry Hopper; Allen H. Miner; Joseph Pevney; Pat Silver-Lasky; Hank Searls; Sheldon Stark
- Starring: Leslie Nielsen; John Clarke; John Beradino; Byron Morrow; Greg Roman
- Theme music composer: Dominic Frontiere
- Country of origin: United States
- Original language: English
- No. of seasons: 1
- No. of episodes: 36

Production
- Executive producer: Quinn Martin
- Producer: Walter Grauman
- Running time: 60 minutes (approx)

Original release
- Network: ABC
- Release: October 3, 1961 – September 25, 1962

The New Breed is an American crime drama series that aired on ABC from October 3, 1961, to September 25, 1962, with thirty-six episodes. It was broadcast on Tuesdays, initially from 9 to 10 p.m. Eastern Time and then (beginning in November 1961) from 8:30 to 9:30 p.m. E. T. The series was a QM Production in association with Selmur Productions, Inc.

== Synopsis ==
The title was derived from the fact that the main characters formed "a 'new breed' of policeman". They used electronic equipment to locate criminals who had evaded detection by customary police techniques.

The series stars Leslie Nielsen as the serious Lieutenant Price Adams who worked on "The Hot Shot Detail" of the LAPD's Metro Squad and former Major League Baseball player John Beradino as Sergeant Vince Cavelli. The script for the first episode, "No Fat Cops," was written by Hank Searls, credited as the creator of the series. Searls also wrote an original novel based on the series under the pseudonym "Lee Costigan."

The New Breed was the first independent production of Quinn Martin under his newly established company, QM Productions. Prior to starting his own production company, Martin had produced The Untouchables for Desilu Productions, and Nielsen was cast for the role of Adams because of a guest appearance he had made on that program in the episode titled "Three Thousand Suspects." The show was scheduled against The Red Skelton Show and Ichabod and Me on CBS and The Dick Powell Show on NBC, and was canceled after one season.

== Cast ==
- Leslie Nielsen as Lieutenant Price Adams
- John Beradino as Sergeant Vince Cavelli
- John Clarke as Patrolman Joe Huddleston (27 episodes)
- Byron Morrow as Captain Keith Gregory (2 episodes)
- Greg Roman as Patrolman Pete Garcia (2 episodes)
- Art Gilmore as Narrator

=== Notable guest stars ===
- Stanley Adams
- Eddie Albert
- Robert Anderson
- Martin Balsam
- Ed Begley
- Bea Benaderet
- Robert Blake
- Charles Bronson
- Victor Buono
- Yvonne Craig
- Ivan Dixon
- Jena Engstrom
- Peter Falk
- Peter Fonda
- Anne Francis
- Gloria Grahame
- James Gregory
- Joan Hackett
- Eileen Heckart
- Ron Howard
- Sherry Jackson
- Vivi Janiss
- Victor Jory
- Jack Klugman
- Cloris Leachman
- John Larch
- Tina Louise
- Strother Martin
- Patty McCormack
- Dina Merrill
- Vic Morrow
- Barry Morse
- Jack Oakie
- Simon Oakland
- Arthur O'Connell
- Nehemiah Persoff
- Barney Phillips
- Sydney Pollack
- Robert Redford
- Chris Robinson
- Telly Savalas
- William Schallert
- William Swan
- Joan Tompkins
- Fritz Weaver
- William Windom
- Keenan Wynn

== Episodes ==
No.	Title	Directed by	Written by	Original release date
1	"No Fat Cops"	Walter Grauman	Hank Searls	October 3, 1961
A mentally disturbed individual seeks to gain revenge against another man by kidnapping the man's young daughter.
2	"Prime Target"	Allen H. Miner	Jerry Sohl	October 10, 1961
The Met Squad only has a small clue to work with in finding a sniper who shoots at religious objects.
3	"Death of a Ghost"	Unknown	Unknown	October 17, 1961
Adams becomes emotionally involved in the midst of investigating a hit-and-run case.
4	"To None a Deadly Drug"	Allen H. Miner	William Templeton	October 24, 1961
The search is on for a woman who was given a lethal dose of a prescription drug by mistake.
5	"The Compulsion to Confess"	Walter Grauman	David Z. Goodman	October 31, 1961
Adams delves into psychology during an investigation of two crimes at an electronics plant.
6	"Til Death Do Us Part"	Walter E. Grauman	Unknown	November 7, 1961
While solving the murder of an unknown domestic worker, Adams ends up saving a marriage.
7	"The Butcher"	Unknown	Unknown	November 14, 1961
Adams gets a tip in his search for a missing woman who is seeking to have an abortion.
8	"Wave Goodbye to Grandpa"	Walter E. Grauman	Unknown	November 21, 1961
The mysterious death of a maid in a fall at a rest home triggers an investigation by the Met Squad.
9	"Sweet Bloom of Death"	Andrew McCullough	Unknown	November 28, 1961
The clock is ticking as the Met Squad has just three hours to find an antidote for an unknown poison in order to save a child's life.
10	"The Valley of the 3 Charlies"	Allen H. Miner	Jesse Lasky Jr. & Pat Silver	December 5, 1961
Once again saddled with a minimum of clues, the Met Squad still manages to solve a bank robbery, save a kidnapped girl's life and catch a murderer.
11	"Lady Killer"	Walter Grauman	Alfred Brenner	December 12, 1961
The Met Squad makes an appeal to the general public in an attempt to capture a maniacal criminal assaulter.
12	"Blood Money"	Unknown	Unknown	December 19, 1961
The attempted suicide of a girl leads the Met Squad to disclose evidence in order to convict a phony doctor.
13	"I Remember Murder"	Unknown	Unknown	December 26, 1961
The Met Squad attempt to discern the connection between two deaths that take place on a Hollywood sound stage.
14	"The All-American Boy"	Unknown	Unknown	January 2, 1962
While on stakeout duty, Adams seriously wounds an honor student.
15	"Cross the Little Line"	Walter Grauman	Story by : Theodore Apstein; Teleplay by : Theodore Apstein & William Templeton	January 9, 1962
In order to capture the head of a major narcotics ring, Garcia goes undercover as a heroin dealer.
16	"To Sell a Human Being"	Allen H. Miner	Unknown	January 16, 1962
During the investigation of a kidnapping, the Met Squad stumbles onto an illegal adoption ring.
17	"Care is No Cure"	Unknown	Unknown	January 23, 1962
The Met Squad faces nearly insurmountable odds in trying to locate a typhoid carrier.
18	"Policeman Die Alone: Part 1"	Unknown	Unknown	January 30, 1962
After a detective is killed while alone on a stakeout, Adams faces possible dismissal from the police force.
19	"Policeman Die Alone: Part 2"	Unknown	Unknown	February 6, 1962
A conscience-stricken witness comes forward to help the Met Squad in tracking down the hired killer of a detective.
20	"Mr. Weltschmerz"	Joseph Pevney	Unknown	February 13, 1962
The search is on for a retiree who is sending out bombs in the mail to employees of his old firm that are nearing retirement age.
21	"Wings for a Plush Horse"	Unknown	Unknown	February 20, 1962
A stormy poet-playwright whose life is being threatened, but makes like difficult for the Met Squad assigned to protect him.
22	"How Proud the Guilty"	Unknown	Unknown	February 27, 1962
After Adams' daughter is found to be in possession of an objectionable book, Price seeks to balance his search for the source with maintaining his daughter's respect.
23	"The Torch"	Allen H. Miner	William Templeton	March 6, 1962
An investigation into a series of fires leads the Met Squad to conclude that a hired arsonist is behind the crimes.
24	"All the Dead Faces"	Walter Grauman	Stanford Whitmore	March 13, 1962
Adams attempts to rehabilitate his Korean War commanding officer, who is now a guilt-ridden derelict.
25	"The Deadlier Sex"	Joseph Pevney	Story by : Geneviève Manceron; Teleplay by : Don Brinkley	March 20, 1962
After a payroll thief is shot, the Met Squad searches for a number of suspects, all of them women.
26	"Edge of Violence"	Unknown	Unknown	March 27, 1962
A search is conducted by the Met Squad to find a gunman who has been shooting young adult delinquents.
27	"Echoes of Hate"	Joseph Pevney	Pat Silver	April 3, 1962
A German-American is blamed by a Norwegian family for the death of their brother and son.
28	"The Man with the Other Face"	Walter Grauman	Sheldon Stark	April 10, 1962
Cavelli becomes personally involved when a friend from his childhood tells him that she thinks that her husband will harm her.
29	"Thousands and Thousands of Miles"	Joseph Pevney	Don Brinkley	April 17, 1962
Due to her parents' dislike of her boyfriend, a girl steals jewelry and silverware from the family home to finance the couple's elopement.
30	"Hail, Hail, The Gang's All Here"	Walter Grauman	Jesse Lasky Jr. & Pat Silver	April 24, 1962
The death of a young girl from a fall at a convention hotel leads the Met Squad to investigate what happened.
31	"My Brother's Keeper"	Unknown	Unknown	May 1, 1962
After arresting a young troublemaker, Cavelli finds his reputation at stake.
32	"A Motive Named Walter"	Unknown	Unknown	May 8, 1962
The Met Squad seeks to discover the identity of a woman who purchases store items on credit and forges other customers' names.
33	"Wherefore Art Thou, Romeo?"	Unknown	Unknown	May 15, 1962
A charming man who sweeps lovelorn women off their feet before killing them is the object of the Met Squad.
34	"Judgment at San Belito"	Unknown	Unknown	May 22, 1962
The Met Squad becomes involved with a man who's suffering persecution for unknown reasons.
35	"So Dark the Night"	Walter E. Grauman	Peter B. Germano	May 29, 1962
An arson attempt leads the Met Squad to help a couple understand the plight of a intellectually disabled son.
36	"Walk This Street Lightly"	Jerry Hopper	Jesse Lasky Jr. & Pat Silver	June 5, 1962
The theft of $750,000 in negotiable securities is masterminded by an art patron.
