= Chiller Thriller =

Chiller Thriller was a kid-friendly horror showcase that aired on New York City television station WOR-TV (Channel 9) on Saturday mornings as early as 1974 and as late as 1977.

== Background ==
It aired classic movies from the Universal and RKO vaults, as well as films from other studios. It had no connection with the more famous movie program Chiller on WPIX-TV, despite the similar-sounding titles.

Ted Mallie was the off-screen announcer for most of its run, vocal Group "Children of the Night" with Mark Andrews performed Commercial breaks.

"Chiller Thriller" was also the title of a Saturday night movie on defunct station KCND-TV from as early as 1970 until the station went off the air in 1975. It was on at 10 or 10:30 PM at various times. A day before KCND went off the air, the final movie was on August 30, 1975 and entitled "It Conquered the World" starring Peter Graves and Beverly Garland.

== Movies ==
Some movies that were shown were:

- Atom Age Vampire
- Bela Lugosi Meets a Brooklyn Gorilla
- The Body Snatcher (1945)
- The Disembodied (1957)
- Frankenstein Meets the Wolf Man
- The Gamma People
- Ghidrah, the Three-Headed Monster
- Godzilla's Revenge
- Godzilla vs. the Sea Monster
- I Married a Monster From Outer Space
- The Invisible Man Returns
- It Came from Beneath the Sea
- It Came From Outer Space
- King Kong vs. Godzilla
- The Leopard Man
- Man Beast (1956)
- The Man Who Could Work Miracles
- The Man Who Turned to Stone
- The Monolith Monsters
- Monster on the Campus
- Son of Dracula
- Son of Frankenstein
- Son of Godzilla
- The Return of Dracula
- Ring of Terror
- Things to Come (1936)
- The Werewolf (1956)
