= Hong Kong Confidential (1958 film) =

1958 film by Edward L. Cahn

- Film poster
- Directed by: Edward L. Cahn
- Screenplay by: Orville H. Hampton
- Produced by: Robert E. Kent
- Starring: Gene Barry; Beverly Tyler; Allison Hayes
- Cinematography: Kenneth Peach
- Edited by: Edward Mann
- Music by: Emil Newman
- Production company: Vogue Pictures
- Distributed by: United Artists
- Release date: October 1958
- Running time: 67 minutes
- Country: United States
- Language: English

Hong Kong Confidential is a 1958 American film noir crime film directed by Edward L. Cahn starring Gene Barry, Beverly Tyler and Allison Hayes.

== Plot ==
Agent Casey Reed is tasked to find a missing prince (played by an un-credited Michael Barry) of the small Arab nation Thamen who was kidnapped by Communists who want to prevent him from signing an agreement that would allow the United States build a missile base there. Reed masquerades as a singer in a nightclub, but he is captured by the Communists, who plan to kill the two of them in order to blame the kidnapping on the Americans.

== Cast ==
- Gene Barry as Agent Casey Reed
- Beverly Tyler as Fay Wells
- Allison Hayes as Elena Martine
- Ed Kemmer as Frank Paige
- Michael Pate as John Blanchard
- Rico Alaniz as Fernando
- Philip Ahn as Tan Chung
- King Calder as Dan Young
- Noel Drayton as Owen Howard

== Reception ==
Leonard Maltin described it as a "Harmless B film about Anglo-American agents rescuing a kidnapped Arabian prince.", while giving it 2.5 out of 4 stars.
