= The Green Years =

Book by Archibald Joseph Cronin

- First edition (UK)
- Author: A. J. Cronin
- Language: English
- Publisher: Gollancz United Kingdom; Little, Brown United States
- Publication date: 1944
- Publication place: United Kingdom
- Media type: Print (Hardback & Paperback)
- Pages: 347 pp (UK hardback edition)

The Green Years is a 1944 novel by A. J. Cronin which traces the formative years of an Irish orphan, Robert Shannon, who is sent to live with his draconian maternal grandparents in Scotland. An introspective child, Robert forms an attachment to his roguish great-grandfather, who draws the youngster out of his shell with his raucous ways. The Green Years dominated The New York Times Fiction Best Sellers of 1945 for 17 weeks.

== Significance of title ==
The title, The Green Years, has several connotations. On one hand, this is a story about a boy's coming of age. However, the central character, Robert Shannon, also has a fascination with the natural world. Additionally, he is a Catholic growing up with his Presbyterian relatives. In the novel, he is forced for a time to wear a ridiculous green suit made for him by his Grandma, and is mercilessly teased at school because of it..

== Structure ==
The novel consists of three sections: Book One portrays the protagonist's arrival in Scotland as a child, following the death of his parents back in Ireland; Book Two focuses on the character's adolescence and ends on a pair of tragedies (the death of his best friend and his failure to win a scholarship to study medicine at the university, due to a sudden illness); Book Three begins with the protagonist as a somewhat embittered figure, entering the adult working world with little hope for the future, which is only compounded by his having fallen in love. He yearns for a career in the sciences, but is thwarted by a lack of financial resources. However, the death of his beloved great grandfather brings him an inheritance that will enable him to pursue his dreams after all.

== Adaptations ==
The Green Years was released in 1946 and it was a popular film. The film was directed by Victor Saville and the cast featured Charles Coburn, Tom Drake, Beverly Tyler, Hume Cronyn, Gladys Cooper, Dean Stockwell, Selena Royle, and Jessica Tandy.

In 1989, Korean TV Series “Angel‘s Choice (MBC)” was featured as a storyline by mixing with The Citadel.
