= Abraham Chill =

American rabbi

- Title: Rabbi

Personal life
- Born: March 30, 1912 New York City
- Died: April 20, 2004 (aged 92)
- Buried: Mount of Olives
- Spouse: Libbie
- Children: 2
- Education: Yeshiva University
- Occupation: Rabbi, author
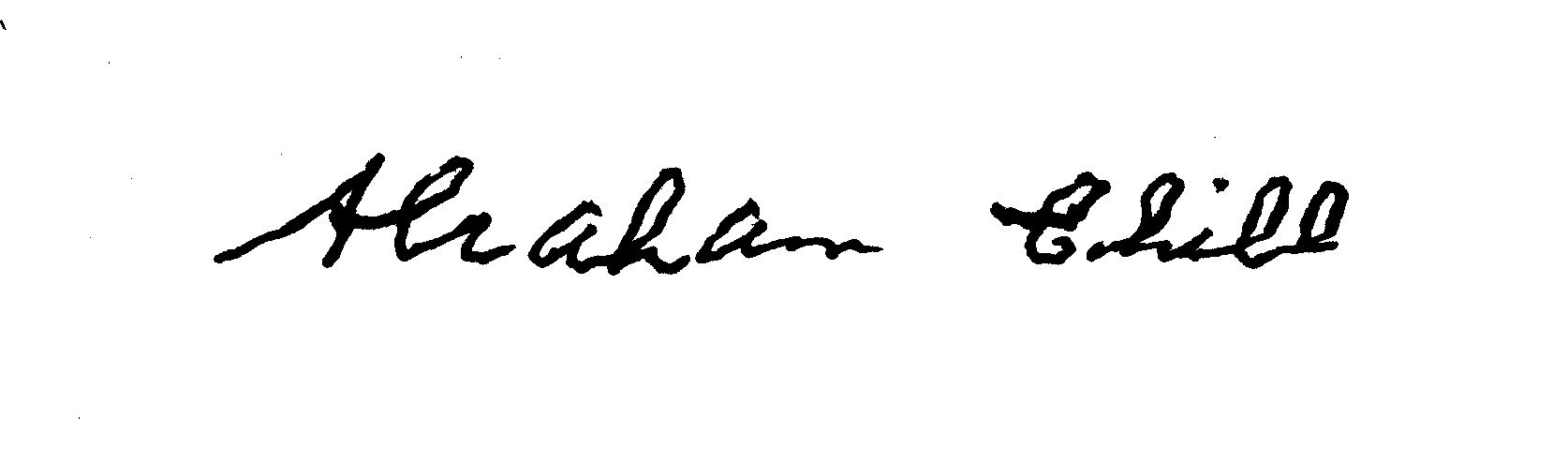
- Signature

Religious life
- Religion: Judaism
- Denomination: Orthodox

Jewish leader
- Position: Rabbi
- Synagogue: Sons of Abraham, Providence, Rhode Island
- Organisation: United States Military Academy
- Semikhah: Lomza Yeshiva, Rabbi A.I. Kook

Abraham Chill (March 30, 1912 – April 20, 2004) was the first rabbi at the United States Military Academy in West Point, New York.

Chill was born in New York City and attended Yeshiva University and the City College of New York. In 1935, he received his rabbinic ordination from Chief Rabbi Abraham Isaac Kook in Jerusalem and from the Lomza Yeshiva in Petach Tikvah, Israel. In 1941, immediately after the attack on Pearl Harbor, he enlisted in the United States Army. In 1945, after holding pre-war pulpits in Newburgh, New York, and Nashville, Tennessee, he became rabbi of Congregation Sons of Abraham in Providence, Rhode Island, a position he held until his retirement in 1969.

In 1946, he was National Chaplain of the Jewish War Veterans of the US, as well as National Chaplain of the American Legion in 1948. He was an active member of the Rabbinical Council of America, serving as president of the North-Eastern Region, and later as national secretary of the Council.

He is the author of the book The Mitzvot: The Commandments and Their Rationale, which was first published in 1974. Here he explains in detail all 613 Commandments, 365 negative and 248 positive. He also authored three other books, the Minahagim on Jewish customs, the Sidrot on the Torah reading of the week and the Abarbanel on Pirke Avot a famous commentary on "Ethics of the Fathers."

In the early 1960s, at the request of Senator John O. Pastore, he opened a session of the United States Senate with a prayer.

He was also a 32nd Degree Mason and a Shriner.

At his funeral in Jerusalem, he was eulogized by Rabbi Yehoshua Hutner, the editor-in-chief of the Encyclopedia Talmudit, who was for many years his Talmudic study partner. He is interred in Mount of Olives in Jerusalem overlooking the Temple Mount. He was survived by two children and numerous grandchildren. His wife Libbie died before he did.
