= Chillin' =

Chillin' may refer to:

- "Chillin" (Wale song), a 2009 song by rapper Wale featuring singer Lady Gaga
- "Chillin'" (Tego Calderón song), a 2006 song by Tego Calderon featuring Don Omar
- "Chillin'" (Modjo song), a 2000 song by Modjo
- "Chillin'", a 2010 song by Blaine Larsen
- Chillin' (David "Fathead" Newman album), 1999
- Chillin' (Force MDs album), 1985
- "Chillin' Chillin'", a 2021 song by Itzy from Crazy In Love
- Gregg Chillin (born 1988), English actor
