= Alvaro Guillot =

Uruguayan surrealism artist (1931–2010)

Álvaro Guillot
- Born: 1931; Uruguay
- Died: 2010 (aged 78–79); Santa Fe, New Mexico, United States
- Known for: Painting
- Notable work: New Mexico landscapes, surrealist paintings
- Style: Surrealism, Post-Surrealism
- Movement: New Surrealist School

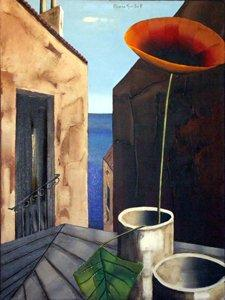
Alvaro Guillot, Poppy on a Roof, 1972

Alvaro Guillot (French: [alvaʁo ɡijo]; 1931–2010) was an artist born in Uruguay. He was a notable exponent of the "new surrealist school".

Guillot's post-surrealist late 20th and early 21st century acrylics and oils featured elements such as New Mexico landscapes, bovines, athletes, exotic women, stunted juniper uplands, prominent and peppers, with color schemes and adroit shadows. There are vestiges of his early years in South America, and elements of mid-century Paris, and contemporary Cuban art.
