= Chill (Anthony Amorim song) =

"Chill (feat. Julia Gomez)"

Single by Anthony Amorim

from the album LO:ST
- Released: July 5, 2017
- Recorded: 2017
- Genre: Pop; alternative
- Length: 3:15
- Songwriters: Anthony Amorim; Julia Gomez

Anthony Amorim singles chronology
"2004" (2016)	"Chill (feat. Julia Gomez)" (2017)

"Chill" is a song by American singer-songwriter Anthony Amorim. It was released digitally on July 5, 2017.

== Background ==
The song is about wanting to spend time with a person that you enjoy being around. To describe the song, Amorim says, "It's about wanting to hang out with someone and just, you know, chill."

== Release ==
"Chill" was released through iTunes on July 5, 2017. It peaked at #8 on the iTunes Singer/Songwriter charts.

In August 2017, Amorim released the single on CD, with an instrumental and a cappella track, through Etsy. The CD's came in a bundle with "Chill-themed" merchandise, including posters, stickers, and merchandise from the "2004 era".

== Track listing ==
Digital download
No.	Title	Length
1.	"Chill (feat. Julia Gomez)"	3:15

CD single
No.	Title	Length
1.	"Chill (feat. Julia Gomez)"	3:15
2.	"Chill" (Instrumental)	3:15
3.	"Chill" (Acapella)	3:15
Total length:		9:45
