= Holiday Film Festival =

1976–1985 Thanksgiving Day science fiction film series

Holiday Film Festival was a Thanksgiving Day science fiction film series, aired annually from 1976 to 1985 on WOR-TV (channel 9) in New York City (now WWOR-TV in Secaucus, New Jersey). For most of these broadcasts, the sponsors were local electronics chain Crazy Eddie and toy store Play World. At least for the 1979 line-up, in addition to the many ads Play World ran for the store, they sponsored a "TV crossword game" during commercial breaks, in which viewers could win a shopping spree or gift certificates.

== History ==
These WOR-TV Thanksgiving programs started on Thanksgiving Day 1976. On this occasion, Channel 9 broadcast Mighty Joe Young (at 1 p.m.), King Kong vs. Godzilla (at 3 p.m.), and Son of Kong (at 5 p.m.). In the years that followed, WOR broadcast Mighty Joe Young (at 1:00), King Kong (at 3:00), and Son of Kong (at 5:00) in 1977, Mighty Joe Young (at 12:30), King Kong (at 2:30), and Son of Kong (at 4:30) from 1978 to 1980, Mighty Joe Young (at 1:00), King Kong (at 2:45), and Son of Kong (at 4:45) in 1981, King Kong (at 1:00), Son of Kong (at 3:00), and Mighty Joe Young (at 4:15) from 1982 to 1984, and King Kong (at 1:00) and Mighty Joe Young (at 3:00) in 1985.

The ratings of the 1976 Thanksgiving marathon were good enough for WOR-TV to include the day after Thanksgiving (Friday) into the monster movie line up. Over the next few years the same movies were aired on Thanksgiving Day, but the movies broadcast the day after changed. Several times the movies Godzilla vs The Cosmic Monster, Son of Godzilla, Godzilla vs. the Sea Monster and Godzilla vs. Megalon were aired on that day.

Shortly after the 1985 program, WOR-TV lost the broadcast rights to the RKO library and Mighty Joe Young, King Kong, and Son of Kong could no longer be broadcast. This was due to parent company RKO General agreeing to sell Channel 9 to MCA Inc. in 1986 (the sale was finalized in 1987).

== Later years ==
These films later appeared on cable television's American Movie Classics while the broadcast rights to the Godzilla films were lost by WOR-TV, but began appearing on other local stations. These movies turned up in the local New York City area until 1989 and became staples on cable television's Sci-Fi Channel during the 1990s, but have seldom been broadcast on either local or cable television since 2000.

== Typical schedule ==
Thanksgiving Day November 24, 1977

- Mighty Joe Young (1 p.m.)
- King Kong (3 p.m.)
- Son of Kong (5 p.m.)

The Day After Thanksgiving November 25, 1977

- King Kong Escapes (1 p.m.)
- King Kong vs. Godzilla (3 p.m.)
- Godzilla vs The Smog Monster (5 p.m.)
