= The Fireball =

1950 film

- Theatrical release poster
- Directed by: Tay Garnett; Charles Kerr (assistant)
- Screenplay by: Horace McCoy
- Produced by: Bert E. Friedlob
- Starring: Mickey Rooney; Pat O'Brien
- Cinematography: Lester White
- Edited by: Frank Sullivan
- Music by: Victor Young
- Production companies: Bert E. Friedlob Productions; Thor Productions
- Distributed by: 20th Century Fox
- Release dates: October 8, 1950 (Los Angeles); November 9, 1950 (New York)
- Running time: 84 minutes
- Country: United States
- Language: English

The Fireball is a 1950 American drama film starring Mickey Rooney and Pat O'Brien and directed by Tay Garnett. The film also marks the eighth screen appearance of Marilyn Monroe. The screenplay was written by Horace McCoy based on a story by McCoy and Garnett.

The film was independently produced but distributed by Twentieth Century-Fox.

== Plot ==
Johnny Casar escapes from a home for wayward boys, tired of being teased about his diminutive stature and lack of athleticism. He soon finds a pair of roller skates and is befriended by Bruno Crystal, who allows him to wash dishes at his café, while the priest who runs the home, Father O'Hara, secretly keeps an eye on him.

A traveling roller-skating team takes an interest in Johnny after he shows some aptitude. He clashes with Mack Miller, a cocky champion, and falls for Mary Reeves, another top skater. Johnny is featured in grudge matches against Miller, in which they take turns besting each other.

As his fame grows, Johnny becomes even more arrogant than Miller. However, when he is diagnosed with polio, he must follow a long course of physical therapy while attempting to mend his ways.

== Cast ==
- Mickey Rooney as Johnny Casar
- Pat O'Brien as Father O'Hara
- Beverly Tyler as Mary Reeves
- James Brown as Allen
- Ralph Dumke as Bruno Crystal
- Milburn Stone as Jeff Davis
- Bert Begley as Shilling
- Marilyn Monroe as Polly
- Sam Flint as Dr. Barton
- Glen Corbett as Mack Miller
- John Hedloe as Ullman

== Reception ==
In a contemporary review for The New York Times, critic Howard Thompson wrote: "[T]hose who take Mr. Rooney's histrionics with a grain of salt had better make it a handful this time. For he is the whole show, seems completely aware of the fact and does everything but swallow the camera to prove it. ... [W]hen he is acting as normal as blueberry pie, Mr. Rooney's trouping is on a par with his excellent 'Killer McCoy' three years ago. For the most part, though, he completely eludes director Tay Garnett, mugging, swaggering and churning away like a showboat paddle-wheel."

Critic Philip K. Scheuer of the Los Angeles Times wrote: "Midget auto racing or roller skating, Mickey Rooney takes it all in his small stride. The bantam star, cocky as ever and—when he wants to be—as irresistible as ever, hops from 'The Big Wheel' to 'The Fireball' as easily as the projectionist makes a change-over in reels."
