= Beverly Tyler =

American actress and singer (1927–2005)

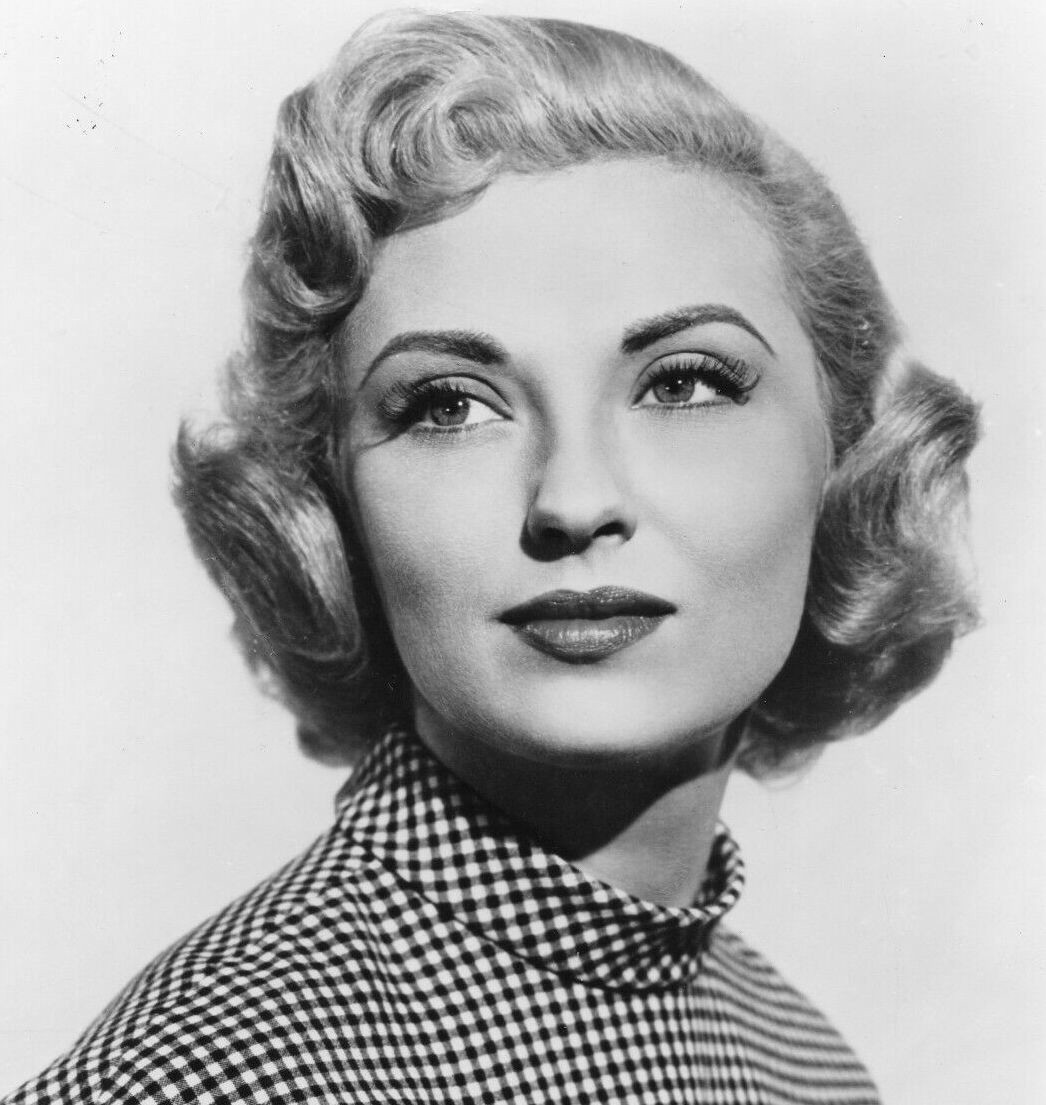
- Tyler in 1950
- Born: Beverly Jean Saul; July 5, 1927; Scranton, Pennsylvania, U.S.
- Died: November 23, 2005 (aged 78); Reno, Nevada, U.S.
- Resting place: Our Mother of Sorrows Cemetery, Reno, Nevada
- Occupation: Actress
- Years active: 1940–1990
- Spouse(s): Jim Jordan Jr. (1962-1998), his death
- Children: 4

Beverly Tyler (born Beverly Jean Saul, July 5, 1927 – November 23, 2005), was an American film actress and singer who was a minor MGM leading lady who appeared in mostly B movies in the 1940s and 1950s.

== Early years ==
Tyler was born in Scranton, Pennsylvania, on July 5, 1927. Her parents, Mr. and Mrs. Warren Saul, a secretary and factory employee, secured piano and music lessons for their daughter at a young age. She was raised in adjacent Dunmore, Pennsylvania, attended Central High School; her parents and she were devout Methodists who were active in the Dunmore Methodist Church, where Beverly sang in the choir. When she was 14 years old, Tyler passed screen and voice tests and was informed, "you're a movie actress."

== Film and television ==
Tyler debuted in films billed as Beverly Jean Saul in The Youngest Profession (1943). (Another source gives Best Foot Forward (1943) as "her first film production".) She worked in over 30 motion pictures between 1943 and 1957, including The Green Years (1946), My Brother Talks to Horses (1947), The Fireball (1950), Voodoo Island (1957), Toughest Gun in Tombstone (1958), and Hong Kong Confidential (1958). In 1953, Tyler played Lorelei Kilbourne on the television program Big Town. She also was seen on TV in The Andy Griffith Show, Bonanza, and Hazel. She was considered for the roles of Betty Schaefer in Sunset Boulevard (1950), Eve Harrington in All About Eve (1950), Georgie Elgin in The Country Girl (1954), and Marylee Hadley in Written on the Wind (1956), but never got any of these parts.

== Stage ==
Tyler appeared on Broadway during her teenaged years as the female lead in the 1945 production The Firebrand of Florence, portraying Angela.

== Later years ==
Tyler's last appearance on the small screen was in 1961, and for the next few decades, she focused on marriage and motherhood, and was a mainstay on the local theatre and supper-club circuit in Reno until her retirement in 1990. She did return to her native Scranton/Dunmore area in 1950 to promote her picture The Fireball and was given the key to the city by then-Mayor James T. Hanlon, and she also went back to spend a few weeks in 1990 after her retirement to visit her old neighborhood with a childhood friend with whom she had kept in touch.

== Personal life ==
During her time in Hollywood, Tyler was well known as a "girl about town" being seen at some of Tinsel Town's most popular nightclubs with such leading men as Mickey Rooney, Rory Calhoun, and Peter Lawford.

In May 1962, she married Jim Jordan, Jr., the son of the famed 1930s radio couple Fibber McGee and Molly, and had a son and three daughters. They remained married until his death in December 1998.

== Death ==
Tyler died under her married name of Beverly Jordan on November 23, 2005, in Reno, Nevada, from a pulmonary embolism, and was laid to rest at Our Mother of Sorrows Cemetery in Reno, Nevada.
