= Chiller Theatre (1984 TV series) =

Chiller Theatre aired on various local television stations in the Green Bay market from 1984 until early 2009. It last aired Saturday nights on WGBA - Channel 26 in Green Bay, Wisconsin, following Saturday Night Live, and then Saturdays on WACY 32 at 11pm. The show is hosted by Ned the Dead and his sidekick Doc Moreau. The program features classic horror movies and other cult films. On March 28, 2009, The Ned the Dead Show premièred with a new format and new movies. However, the show still takes place at the Chiller Theater. New cast members have joined Ned the Dead and Doc Moreau, including Vicki Vixen, and Small Town Steve. The Ned the Dead show also features independent films and videos in a segment called Sconniewood.
