= Chiller Theatre (1961 TV series) =

TV series

Chiller Theatre was a Saturday night television series broadcast by Channel 11 WPIX New York that showed classic horror movies.

== History ==
=== 1960s ===
Chiller Theater began airing on WPIX in 1961. Beginning in 1963, its host was John Zacherle ("The Cool Ghoul"). Zacherle quit the show in 1965. Each episode of the show began with the "Classic Montage Opening" that used a montage of brief segments of film from various 1950s fantasy and science fiction movies. This montage began with a scene from the movie Plan 9 from Outer Space with Vampira coming out of a forest, followed by a clip from the movie The Cyclops, showing actress Gloria Talbott just inside a cave looking at the Cyclops. Various other clips continued throughout the montage, concluding with one of from Attack of the 50 Foot Woman, with a "goof" showing a giant alien from outer space picking up a car and then throwing a different type of car into a ditch. The entire montage was permeated by an eerie library music track ("Horror Upon Horror" by veteran British composer Wilfred Josephs).

The montage opening served until the late 1960s when another introduction was substituted, featuring the word "Chiller" rendered in white paint on a black board, then lifted up, the gooey white paint slowly running down the board like blood while creepy chamber music played in the background. The bumper to this version simply showed the painted "Chiller" as a title card. The montage opening was discontinued in favor of this version perhaps because by the late 1960s movie studios began to charge television stations royalties for film clips.

=== 1970s ===
By 1971, the painted title card sequence was replaced with the clay animation (claymation) of a six-fingered hand, produced by WPIX in-house with possible assistance from a technician for Rankin Bass (the same production company that produced the 1964 claymation television movie Rudolph The Red Nose Reindeer.) The six-fingered hand sequence features a minimalistic/surreal scene of a swamp with a river of blood in the foreground extending back to the horizon, a dead tree in the background, and a six-fingered humanoid hand that rises from the swamp. The soundtrack consists of a reverberant whistling and ghostly sound elements that decrease in pitch as the sequence progresses. As the hand rises, the word "Chiller" simultaneously emerges from the ground. The hand passes over each growing letter, then snatches them one by one before returning to the swamp, and a voice is heard groaning the word "Chillllller ..." in an eerie, robotic voice.

The six-fingered hand opening was used throughout the remainder of the show's run through the early 1980s. The program was usually broadcast at 8:00 p.m. on Saturday nights, but for a time in 1974, it was broadcast at 11:30 p.m. The series was cancelled at the end of 1978 and was resumed in early 1980 at 2:00 a.m. Sunday late-night.

=== 1980s and 2008, 2009, 2010, and 2011 revivals ===
Chiller Theatre was cancelled again in 1982.

After a 26-year absence on WPIX, Chiller Theatre was revived on Saturday, October 25, 2008, at 8 p.m. for one night, featuring the movie Tarantula. The show began with the classic black and white original montage opening, followed during commercial breaks by shots of the famous six-fingered claymation hand.

On August 13, 2009, WPIX announced another broadcast of the show as a Halloween special. It was revealed in October that Chiller Theatre would air the Hammer movie The Evil of Frankenstein with Elvira, Mistress of the Night as hostess, replacing Zacherley, the Cool Ghoul. The fan response was positive, and WPIX allowed Elvira more broadcast time to deliver her one-liner jokes. Despite some criticism, the show did well against the World Series that night, and WPIX has begun marketing Chiller Theatre memorabilia at its website.

In 2010, WPIX Channel 11 announced that Chiller Theatre would be broadcast again during Halloween weekend with four movies: White Zombie, Bride of the Monster, Dolls and Child's Play.

In 2011, WPIX announced that they would broadcast Chiller Theatre again on October 29, 2011. The two movies featured for 2011 were the 1960 version of The Little Shop of Horrors followed by Night of the Living Dead. 2011's presentation was hosted by several people from WPIX's morning newscast. While the 2011 presentation did include brief showings of the six figure claymation hand, there were no showings of the original opening. WPIX has not broadcast another Chiller Theatre Halloween special since.

Since 1990, New Jersey has been the host of the Chiller Theater Toy, Model, and Film Expo, which has become one of the longest-running horror conventions in the eastern United States.
