= List of Cinema Insomnia episodes =

This page is a list of episodes for the American TV series Cinema Insomnia.

Cinema Insomnia is preparing for its 6th season on Roku streaming channel OSI-74, Outer Space International. A total of 90 episodes are currently available for streaming there from Seasons 1–5, 2015–2021.

== List of Cinema Insomnia episodes ==
=== Season 1 ===
Episode/Film(s)	Year Released	Film Director(s)
Santa Fe	1997	Andrew Shea
Casablanca Express	1989	Sergio Martino
Captured	1998	Peter Liapis
The Seventh Seal	1957	Ingmar Bergman
Made for Each Other	1939	John Cromwell
The Terror	1963	Roger Corman; Francis Ford Coppola; Monte Hellman; Jack Hill; Jack Nicholson
Royal Wedding	1951	Stanley Donen
The Wraith	1986	Mike Marvin
The Fear Inside	1992	Leon Ichaso
The Dark Side of the Sun	1997	Božidar Nikolić
My Favorite Brunette	1947	Elliott Nugent
The Southerner	1945	Jean Renoir
Sundown	1941	Henry Hathaway
Captain Kidd	1945	Rowland V. Lee
Linda	1993	Nathaniel Gutman
Deadly Heroes	1993	Menahem Golan
Scarlet Street	1945	Fritz Lang
They Made Me a Criminal	1939	Busby Berkeley
=== Season 2 ===
The She Creature	1956	Edward Cahn
Invasion of the Neptune Men	1961	Koji Ota
Prince of Space	1959	Eijirō Wakabayashi
Attack of the Giant Leeches	1959	Bernard L. Kowalski
Night of the Living Dead	1968	George A. Romero
Halloween Special with Bob Wilkins	2002	Bob Wilkins
Carnival of Souls	1962	Herk Harvey
Gigantis the Fire Monster	1959	Motoyoshi Oda
The Scarlet Pimpernel	1934	Harold Young
The Brain That Wouldn't Die	1959	Joseph Green
Captain Kidd	1945	Rowland V. Lee
First Spaceship on Venus	1962	Kurt Maetzig
My Favorite Brunette	1947	Elliott Nugent
Voyage to the Prehistoric Planet	1965	Curtis Harrington
The Seventh Seal	1957	Ingmar Bergman
The Terror	1963	Roger Corman; Francis Ford Coppola; Monte Hellman; Jack Hill; Jack Nicholson
They Made Me a Criminal	1939	Busby Berkeley
=== Season 3 ===
The Horror of Party Beach	1964	Del Tenney
Star Crash	1979	Luigi Cozzi
Bigfoot: Mysterious Monster	1976	Robert Guenette
Prince of Space	1959	Eijirō Wakabayashi
The Day the Earth Caught Fire	1961	Val Guest
Dick Tracy Meets Gruesome	1947	John Rawlins
Santo vs. The Vampire Women	1962	Alfonso Corona Blake
Super Wheels	1975	Rudolf Zehetgruber
The Wasp Woman	1959	Roger Corman; Jack Hill
Demons	1985	Lamberto Bava
The Day Time Ended	1980	John 'Bud' Carlos
Godzilla vs. the Smog Monster	1971	Yoshimitsu Banno
Carnival of Souls	1962	Herk Harvey
Creature	1985	William Malone
First Spaceship on Venus	1962	Kurt Maetzig
The She Creature	1956	Edward Cahn
Scrooge	1951	Brian Desmond Hurst
In Search of Ancient Astronauts	1973	Harald Reinl
Gamera: Super Monster	1980	Noriaki Yuasa
Super Argo	1971	Paolo Bianchini
A Bucket of Blood	1959	Roger Corman
Devil Doll	1964	Lindsay Shonteff
Voyage to the Prehistoric Planet	1965	Curtis Harrington
Monster from a Prehistoric Planet	1967	Haruyasu Noguchi
Invasion of the Neptune Men	1961	Koji Ota
Gigantis: The Fire Monster	1959	Motoyoshi Oda
The Brain That Wouldn't Die	1959	Joseph Green
Night of the Living Dead	1968	George A. Romero
=== Season 4 ===
The Last Man on Earth	1964	Ubaldo Ragona; Sidney Salkow
Frankenstein vs. the Creature from Blood Cove	2005	William Winckler
The Day of the Triffids	1962	Steve Sekely
House on Haunted Hill	1959	William Castle
Santa Claus Conquers the Martians	1964	Nicholas Webster
=== Season 5 ===
The Visitor	1979	Giulio Paradisi
The Crawling Eye	1958	Quentin Lawrence
Eegah!	1962	Nicholas Merriweather
Infra-Man	1975	Shan Hua
Attack of the Giant Leeches	1959	Bernard L. Kowalski
Killers from Space	1954	W. Lee Wilder
The Giant Gila Monster	1959	Ray Kellogg
Plan 9 from Outer Space; Hardware Wars	1959; 1977	Edward D. Wood, Jr. Ernie Fosselius
Nightmare in Blood	1978	John Stanley
=== Season 6 ===
Mark of the Damned	2006	Eric Miller
The Little Shop of Horrors	1960	Roger Corman
The Undertaker and His Pals	1966	T.L.P. Swicegood
=== Season 7 ===
Venus Flytrap	1970	Gerardo de León; Eddie Romero
=== OSI Season 1 ===
The Screaming Skull	1958	Alex Nicol
Weng Weng, The Impossible Kid	1982	Eddie Nicart
I Bury the Living	1958	Albert Band
Horror Hotel	1960	John Llewellyn Moxey
Amazing Transparent Man	1960	Edgar G. Ulmer
Nightmare Castle	1965	Mario Caiano
The Bat	1959	Crane Wilbur
Horrors of Spider Island	1960	Fritz Böttger
Midget Zombie Takeover	2013	Glenn Berggoetz
War of the Planets	1977	Alfonso Brescia
Maxwell Stein	2009	Dale Jackson
Bucket of Blood	1959	Roger Corman
Undertaker & His Pals	1966	T. L. P. Swicegood
The Atomic Brain	1963	Joseph V. Mascelli
The Wraith	1986	Mike Marvin
=== OSI Season 2 ===
Battle of the Worlds	1961	Antonio Margheriti
Little Shop of Horrors Holiday Special	1960	Roger Corman
The Original Pilot: They Made Me a Criminal	1939	Busby Berkeley
Starcrash	1979	Luigi Cozzi
Prisoners of the Lost Universe	1983	Terry Marcel
Gigantis: The Fire Monster	1955	Motoyoshi Oda
Gamera: Super Monster	1980	Noriaki Yuasa
Prince of Space	1958	Eijirō Wakabayashi
Invasion of the Neptune Men	1961	Koji Ota
The Horror of Party Beach	1964	Del Tenney
Night of the Living Dead	1968	George A. Romero
Superwheels: Supersized Edition	1975	Rudolf Zehetgruber
Carnival of Souls	1962	Herk Harvey
Monster From a Prehistoric Planet	1967	Haruyasu Noguchi
The Day the Earth Caught Fire	1961	Val Guest
Dark Side of the Sun	1988	Božidar Nikolić
Creature	1985	William Malone
Vampire Hunter's Club	2001	Donald F. Glut
You Better Watch Out: Cinema Insomnia's Scary Merry Christmas Special	1980	Lewis Jackson
Captain Kidd	1945	Rowland V. Lee
Scarlet Pimpernel	1934	Harold Young
=== OSI Season 3 ===
The Red House	1947	Delmer Daves
Bloodsuckers of the Atomic Swamp	1959	Bernard L. Kowalski
Channel 74's Cinema Showplace presents War of the Robots	1978	Alfonso Brescia
American Werewolf in the Philippines	1970	Eddie Romero
Deep Red	1975	Dario Argento
In Search of Ancient Astronauts	1973	Alan Landsburg
Scarlet Street	1945	Alfonso Brescia
Cinema Insomnia Goes to Blobfest	2018	Aaron M. Lane
Channel 74's Cinema Showplace presents Werewolf of Washington	1973	Milton Moses Ginsberg
Creepers	1985	Dario Argento
The Day Time Ended	1980	John Cardos
Demons	1985	Lamberto Bava
Dick Tracy Meets Gruesome	1947	John Rawlins
Eating Raoul	1982	Paul Bartel
Devil Doll	1964	Lindsay Shonteff
Last Man on Earth	1964	Sidney Salkow
=== OSI Season 4 ===
Xenia: Priestess of Night	1976	Dana M. Reemes
Santa Fe	1997	Andrew Shea
The Depraved in Select-o-Vision	1966	Ray Dennis Steckler
Day of the Triffids	1962	Steve Sekely
Wasp Woman	1959	Roger Corman
Cinema Insomnia Goes to Intergalactic Expo	2019	Aaron M. Lane
Teenagers From Outer Space: Live!	1959	Tom Graeff
Deadly Heroes	1993	Menahem Golan
Cinema Insomnia Returns to Blobfest	2019	Aaron M. Lane
First Spaceship on Venus	1962	Kurt Maetzig
Bride of the Monster: Live!	1955	Ed Wood
Eegah!	1962	Arch Hall Sr.
Voyage to the Prehistoric Planet	1965	Pavel Klushantsev
A Hard Day's Nightmare	2011	Richard Something
Bob Wilkins Special: The Lost Tapes	2002	Aaron M. Lane
The Terror	1963	Roger Corman
House on Haunted Hill	1959	William Castle
The Totally Fake Ghostbusters Haunted House Special	2013	Mister Lobo
Terror in the Haunted House	1958	Harold Daniels
SuperArgo in SuperArgoscope	1968	Paolo Bianchini
Santo Vs. the Vampire Women	1962	Alfonso Corona Blake
Santa Claus Conquers the Martians	1964	Nicholas Webster
=== OSI Season 5 ===
Monster of Frankenstein	1981	Yugo Serikawa
She Creature... of Destruction	1967	Larry Buchanan
The Fear Inside	1992	Leon Ichaso
The Brain That Wouldn't Die	1962	Joseph Green
Lancelot Link Special	1970	Stan Burns
Mark of the Damned: Part 1	2006	Eric Miller
Mark of the Damned: Part 2	2006	Eric Miller
Ed Wood's Venus Flytrap	1970	Norman Earl Thomson
The Seventh Seal	1957	Ingmar Bergman
Cyxork 7	2006	John Huff
Jesus Christ: Vampire Hunter	2001	Lee Demarbre
Frankenstein vs. the Creature from Blood Cove	2005	William Winckler
Superturtle Destroys the Universe	1968	Noriaki Yuasa
Creatures, Critters, & Hobgoblins Special	1988	Rick Sloane
Plan 9 & Hardware Wars	1957	Ed Wood
Royal Wedding	1951	Stanley Donen
The Eye Creatures	1967	Larry Buchanan
=== OSI Season 6 ===
Return of the Vampire Strikes Back	1943	Lew Landers
Gigangtis vs. the Smog Monster	1971	Yoshimitsu Banno
Night of the Living Dead: Reanimated	2009	Mike Schneider
My Favorite Brunette	1947	Elliott Nugent
Nightmare in Blood	1978	John Stanley
Cinema Insomnia Goes To Blobfest 2014	2014	Aaron M. Lane

== See also ==
- List of films in the public domain in the United States
- List of Mystery Science Theater 3000 episodes
