= Elvira's Movie Macabre =

American hosted horror movie television program

- Title card
- Also known as: Movie Macabre with Elvira, Mistress of the Dark
- Genre: Comedy; Horror; Science fiction
- Presented by: Cassandra Peterson
- Starring: Cassandra Peterson; John Paragon
- Country of origin: United States
- Original language: English
- No. of seasons: 5
- No. of episodes: 140

Original release
- Network: KHJ-TV (1981–86)
- Release: September 26, 1981 – November 2, 1986

Elvira's Movie Macabre (titled on-screen as Movie Macabre with Elvira, Mistress of the Dark in its original run), or simply Movie Macabre, is an American hosted horror movie television program that originally aired locally from 1981 to 1986. The show features B movies, particularly those in the horror and science fiction genres, and is hosted by Elvira, a character with a black dress and heaven bump hairstyle, played by Cassandra Peterson. Elvira occasionally interrupts the films with comments and jokes, and in some episodes receives prank phone calls from a character called "the Breather" (John Paragon).

The popularity of the show led to a feature film, Elvira: Mistress of the Dark, which was released in 1988. The character returned in the 2001 film Elvira's Haunted Hills. The show was revived in 2010 as Elvira's Movie Macabre, in which Elvira hosted public domain films. This revival aired on This TV until 2011. Elvira returned as a horror hostess in 2014 with 13 Nights of Elvira, a 13-episode series produced by Hulu. In 2021, she recreated her show for a one-night movie marathon on the streaming service Shudder to celebrate the show's 40th anniversary. The special was called Elvira's 40th Anniversary, Very Scary, Very Special Special.

== History ==
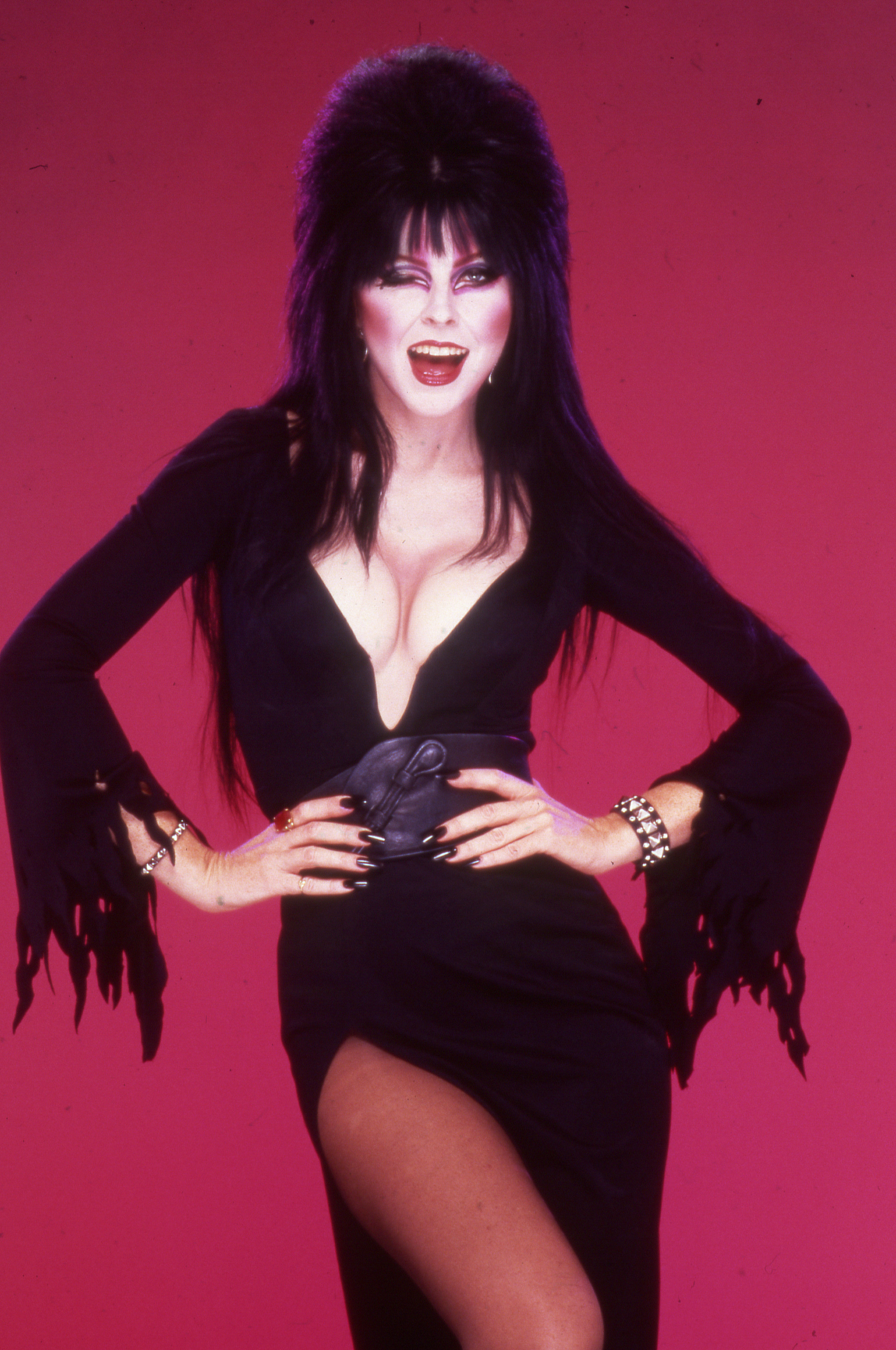
Peterson dressed as Elvira in 1984

In 1981, six years after the death of Larry Vincent, who starred as host Sinister Seymour of a Los Angeles weekend horror show called Fright Night, plans were made to replace the show with a new program and a new host.

The producers initially turned to 1950s' horror hostess Maila Nurmi to resurrect The Vampira Show. Nurmi worked on the project for a short time, but quit when the producers would not hire Lola Falana, Nurmi's pick for the role of Vampira. The station sent out a casting call, and Peterson auditioned and won the role. She and her close friend, makeup artist Robert Redding, decided to style Peterson in a sensual goth/vampire look after producers rejected her original idea to dress like Sharon Tate's character in The Fearless Vampire Killers. Elvira's look drew inspiration from a Kabuki makeup book in Redding's possession and the bouffant hairstyles of The Ronettes.

Shortly before the first taping, producers received a cease and desist letter from Nurmi. Besides the similarities in the format and costumes, Elvira's closing line for each show, wishing her audience "Unpleasant dreams," was notably similar to Vampira's closer: "Bad dreams, darlings..." uttered as she walked off down a misty corridor. The court ruled in favor of Peterson, holding that "'likeness' means actual representation of another person's appearance, and not simply close resemblance." Peterson claimed that Elvira was nothing like Vampira aside from the basic design of the black dress and black hair. Nurmi claimed that Vampira's image was based on Morticia Addams, a character in Charles Addams's cartoons that appeared in The New Yorker magazine.

Peterson's Elvira character rapidly gained notice with her tight-fitting, low-cut, cleavage-displaying black gown. Adopting the flippant tone of a California "Valley girl", she brought a satirical, sarcastic edge to her commentary. She reveled in dropping risqué double entendres and making frequent jokes about her cleavage. In an AOL Entertainment News interview, Peterson said, "I figured out that Elvira is me when I was a teenager. She's a spastic girl. I just say what I feel and people seem to enjoy it." Her camp humor, sex appeal, and good-natured self-mockery made her popular with late-night movie viewers and her popularity soared.

Elvira was a frequent guest on The Tonight Show Starring Johnny Carson and other talk shows. She also produced a long-running series of Halloween-themed television commercials for Coors Light Beer and Mug Root Beer (her trademark cleavage was concealed for the Coors campaign). She appeared in guest roles on television dramas such as CHiPs, The Fall Guy and Fantasy Island and appeared on numerous awards shows as a presenter. Although she is known primarily as Elvira, Peterson has made out-of-costume appearances as herself for television interviews and specials.

Two million pairs of $0.99 3D glasses were reportedly sold for the 22 May 1982, broadcast of The Mad Magician.

In 1982, with the success of Movie Macabre, Knott's Theme Parks hired Elvira to replace Seymour as the host of its annual Halloween Haunt during October. Elvira appeared nightly at the park, live on stage with a Halloween-themed musical comedy revue similar to her Mamma's Boys act from the 1970s.

The Elvira character rapidly evolved from obscure cult figure to a lucrative brand name. She was associated with many products through the 1980s and 1990s, including Halloween costumes, comic books, action figures, trading cards, pinball machines, Halloween decor, model kits, calendars, perfume and dolls. She has appeared on the cover of Femme Fatales magazine five times. Her popularity reached its zenith with the release of the feature film Elvira, Mistress of the Dark, on whose script, written directly for the screen, Peterson collaborated with John Paragon and Sam Egan.

== Episode list ==
=== Season 1 ===
Episode	Film shown	Ep #	Date
01	Grave of the Vampire	1	September 26, 1981
02	Silent Night, Bloody Night	2	October 3, 1981
03	The House That Screamed	3	October 10, 1981
04	The Fall of the House of Usher	4	October 17, 1981
05	The Dunwich Horror	5	October 25, 1981
06	Blacula	6	October 31, 1981
07	The Comedy of Terrors	7	November 7, 1981
08	The Thing with Two Heads	8	November 14, 1981
09	The Werewolf of Washington	9	November 21, 1981
10	Cry of the Banshee	10	November 28, 1981
11	Count Yorga, Vampire	11	December 5, 1981
12	Murders in the Rue Morgue	12	December 12, 1981
13	Baron Blood	13	December 27, 1981
14	Dr. Jekyll and Sister Hyde	14	January 3, 1982
15	The Crimson Cult	15	January 10, 1982
16	The Murder Clinic	16	January 16, 1982
17	Horror Express	17	January 23, 1982
18	The Incredible 2-Headed Transplant	18	January 30, 1982
19	Horror Hospital	19	February 6, 1982
20	Rattlers	20	February 13, 1982
21	Disciple of Death	21	February 20, 1982
22	Frankenstein	22	February 28, 1982
23	The Devil's Rain	23	March 6, 1982
24	Psychic Killer	24	March 13, 1982
25	Necromancy	25	March 20, 1982
26	The Spectre of Edgar Allan Poe	26	March 27, 1982
27	Peeping Tom	27	April 3, 1982
28	Legacy of Blood	28	April 10, 1982
29	Deathdream	29	April 18, 1982
30	The Deathmaster	30	April 25, 1982
31	Beware! The Blob	31	May 1, 1982
32	Good Against Evil	32	May 8, 1982
33	The Brotherhood of Satan	33	May 15, 1982
34	The Mad Magician	34	May 22, 1982
35	The Turn of the Screw	35	May 22, 1982
36	Count Dracula's Great Love	36	May 29, 1982
37	Jennifer	37	June 12, 1982
38	Masque of the Red Death	38	June 19, 1982
39	The Tomb of Ligeia	39	June 26, 1982
40	The Incredible Melting Man	40	July 3, 1982
41	The Fearless Vampire Killers	41	July 10, 1982
42	Terror House	42	July 17, 1982
43	The Baby	43	July 24, 1982
44	The House of Seven Corpses	44	July 31, 1982
45	Psychomania	45	August 7, 1982
46	Whoever Slew Auntie Roo?	46	August 14, 1982

=== Season 2 ===
Episode	Film shown	Ep #	Date
01	War-Gods of the Deep	47	September 4, 1982
02	The Oblong Box	48	September 11, 1982
03	The Raven	49	September 25, 1982
04	The Conqueror Worm	50	October 2, 1982
05	And Now the Screaming Starts!	51	October 9, 1982
06	Blood from the Mummy's Tomb	52	October 16, 1982
07	Madhouse	53	October 23, 1982
08	The House That Dripped Blood	54	October 30, 1982
09	Tales of Terror	55	October 30, 1982
10	The Strange Case of Dr. Jekyll and Mr. Hyde	56	November 7, 1982
11	The Day It Came to Earth	57	November 13, 1982
12	The Blood on Satan's Claw	58	November 20, 1982
13	Crucible of Horror	59	November 27, 1982
14	Dr. Black, Mr. Hyde	60	December 4, 1982
15	The Devil Within Her	61	December 12, 1982
16	The Bat People	62	December 19, 1982
17	The Return of Count Yorga	63	January 1, 1983
18	Inn of the Frightened People	64	January 8, 1983
19	Craze	65	January 29, 1983
20	The Monster Club	66	February 6, 1983
21	The Creature's Revenge	67	February 12, 1983
22	Beast of the Dead	68	February 19, 1983
23	The Island of Living Horror	69	February 26, 1983
24	The Devil's Wedding Night	70	March 5, 1983
25	The Torture Chamber of Dr. Sadism	71	March 12, 1983
26	Curse of the Vampires	72	March 20, 1983
27	The Vampire People	73	March 26, 1983
28	Scream and Scream Again	74	April 2, 1983
29	The Human Vapor	75	April 9, 1983
30	Lemora: A Child's Tale of the Supernatural	76	April 16, 1983
31	The Haunted Palace	77	June 18, 1983
32	The Doomsday Machine	78	August 27, 1983

=== Season 3 ===
Episode	Film shown	Ep #	Date
01	They Came from Beyond Space	79	September 17, 1983
02	Blue Sunshine	80	October 1, 1983
03	Screamers	81	October 29, 1983
04	Willard	82	November 5, 1983
05	The Time Travelers	83	November 12, 1983
06	Maneater of Hydra	84	November 20, 1983
07	They Came From Within	85	December 11, 1983
08	Gamera: Super Monster	86	December 24, 1983
09	New Year's Evil	87	December 31, 1983
10	Homebodies	88	January 28, 1984
11	Dracula	89	February 4, 1984
12	Attack of the Killer Tomatoes	90	March 3, 1984
13	Dr. Heckyl and Mr. Hype	91	March 17, 1984
14	Alien Contamination	92	March 24, 1984
15	Village of the Damned	93	April 14, 1984
16	Monstroid	94	May 12, 1984
17	The Beast in the Cellar	95	May 19, 1984
18	The House of the Dead	96	May 26, 1984
19	Circus of Horrors	97	June 10, 1984
20	Pigs	98	June 17, 1984
21	Schizoid	99	June 23, 1984
22	The Godsend	100	June 30, 1984
23	Blood Bath	101	July 8, 1984
24	Kiss Daddy Goodbye	102	July 14, 1984
25	The Love War	103	July 28, 1984
26	The Human Duplicators	104	August 5, 1984
27	Mark of the Devil	105	August 11, 1984
28	So Sad About Gloria	106	August 19, 1984
29	Night of the Zombies	107	August 26, 1984

=== Season 4 ===
Episode	Film shown	Ep #	Date
01	Inn of the Damned	108	September 1, 1984
02	Tombs of the Blind Dead	109	September 8, 1984
03	Frankenstein's Castle of Freaks	110	September 15, 1984
04	The Capture of Bigfoot	111	September 22, 1984
05	Village of the Giants	112	November 3, 1984
06	The Legend of Hell House	113	November 10, 1984
07	The Other	114	November 25, 1984
08	The Navy vs. the Night Monsters	115	December 1, 1984
09	The Last Bride of Salem	116	January 12, 1985
10	Yeti: The Giant of the 20th Century	117	February 9, 1985
11	The Revenge of Frankenstein	118	March 10, 1985
12	Curse of Bigfoot	119	March 24, 1985
13	The Great Alligator	120	May 4, 1985

=== Season 5 ===
Episode	Film shown	Ep #	Date
01	House of Dark Shadows	121	July 14, 1985
02	The Horror of Death	122	June 29, 1986
03	Kill and Go Hide	123	July 6, 1986
04	The Legend of Lizzie Borden	124	July 13, 1986
05	The Mad Butcher	125	July 20, 1986
06	The Meateater	126	July 27, 1986
07	The Mighty Gorga	127	August 3, 1986
08	Scream, Baby, Scream	128	August 10, 1986
09	Straight Jacket	129	August 17, 1986
10	They Saved Hitler's Brain	130	August 24, 1986
11	Tomb of the Living Dead	131	August 31, 1986
12	The Two Faces of Dr. Jekyll	132	September 7, 1986
13	The Boy Who Cried Werewolf	133	September 14, 1986
14	Let's Scare Jessica to Death	134	September 21, 1986
15	Horror of the Zombies	135	September 28, 1986
16	House of the Long Shadows	136	October 5, 1986
17	Children Shouldn't Play with Dead Things	137	October 12, 1986
18	Empire of the Ants	138	October 19, 1986
19	Nightwing	139	October 26, 1986
20	Nightmare City	140	November 2, 1986

== Revivals ==
=== Midnight Madness (1990s) ===
In the 1990s, Rhino Home Video released Midnight Madness, a collection of films hosted by Elvira, on VHS.

- Eegah
- Frankenstein's Daughter
- Killers from Space
- The Giant Gila Monster
- The Mask
- She Demons
- Night of the Ghouls
- I Eat Your Skin
- The Brain That Wouldn't Die
- The Brain from Planet Arous
- A Bucket of Blood
- The Crawling Hand
- The Wasp Woman
- The Hideous Sun Demon
- Missile to the Moon

=== Elvira's Movie Macabre (2010–11) ===
The logo used for Elvira's Movie Macabre (2010–11)

In September 2010, Elvira's Movie Macabre returned to television syndication in the United States, airing on This TV. This revival saw Elvira hosting public domain films. 26 episodes were produced; six were left unaired, but were released on both DVD and iTunes.

s#e#	Film shown	ep	Week of
s1e01	Night of the Living Dead	1	September 20, 2010
s1e02	The Terror	2	September 27, 2010
s1e03	The Giant Gila Monster	3	October 4, 2010
s1e04	The Brain That Wouldn't Die	4	October 11, 2010
s1e05	The Satanic Rites of Dracula	5	October 18, 2010
s1e06	Scared to Death	6	October 25, 2010
s1e07	The Werewolf of Washington	7	November 1, 2010
s1e08	Eegah	8	November 8, 2010
s1e09	Teenagers from Outer Space	9	November 15, 2010
s1e10	Santa Claus Conquers the Martians	10	December 20, 2010
s1e11	I Eat Your Skin	11	January 17, 2011
s1e12	Don't Look in the Basement	12	January 24, 2011
s1e13	Untamed Women	13	January 31, 2011
s1e14	Jesse James Meets Frankenstein's Daughter	14	February 7, 2011
s1e15	Lady Frankenstein	15	February 14, 2011
s1e16	The Manster	16	February 21, 2011
s1e17	Tormented	17	April 25, 2011
s1e18	Manos: The Hands of Fate	18	May 2, 2011
s1e19	Hercules and the Captive Women	19	May 9, 2011
s1e20	A Bucket of Blood	20	May 16, 2011
s1e21	Attack of the Giant Leeches	21	unaired
s1e22	Beast from Haunted Cave	22	unaired
s1e23	Monster from a Prehistoric Planet	23	unaired
s1e24	The Killer Shrews	24	unaired
s1e25	The Wasp Woman	25	unaired
s1e26	The Wild Women of Wongo	26	unaired

=== 13 Nights of Elvira (2014) ===
13 Nights of Elvira was produced for Hulu by Brainstorm Media. A new episode streamed each day through Halloween. The series teamed with film distributor Full Moon Features; it provided the majority of the films chosen for the series.

Episode	Film shown	Date
01	Cannibal Women in the Avocado Jungle of Death	October 19, 2014
02	Puppet Master	October 20, 2014
03	Demonic Toys	October 21, 2014
04	Hobgoblins	October 22, 2014
05	The Gingerdead Man	October 23, 2014
06	Dollman	October 24, 2014
07	Trancers	October 25, 2014
08	Oblivion	October 26, 2014
09	Shrunken Heads	October 27, 2014
10	Hideous!	October 28, 2014
11	Evil Bong	October 29, 2014
12	Seedpeople	October 30, 2014
13	Night of the Living Dead	October 31, 2014

=== Elvira's 40th Anniversary, Very Scary, Very Special Special (2021) ===
To celebrate the original show's 40th anniversary, Cassandra Peterson revived her role for a special one-night movie marathon, which premiered live on Shudder, the horror streaming service. The special came out on September 25, 2021, the same week as her memoir, Yours Cruelly, Elvira.

	Film shown	Year made
01	Elvira: Mistress of the Dark	1988
02	House on Haunted Hill	1959
03	The City of the Dead	1960
04	Messiah of Evil	1973

== DVD releases ==
=== Time Life ===
In 2004, Time Life released a series of special Elvira DVDs titled Elvira's Horror Classics, which was done in a similar fashion to Movie Macabre. There were seven films total in the series. There was a 3-DVD box set for six of the seven films titled Elvira's Box of Horrors. This box set consists of three double feature DVDs. The films featured were all in the public domain. They included:

- The Little Shop of Horrors and The Brain That Wouldn't Die
- Dementia 13 and Carnival of Souls
- House on Haunted Hill and Night of the Living Dead

The films were also released on four stand-alone DVDs. Three of the four DVDs were double features under the Elvira's Horror Classics title. Night Of The Living Dead was a single feature DVD without the Elvira's Horror Classics title branding on the DVD case art. It was titled as Night of the Living Dead "Hosted by Elvira". The disc itself does have the Elvira's Horror Classics branding on it.

- The Little Shop of Horrors and The Brain That Wouldn't Die
- Dementia 13 and Carnival of Souls
- House on Haunted Hill and The Terror
- Night of the Living Dead

=== Shout! Factory ===
Shout! Factory has released a small number of Movie Macabre episodes to DVD, in both single and double feature format. The DVDs allow the material to be shown either complete with Elvira's interruptions or uninterrupted. Unlike the original broadcasts, the films are complete and uncensored.

==== Single DVDs ====
- Frankenstein's Castle of Freaks
- Count Dracula's Great Love
- Legacy of Blood
- The Devil's Wedding Night
- The Doomsday Machine
- The Werewolf of Washington

==== Double feature DVDs ====
- Blue Sunshine and Monstroid
- Gamera: Super Monster and They Came from Beyond Space
- Maneater of Hydra and The House That Screamed
- Count Dracula's Great Love and Frankenstein's Castle of Freaks
- Legacy of Blood and The Devil's Wedding Night
- The Doomsday Machine and The Werewolf of Washington

=== E1 Entertainment ===
Following the revival of Elvira's Movie Macabre in 2011, E1 Entertainment began releasing episodes of the new series on DVD. Unlike the Shout! Factory editions, these films were released in their edited format as aired in syndication.

==== Single DVDs ====
- The Satanic Rites of Dracula
- I Eat Your Skin
- Night of the Living Dead
- The Brain That Wouldn't Die
- Santa Claus Conquers the Martians
- Beast from Haunted Cave (previously unaired)
- The Terror
- Hercules and the Captive Women
- The Wasp Woman (previously unaired)
- The Wild Women of Wongo (previously unaired)
- Untamed Women

==== Double feature DVDs ====
- Night of the Living Dead and I Eat Your Skin
- Satanic Rites of Dracula and The Werewolf of Washington
- The Terror and Eegah
- The Brain That Wouldn't Die and The Manster
- Scared to Death and Tormented
- Lady Frankenstein and Jesse James Meets Frankenstein's Daughter
- Santa Claus Conquers the Martians and Beast from Haunted Cave (previously unaired)

==== Quadruple feature sets ====
- Wild Women featuring Untamed Women, The Wild Women of Wongo (previously unaired), Hercules and the Captive Women and The Wasp Woman (previously unaired)
- Giant Monsters featuring The Giant Gila Monster, Attack of the Giant Leeches (previously unaired), Teenagers from Outer Space, and Monster from a Prehistoric Planet (previously unaired)
- Bloody Madness featuring A Bucket of Blood, The Killer Shrews (previously unaired), Manos: The Hands of Fate and Don't Look in the Basement

== See also ==
- List of films in the public domain in the United States
- List of Cinema Insomnia episodes
- List of Mystery Science Theater 3000 episodes
