= Nightmare in Blood =

- Directed by: John Stanley
- Written by: Kenn Davis; John Stanley
- Produced by: Kenn Davis; John Stanley
- Starring: Jerry Walter; Dan Caldwell; Barrie Youngfellow; Kerwin Mathews
- Cinematography: Charles Rudnick
- Edited by: Alfred Katzman
- Distributed by: PFE
- Release date: 1978
- Running time: 90 min.
- Country: United States
- Language: English

Nightmare in Blood is a 1978 American horror film directed by professional late night television horror movie host, and writer, John Stanley.

== Plot ==
Attendees at a horror-film convention in San Francisco keep disappearing. It turns out that the guest of honor is a real vampire, and his henchmen are kidnapping the convention guests. A horror writer, a Sherlock Holmes fan and an Israeli Nazi-hunter set out to stop him.

== Production ==
Primary filming occurred at the Fox Oakland Theatre in Oakland, California. The Fox was renamed the "Palace" in the film.

== Release ==
The film ran in the drive-in theater circuit for nearly a decade and had a wide VHS release in the 1980s.

In 2004, Image Entertainment released the film on DVD.

It had its broadcast premiere with a national syndicated showing on Mr. Lobo's Cinema Insomnia.
