= Apprehensive Films =

American film company

- Industry: Films
- Founded: 1997–2016
- Headquarters: Citrus Heights, California, United States
- Website: http://www.afcinema.net/ (expired)

Apprehensive Films was an independent American film production and distribution company in operation from 1997–2016. Its main focus was low-budget exploitation-inspired films shot in Super 8 mm film and 16 mm film. In 2006, Apprehensive Films became a DVD distributor specializing in cult, horror and exploitation film. Apprehensive Films took over the television distribution of the horror hosted television series Cinema Insomnia which led to their re-licensing the show to AMGTV.

== Distributed films ==
Film	DVD Release Year
Bad Girls Go to Hell	2008
Calamity of Snakes	2019
Centipede Horror	2007
Colony	2007
Hardware Wars	2009
Mark of the Damned	2009
Naked Massacre	2007
Night of Bloody Horror	2008
Porklips Now	2009
Ratman	2009
The Sadist	2007
Scream Bloody Murder	2007
Why Lie? I Need a Drink	2010

== Cinema Insomnia Slime Line DVDs ==
Slime Line DVD cover for the 1975 documentary Bigfoot: Mysterious Monster.

In 2010, Apprehensive Films introduced a new line of Cinema Insomnia DVDs called Slime Line. The Slime Line DVDs feature brand new audio mixes, new retro film-clips, coming attractions for classic B-movie and new indies. The Slime Line DVDs also contain Slime Points which can be collected and mailed into Apprehensive Films for select prizes. Apprehensive Films has also licensed episodes Dick Tracy Meets Gruesome, Gappa: Monsters From a Prehistoric Planet, In Search of Ancient Astronauts, Super Wheels, and Voyage to the Prehistoric Planet to Amazon Video on Demand.

=== Slime Line DVDs ===
- Bigfoot: Mysterious Monster
- Carnival of Souls
- Cinema Insomnia Halloween Special
- Creature
- Dick Tracy Meets Gruesome
- Eegah
- First Spaceship on Venus
- Gamera: Super Monster
- Gappa: Monsters From a Prehistoric Planet
- In Search of Ancient Astronauts
- Night of the Living Dead
- Santa Claus Conquers the Martians
- Super Wheels
- Voyage to the Prehistoric Planet
- The Wasp Woman
