= Ray Kellogg =

Ray Kellogg may refer to:

- Ray Kellogg (director) (1905–1976), American special effects artist, film director and producer
- Ray Kellogg (actor) (1919–1981), American film and television actor
