= They Made Me a Criminal =

1939 film

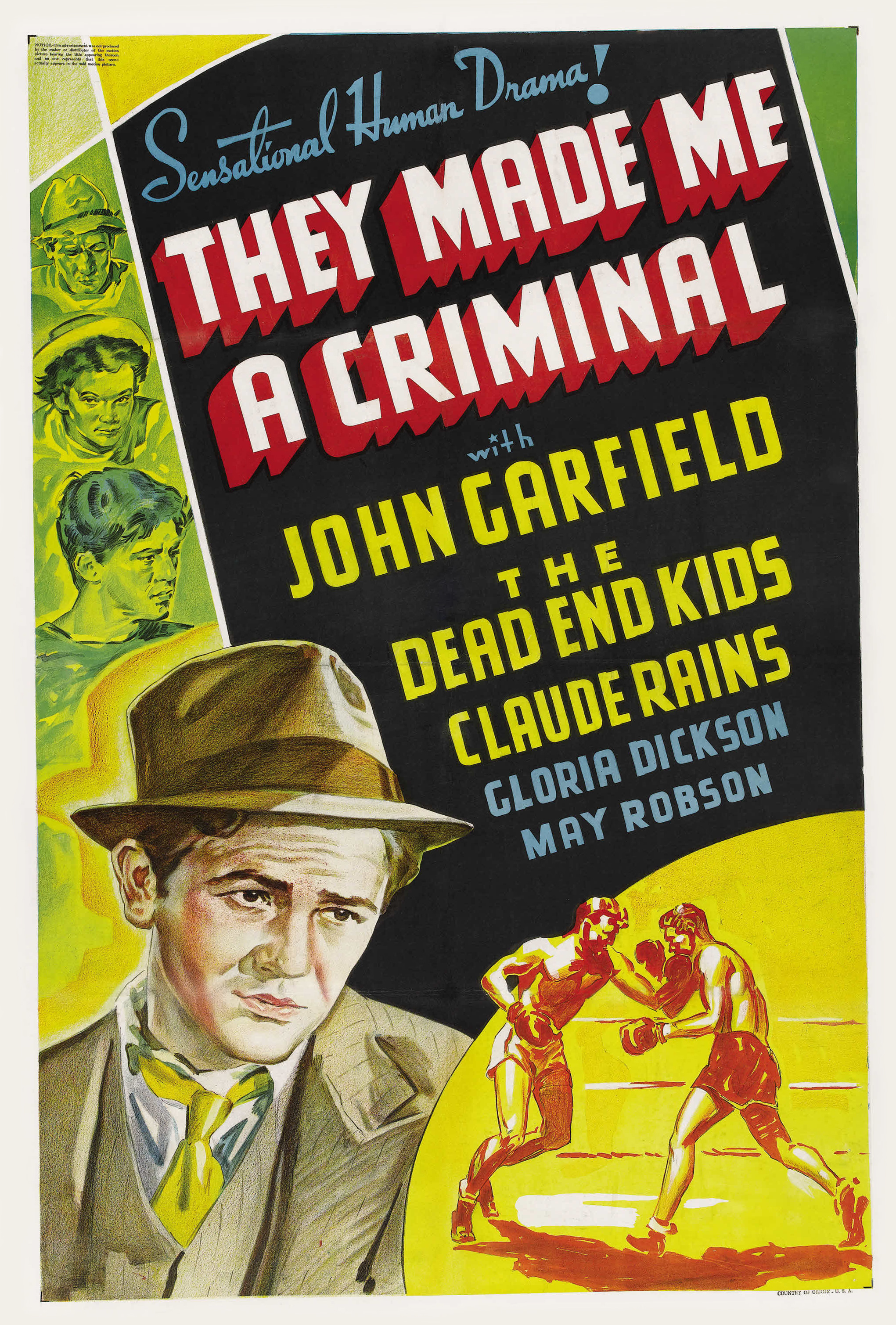
- Theatrical poster
- Directed by: Busby Berkeley
- Screenplay by: Sig Herzig
- Based on: Sucker; 1933 play by Bertram Millhauser; Beulah Marie Dix
- Produced by: Benjamin Glazer; Hal B. Wallis
- Starring: John Garfield; Claude Rains; Ann Sheridan; May Robson; Gloria Dickson; Billy Halop
- Cinematography: James Wong Howe
- Edited by: Jack Killifer
- Music by: Max Steiner
- Distributed by: Warner Bros. Pictures
- Release date: January 28, 1939
- Running time: 92 minutes
- Country: United States
- Language: English

They Made Me a Criminal is a 1939 American crime-drama film directed by Busby Berkeley and starring John Garfield, Claude Rains, and The Dead End Kids. It is a remake of the film The Life of Jimmy Dolan (1933). The film later was featured in an episode of Cinema Insomnia. Portions of the film were shot in the Coachella Valley, California.

== Plot ==
Johnnie Bradfield is a southpaw world champion boxer falsely accused of murder, after his manager strikes and accidentally kills a reporter who plans to report on Bradfield's confession that he is not really a teetotaler devoted to his mother, but a drinker and high-liver. At his manager's advice, Bradfield disappears and is presumed dead. The manager steals Bradfield's money and girlfriend and flees; they were the only witnesses who could have exonerated him, but they die in an automobile accident, pursued by the police. Detective Monty Phelan, a coroner living under a cloud because he once mistakenly sent someone to the electric chair, believes that Johnnie is still alive and hasn't given up on searching for him. Johnnie, meanwhile, is hiding out on the feisty Grandma Rafferty's farm in Arizona. There, he meets with some juvenile delinquents, who are under the guardianship of Tommy's sister Peggy.

Johnnie, using the fake name of Jack Dorney, takes Tommy under his wing and encourages him to go in business for himself by buying a gas pump for the farm. He helps the kids raise money by returning to the boxing ring for a match against an up-and-coming boxer. Johnnie sees Phelan arriving at the fight and decides not to fight, disappointing the kids and Peggy. However his determination to help the kids overcomes him and he decides to fight. He tries to hide who he really is by not using his trademark stance in the ring, but not being a good right-handed fighter, he is on the verge of losing. Phelan calls out to him from ringside, announcing that he knows who Johnnie is, and encourages him to win. Because of this, Johnnie abandons the orthodox stance, and fights southpaw, but having already absorbed so much damage, he still is defeated in the fifth round. He nonetheless has earned thousands of dollars to help Tommy buy the gas pump. He surrenders to Phelan, assuming he will be arrested, but at the last moment, the detective allows him to remain in Arizona instead of returning to New York.

== Cast ==
=== Main cast ===
- John Garfield as Johnnie Bradfield/aka Jack Dorney
- Claude Rains as Det. Monty Phelan
- Ann Sheridan as Goldie West
- Barbara Pepper as Budgie
- May Robson as Grandma Rafferty
- Gloria Dickson as Peggy
- Ward Bond as Lenihan
- William B. Davidson as the Chief of Detectives
- Robert Gleckler as Doc Ward
- Robert Strange as Malvin

=== The Dead End Kids ===
- Billy Halop as Tommy
- Bobby Jordan as Angel
- Leo Gorcey as Spit
- Gabriel Dell as T.B.
- Huntz Hall as Dippy
- Bernard Punsley as Milt

== References to other films ==
When Dippy is operating the shower controls for Jack, who is showering, he serenades him with the song By a Waterfall, which was a hit song from the director's earlier film Footlight Parade.

== Malaprop ==
This film also contains the first malapropism of the Dead End Kids/East Side Kids/Bowery Boys series when Jordan says "Regenerate, ya dope" when Hall used the word degenerate. Malapropisms became a staple of these films, with Gorcey using them on a regular basis throughout the series.

== Home media ==
As this film is in the public domain, there have been several DVD releases from a variety of companies over the years. The Alpha Video DVD was released on July 30, 2002.

== See also ==
- List of boxing films
