= Blood Legacy =

- Directed by: Carl Monson
- Screenplay by: Eric Norden (screenplay); Carl Monson (story)
- Produced by: Carl Monson (producer); Ben Rombouts (executive producer)
- Starring: Rodolfo Acosta; Merry Anders; Norman Bartold; John Carradine; Faith Domergue
- Cinematography: Jack Beckett
- Edited by: John Post
- Music by: Jaime Mendoza-Nava
- Production company: Studio West Film Distributors
- Distributed by: Ellman Film Enterprises
- Release date: March 17, 1971 (United States)
- Running time: 89 minutes (theatrical release); 79 minutes (home video)
- Country: United States
- Language: English
- Budget: $56,000 (estimated)

Blood Legacy (also called Legacy of Blood and Will to Die) is a 1971 horror film directed by Carl Monson, starring Rodolfo Acosta, Merry Anders, Norman Bartold, John Carradine, and Faith Domergue.

There is a 1978 film with the same name and a similar plot, but it should not be confused with this one.

== Plot ==
Christopher Dean (John Carradine) has died. His four adult children—Greg, Veronica, Johnnie, and Leslie—along with their spouses, as well as Christopher's longtime three servants, have been summoned to the mansion to listen to Christopher's previously recorded last will.

The servants are entitled to a monthly salary of $500 as long as they remain in service. The children, on the other hand, are to inherit equal portions of the $136 million balance of the estate. However, in the event of any child's demise, the remaining share will be distributed among the surviving siblings. If all the children perish, the servants become the heirs to whatever is left.

A peculiar condition in the will requires the children to stay in the deceased's house for one week to qualify for their inheritance. Christopher, in his recorded message, explicitly expresses his lack of affection or respect for his four offspring. He advises them to decline his offer if they possess any virtue.

Later that night, Greg and Laura’s dog Chin is found dead, and the sheriff is killed with an ax. Veronica and Carl talk, revealing that his wife Leslie previously engaged in incest with her brother Johnny. They then go to the kitchen. As they take a ham out of the refrigerator, the tinfoil is lifted, revealing the sheriff’s severed head. Everyone gathers in the living room. The phone lines have been cut, and the cars have been sabotaged, so they have to stay in the house. Johnny flashes back to his father beating Frank and Igor with a cane, and mockingly forcing Igor to act as an organ grinder monkey. Igor grew to enjoy the beatings, and he tries forcing Elga to whip him. She flees in horror.

Greg and Laura are electrocuted in their bed by a faulty lamp. Carl gives his distraught wife a sedative. Frank sits in his room, full of trophies from his time in World War II, including Nazi flags and a lamp made of human skin. Veronica enters, asking if he had the missing parts of the vehicles. He denies this, and she expresses interest in continuing their relationship from when they were younger.

Leslie has a dream about Johnny, and describes it to her husband. She demands to see Johnny, which he forbids due to their history. After Carl leaves, Johnny sneaks in to see Leslie. He tries convincing her to run away with him, then flees downstairs in a panic. He is approached by the killer wielding an ax. Leslie wanders downstairs, finding Johnny dead, having been drowned in the fish tank. She flees outside, and is shot in the head by the killer. Carl finds her body, picking up the revolver used, and is suspected as the killer by Frank and Veronica. He is tied up in the basement, where the killer releases a swarm of bees, which sting him to death. Hearing his screams, Frank and Veronica find his body, then see the killer, chasing him into the wine cellar.

Christopher was the killer, having killed everyone off to prevent them from getting the inheritance. He then reveals that none of them are his children, and he killed their mother because of that. Christopher, Veronica and Frank are suddenly crushed to death by a falling shelf of wine barrels. Igor and Elga killed them as revenge for their years of mistreatment, as well as to claim the inheritance. As they celebrate in the kitchen, Igor dies from the poisoned cookies Elga gave him. She then breaks the fourth wall, asking the audience if they thought the butler did it.

== Cast ==
- Rodolfo Acosta: Sheriff Dan Garcia
- Merry Anders: Laura Dean
- Norman Bartold: Tom Drake
- Ivy Bethune: Elga
- John Carradine: Christopher Dean
- Richard Davalos: Johnny Dean
- Faith Domergue: Veronica Dean
- Buck Kartalian: Igor Garin
- Brooke Mills: Leslie Dean
- Jeff Morrow: Gregory Dean
- John Russell: Frank Mantee
- John Smith: Dr. Carl Isenburg
- Mr. Chin: Chin

== Presentations ==
Horror hostess Elvira, Mistress of the Dark (Cassandra Peterson) presented Blood Legacy as part of her Movie Macabre series. The film was also riffed by the cast of Cinematic Titanic.
