= The Giant Gila Monster =

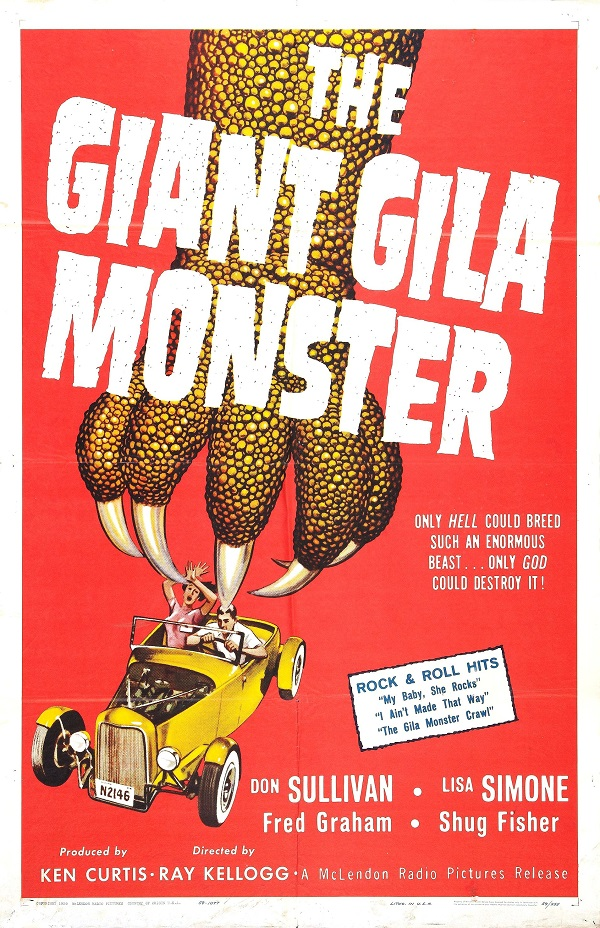
- Theatrical release poster
- Directed by: Ray Kellogg
- Screenplay by: Jay Simms
- Story by: Ray Kellogg
- Produced by: Ken Curtis; B. R. McLendon; Gordon McLendon
- Starring: Don Sullivan; Fred Graham; Lisa Simone; Shug Fisher; Bob Thompson
- Narrated by: Gordon McLendon
- Cinematography: Wilfred M. Cline
- Edited by: Aaron Stell
- Music by: Jack Marshall; Don Sullivan (songs)
- Distributed by: McLendon-Radio Pictures Distributing Company
- Release date: July 15, 1959
- Running time: 75 minutes
- Country: United States
- Language: English
- Budget: $138,000

The Giant Gila Monster is a 1959 American monster film directed by Ray Kellogg and produced by Ken Curtis. A famous B-movie of the era, the film stars Don Sullivan, a veteran of several low budget monster and zombie films, and Lisa Simone, the French contestant for the 1957 Miss Universe, as well as comedic actor Shug Fisher and KLIF disc jockey Ken Knox. The effects included a live Mexican beaded lizard, instead of a Gila monster, that was filmed on a scaled-down model landscape. The film was released by McLendon Radio Pictures on July 15, 1959. It played on a double feature with The Killer Shrews (1959).

== Plot ==
The Giant Gila Monster

A gigantic, mutated Gila monster begins stalking a rural Texas community. Young couple, Pat (Grady Vaughn) and Liz (Yolanda Salas), are attacked by the creature while parked in their vehicle overlooking a ravine, sending the car crashing into the ravine below. Local sheriff (Fred Graham) launches a search for the missing couple, assisted by their friends, including Chase Winstead (Sullivan), a young mechanic and hot rod racer. Chase locates the crashed car in the ravine, the inside smeared with blood and the couple nowhere to be found.

Meanwhile the creature continues its attacks, eating livestock and crashing an oil tanker, before eventually destroying a bridge, causing a major train accident. Only after this do the authorities realize that they are dealing with a giant venomous lizard. By this time, emboldened by its attacks and hungry for prey, the creature attacks the town. It heads for the local dance hall, where the town's teenagers are gathered for a sock hop. In an effort to stop the monster, Chase packs his prized hot rod with nitroglycerin and rigs it to speed straight into the Gila monster, killing it in a fiery explosion and heroically saving the town.

== Cast ==
- Don Sullivan as Chase Winstead
- Lisa Simone as Lisa
- Fred Graham as Sheriff Jeff
- Shug Fisher as Old Man Harris
- Bob Thompson as Mr. Wheeler
- Janice Stone as Missy Winstead
- Ken Knox as Horatio Alger "Steamroller" Smith
- Gay McLendon as Mrs. Winstead
- Don Flournoy as Gordy
- Cecil Hunt as Mr. Compton
- Stormy Meadows as Agatha Humphries
- Howard Ware as Ed Humphries
- Pat Reeves as Rick
- Jan McLendon as Jennie
- Jerry Cortwright as Bob
- Beverly Thurman as Gay
- Clarke Browne as Chuck
- Grady Vaughn as Pat Wheeler
- Desmond Doogh as hitchhiker
- Ann Sonka as Whila
- Yolanda Salas as Liz Humphries

== Production and release ==
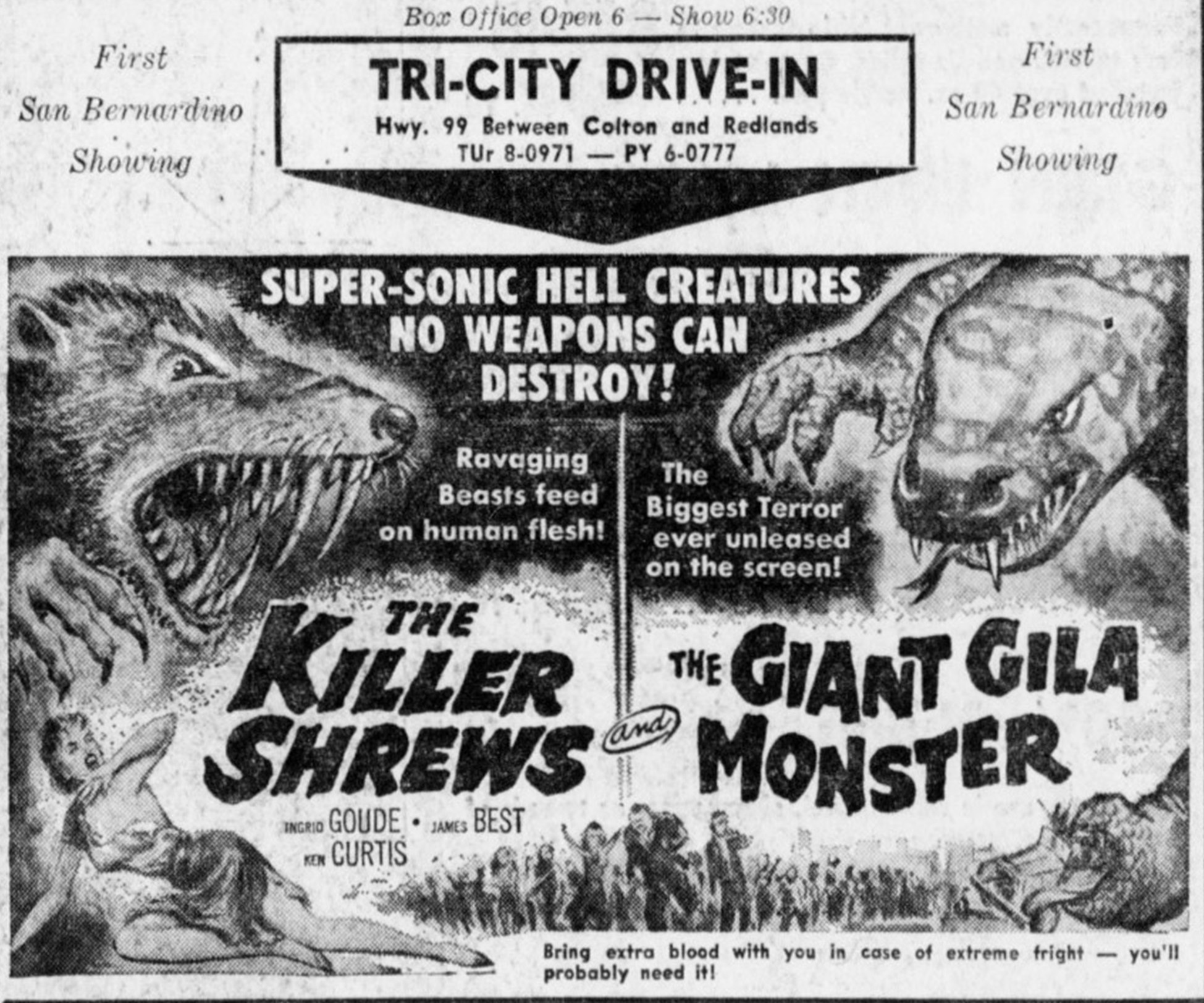
Drive-in advertisement from 1959 for The Giant Gila Monster alongside its co-feature The Killer Shrews

Filmed near Dallas, Texas, the film was budgeted at $175,000 and was produced by Dallas drive-in theater chain owner Gordon McLendon who wanted co-features for his main attractions. McLendon shot the film back-to-back with The Killer Shrews. Both films were feted as the first feature films shot in and produced in Dallas, and the first movies to premiere as double features. Unlike most double features released in the South, these films received national and even foreign distribution.

In exchange for doing the special effects, Kellogg was allowed to direct the film. Curtis allowed Sullivan to pick the songs with the teenage market in mind. Knox, who played Horatio Alger "Steamroller" Smith, was an actual disc jockey working at radio stations in Texas owned by McLendon. The "Gila monster" in the movie is actually a Mexican beaded lizard (which are similar in appearance but tend to be larger than Gilas).

The film's world premiere took place in Dallas on June 25, 1959.

== Reception ==
On his website Fantastic Movie Musings and Ramblings Dave Sindelar gave the film a positive review, writing, "Whatever flaws there are with the story, I find myself drawn to the regional feel of the movie, and especially to the likable characters that inhabit this environment...It's rare for a movie to have this many likable characters, and I think the reason I watch the movie again and again is because I just like to spend time with them". TV Guide gave the film 2 out of 5 stars, calling it "a rear-projected monster just doesn't put audiences in a deep state of fear, especially when it's a lizard. It does, however, induce occasional uncontrolled laughter". Alan Jones from Radio Times awarded the film 1 out of 5 stars, calling it "unintentionally amusing rather than scary".

== References in popular culture ==
The film was featured in a season 5 episode of Cinema Insomnia and season 4 of Mystery Science Theater 3000.

== Remake ==
A made-for-TV remake, Gila!, directed by Jim Wynorski, was released in 2012.

== See also ==
- List of films in the public domain in the United States
