= Bill McCutcheon =

American actor

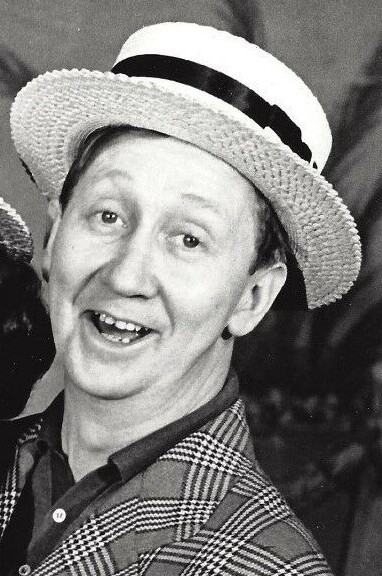
- McCutcheon in the Off-Broadway's revue Wet Paint
- Born: May 23, 1924; Russell, Kentucky, U.S.
- Died: January 9, 2002 (aged 77); Ridgewood, New Jersey, U.S.
- Occupation: Actor
- Years active: 1941–2002
- Spouse: Anne McCutcheon (m. 1952)
- Children: 3

James William McCutcheon (May 23, 1924 – January 9, 2002) was an American character actor known for his roles in film, television, and theatre, several of which won him Emmy and Tony awards.

== Early life and career ==
McCutcheon was born in Russell, Kentucky, the son of Robert Kenna McCutcheon, who was a railroad conductor and Florence Louise (née Elam). McCutcheon's first major role was Leo the Leprechaun on The Howdy Doody Show. He followed this appearance with a recurring role (from 1984 to 1992) as Uncle Wally on the children's television series by PBS, Sesame Street, for which he won an Emmy.

He was also active in film and on the stage. His first film appearance was in 1964's Santa Claus Conquers the Martians; later on, he was seen in movies including Family Business and Steel Magnolias. McCutcheon was a familiar face to young audience in the 1960s, when he appeared on several Tootsie Roll television commercials. His theatre credits include a role as Moonface Martin in Anything Goes, which won him a Tony Award for Best Featured Actor in a Musical.

Other stage appearances include You Can't Take It with You and The Man Who Came to Dinner.

== Death ==
A resident of Mahwah, New Jersey, McCutcheon died on January 9, 2002, of natural causes, aged 77. He had three children, Carol, Jay, and Kenna.

== Filmography ==
Year	Title	Role	Notes
1964	Santa Claus Conquers the Martians	Dropo	
1969	Viva Max!	Desmond Miller	
1972	Deadhead Miles	Used Car Salesman	
1972	The Stoolie	Gas Station Proprietor	
1975	W.W. and the Dixie Dancekings	Good Ole Boy #1	
1979	Hot Stuff	Paully Albadecker	
1985	What Comes Around	Store Owner	
1988	Vibes	Mr. Van Der Meer	
1989	Steel Magnolias	Owen Jenkins	
1989	Family Business	Doheny	
1990	Tune in Tomorrow	Puddler	
1990	Mr. Destiny	Leo Hansen	
