= Calamity of Snakes =

1982 Taiwanese-Hong Kong film by Chi Chang

- Japanese-language theatrical release poster

Chinese name
- Traditional Chinese: 人蛇大戰
- Simplified Chinese: 人蛇大战
Transcriptions
Standard Mandarin
- Hanyu Pinyin: Ren she da zhan
- Directed by: Chi Chang
- Production companies: Chi He Film Company; Kee Woo Film (H.K.) Co.
- Release date: 1982
- Running time: 96 minutes
- Countries: Taiwan; Hong Kong
- Languages: Mandarin; Cantonese; English

Calamity of Snakes (人蛇大战; Ren she da zhan) is a 1982 horror film directed by Chi Chang (also known as William Cheung Kei). An international co-production of Taiwan and Hong Kong, the film concerns the residents of a newly built apartment building being attacked by thousands of vengeful snakes, which seek retribution for the killing and displacement of multitudes of snakes at the site of the building's construction.

Rather than utilizing special effects to depict violence against snakes, Calamity of Snakes features genuine footage of snakes being mutilated and killed, including being burned alive.

== Censorship ==
The film was banned in British Columbia, Canada, by the British Columbia Film Classification Branch in 1982.

== Reception ==
In 2023, Jeffrey Kauffman of Blu-ray.com called the film "a completely gonzo outing that has a few scattered moments of humor which are probably completely undercut (no pun intended) by the absolutely horrifying footage of snakes being killed in various ways."

== Home media ==
In April 2023, Unearthed Films released Calamity of Snakes on Blu-ray and DVD; the release includes a "cruelty free version" of the film which omits shots that feature snakes being harmed. This version is ten minutes shorter than the theatrical cut.
