= Koji Ota =

Japanese baseball player and commentator

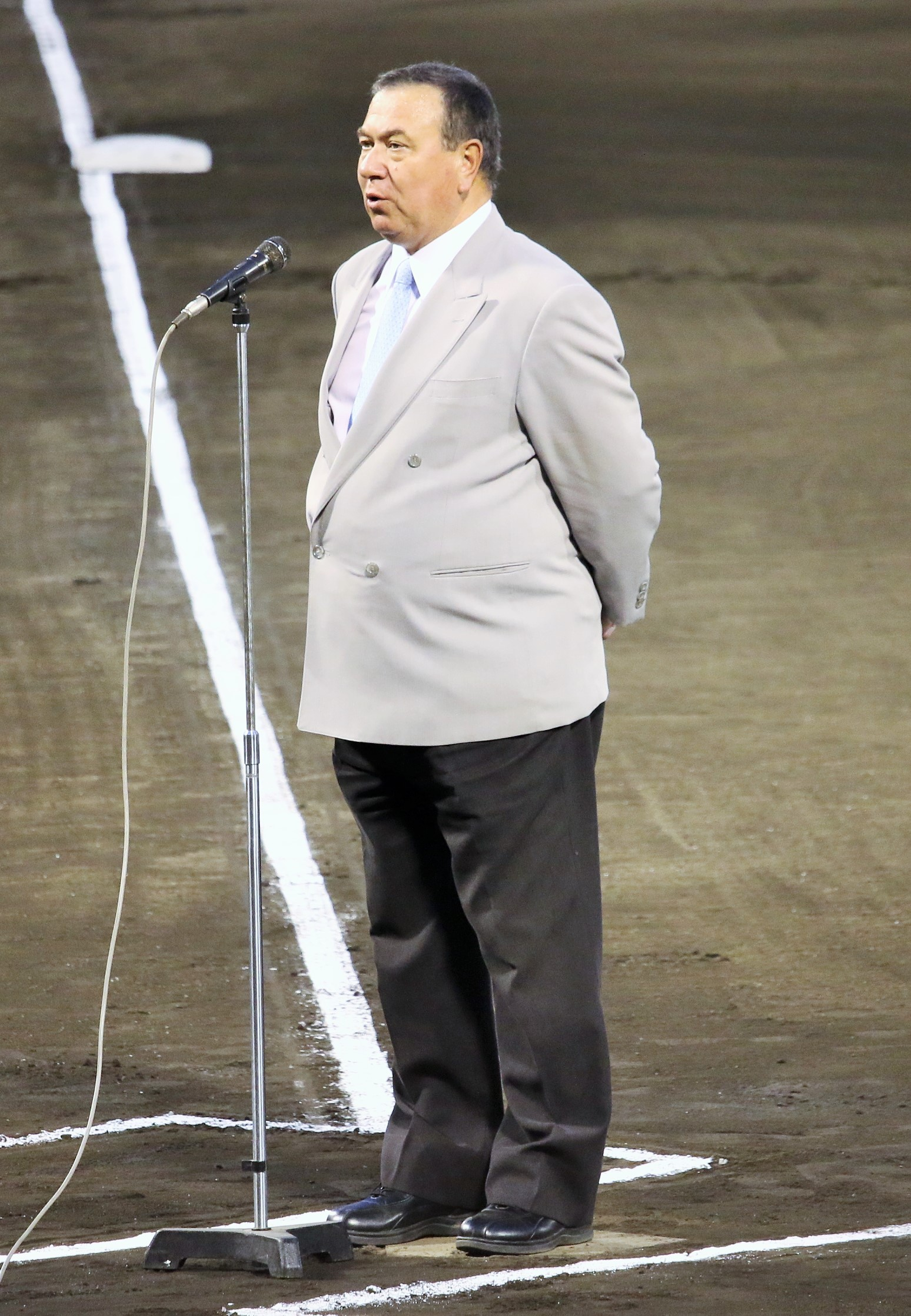
- Japanese former professional baseball pitcher
- Pitcher
- Born: January 23, 1952 (age 74); Misawa, Aomori, Japan
- Batted: Right Threw: Right

NPB debut
- 1970, for the Kintetsu Buffaloes

Last NPB appearance
- 1984, for the Hanshin Tigers

Career statistics
- Win–loss record: 58-85
- Earned run average: 4.05
- Innings pitched: 1331.1
- Strikeouts: 604
- Stats at Baseball Reference

Teams
- Kintetsu Buffaloes (1970–1982); Yomiuri Giants (1983); Hanshin Tigers (1984)

Career highlights and awards
- 7x All-Star (1969, 1971, 1972, 1973, 1974, 1975, 1977)

Koji Ota (太田 幸司, Ōta Kōji; born January 23, 1952) is a Japanese former professional baseball pitcher in Japan's Nippon Professional Baseball, and belongs to Mainichi Broadcasting System, Inc. as a commentator in baseball live on radio and TV. Ota is a son of an American father and a Japanese mother, the adopted son of a Japanese stepfather and a Russian stepmother, who emigrated to Japan because of the Russian Revolution in 1917.

== High school career ==
Ota is known for pitching in the final of the 1969 National High School Baseball Championship. He pitched 18 shutout innings on one of the most-watched TV programs in Japanese history. After the game was called due to darkness, he returned the next game, but lost 4-2. Before he graduated from high school, a book had been written about him and several TV documentaries had been aired. A popular figure among women due to his blue eyes and overall appearance, Ota became an instant celebrity nationwide.
