= Nicholas Webster =

American film director

Nicholas Webster (July 24, 1912 – August 12, 2006) was an American film and television director.

== Television works ==
He is chiefly remembered for his CBS program The Violent World of Sam Huff (1960; featuring the first use of a wireless microphone on television); the ABC Close Up documentary Walk in My Shoes (1961), nominated for an Emmy as the best television program of the year, it was the first time the story of African Americans was told in their own words on television; Purlie Victorious (1963; also known as Gone Are the Days!), the film version of Ossie Davis' acclaimed stage play starring Davis, Ruby Dee, and Alan Alda in his first film role) and the ABC special Ridin' the Rails: The Great American Train Story (1974), which featured Johnny Cash (the program was re-released by Wea Corp. in 2005).

== Santa Conquers the Martians ==
His well-known work is the sole feature film Santa Claus Conquers the Martians (1964), a children's favorite for more than 40 years and noteworthy to trivia buffs as Pia Zadora's first film. It was originally reviewed as "a children's film adults won't mind sitting through", though it was later listed by the Medved brothers as one of the 50 worst films of all time and mocked by the sci-fi TV series Mystery Science Theater 3000, thus ensuring its ongoing cult status).

== Accolades ==
- 1972: Technical Emmy Award nomination for The Plot to Murder Hitler: The Last Days of John D
