= Santa Claus Conquers the Martians =

1964 film directed by Nicholas Webster

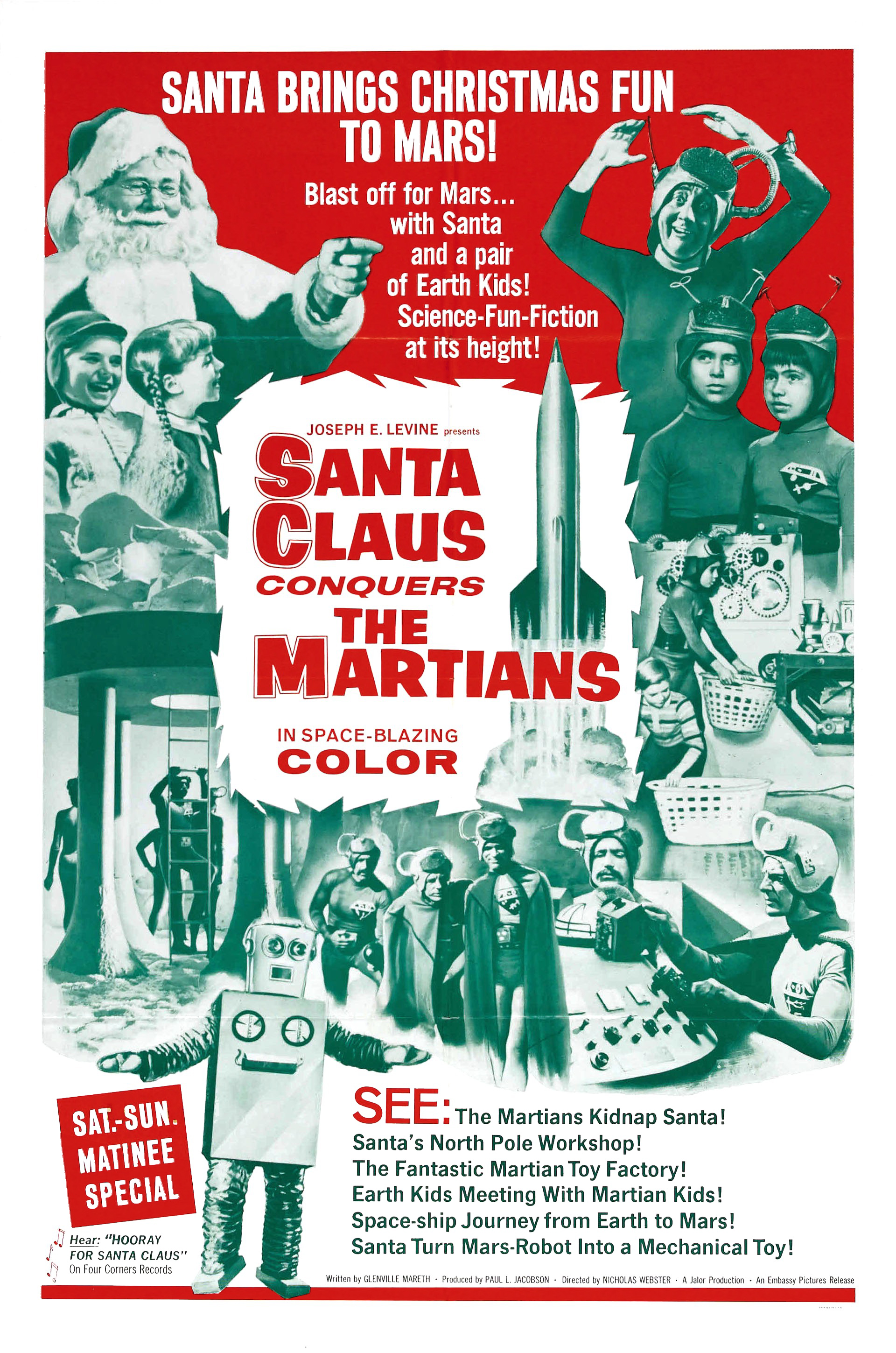
- Theatrical release poster
- Directed by: Nicholas Webster
- Screenplay by: Paul L. Jacobson
- Story by: Glenville Mareth
- Produced by: Paul L. Jacobson
- Starring: John Call; Leonard Hicks; Vincent Beck; Bill McCutcheon; Victor Stiles; Donna Conforti; Chris Month; Pia Zadora; Leila Martin; Charles Renn
- Cinematography: David L. Quaid
- Edited by: Bill Henry
- Music by: Milton DeLugg
- Production company: Jalor Productions
- Distributed by: Embassy Pictures
- Release date: November 14, 1964
- Running time: 81 minutes
- Country: United States
- Language: English
- Budget: $200,000 (estimated)

Santa Claus Conquers the Martians is a 1964 American Christmas science fiction comedy film directed by Nicholas Webster. John Call stars as Santa Claus, ten-year-old Pia Zadora as Girmar the Martian girl, and Doris Rich as Mrs. Claus.

Santa Claus Conquers the Martians regularly appears on lists of the worst films ever made. It was featured in episodes of Canned Film Festival in 1986, Mystery Science Theater 3000 in 1991, and Elvira's Movie Macabre.

== Plot ==
The Martians Momar (Mom Martian) and Kimar (King Martian) are worried that their children Girmar (Girl Martian) and Bomar (Boy Martian) are watching too much Earth television, most notably station KID-TV's interview with Santa Claus in his workshop at Earth's North Pole.

Chochem, an 800-year-old Martian sage, advises them that the children of Mars are growing distracted due to the society's overly rigid structure. From infancy, all their education is fed into their brains through machines and they are not allowed individuality or freedom of thought.

Chochem notes that he had seen this coming "for centuries" and says that the only way to help the children is to allow them their freedom and be allowed to have fun. To do this, Mars needs a Santa Claus figure, like on Earth. Leaving Chochem's cave, the Martian leaders decide to abduct Santa Claus from Earth and bring him to Mars.

Struggling to distinguish between various Santa impersonators, the Martians decide to kidnap two Earth children to find the real one. Once this is accomplished, one Martian, Voldar, who strongly disagrees with the idea, repeatedly tries to kill Santa, believing that he is corrupting the children of Mars and turning them away from the planet's original glory.

When they arrive on Mars, Santa and the children build a factory to make toys for the Martian children. However, Voldar and his assistants, Stobo and Shim, sabotage the factory and change its programming so that it makes the toys incorrectly. Meanwhile, Dropo, Kimar's assistant, who has taken a great liking to Santa Claus and Christmas, puts on one of Santa's spare suits and starts acting like him. After arriving at the toy factory, Voldar mistakes Dropo for the real Santa and kidnaps him.

When Santa and the children come back to the factory to make more toys, they discover that someone has tampered with the machines. Voldar and Stobo come back to the factory to make a deal with Kimar, but when they see the real Santa Claus, they realize that their plan has been foiled. Dropo, held hostage in a cave, tricks his guard Shim and escapes. Kimar then arrests Voldar, Stobo, and Shim. Santa notices that Dropo acts like him and says that Dropo would make a good Martian Santa Claus. Kimar agrees and sends Santa and the children back to Earth.

== Cast ==
- John Call as Santa Claus
- Leonard Hicks as Kimar
- Vincent Beck as Voldar
- Bill McCutcheon as Dropo
- Victor Stiles as Billy Foster
- Donna Conforti as Betty Foster
- Chris Month as Bomar
- Pia Zadora as Girmar
- Leila Martin as Momar
- Charles Renn as Hargo
- James Cahill as Rigna
- Ned Wertimer as Andy Anderson
- Doris Rich as Mrs. Claus
- Carl Don as Chochem / Von Green
- Ivor Bodin as Winky
- Al Nesor as Stobo
- Don Blair as announcer
- Gene Lindsey as polar bear

== Production ==
The film was the idea of producer Paul Jacobson, who worked in video production and wanted to move into features. He hired writer Glenville Mareth to develop the idea and Nicholas Webster to direct, and made the film through his own Jalor Productions. Jacobson called the film a "yuletide science fiction fantasy" and said he made it because of a perceived gap in the market. "Except for the Disney's, there's very little in film houses that children recognize as their own."

Jacobson succeeded in selling the film's distribution rights to Joseph E. Levine. Filming took place over two weeks from July to August 1964 at the Michael Myerberg Studios on Long Island.

Jacobson said "at this particular studio, with a group of wonderfully cooperative technicians, we've been able to get a lot of production value from our low budget. We're also shooting in color to get full, picturesque effects with our toy factors and Martian and North Pole backgrounds." Cast members John Call and Victor Stiles were appearing on stage in Oliver! while Donna Conforti was appearing in Here's Love on Broadway.

In an interview in June 1966, Levine said he had made 15 "family type pictures" in 18 months "but don't let it get around. I don't want anybody to know because families don't go to see them—they just talk about them. But I make them anyway because I have the protection of the television. Money in the bank, the television."

== Release ==
The 69 minute cut of the film

The film was released in time for Christmas 1964. After that, it was regularly re-released around Christmas for matinees.

=== Home media ===
Due to its public domain status in the United States, Santa Claus Conquers the Martians has been released on many different bargain bin price labels. StudioCanal holds ancillary rights to the film.

- Originally broadcast on Comedy Central on December 21, 1991, the Mystery Science Theater 3000 version of the film was released on DVD by Rhino Home Video as part of MST3K: The Essentials on August 31, 2004.
- Mill Creek Entertainment released the film on DVD as part of their Holiday Family Collection in 2006.
- Cinematic Titanic riffed the film on DVD, released in November 2008.
- The Cinema Insomnia version was released by Apprehensive Films as part of their Slime Line series.
- The bonus content of the DVD Rare Exports: A Christmas Tale includes the film.
- E1 Entertainment's version from the 2010-11 syndicated television series, Elvira's Movie Macabre, was released on DVD on December 6, 2011.
- Kino Lorber planned to release a Santa Claus Conquers the Martians: Kino Classics Special Edition on Blu-ray and DVD on October 30, 2012. However, it was discovered that the discs had been pressed using a severely truncated master copy, running only 69 minutes. A new version was released on December 4, 2012, with the original running time intact.
- RiffTrax, a production of several former MST3K writers and performers, selected the film for riffing in a live event held on December 5, 2013, and broadcast to movie theaters around the country. The live show became available as a digital download on August 1, 2014 and was released on DVD on November 24, 2015. The show was presented as a double feature with Christmas Shorts-stravaganza!, a RiffTrax collection of holiday shorts, on December 1, 2016.
- It is also part of Weird Christmas on Fandor.

== Reception ==
=== Box office ===
In February 1965, the New York Times said on its release that the film "reaped a box office bonanza in a regular, multi theatre booking".

=== Critical ===
Santa Claus Conquers the Martians received mostly negative reviews, with most of its positive feedback coming in the form of the film being "so bad it's good". On the film review aggregator website Rotten Tomatoes, the film has a 25% score, based on 24 reviews, with an average rating of 3.4/10. The site's critical consensus reads, "The endearingly cheesy Santa Claus Conquers the Martians might just be so naughty it's nice for viewers seeking a sub-competent sci-fi holiday adventure." The film has since been viewed as a cult film.

== Legacy ==
The theme from the film was released on record in November 1964 by "Milton Delugg and the Little Eskimos" on Four Corners Records, a subsidiary of Kapp Records. Its catalog number is FC 4-114. It did not reach the charts. The trumpeter Al Hirt that year released a singles version of the theme, with the other side of the record being "White Christmas".

A single-issue comic book adaptation and read-along of the film was published by Dell Comics in March 1966.

The film was featured in season 3 episode 21 of Mystery Science Theater 3000 in 1991.

A theatrical production of Santa Claus Conquers the Martians: The Musical premiered in 1993 at the Factory Theatre in Chicago, adapted and directed by Sean Abley.

Beginning in February 1998, a remake was rumored with David Zucker as producer, and Jim Carrey attached to play Dropo. An estimated release date was announced as 2002, though the film was then believed to have gone into development hell. As of December 2020, IMDb lists a remake with a projected 2021 release date, directed by Cynthia Webster, the daughter of the original film's director.

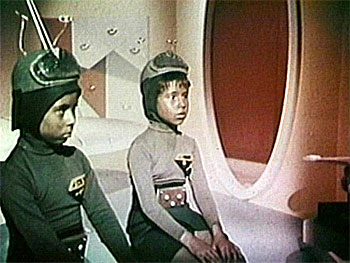
A shot from the opening scene featuring Bomar (Chris Month) and Girmar (Pia Zadora) watching Earth television from Mars

It spawned a tongue-in-cheek novelization by Lou Harry, released in 2005 by Penguin Books/Chamberlain Bros. The book, which includes a DVD of the original film, presents the story from the perspective of a now-adult Girmar, who has not only succeeded her father as the ruler of Mars but also narrates the tale in a valley girl type of language.

In 2006, a second theatrical production premiered at the Maverick Theater in Fullerton, California. This version was adapted by Brian Newell and Nick McGee. The Maverick's production has become a comedic success and a local tradition that has been performed there every holiday season since 2006, with a 10th-anniversary production being performed in December 2015.

In 2016, a third theatrical adaptation premiered at The Red Curtain Foundation for the Arts in Marysville, Washington, this version written and directed by Nick Poling. Like the film, the script for this adaptation is in the public domain.

The Indiana based punk band Sloppy Seconds covered the theme song in 1992.

The 2026 horror film Backrooms features a scene of the main character watching the movie on his television.

== See also ==
- Santa Claus in film
- List of Christmas films
- List of cult films
- List of films set on Mars
- List of films considered the worst
- List of American films of 1964
- Public domain film
- List of films in the public domain in the United States
