= Dick Tracy Meets Gruesome =

1947 film by John Rawlins

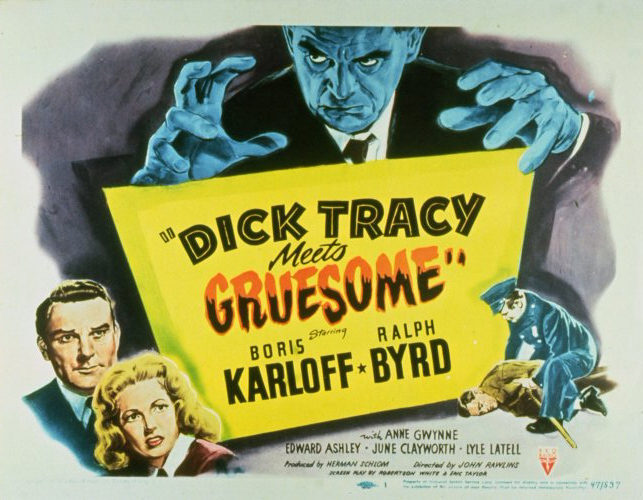
- Promotional Poster
- Directed by: John Rawlins
- Written by: Characters: Chester Gould; Story: William Graffis; Robert E. Kent
- Screenplay by: Robertson White; Eric Taylor
- Produced by: Herman Schlom
- Starring: Boris Karloff; Ralph Byrd; Anne Gwynne
- Cinematography: Frank Redman
- Edited by: Elmo Williams
- Music by: Paul Sawtell
- Production company: RKO Radio Pictures
- Distributed by: RKO Radio Pictures
- Release date: September 26, 1947 (U.S.)
- Running time: 65 minutes
- Country: United States
- Language: English

Dick Tracy Meets Gruesome (also known as Dick Tracy Meets Karloff and Dick Tracy's Amazing Adventure (UK) ) is a 1947 American thriller film directed by John Rawlins and starring Boris Karloff, Ralph Byrd and Anne Gwynne. The film is the fourth and final installment of the Dick Tracy film series released by RKO Radio Pictures.

== Plot ==
Just out of jail, Gruesome goes to the Hangman's Knot saloon, where his old crime crony, Melody, is now playing piano. Gruesome takes him to a plastics manufacturer, where X-Ray and a mysterious mastermind are in possession of a secret formula and hatching a sinister plot.

Ignoring a warning not to touch anything, Gruesome sniffs the gas from a mysterious test tube; he escapes the toxic fumes but collapses upon returning to the Hangman's Knot and is taken to the city morgue, where his body stiffens dramatically.

Dick Tracy is at headquarters speaking with college professor Dr. A. Tomic, a scientist who suspects someone has been following him. At the morgue, Tracy's sidekick Pat has his back turned when Gruesome wakes up and knocks him out. Pat describes him to Tracy as looking a lot like the actor Boris Karloff (a gag cribbed from Arsenic and Old Lace).

At a bank where Tess Trueheart happens to be, Gruesome and Melody drop a grenade with the gas into a wastebasket; when it goes off, everyone but Tess freezes in place. They rob the place of more than $100,000 and shoot a cop on the sidewalk before Tracy and his men arrive. Gruesome demands half of the loot from X-Ray .... or else.

Tracy tries to learn the secret of the formula from Dr. Tomic's top assistant, Professor Learned, before going after Gruesome and his gang. Over the course of the film, Learned is shot dead, and Melody dies in a car accident. As an offhand comment, Tess quips "dead men tell no tales", which gives Tracy an idea: since Gruesome will resort even to murder to keep his secret weapon a secret, if he thinks Melody is alive, he will hunt Melody down to prevent any leaks. Tracy decides to run a false flag operation: put out word that Melody has been captured alive, and pose as Melody hoping Gruesome will show up. Gruesome takes the bait and abducts what he thinks is Melody from the hospital. In a climactic shootout at the plastic factory, Tracy shoots Gruesome in the back.

Tracy retrieves one last gas grenade with the intent of analyzing the contents. Back at the office, in the closing scene, the grenade inadvertently goes off, freezing everyone in place just as Dick and Tess are about to kiss.

== Cast ==
- Boris Karloff as Gruesome
- Ralph Byrd as Dick Tracy
- Anne Gwynne as Tess Truehart
- Skelton Knaggs as Rudolph X-Ray
- Edward Ashley as Dr. Lee Thal
- June Clayworth as Dr. I.M. Learned
- Lyle Latell as Pat Patton
- Tony Barrett as 'Melody' Fiske
- James Nolan as Dan Sterne
- Joseph Crehan as Chief Brandon
- Milton Parsons as Dr. A. Tomic

== Legacy ==
- In 2007, Dick Tracy Meets Gruesome was shown on the horror hosted television series Cinema Insomnia. Apprehensive Films later released the Cinema Insomnia episode onto DVD.
- On October 16, 2014, writer Mike Curtis and artist Joe Staton introduced a version of the Gruesome character into the Dick Tracy comic strip. They introduced a character inspired by Melody (Mel O. Dee) on October 27 of that year. The cartoonists carry the joke further. Gruesome had had plastic surgery done to change his appearance, by a Dr. Einstein and Gruesome gets drafted to portray Jonathon Brewster in a production of Arsenic and Old Lace.
- US band Poet Named Revolver, from Nashville, Tennessee, released an album called Meets Gruesome. Recorded in 2007, first released in 2008, and reissued in 2014 by No Kings Record Cadre, with visual references to the film.
