= Mr. Lobo =

American television personality (born 1970)

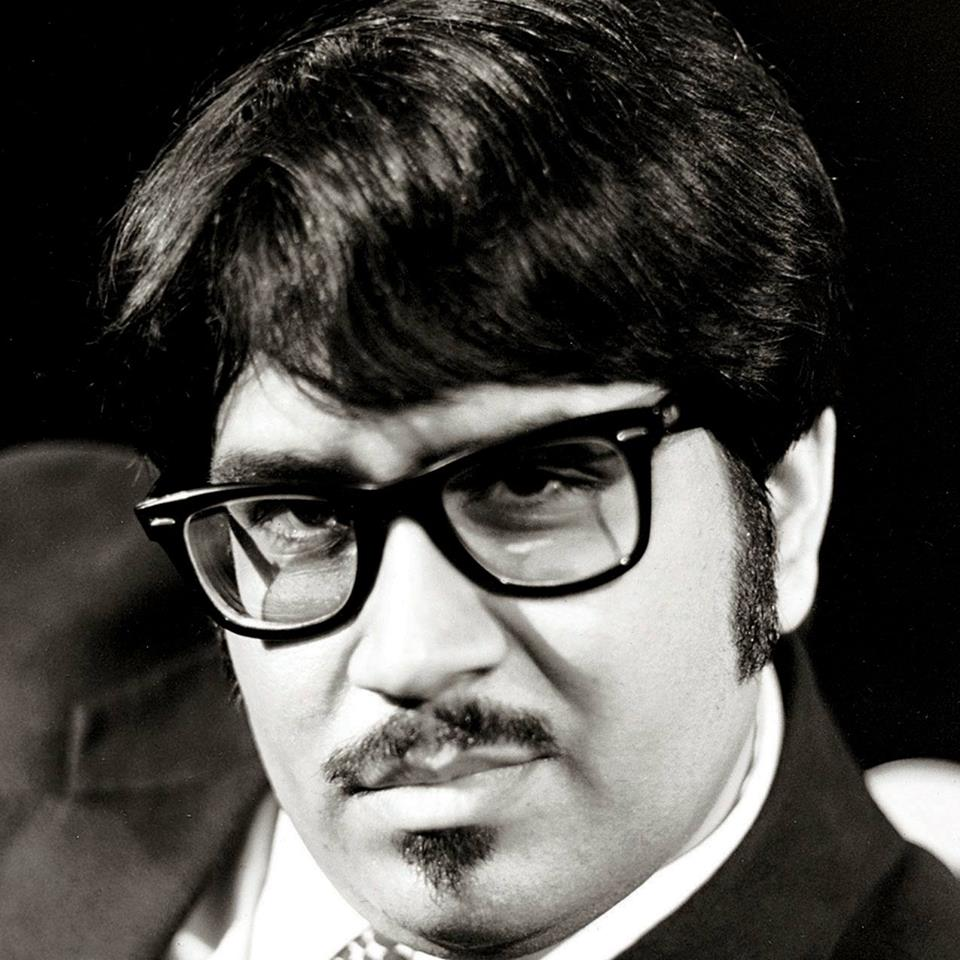
- Born: November 27, 1970 (age 55); Sacramento, California, U.S.
- Other name: Erik Lobo
- Occupations: Artist; satirist; genre actor; television personality; filmmaker; Master of Ceremonies
- Years active: 1990–present
- Style: Satire
- Height: 6 ft 3 in (1.91 m)
- Partner: Dixie Dellamorto
- Website: www.cinemainsomnia.com

Erik Lobo (born November 27, 1970), better known by his stage name Mr. Lobo, is an American artist and comedic actor best known as the horror host of the nationally syndicated American television series Cinema Insomnia. In 2022, he was inducted into the Rondo Hatton Classic Horror Awards' Monster Kid Hall of Fame.

== Career ==
After going to school for print technology, Mr. Lobo published many humor zine and underground comics. Mr. Lobo is a very prolific freelance artist and writer with numerous multimedia credits and clients. He wrote, directed, and performed Radio Theater for 9 years. Mr. Lobo is a short film and commercial director. He was the head writer for a long running local cabaret/parody talk show The Moe Bettermann Show. Mr. Lobo has been covered in several horror magazines and in the national news. He has also participated in many B-movies, offbeat genre films and documentaries.

=== Documentaries ===
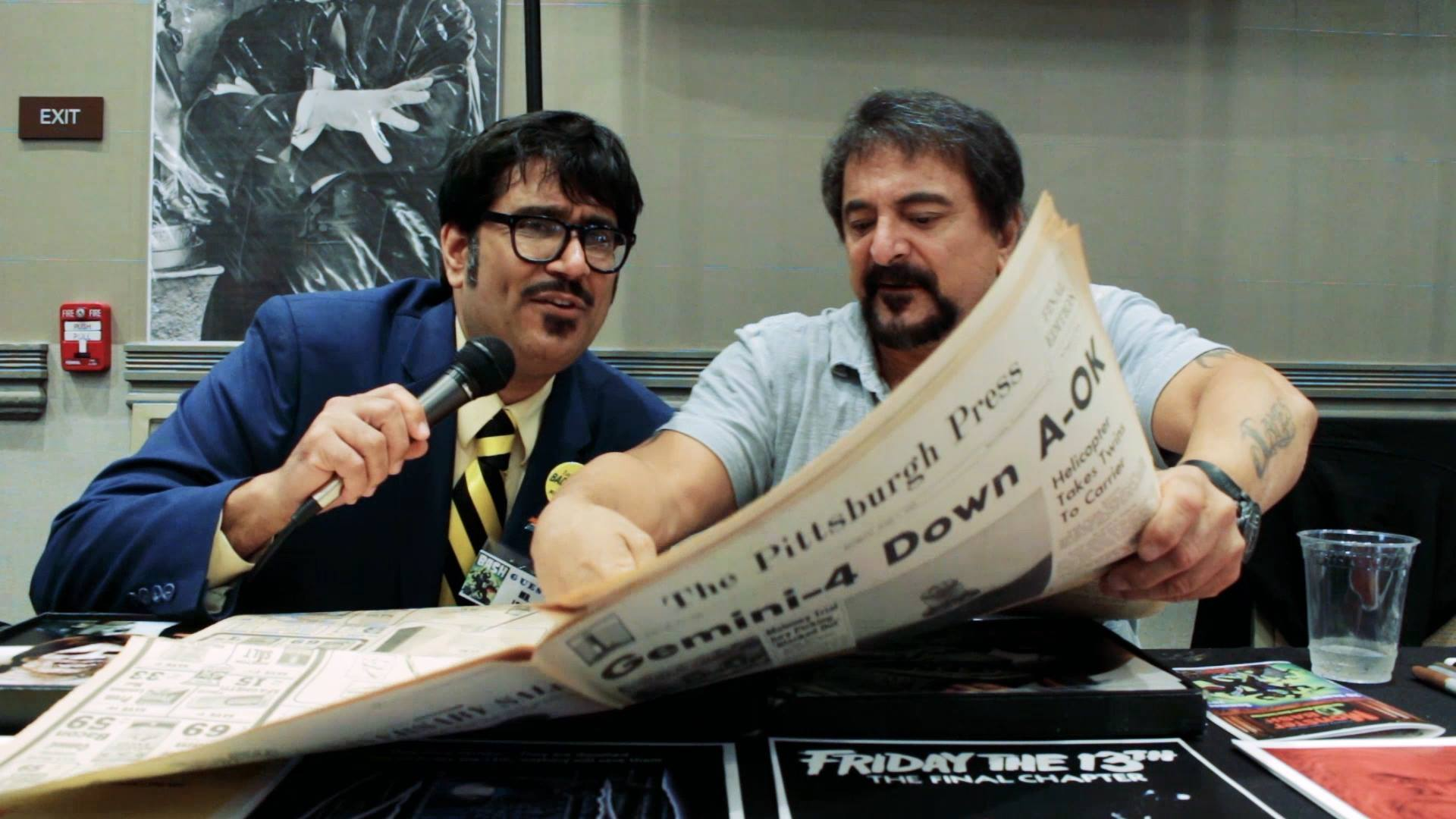
Mr. Lobo interviewing Tom Savini

Mr. Lobo was interviewed for American Scary, appeared in the supplementary content on Every Other Day is Halloween, interviewed for I Dream of Being an Artist... And It Makes Me Sick, was a consultant on Watch Horror Films... Keep America Strong, produced and hosted the featurette Bob Wilkins: The Sacramento Years, introduced the short documentary "I Was a TV Horror Host: The John Stanley Story" and is the host of Virginia Creepers.

Mr. Lobo is also interviewed in the short retrospective Citizen Wood: Making "The Bride", Unmaking the Legend about the making of Bride of the Monster featured on the volume 19 DVD set of Mystery Science Theater 3000.

=== Directing ===
In 1993 Mr. Lobo co-produced and directed a short film titled Street Art which won an award with the Film Arts Foundation in San Francisco. He directed a commercial for the California Tree Fruit Growers Association that was a parody of old Slinky commercials titled "Pit Popper". Mr. Lobo directed animation for a public service announcement called Deputysaurus Rex for the Sacramento Sheriff's Department. He also directed animation for an educational film called Splash: The Mysteries of Vernal Pools which has been seen by over 10,000 school children. In 2009 Toy Fusion asked Mr. Lobo to direct a humorous G.I. Joe fan film which involved rare and forgotten G.I. Joe collectibles and they won two awards at JoeCon that year. Most notably in 2010 Mr. Lobo got to work with legendary exploitation film director Ted V. Mikels to work as a second unit director on the new film Astro-Zombies: M3 Cloned.

=== Radio and voice work ===
He wrote, directed, and performed Radio Theater for the University of California Davis Radio Station (KDVS) from 1987 to 1992 and picked up again from 1996 to 2000. His two most notable projects are Radio is Dead which was performed as a stage play in Sacramento, San Francisco and Chicago; and The Last Thanksgiving which was a live remote parody of The War of the Worlds. He did the voice over for numerous local TV spots for Pulte Homes and Super Cuts. Mr. Lobo voiced the "Pit Popper" in the California Tree Fruit Growers Association commercial. He was also the voice of Deputysaurus Rex for the Sacramento Sheriff's Department and Professor X. Plorer in the school film Splash: The Mysteries of Vernal Pools. Mr. Lobo is the voice of Larry Scholls Ghost Train both on the commercials and on the hot-line. He was the voice of the Oracle in Midnight of my Life. Mr. Lobo also narrates all of the trailers for Apprehensive Films including the 30th anniversary promo reel for Hardware Wars.

=== Live shows ===
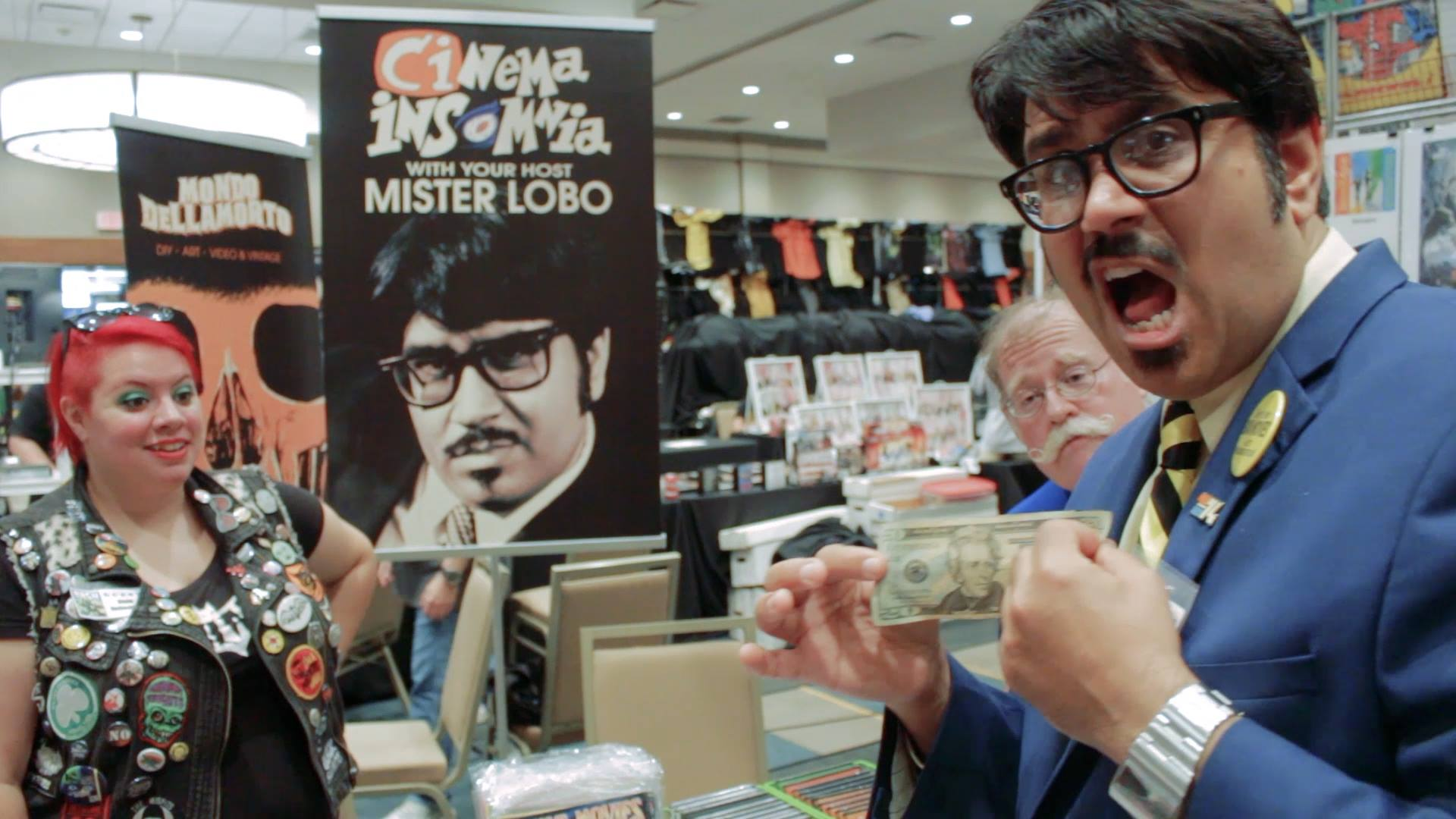
Mr. Lobo and friends at Monster Bash 2017

Mr. Lobo makes numerous live appearances at conventions such as ComicCon in San Diego, California, WonderCon in San Francisco, California, Screamfest in Vero Beach, Florida, The B-Movie Celebration in Franklin, Indiana, Blobfest in Phoenixville, Pennsylvania and Monster Bash near Pittsburgh, Pennsylvania. He also takes part in live film shows at the Crest Theatre in Sacramento, California, the Parkway Theater in Oakland, California Cinefamily Theater in Hollywood, California, The Castro Theater in San Francisco, California, Artcraft Theatre in Franklin, Indiana, The Colonial Theater in Phoenixville, Pennsylvania, as well as many others. On August 14, 2010, Cinema Insomnia had their first broadcast taping at the Guild Theater in Sacramento in front of a live audience. The film presented was The Undertaker and His Pals and due to the graphic nature of the film, everyone was given a 'Barf-O-Vision' Audience Sickness Bag.

=== Art ===
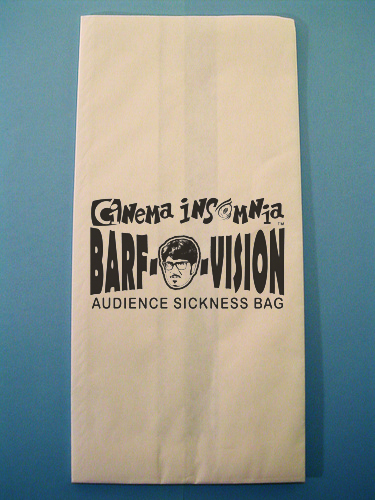
Barf-O-Vision bag

Mr. Lobo has designed, not only much of the cover art for the Cinema Insomnia DVDs, but the art for many other Apprehensive Films releases as Hardware Wars and The Undertaker and his Pals. In 1995 Mr. Lobo put out his own line of trading cards which he wrote and illustrated wrapped in a faux wax pack he also created. He also designed the packages for Horror Host Graveyard's Horror Host trading cards as well as help design the Hardware Wars trading cards.

=== Comics ===
In 1991 Mr. Lobo wrote, illustrated and self-published an underground comic in full color called Nuke Nova, a post-apocalyptic comedy about a futuristic hero. Nuke Nova was distributed by Diamond and Capital City to comic book stores across the United States.

Mr. Lobo has also published the comic series Funny Pages:

- Funny Pages (1995), a 100+ page satirical humor trade paperback which was a collaboration with many artists and writers, most notably Joseph Sweeden, Tom Working, and Chris Grill. It was distributed via Tower Books.
- Funny Pages 2D (1997), which was also a collaboration and distributed by Tower.
- Funny Pages 2X: "Zombie the Little Undead Boy". As well as "Harley the Tuff Li'l Biker Slut". Both featured in a standard comic book sized flip book that parodied Harvey Comics like Casper.

Mr. Lobo wrote both issues of the Queen of Trash comic book and inked the first issue. Recently, Mr. Lobo lent his writing talent to the comic 13 Hosts illustrated by Brian Maze.

=== OSI74 ===
In 2015, Mr Lobo and his wife, graphic artist Dixie Lobo, founded OSI74, an online web television channel. The channel was created as a permanent platform for Cinema Insomnia, and as a host channel for shows created by independent producers from around the world. OSI74 specialises in broadcasting horror host movies, independently-produced television shows, orphaned programmes from public access and community television, and shows by Church of the SubGenius.

While functioning primarily as a video on-demand service from Roku and from its website, OSI74 began broadcasting a 24-hour stream from Twitch in 2021. In 2022, Mr Lobo and OSI74 opened up their first original production space, OSI Studios.

=== Other appearances ===
On December 11, 2009, Mr. Lobo was the guest on the late-night syndicated radio talk show Coast to Coast AM. On the second hour, the infamous caller and right-wing extremist "J.C." called in to denounce Mr. Lobo and horror hosts in general. Mr. Lobo also has a cameo in the music video for the song "Hot Sahara" by the band Fans of Jimmy Century. On October 21, 2010, Mr. Lobo posted a video response to Elvira's "Elvira's Not a Witch" viral video on YouTube titled "Re: Elvira's Not a Witch". It was a spoof on Elvira's video which was a parody of Christine O'Donnell's popular "I'm Not A Witch" ad. On October 30, 2010, Mr. Lobo did a spoken word parody complaining about how much the song "Monster Mash" is played.

In 2019, Mr. Lobo can be seen in several of the Cinemassacre "Rental Reviews" videos on YouTube. He plays the landlord for the building.

In 2020, Mr. Lobo was interviewed by reporter Paul Dale Roberts, for the Costa Rican Times.

On April 5, 2021, Mr. Lobo was a feature guest on "Time for the Show".

== Acting ==
Mr. Lobo is cast as Criswell in John Johnson's upcoming remake of Plan 9 From Outer Space. In addition, for the purpose of promoting the film on the internet, Mr. Lobo has produced 62 episodes of Criswell Predicts! which is a parody and homage to the original television program. He also hosts John Johnson's biweekly "Choose Your Own Adventure"-type web series called Spade.

=== Filmography ===
| Year | Film | Role | Director |
|---|---|---|---|
| 2004 | Midnight of my Life | The Oracle | Bob Moricz |
| 2005 | El Tigre Diablo and the Curse of the Golden Skull | An Eye Witness | Trash Film Orgy |
| 2007 | Palace of Stains | Narrator | Bob Moricz |
| 2007 | Mark of the Damned | The Unknowable Fantazmarak | Eric Miller |
| 2008 | Skeleton Key 2 | Horror Host | John Johnson |
| 2010 | Fall of an Actor | Narrator | Joel Wyncoop |
| 2010 | Baby Jane? | Afternoon Movie Host | Billy Clift |
| 2010 | 30 Second Doom | Count Lobo | Gary Hughes |
| 2010 | Taste the Blood of Frankenstein | Mr. Lobo the History Revisionist | Eric Miller & Mr. Lobo |
| 2010 | Astro-Zombies: M3 Cloned | Man in Black & Dead Toy Shop keeper | Ted V. Mikels & Mr. Lobo |
| 2010 | The Taint | Cockzantium Spokesperson | Drew Bolduc |
| 2011 | Planet of the Vampire Women | Future Mr. Lobo | Trash Film Orgy |
| 2011 | A Hard Day's Nightmare | Cinema Insomnia Host, Mr. Lobo | Richard Something |
| 2015 | Plan 9 | Criswell | John Johnson |
| 2022 | Feeders 3 | Introductory Host | Mark Polonia |
| 2022 | Psychic Vampire | The Creator | Tate Hoffmaster |
| pre-production | Dogtown Zombies | Horror Host | Paul Benton |
| pre-production | Planet Frankenstein | ???? | Newt Wallen |
| pre-production | Mars Vs. Cheerleaders | Scientist | Newt Wallen |
| post-production | It Came from Trafalgar | Horror Host | Solomon Mortimur |
| post-production | Survivors | Zombie Mr. Lobo | James Clarkson |
| post-production | Midnight Show | Various Characters | Newt Wallen |

== Religion ==
Mr. Lobo is a reverend to both Church of the SubGenius and Universal Life Church. On October 4/5, 2003, he was canonized as the "Patron Saint of late night movie hosts and insomniacs" in the Church of Ed Wood.

== Controversy ==
During a Q&A session at the Sacramento Horror Film Festival, wrestler Chris Jericho referred to Mr. Lobo several times as "Hadji" — a racial slur against Middle Easterners. Lobo is not Middle Eastern and took little offense. After the first affront — and a shot at Paris Hilton — Lobo jokingly took Jericho's drink to apparently sniff it for booze. Jericho's response to this was "it's apple juice, fag." which led to a huge public outcry by civil rights groups. Video from the event appeared on TMZ and triggered a series of mock videos resulting in Lobo challenging Jericho and subsequently beating him at a thumb wrestling match in a video featuring Chris Perguidi. Lobo later recounted the events and had another confrontation with a "pseudo Jericho" in a live reunion of Lobo's old comedy troupe The Moe Bettermann Show.

== In popular culture ==
In the first episode of the animated series Scooby-Doo! Mystery Incorporated, "Beware the Beast from Below", the unmasked villain Professor Emmanuel Raffalo is inspired by Mr. Lobo.
