= Venus Flytrap (film) =

- Directed by: Norman Earl Thomson
- Screenplay by: Norman Earl Thomson
- Story by: Ed Wood (Uncredited)
- Produced by: Norman Earl Thomson
- Starring: James Craig; James Yagi; Atsuko Rome
- Cinematography: Arnold Dibble
- Edited by: Kenneth G. Crane
- Distributed by: Toei Company
- Release date: 1970
- Running time: 94 minutes
- Countries: United States; Japan
- Languages: Japanese; English

Venus Flytrap (also known as Body of the Prey (working title) is a 1970 American-Japanese science fiction horror film shot partly in Japan. It was distributed by the Toei Company of Japan. The film was released in Japan as Akuma no Niwa (The Devil's Garden).

The plot features a mad scientist who uses lightning to turn carnivorous plants into sentient man-eating creatures. The film was later released on U.S. video as The Revenge of Dr. X and Body of the Prey,

Based on an unproduced 1950s screenplay written by an uncredited Ed Wood, the film was directed and produced by pulp writer Norman Earl Thomson. (Thomson rewrote Wood's screenplay considerably.)

Credit is often incorrectly given to the editor Kenneth G. Crane, who directed the 1959 American-Japanese horror film The Manster. The American video release print additionally erroneously featured the credits for a 1969 Philippines production called The Mad Doctor of Blood Island.

== Plot ==
Dr. Bragan (James Craig) is a workaholic rocket scientist at NASA working on a mission to outer space. The stress of the mission causes him to have a mental breakdown, so his assistant, Dr. Paul Nakamura (Yagi), suggests he take a vacation in Japan at his abandoned luxury resort to recuperate. Dr. Bragan accepts his offer and flies to Japan.

In Japan, Dr. Bragan stays at the defunct hotel of Nakamura with Dr. Noriko Hanamura (Kami), the lovely cousin of his coworker who takes on the role of his assistant. Bragan begins a bizarre experiment in botany in the hotel's secluded greenhouse to prove his theory that humans evolved from plants. With a potted Venus flytrap he brought from America, the scientist grafts it to a Japanese carnivorous oceanic plant to create a hybrid creature that becomes humanoid and requires the blood of mammals to flourish. But Bragan is just as obsessive and moody as he was in America, and his behavior causes Noroko to suspect he is going mad, especially when he secretly takes a victim's "heart blood" to feed it. When his creation, "Sectovorus" uproots and begins moving around on its own, it becomes dangerous and it's not long before the creature begins seeking human victims from a nearby village. The villagers riot and Dr. Bragan must decide between protecting his creation or killing it in order to save mankind. He opts to lure it into a nearby volcano.

== Cast ==
- James Craig as Dr. Bragan
- Tota Kondo as Customs officer
- Lawrence O'Neill as American at airport
- Al Ricketts as Gas station owner
- Atsuko Rome as Noriko Hanamura (billed as Ako Kami)
- Edward M. Shannon as Dr. Shannon
- John Stanley as Dr. Stanley
- James Yagi as Dr. Paul Nakamura

Angelique Pettyjohn is credited in the opening credits as one of four cast members, but does not appear in the film.

== Reception ==
Kim Newman found the movie weird and amateurish, but noted it had enough bizarre elements to keep your attention. It is further noted that despite one of the titles, there is no Dr. X. in the film. Creature Feature gave the movie one star.

== Legacy ==
The syndicated series Cinema Insomnia mocked the film on Halloween 2011.

In 2012 RiffTrax released a comedic commentary on the film featuring the voices of Michael J. Nelson, Kevin Murphy and Bill Corbett.

The film is available for streaming for free on many sites, including, as of October 2011, by YouTube

== Production ==
Atsuko Rome had never acted before, instead having been a model and ballet dancer. She praised director Thomson for making the process smooth. The shoot took about a month.

The movie was reportedly discovered years later in a warehouse with no opening credits, and credits from another movie (The Mad Doctor of Blood Island) were sloppily spliced onto the print. This has caused the confusion of the identities of the cast and crew.

== See also ==
- List of American films of 1970
- Ed Wood filmography
