= The Killer Shrews =

1959 film by Ray Kellogg

- Theatrical release poster
- Directed by: Ray Kellogg
- Written by: Jay Simms
- Produced by: Ken Curtis; Gordon McLendon
- Starring: James Best; Ingrid Goude; Ken Curtis; Gordon McLendon; Baruch Lumet; "Judge" Henry Dupree
- Narrated by: Gordon McLendon
- Cinematography: Wilfred M. Cline
- Edited by: Aaron Stell
- Music by: Harry Bluestone; Emil Cadkin
- Distributed by: McLendon-Radio Pictures Distributing Company
- Release date: July 15, 1959
- Running time: 69 minutes
- Country: United States
- Language: English
- Budget: $123,000
- Box office: $1 million

The Killer Shrews is a 1959 American independent science fiction horror film directed by Ray Kellogg, and produced by Ken Curtis and Gordon McLendon. The story follows a group of researchers who are trapped in their remote island compound overnight by a hurricane and find themselves under siege by their abnormally large and venomous mutant test subjects. The film stars James Best, Ingrid Goude, Ken Curtis, McLendon, Baruch Lumet and "Judge" Henry Dupree.

Shot outside of Dallas, Texas, it was produced back-to-back with The Giant Gila Monster. It played in theaters on a double feature with The Giant Gila Monster.

Now in the public domain, the film has been issued multiple DVD releases and was lampooned in the fourth season of Mystery Science Theater 3000.

== Plot ==
Captain Thorne Sherman and first mate Rook Griswold deliver supplies by ship to a research compound on a remote island. The station inhabitants (consisting of scientist Marlowe Craigis, his research assistant Radford Baines, Marlowe's daughter Ann, her fiancé Jerry Farrel, and a servant Mario) give them a cold welcome and direct them to unload the ship and leave immediately with Ann, even though a hurricane is approaching the island. Thorne insists that the storm will be too severe for them to leave that night and so instead goes to the compound, while Rook stays with the boat.

Marlowe explains he has been trying to isolate the genes responsible for growth and metabolism in order to shrink humans to half their size so as to reduce the impact of human overpopulation. He uses shrews as test animals due to their short lifespan, allowing him to track results over multiple generations. As Thorne and Ann talk that evening, Jerry becomes jealous and confronts Ann. She tells him their engagement is off in light of his earlier cowardice. Thorne opts to return to his boat and avoid the uncomfortable atmosphere, but Ann pulls a gun on him and orders him to stay. She explains that Marlowe's experiments have created a batch of mutant wolf-sized shrews that escaped due to Jerry's drunken negligence and are now reproducing in the wild. The group barricade themselves inside their compound every evening before the sun sets due to the creatures' nocturnal feeding habits. They have not contacted the coast guard so that they can complete their research, predicting that the shrews will cannibalize each other once they have consumed all other food on the island.

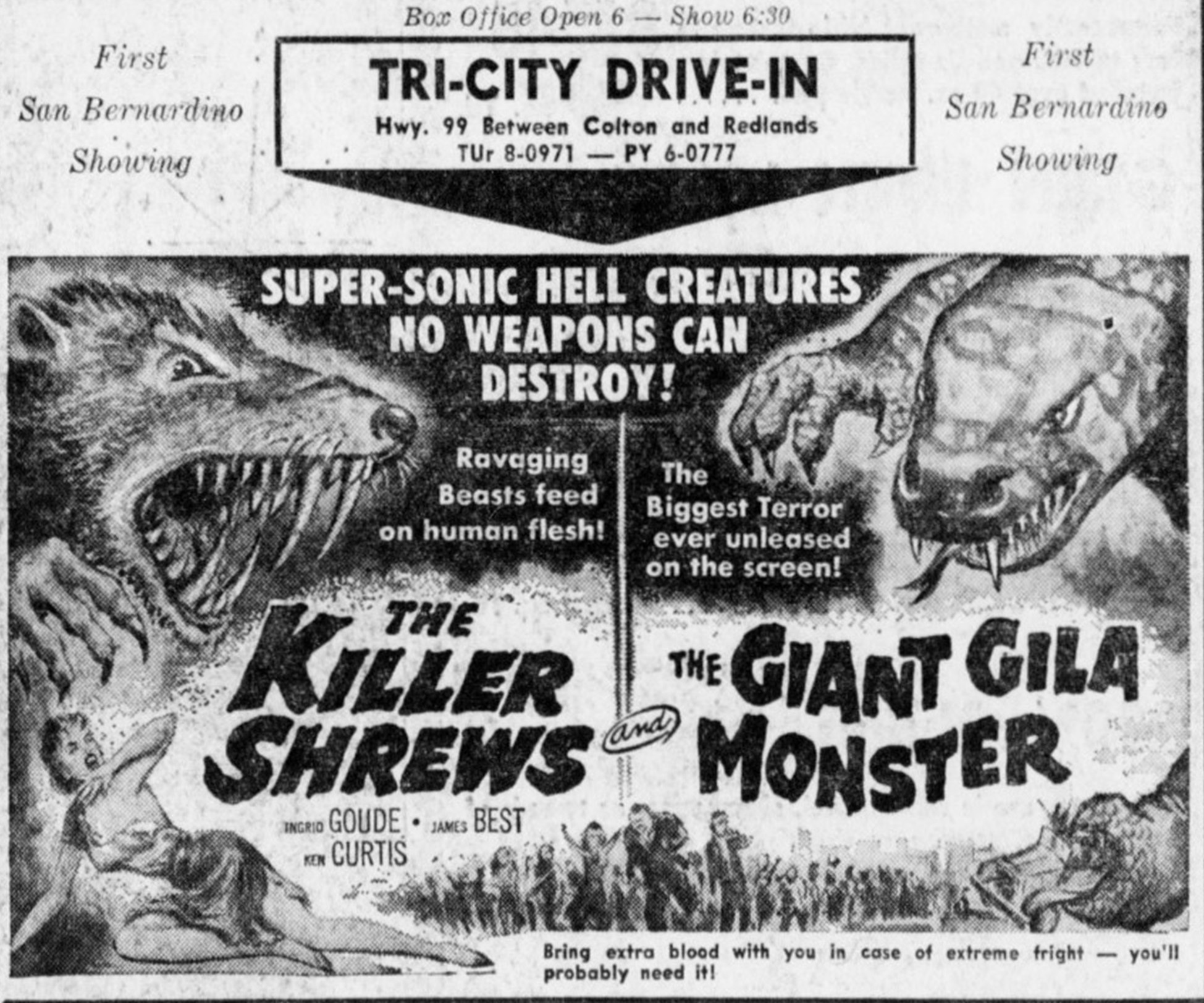
Drive-in advertisement from 1959 for The Killer Shrews with co-feature, The Giant Gila Monster.

Rook comes ashore and is killed by shrews. The storm makes landfall and the shrews dig through the floor of the compound's barn and attack the livestock. Hearing the sound and mistaking it for Rook, Thorne nearly opens the door to let him in but is stopped by Jerry and Marlowe. Thorne points out that while the main building's floor is too hard for the shrews to dig through, the walls are adobe and the storm will turn it to soft mud. Recognizing the danger, the group plans to leave at daybreak.

One of the shrews takes advantage of a broken window and makes its way into the basement. Mario and Thorne hear the noise and follow it downstairs. Mario discovers the shrew and shoots it fatally, but not before it bites him. Thorne treats Mario's wound, but he dies in seconds. Examining the dead shrew, Radford confirms there is a highly toxic venom in its saliva, the result of the shrews adapting to the poisoned bait the researchers placed in an attempt to kill them off.

As day breaks and the storm fades, Thorne and Jerry scout the path off the island. Once away from the compound Jerry threatens Thorne with a gun to his back, ordering him to stay away from Ann. Thorne disarms Jerry. They call Rook to bring the ship ashore. When he does not respond, they follow the path and find the tatters of his clothing. Starving, the shrews break their nocturnal habits and attack. Thorne and Jerry race back to the compound. Jerry reaches it first and tries to leave Thorne locked outside, but Thorne scales the fence. Enraged by the multiple attempts to kill him, Thorne beats Jerry senseless and nearly throws him to the shrews in a fit of anger. Another shrew gets in and bites Radford, killing him.

As more shrews chew through the walls, Thorne hits upon the idea to fashion impromptu armor by lashing together empty 50-gallon chemical drums and then duckwalking to the beach. Due to his claustrophobia, Jerry refuses to get into the drums, isolating himself on the roof and watching the shrews chase after the lashed-together drums. When the coast seems clear Jerry runs towards shore but is cut off and killed by shrews. Thorne, Ann, and Marlowe reach the shoreline, ditch the armor, and swim out to the boat. Safely aboard and confident that they will make it back to the mainland, Thorne and Ann share a kiss.

== Cast ==
- James Best as Captain Thorne Sherman
- Ingrid Goude as Ann Craigis
- Ken Curtis as Jerry Farrell
- Gordon McLendon as Dr. Radford Baines
- Baruch Lumet as Dr. Marlowe Craigis
- "Judge" Henry Dupree as Rook Griswold
- Alfred DeSoto as Mario

== Production ==
Principal photography took place outside of Dallas, Texas. Special effects were provided by first-time director Kellogg, who served as the head of 20th Century Fox's special effects department throughout most of the 1950s. Close-ups of the shrews were filmed using hand puppets, and for the wider shots, coonhounds were costumed as the shrews.

This low-budget feature was regarded as one of the more successful "regional films". Unlike other regional films, however, it received national and even foreign distribution.

== Release ==
=== Home media ===
The Killer Shrews was released on DVD in 1999 by Diamond Entertainment Corporation as a double feature set with the creature feature The Giant Gila Monster. In 2001 it appeared on a DVD double feature with I Bury the Living instead, from Madacy Entertainment, and for the first time as a standalone DVD release, from K-Tel Entertainment. A colorized version of The Killer Shrews was released on DVD by Legend Films in 2007, again as a double feature set with The Giant Gila Monster. The satirical TV show Mystery Science Theater 3000 riffed on the movie in an episode during its fourth season. MST3K's version of The Killer Shrews was released on DVD by Rhino Home Video as part of the show's Volume 7 boxed set. The film was released on Blu-ray by the Film Masters label on September 26, 2023, yet again as part of a double-feature with its original theatrical co-feature The Giant Gila Monster.

== Reception ==
On Rotten Tomatoes, The Killer Shrews holds an approval rating of 50%, based on 10 reviews, with a weighted average rating of 4.6 out of 10. Leonard Maltin awarded the movie 2.5 out of 4 stars, calling it "an inventive but silly sci-fi tale". In a 1976 interview, rock musician Frank Zappa cited this film as one of his favorites.

Despite mixed reviews, the movie was a commercial success. Unlike many American creature features of the time, it was released internationally adding to its profits.

== Sequel and remake ==
- The sequel Return of the Killer Shrews was produced in 2012, again starring Best as Thorne Sherman. Bruce Davison took the role of Jerry. The movie also stars John Schneider and Rick Hurst, Best's co-stars in The Dukes of Hazzard. The length of time between the original feature's release and that of the sequel—more than half a century—marks one of the longest periods in cinema between consecutive films in the same franchise.
- Attack of the Killer Shrews, a remake and parody of the original movie, was released in 2016 by White Lion Studios. Directed by Ken Cosentino, it was shot as a horror comedy with "deliberately awful ... horrible shrew puppets" and a different cast of characters.

== See also ==
- List of American films of 1959
- List of films in the public domain in the United States
