= Mark of the Damned =

2006 film

- Directed by: Eric Miller
- Written by: Joshua Kennedy; Eric Miller
- Produced by: Doris Miller; Eric Miller; Jill Miller; Kitty Miller; Tom Miller; Brandon Powell; Gean Sexton; Tom Sexton; Peggy Singleman; Rick Spears
- Starring: Jeff Bostic; Rob Burns; Josh Kennedy; Amy Kruger; Mr. Lobo; Eric Miller; Miriam; Dan Nicholson; Brandon Powell; Morgan Stone; Casey Tomlin
- Cinematography: Eric Miller
- Edited by: Walker Allan; Eric Miller
- Music by: Josh Kennedy; Casey Tomlin
- Distributed by: Apprehensive Films
- Release date: 2006
- Running time: 105 min.
- Country: United States
- Language: English

Mark of the Damned is a 2006 American horror film directed by Eric Miller. Filmed in black-and-white, it is an homage to the classic El Santo movies.

The film was shown on Cinema Insomnia's 2009 Halloween special.

== References and Links ==
- Mark of the Damned at IMDb
- Mark of the Damned Part 1 on Livestream
- Mark of the Damned Part 2 on Livestream
