= Cinema Insomnia =

- Cinema Insomnia's Long Lost Gigantis Episode.
- Genre: Comedy, Cult
- Created by: Mr. Lobo
- Starring: Mr. Lobo
- Theme music composer: Stan Fong
- Opening theme: "Stompin' at 3 AM" by Stan Fong
- Country of origin: United States
- Original language: English
- No. of seasons: 18
- No. of episodes: 106 (list of episodes)

Production
- Executive producers: Mr. Lobo, Dixie Lobo, Aaron M. Lane, Paul Sanders, Scott Moon, Ernie Fosselius
- Production locations: The Void (setting); Atglen, Pennsylvania, Sacramento, California, & the San Francisco Bay Area (filming locations)
- Running time: 2 hours, 30 Minutes (per episode)
- Production companies: Outer Space International (formerly Cinema Insomnia Productions and FAL Studios)

Original release
- Release: July 28, 2001

Cinema Insomnia is an American television program presented by horror host Mr. Lobo. It began airing in 2001 on KXTV (ABC 10 News) in Sacramento, California, and from 2003 to 2008 was nationally syndicated, airing on broadcast stations across the United States. Since 2015, the program has aired on OSI74 (Outer Space International), a web television service on Roku.

Cinema Insomnia features B movies, namely horror and science fiction films, interspersed with vignettes starring Mr. Lobo, as well as fake commercials, old movie trailers, and other material.

== Format ==
Typically, Mr. Lobo opens each episode by promising to screen a well-known horror or science fiction film (such as Creature from the Black Lagoon or Alien); however budgetary limitations, acts of God or other circumstances invariably force him to show a much lower quality movie (such as Starcrash or Santa Claus Conquers The Martians).

Unlike the various hosts and robots of Mystery Science Theater 3000, Mr. Lobo does not appear while the movie is playing; instead he appears in brief vignettes in between segments of the movie. Also included are fake commercials (one such was for "Rad Abrams – Skateboard Attorney"), old movie trailers, classic commercials, and footage and interviews shot at horror conventions, science fiction conventions, and film festivals across the country.

=== Characters ===
Mr. Lobo always appears on screen with a "70's professional" haircut, wearing "birth control" glasses and a black suit and tie. He acts as a spectral narrator broadcasting from a black void and his only connections to reality are the B-movies he presents. Mr. Lobo has often described himself by saying, "Imagine if you gave Rod Serling's job to someone who is totally incompetent."

Mr. Lobo often has one-sided conversations with Miss Mittens, a houseplant.

=== Recurring characters ===
- Artie-Deco (Hardware Wars)
- Astra Naughty
- Chewchilla the Wookie Monster (Hardware Wars)
- Cosmonauti 74
- Countess Bloodsugar
- Dr. Bling Bling
- Dr. Loco
- Ernie Fosselius
- François Fly (Fly By Night Theater)
- Lady Skank'nstein (The Horror House of Lady Skank'nstein)
- Megafant
- Movie Sniffing Tie
- Naughty Nurse Batty
- Prime-8
- Puddles the Super Turtle
- Rabbi Joe
- Ro-man (Robot Monster)
- Robot Seven D 4
- Slob Zombie
- Super Argo
- The Incredibly Strange Creatures (Band)
- The Robot Monsters (Band)
- The Louisiana Klingons (Trekkies)
- The Phantom of Krankor (Prince of Space)
- The Queen of Trash
- Will the Thrill (Thrillville)
- Young Mr. Lobo

== Broadcast history ==
Cinema Insomnia began in 2001 when showrunner Mr Lobo was working for KXTV (ABC 10 News) in Sacramento. Inspired by Creature Features horror host Bob Wilkins, Lobo suggested a filler segment for the station's late night 3am movie which ran twenty minutes short. KXTV immediately picked up the show upon submission of the pilot episode. Cinema Insmonia ran for 22 episodes (2001–2002) before the show was put on permanent hiatus. The second version of the show was made for local community television Access Sacramento, and ran for one year on Comcast Channel 17 and 18. This version of the show was also distributed to public-access television cable TV stations across the country via the Horror Host Underground. From 2003 to 2008 Cinema Insomnia was nationally syndicated airing on broadcast stations across the country. In 2008 Apprehensive Films, an indie distribution label, signed the show to release exclusive Cinema Insomnia DVDs. In 2009, Apprehensive Films took over the television distribution of the show as well, which resulted in re-licensing the show to AMGTV.

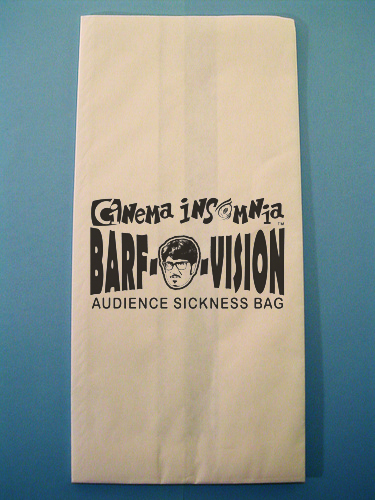
Barf-O-Vision bag

Cinema Insomnia has aired weekly on over 34 broadcast stations including KXTV ABC News10 (Sacramento, Stockton, Modesto, California), KEJB 43 (Louisiana), KTEH 54 (San Jose, Oakland, San Francisco), WOTH (Cincinnati), and WAOH-LP (Cleveland). It also is shown on hundreds of cable systems via MavTV (national), MATA14 (Wisconsin), Cox 71 (Virginia) and Cox 99 (Indiana).

It is delivered to independent stations via various outlets PMI, Access Media Group, and AMGTV. Several episodes are also available for download on the Internet via BitTorrent as well as on CinemaInsomnia.com. The 2006 Cinema Insomnia Halloween Special was delivered to 45 million households.

A Kickstarter project called "Cinema Insomnia 10 Year Anniversary" was started to help fund $10,000 for the new season to give each episode an additional $384 to help pay for cast and crew as well as other expenses. On December 18, 2010, $11,140 had been raised.

The first film of the 2011–2012 season was Venus Flytrap, it premiered on October 31, 2011. This was followed by Deep Red and War of the Planets which was co-hosted by Northern California horror host legend, John Stanley. A retro version of the show called Insomniac Theater featured the film The Atomic Brain and the Christmas special was the original The Little Shop of Horrors.

On October 30, 2015, Mister Lobo launched OSI74 (Outer Space International), a web television service available on Roku. Since then, Cinema Insomnia has aired 90 episodes over 5 seasons on OSI-74.

== Live shows ==
On August 19, 2006, Cinema Insomnia presented Day of the Triffids Live on KTEH, San Jose, CA.

On August 14, 2010, Cinema Insomnia had their first broadcast taping at the Guild Theater in Sacramento in front of a live audience. The film that was presented was The Undertaker and His Pals. Due to the graphic nature of the film, everyone was given a 'Barf-O-Vision' Audience Sickness Bag.

On June 8, 2019, Cinema Insomnia hosted 2 live shows at the Bal Theater in San Leandro, California. The matinee performance was the film Teenagers From Outer Space and the evening performance was Bride of the Monster. These live shows marked the first new appearances in many years of Cinema Insomnia mainstays Rad Abrams: Skateboard Attorney & "The Queen of Trash" Sara Dunn. The Live Shows were later broadcast on Mister Lobo's streaming channel OSI-74.

== Online availability ==
=== Livestream ===
In 2010, Cinema Insomnia episodes began streaming on Livestream.

On July 28, 2021, Mister Lobo ran a 10-day long live marathon of every episode of Cinema Insomnia on the official Cinema Insomnia Twitch channel.

=== YouTube ===
In August 2012, Cinema Insomnia's official YouTube channel was terminated due to multiple third-party claims of copyright infringement which came from "dubious sources."

=== Lobovision ===
In September 2012, a new service to stream Cinema Insomnia videos called Lobovision was made available starting with the episodes House on Haunted Hill and Dick Tracy Meets Gruesome.

In June 2013, Lobovision was redesigned with a new layout and look.

=== Roku ===
In October 2012, Cinema Insomnia debuted on the new Roku horror channel Zom-Bee TV. Zom-Bee TV aired the first HD Cinema Insomnia episode with the 2009 film Maxwell Stein.

=== OSI 74 ===
Episodes of Cinema Insomnia now air on OSI 74, an online TV channel run by Outer Space International, Mr. Lobo's distribution network featuring "unusual, experimental, and entertaining programs from many different creative worlds". OSI 74 launched on October 30, 2015, on Roku. Cinema Insomnia episodes are also available on OSI74.com.

== Slime Line ==
Slime Line DVD cover for the 1975 documentary Bigfoot: Mysterious Monster.

In 2010, Apprehensive Films introduced a new line of Cinema Insomnia DVDs called the Slime Line. The Slime Line DVDs feature brand new audio mixes, new retro film-clips, coming attractions for classic B-movie and new indies. The Slime Line DVDs also contain Slime Points which can be collected and mailed into Apprehensive Films for select prizes. Apprehensive Films has also licensed episodes Dick Tracy Meets Gruesome, Gappa: Monsters From a Prehistoric Planet, In Search of Ancient Astronauts, Super Wheels, and Voyage to the Prehistoric Planet to Amazon Video on Demand.

=== List of Slime Line edition DVDs ===
- Bigfoot: Mysterious Monster
- Carnival of Souls
- Cinema Insomnia Halloween Special
- Creature
- Dick Tracy Meets Gruesome
- Eegah
- First Spaceship on Venus
- Gamera: Super Monster
- Gappa: Monsters From a Prehistoric Planet
- In Search of Ancient Astronauts
- Night of the Living Dead
- Santa Claus Conquers the Martians
- Super Wheels
- Voyage to the Prehistoric Planet
- The Wasp Woman

== Alpha Video ==
In September 2019, Alpha Video announced the first three of ten newly remastered Cinema Insomnia volumes to be released on DVD, September 17, 2019.

Twenty additional volumes have been released as of mid 2021.

=== List of Alpha Video DVDs ===
- Cinema Insomnia: 2014 Haunted House Special
- Bob Wilkins: The Lost Tapes, a new extended release of the 2002 Bob Wilkins Halloween Special
- Eegah!
- Dick Tracy Meets Gruesome
- Monster from a Prehistoric Planet
- Santa Claus Conquers the Martians
- The Screaming Skull
- The Brain That Wouldn't Die
- Horrors of Spider Island
- The Wasp Woman
- A Hard Day's Nightmare
- House on Haunted Hill
- Teenagers from Outer Space: Live!
- Voyage to the Prehistoric Planet
- Mark of the Damned
- Xenia: Priestess of Night
- Midget Zombie Takeover
- Carnival of Souls
- Night of the Living Dead
- Bloodsuckers of the Atomic Swamp
- American Werewolf in the Philippines
- War of the Planets
- War of the Robots

== In popular culture ==
- In the first episode "Beware The Beast from Below" of the 2010 animated series Scooby-Doo! Mystery Incorporated, the unmasked villain Professor Emmanuel Raffalo is inspired by the horror host Mr. Lobo.
