= Bob Wilkins =

American television host

- Bob Wilkins in his iconic rocking chair
- Born: April 11, 1932; Hammond, Indiana
- Died: January 7, 2009 (aged 76); Reno, Nevada
- Years active: 1963–1981
- Known for: Host of Creature Features television show

Bob Wilkins (born Robert Gene Wilkins; April 11, 1932 – January 7, 2009) was a television personality.

Wilkins was the creator and host of the popular television show Creature Features that ran on KTVU in the San Francisco Bay Area from 1971 to 1984.

The programming on Creature Features featured science fiction and horror films, ranging from classics such as Bride of Frankenstein to B-grade obscurities like The Vulture.

Wilkins' wit was very dry; it fit very well with the outrageously awful horror films he hosted. His approach suggested an aficionado's taste for genre cinema. His trade marks were his droll humor, his omnipresent cigar, and sitting in his iconic rocking chair.

== KCRA-3 and KTXL-40 in Sacramento ==
Wilkins started his on-camera television career in 1963 at KCRA-TV Channel 3 in Sacramento, California. He was writing and producing commercials for the station when he was tapped to be a fill-in host for an afternoon movie show in 1964. Wilkins was given his own time slot, hosting horror films on Seven Arts Theater (later advertised as Bob Wilkins Presents and The Bob Wilkins Show), which followed the station's Saturday 11 p.m. newscast. The show debuted on September 10, 1966, with Attack of the Mushroom People being the featured film. After several successful years, he was courted by former KCRA manager Tom Breen, then at KTVU in Oakland, California, to bring his show to the San Francisco Bay Area. Breen was one of Wilkins' best supporters at KCRA, who had always encouraged the then-young host to try novel things, and to never be afraid of going for it. Bob left KCRA on his own terms, with his last show broadcast on March 14, 1970. However, after starting a new show on KTVU, Bob returned to Sacramento television, this time at KTXL Channel 40 on May 9, 1970, with The Bob Wilkins Double Horror Show, an all-new production, which ran successfully for over a decade.

== KTVU-2 in Oakland ==
On Saturday, January 9, 1971, after weeks of attention-grabbing teasers, Creature Features debuted on KTVU Channel 2 at 9:00 p.m. with The Horror of Party Beach, and immediately became a tremendous ratings winner. In response, the show expanded to a double feature format within its first year of broadcast on August 7, 1971. Another benchmark was when Creature Features ran the world television premiere of the already infamous 1968 horror film, Night of the Living Dead, at 9:00 p.m. on January 1, 1972. So popular was Bob Wilkins' Creature Features that it would often beat network programming, such as Saturday Night Live, in the local Nielsen ratings. After six years, KTVU responded to popular demand by adding a single-movie Friday night show at 11:30 p.m., debuting on February 4, 1977. The following week, the Saturday Double Feature returned to a single-movie format starting at 11:30 p.m., and continued in this two-night format through Bob's last Creature Features show on February 24, 1979. Dropping the Friday night show, John Stanley took over the Saturday program at 11:00 p.m. on March 3, 1979.

During the height of his popularity, Wilkins, a soft-spoken, but sharp-witted character from Indiana, was able to produce and host a number of prime time specials, including The Star Trek Dream and The Bob Wilkins Super Horror Show, as well as hosting occasional horror films on KTVU's weeknight 8 O'Clock Movie show, in addition to making dozens of public appearances every year. Even with this seemingly heavy workload, including commuting every week to Sacramento from Oakland to tape his sister show on KTXL-40, he was first and foremost a devoted husband and father, coaching baseball at his son and daughter's school, and rarely staying up past 10 p.m. Eventually, Wilkins found himself, at the urging of KTVU management, joining the 10 O'Clock News team in September 1972 as their weather reporter. After his two-year contract expired, he was eager to step down, as he didn't feel that he could be creative that late at night. In spite of this, he was nominated for a local Emmy Award for a ski report, which used footage from the opening ski chase scene from the 1969 James Bond adventure, On Her Majesty's Secret Service.

== Captain Cosmic on KTVU-2 ==
In 1977, Wilkins launched an afternoon children's program on KTVU, Captain Cosmic, showcasing various sci-fi serials. such as Spectreman, The Space Giants, Ultraman, Johnny Sokko and his Flying Robot, and Star Blazers. Japanese imports were a prime focus, though the show also featured the 1936 Universal Pictures Serial Flash Gordon, Captain Scarlet and the Mysterons, and the occasional movie serialized in five parts (Godzilla vs. the Thing and Dagora, the Space Monster). Donning a face-concealing helmet, Wilkins was uncredited, but fans of his Creature Features program recognized him immediately, while children who were not old enough to stay up late to watch Creature Features had no idea. Captain Cosmic's sidekick on the show was an actual, cable-controlled automaton, named "Wonder Robot 2T2" that emulated R2-D2 in the Star Wars series by uttering bleeps and blips (that only the good Captain could understand).

== Return to advertising and retirement ==
At the height of his popularity, Wilkins decided to retire from television and go back into advertising. On February 24, 1979, after offering the job to several of his researchers, including film historian David Del Valle, he relinquished the Creature Features hosting duties to San Francisco Chronicle film critic John Stanley (1979–1984). Wilkins continued his program on KTXL as The Bob Wilkins Double Horror Show from May 9, 1970, through February 14, 1981.

Although no longer a fixture on television, Wilkins periodically made appearances at comic book and fantasy conventions, film screenings and tributes, until two years before his death. He appeared at the 1976 Star Trek / Science Fiction convention InterCon in Salt Lake City. After his departure from television, Wilkins concentrated on his advertising agency, which handled accounts such as the Chuck E. Cheese restaurant chain. In the 1990s, he and his wife, Sally, retired and moved to Reno, Nevada.

== Death ==
On August 14, 2007, John Stanley, Wilkins' replacement on Creature Features, reported in an interview on the radio program Coast to Coast, that Wilkins had Alzheimer's disease and was then living in Sacramento.

At age 76, Bob Wilkins died on January 7, 2009, from complications of Alzheimer's disease in Reno, Nevada.

== Legacy ==
Wilkins' fans include actor Tom Hanks and Bay Area filmmaker George Lucas, who watched the Sacramento programs as a youth in Modesto.

In 2008, a feature-length documentary on Creature Features, Watch Horror Films, Keep America Strong!, debuted in several theaters in the San Francisco Bay Area. The 75-minute film features interviews with hosts Bob Wilkins and John Stanley, as well as other key figures close to the show, both behind-the-scenes and in front of the cameras. This is interspersed with vintage clips spanning the history of the show, highlighting the creative and experimental era of local broadcasting.
