= Ray Kellogg (director) =

American special effects artist and film director (1905–1976)

Edgar Ray Kellogg
- Born: November 15, 1905; Iowa, U.S.
- Died: July 5, 1976 (aged 70); Ontario, California, U.S.
- Occupations: Special effects artist, film director

Edgar Ray Kellogg (November 15, 1905 – July 5, 1976) was an American special effects artist and film director from Iowa.

== Career ==
During World War II, Kellogg was a US Navy Lieutenant with the O.S.S. Field Photographing Branch where he became acquainted with John Ford.

Following the war Kellogg went to Hollywood working in special effects for 20th Century Fox, eventually heading the unit. He made his debut as a director with The Killer Shrews and The Giant Gila Monster in 1959. Both films would later be parodied in Mystery Science Theater 3000.

He co-directed The Green Berets in 1968 with John Wayne, a controversial war film set during the then conflict in Vietnam that involved the US Army.

He died in Ontario, California of cancer.

== Filmography ==
=== Director ===
- The Killer Shrews (1959)
- The Giant Gila Monster (1959)
- My Dog, Buddy (1960)
- The Green Berets - co-directed with John Wayne and Mervyn LeRoy (1968)

=== Producer ===
- That Justice Be Done (1945)
- The Red Pony (TV) (1973)
