= Chariots of the Gods (film) =

1970 film

- Theatrical release poster
- Directed by: Harald Reinl
- Written by: Harald Reinl; Wilhelm Roggersdorf
- Based on: Chariots of the Gods? by Erich von Däniken
- Produced by: Manfred Barthel; Günther Eulau
- Narrated by: Heinz-Detlev Bock; Klaus Kindler; Christian Marschall
- Cinematography: Ernst Wild
- Edited by: Hermann Haller
- Music by: Peter Thomas
- Distributed by: Terra Film
- Release date: 26 April 1970
- Running time: 92 minutes
- Country: West Germany
- Language: German
- Box office: $25.9 million or $12.46 million

Chariots of the Gods (German: Erinnerungen an die Zukunft, lit. 'memories of the future') is a 1970 West German documentary film directed by Harald Reinl. It is based on Erich von Däniken's book Chariots of the Gods?, a pseudoscientific book that theorizes extraterrestrials impacted early human life and evolution. The film was nominated for an Academy Award for Best Documentary Feature.

== Synopsis ==
The film begins by introducing the cargo cults established by South Pacific Natives after coming in contact with American planes in World War II. It claims that it is likely that all religions began in a similar fashion. The viewer is then presented with various ancient texts, architecture, and artwork. Some of these include the Bible, the Pyramids, the Epic of Gilgamesh, and the Nazca Lines.

== Release ==
The film was re-edited and dubbed into English by Sunn Classic Pictures for release in the United States in 1973.

== Reception ==
The U.S. release of Chariots of Gods grossed $25,948,300. Film critic Phil Hall said "They don't make films like this any more, and we should be glad for that." The film was criticized for a lack of scientific evidence. Anthropologist Robert Ardrey called it science fiction.

== Soundtrack charts ==
Chart (1972)	Position
Australia (Kent Music Report)	28
