= List of Katharine Ross performances =

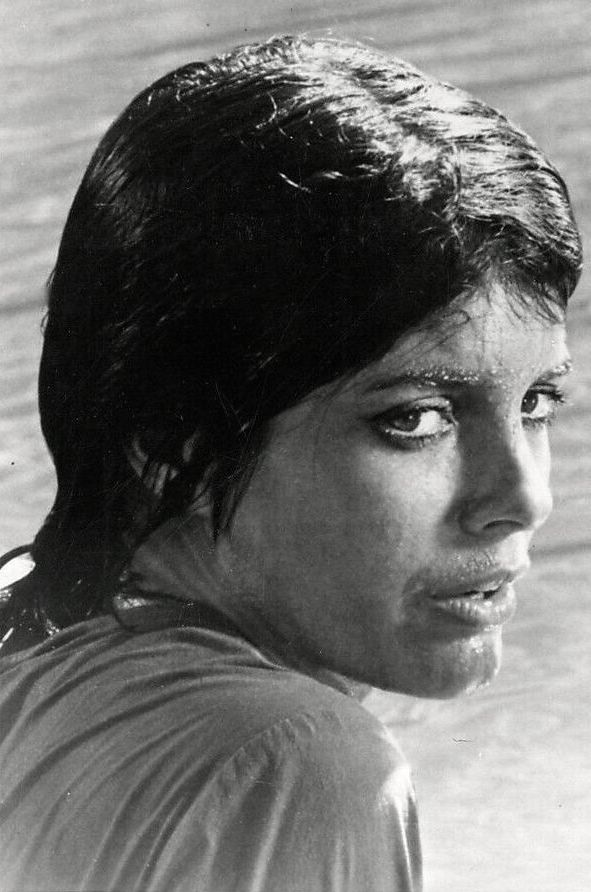
Ross in Tell Them Willie Boy Is Here (1969)

Katharine Ross is an American actress whose career began in the 1960s, with her feature debut being Shenandoah (1965), followed by roles in the comedies Mister Buddwing (1965) and The Singing Nun (1966), and the psychological thriller Games (1967). Ross garnered international acclaim for her role in Mike Nichols' The Graduate (1967), for which she won the Golden Globe Award for New Star of the Year, and was nominated for the Academy Award and BAFTA Award for Best Supporting Actress.

In 1969, Ross won the BAFTA Award for Best Actress for her roles in both Butch Cassidy and the Sundance Kid and Tell Them Willie Boy Is Here. Subsequent roles included the lead in the horror film The Stepford Wives (1975), and the drama Voyage of the Damned (1976), for which she won the Golden Globe Award for Best Supporting Actress. She then co-starred with Sam Elliott—who subsequently became her husband—in the horror film The Legacy (1978), followed by the science fiction film The Final Countdown (1980) and in Richard Brooks' comedy thriller Wrong Is Right (1982). From 1985 to 1987, Ross starred in the television series The Colbys. Beginning in the 1990s, Ross went into semi-retirement, though she continued to occasionally appear in television and film roles. In 2001, she had a supporting role as a therapist of the title character in Richard Kelly's Donnie Darko, which went on to amass a cult following.

== Film ==
Year	Title	Role	Director	Notes	Ref.
1965	Shenandoah	Ann Anderson	Andrew V. McLaglen		
1965	Mister Buddwing	Janet	Delbert Mann		
1966	The Singing Nun	Nicole Arlien	Henry Koster		
1967	The Longest Hundred Miles	Laura Huntington	Don Weis	Television film	
1967	Games	Jennifer Montgomery	Curtis Harrington		
1967	The Graduate	Elaine Robinson	Mike Nichols	Golden Globe-Best New Starring Actress. Laurel Award-Best Supporting Actress. Nominated Academy Award for Best Supporting Actress and BAFTA-Best Newcomer	
1968	Hellfighters	Tish Buckman	Andrew V. McLaglen		
1969	Butch Cassidy and the Sundance Kid	Etta Place	George Roy Hill	BAFTA Award for Best Actress (also for Tell Them Willie Boy Is Here)	
1969	Tell Them Willie Boy Is Here	Lola	Abraham Polonsky	BAFTA Award for Best Actress (also for Butch Cassidy and the Sundance Kid)	
1970	Fools	Anais Appleton	Tom Gries		
1972	Get to Know Your Rabbit	Nameless Woman	Brian De Palma		
1972	They Only Kill Their Masters	Kate Bingham	James Goldstone		
1974	Love and Chance	Docteur Constance Weber	Philippe Labro	Also known as: Chance and Violence	
1975	The Stepford Wives	Joanna Eberhart	Bryan Forbes	Saturn Award for Best Actress	
1976	Voyage of the Damned	Mira Houser	Stuart Rosenberg	Golden Globe Award for Best Supporting Actress – Motion Picture	
1976	Wanted: The Sundance Woman	Etta Place / Mrs. Sundance / Annie Martin / Bonnie Doris	Lee Philips	Television film	
1978	The Betsy	Sally Hardeman	Daniel Petrie		
1978	The Swarm	Helena Anderson	Irwin Allen		
1978	The Legacy	Margaret Walsh	Richard Marquand		
1979	Murder by Natural Causes	Allison Sinclair	Robert Day	Television film	
1980	The Final Countdown	Laurel Scott	Don Taylor		
1980	Rodeo Girl	Sammy Garrett	Jackie Cooper	Television film	
1981	Murder in Texas	Ann Kurth Hill	William Hale	Television film	
1982	Wait Until Dark	Suzy Hendrix	Barry Davis	Television film	
1982	Marian Rose White	Nurse Bonnie MacNeil	Robert Day	Television film	
1982	The Shadow Riders	Kate Connery/Sister Katherine	Andrew V. McLaglen	Television film	
1982	Wrong Is Right	Sally Blake	Richard Brooks		
1983	Travis McGee	Gretel Howard	Andrew V. McLaglen	Television film	
1983	Secrets of a Mother and Daughter	Ava Price	Gabrielle Beaumont	Television film	
1986	Red Headed Stranger	Laurie	William D. Wittliff		
1991	A Climate for Killing	Grace Hines	J. S. Cardone		
1997	Home Before Dark	Rose	Maureen Foley	Television film	
2001	Donnie Darko	Dr. Lilian Thurman	Richard Kelly		
2002	Don't Let Go	Charlene Stevens	Max Myers		
2006	Eye of the Dolphin	Lucy	Michael D. Sellers		
2013	Wini + George	Wini	Benjamin Monie	Short film	
2015	Slip, Tumble & Slide	Charlene Stevens	Max Myers		
2017	The Hero	Valerie Hayden	Brett Haley		
2019	Attachments	Eileen	Richard Krevolin		

== Television ==
Year	Title	Role	Notes	Ref.
1962	Sam Benedict	Teresa Parelli	Season 1 Episode 2: "A Split Week in San Quentin"	
1963	Kraft Suspense Theatre	Janet Bollington	Season 1 Episode 5: "Are There Any More Out There Like You?"	
1963	The Lieutenant	Elizabeth	Season 1 Episode 11: "Fall from a White Horse"	
1963	The Alfred Hitchcock Hour	Carol Brandt	Season 2 Episode 9: "The Dividing Wall"	
1964	Arrest and Trial	Marietta Valera	Season 1 Episode 16: "Signals of an Ancient Flame"	
1964	Ben Casey	Marie Costeau	Season 3 Episode 33: "The Evidence of Things Not Seen"	
1964	The Virginian	Jenny Hendricks	Season 3 Episode 2: "The Dark Challenge"	
1964	Gunsmoke	Susan Liz Beaumont	Season 10 Episode 2: "Crooked Mile" Season 10 Episode 27: "The Lady"	
1965	Mr. Novak	Mrs. Bellway	Season 2 Episode 19: "Faculty Follies: Part 2"	
1965	Wagon Train	Bonnie Brooke	Season 8 Episode 19: "The Bonnie Brooke Story"	
1965	Bob Hope Presents the Chrysler Theatre	Gloria	Season 2 Episode 16: "Terror Island"	
1965	Run for Your Life	Laura Beaumont	Season 1 Episode 1: "The Cold, Cold War of Paul Bryan"	
1965	The Big Valley	Maria Montero	Season 1 Episode 7: "Winner Lose All"	
1965	The Loner	Sue Sullivan	Season 1 Episode 7: "Widow on the Evening Stage"	
1965	The Wild Wild West	Sheila Parnell	Season 1 Episode 9: "The Night of the Double-Edged Knife"	
1966	Preview Tonight	Asenath	Season 1 Episode 5: "Great Bible Adventures: Seven Rich Years and Seven Lean"	
1966	The Road West	Rachel Adams	Season 1 Episode 11: "To Light a Candle"	
1976	Origins of the Mafia	Rosa Mastrangelo	Mini-series	
1985–1987	The Colbys	Francesca 'Frankie' Scott Colby Hamilton Langdon	49 episodes	
1986	Gone To Texas aka Houston: The Legend of Texas	Susannah Dickinson	Television film	
1988	ABC Afterschool Specials	Maggie's Mother	Season 17 Episode 3: "Tattle: When to Tell on a Friend"	
1991	Conagher	Evie Teale	Television film	
2004	Capital City	N/A	Unaired pilot	
2016	Family Guy	Mrs. West	Season 14 Episode 16: "The Heartbreak Dog"	
2016	American Dad!	Angela, Sickly Lady (voices)	Season 11 Episode 6: "Kiss Kiss Cam Cam" Season 12 Episode 4: "Portrait of Francine's Genitals"	

== Stage ==
Year	Title	Role	Notes	Ref.
1962	The Devil's Disciple	Beatrice Cameron	The Actors Workshop, San Francisco, California	
1964	King Lear	Cordelia	University of California, Los Angeles	
2015–2017	Love Letters	Melissa Gardner	Malibu Playhouse, Malibu, California; Electric Theatre, St. George, Utah	

== Sources ==
- Andreychuk, Ed (1997). The Golden Corral: A Roundup of Magnificent Western Films. Jefferson, North Carolina: McFarland. ISBN 0-7864-0393-4.
- Monaco, James (1991). The Encyclopedia of Film. Perigree Books. ISBN 978-0-399-51604-7.
