= How Awful About Allan =

- Title card
- Genre: Thriller
- Based on: How Awful About Allan by Henry Farrell
- Written by: Henry Farrell
- Directed by: Curtis Harrington
- Starring: Anthony Perkins; Julie Harris; Joan Hackett
- Music by: Laurence Rosenthal
- Country of origin: United States
- Original language: English

Production
- Executive producer: Aaron Spelling
- Producer: George Edwards
- Cinematography: Fleet Southcott
- Editor: Richard Farrell
- Running time: 73 minutes
- Production company: Aaron Spelling Productions

Original release
- Network: ABC
- Release: September 22, 1970

How Awful About Allan is a 1970 American made-for-television horror psychological thriller film directed by Curtis Harrington, the first of two collaborations with writer Henry Farrell (the other was What's the Matter with Helen?), and starring Anthony Perkins (in his television film debut) and Julie Harris. It premiered as the ABC Movie of the Week on September 22, 1970, and was produced by prolific television producer Aaron Spelling.

== Plot ==
Allan Colleigh has psychosomatic blindness following a fire that killed his father, a renowned academic who punished Allan as a child. The fire also facially scarred Allan's sister Katherine. Allan had accidentally left some cans of paint thinner near a heater which caught fire.

Returning home partially cured after months in a mental hospital, Allan tries to adjust to his life back at home. Katherine has an ex-boyfriend who has gone away, but who phones the house after Allan's return. She also takes in an odd boarder who she says has a throat injury and hence can only speak in a whisper. Allan is suspicious and afraid of the new boarder and when he begins to hear his name being whispered and partially sees a dark figure coming to get him, wonders whether he is crazy or whether someone is really out to get him. He records his suspicions on a reel-to-reel tape recorder in his bedroom.

Olive, Allan's fiancée before his father died in the fire, tries to renew contact with Allan. He is, at first, reluctant but gradually is persuaded to see her again. He asks her to keep an eye out for the mysterious lodger so she can describe the lodger to him. Olive persuades him to take a trip into town in her car. While she drops books back at the university library, she leaves Allan alone in the car and he thinks he hears the whispering again. He tries to drive the car away, only to crash it.

After further incidents with the blurry, whispering figure – and Allan cutting himself with a knife upon being startled by a delivery boy at the kitchen window – Katherine tries to persuade him to see the psychiatrist again. Meanwhile, Olive claims to have seen Katherine's boyfriend in the town. Katherine denies that he has returned, but Allan feels she is hiding something and suspects she wants to have him sent back to the hospital. Allan experiences various nightmares. In one he relives his punishment by his father, during which he hid in a dark cupboard. In another episode, the whispering voice lures him to a room which seems burnt and where the ceiling timbers fall in. The next morning, he is convinced that the room was real. This belief is reinforced by his finding a piece of burnt wood in the house.

Allan calls the hospital, hoping to see the psychiatrist. Unfortunately, the doctor is away. Allan will have to take a cab to meet the doctor on his return. The cab duly arrives, but in going to meet it, Allan slips on the path. The cab driver turns out to be Eric, Katherine's boyfriend, who has a croaky whispering voice which he attributes to a cold. Olive, who has come looking for him, helps Allan back into the house. Later, after ensuring Allan is still alive although his door is locked, Olive and Katherine speak together and Katherine says she will send Allan back to the hospital the next morning, as she cannot stand it any more. Allan had tried to convince Olive there was a plot against him, remembering that the whispering voice was on his tape recorder from the night before, but she is no longer in the room when the voice plays back. Allan smashes the tape recorder on the floor.

Soon after, the whispering voice lures Allan into the kitchen pantry and the door is locked behind him. He finds that a fire has been set within, but douses it with some flour and manages to break the door down and wrestle with the shadowy attacker. As he pulls the figure's black mask off, his vision returns and he recognizes his sister, Katherine. He also removes the plastic "appliance", which she had adhered to her face to represent her scar. She confesses that she had the scar from the fire removed, but says that it should have remained there as a brand to show all the world Allan's crime: the "murder" of their father, "the greatest man who ever lived."

After some time has passed, Allan comes home and talks to Olive, who is preparing dinner for them. He has been taking a music appreciation course and seems much more normal. However, he has received a letter from Katherine – who was evidently sent to a psychiatric facility – pleading with him to have her released. As he contemplates this, his vision goes dark – he is blind again.

== Cast ==
- Anthony Perkins as Allan Colleigh
- Julie Harris as Katherine Colleigh
- Joan Hackett as Olive
- Kent Smith as Raymond Colleigh
- Robert H. Harris as Dr. Ellins
- Molly Dodd as the Inmate
- Billy Bowles as Harold Dennis
- Trent Dolan as Eric
- Bill Erwin as Dr. Ames
- Jeannette Howe as Katherine (child)
- Kenneth Lawrence as Allan (child)

== Production ==
The original novel was published in 1963. The Washington Post called it "one of the most impressive novels of the year." Anthony Perkins signed to make the film in April 1970. The movie was shot in 12 days. Perkins had special contact lenses made that he could barely see through, so he would be nearly blind while filming his scenes. He popped the lenses in just before filming and was led onto the set by a crew member.

== Reception ==
The Los Angeles Times called it "not scary". The New York Times critic opined that it "had neither a thrill nor a chill."
