= Samson De Brier =

American actor (1909–1995)

Samson De Brier (March 18, 1909 – April 1, 1995) was an actor best known for hosting a popular Hollywood salon during the 1950s and 1960s, and for appearing in Kenneth Anger's 1954 underground film Inauguration of the Pleasure Dome.

== Biography ==
Spencer Kansa relates that De Brier was

a flamboyant aesthete often rumoured to be the bastard son of the King of Romania. Whatever the truth of that, De Brier's exotic story began in China where he was born in 1909. Still a child when his family relocated to the States, De Brier grew up in Atlantic City where, so the story goes, his father, a corrupt politician, was stabbed to death by a jealous woman. By his teens he had cultivated the Wildean pose of an elegantly attired dandy. A role he at first adopted, then became totally. To escape the tragedy and scandal, the family moved to Los Angeles where legend has it De Brier enjoyed the briefest of movie careers, understudying the actor Arthur Jasmine as the page of Herodias in Alla Nazimova's scandalous film version of Oscar Wilde's Salomé.

When a Hollywood career failed to pan out, De Brier took his sartorial self on a steamer to Paris, a bejeweled 16-year-old draped in a fur coat. In the Paris of the 1920s, he fraternized with ex-pat literati including Hemingway, Joyce, Gertrude Stein and Henry Miller. He became a lover of André Gide (though this claim has not been substantiated), and was allegedly the model for Picasso's Pierrot series of paintings.

On his American return, he hosted the Gangplank radio show for WMCA in New York, where he interviewed some of the biggest celebrities of the day including Noël Coward, Sonja Henie and Thomas Mann traveling en route to America. After the war he returned to Los Angeles, where he worked the night shift at Lockheed, and had a stint as a male nurse on the psych ward at the Veterans Hospital. He bought a Victorian duplex on Barton Avenue in West Hollywood that included adjoining properties which he rented out, affording himself the freedom to live as a fulltime aesthete and professional putterer. De Brier's home reflected his fondness for Art Nouveau decor, and velvet drapes, silken oriental robes, Tiffany lamps and ornate objets d'art dominating. A collector of rare Hollywood memorabilia, he salvaged costumes and props purloined from long-forgotten silent classics, and with the house kept in a permanent gothic gloom, it became something of a dark museum.

In the 1940s, De Brier left Atlantic City for Los Angeles, and during the Second World War, he worked in a defense plant, sinking his wages into real estate. The rental income from his properties enabled him to stop working and pursue a new career - artistic social butterfly, taking tea and exploring avant-garde scenes."

According to Bill Landis, in 1948, Kenneth Anger "discovered a house in the Hollywood Hills that was perfect for the exteriors in Puce Moment. The interiors were shot at the home of Samson De Brier, who became a lifelong friend of Anger's. De Brier was a slender, fey, continental type. His old-fashioned air led people to believe that he was much more advanced in years than he was. De Brier had been part of the Atlantic City homosexual milieu depicted in the 1933 novel The Young and the Evil by Charles Henri Ford and Parker Tyler.

In the fifties, de Brier began hosting a regular salon at his Barton Avenue home. It flourished for many years and was frequented by artists, writers, actors, filmmakers, and occultists. Visitors were attracted by De Brier's alleged knowledge of the occult, his store of Hollywood lore, and his collections of movie memorabilia and objets d'art. Among those who attended De Brier's salon were author Anaïs Nin, filmmakers Kenneth Anger and Curtis Harrington, actors Jack Nicholson and Dennis Hopper, and occultists Jack Parsons, Marjorie Cameron and Anton LaVey.

In 1954 De Brier played several roles, including the principal role, in Anger's Inauguration of the Pleasure Dome, which was filmed at his home. Harrington, Nin, and Cameron also appeared in the film.

De Brier provided a refuge for Kenneth Anger in the late eighties. In 1987, Kenneth Anger "moved into a small caretaker's house on the grounds of Samson De Brier's home in a Mexican section of Los Angeles. Soon the memorabilia and blood-red decor were once again in place."

In 1989, the elderly De Brier, with his friend Wendy Hyland, attended an exhibition of Marjorie Cameron's works entitled The Pearl of Reprisal held at Los Angeles Municipal Art Gallery at Barnsdall Art Park, at which Cameron also read her poetry. Spencer Kansa relates that "When the PA kept cutting out, making Cameron inaudible, De Brier began complaining, so vociferously that the director of the gallery exclaimed get that old hairdresser out of here!".

De Brier died on April Fools' Day 1995 at Hollywood Presbyterian Hospital. Spencer Kansa relates that according to his old friend Wendy Hyland, De Brier had become a curmudgeon in his old age, prone to bouts of embarrassing behavior, making scenes in restaurants and with a phobia about apples. He lived his last years like a hermit, doing his best to keep ugly reality outside the haven of his own home. A memorial for him was held at the art centre Beyond Baroque in Venice. Photographs from De Brier's house were exhibited upstairs and a print of Inauguration of the Pleasure Dome and Salomé were played for the attendees.

De Brier's papers are housed at the ONE National Gay & Lesbian Archives at the University of Southern California Libraries.
