= Molly Dodd =

American actress

- Molly Dodd in The Andy Griffith Show, 1963
- Born: Mary Elise Dodd; November 11, 1921; Los Angeles, California, U.S.
- Died: March 26, 1981 (aged 59); Santa Monica, California, U.S.
- Occupation: Actress
- Spouse: Henry Farrell (m. 1920)

Molly Dodd (November 11, 1921 — March 26, 1981) was an American actress.

== Biography ==
Dodd began her career on the Los Angeles stage in 1939, debuting in a revival of the play The Cradle Song with the Westwood Theatre Guild. She then appeared in The Penguin (1940), at the Call Board Theatre in Hollywood.

In February 1947, Dodd received a citation from the USO for her performance in Noël Coward's Private Lives at United States Army camps. She acted in numerous stage productions through the years, including summer stock in La Jolla.

Dodd was in only four theatrical movies. She first appeared as a beautician in Hitchcock's Vertigo (1958) starring James Stewart and Kim Novak. She also appeared as Mrs. Rigg in What's the Matter with Helen? (1971), which was written by her husband, writer Henry Farrell, and starred Debbie Reynolds and Shelley Winters. In 1965, Dodd and actor/writer Robert Lansing formed the State Repertory Theatre as a rallying ground for professional actors who wanted to do plays outside the realm of commercial theatre. They did various productions – Spoon River Anthology, a concert titled From Our Bag, Pirandello's As You Desire Me, and a double-bill titled Those Mad Victorians, which the company took to Caltech in the late 1960s. When they returned to Caltech the following season, they performed An Evening With Oscar Wilde, a concert reading based on Wilde's The Picture of Dorian Gray and The House of Pomegranates, with Dodd as one of the players.

She made a number of guest appearances on various top-rated TV shows, including The Rifleman, The Andy Griffith Show, The Twilight Zone, Gomer Pyle, Hazel, Petticoat Junction, The Brady Bunch, Bewitched and The Rockford Files. Dodd also played a mental patient in the TV movie How Awful About Allan (1970), which was written by her husband, and starred Anthony Perkins and Julie Harris.

== Death ==
Dodd died at the age of 59 in Santa Monica from undisclosed causes and was interred at the Hollywood Forever Cemetery.

== Filmography ==
Films
| Year | Title | Role | Notes |
|---|---|---|---|
| 1958 | Vertigo | Beautician | Uncredited |
| 1963 | My Six Loves | Woman | Uncredited |
| 1971 | What's the Matter with Helen? | Mrs. Rigg | |
| 1978 | Harper Valley PTA | Olive Glover | |

TV Series
| Year | Title | Role | Notes |
|---|---|---|---|
| 1954 | Man Against Crime | Woman | 1 episode, credited as Bea Chilton |
| 1958 | Bachelor Father | Woman at Laundromat | 1 episode |
| 1958 | Playhouse 90 | Reporter with Capone | 1 episode |
| 1959 | M Squad | Police Sgt. Connally | 1 episode |
| 1960 | The DuPont Show with June Allyson | May | 1 episode |
| 1960 | The Rifleman | Bessie Steel-Weaver | 1 episode |
| 1960 | Peter Loves Mary | Singing Teacher | 1 episode |
| 1961 | The Tom Ewell Show | Vancouver Passenger | 1 episode |
| 1961 | Margie | Mrs. March | 1 episode |
| 1962 | The Detectives | Monica | 1 episode |
| 1963 | The Twilight Zone | May | Season 4 Episode 12, "I Dream of Genie" |
| 1970 | How Awful About Allan | Unidentified patient | TV Movie |
| 1974 | The Whiz Kid and the Mystery at Riverton | Mrs. Blake | TV Movie |
