= Irish Jam =

- Promotional poster
- Directed by: John Eyres
- Written by: John Eyres; Max Myers
- Produced by: Phillipe Martinez; Alan Latham; Thomas Mattinson
- Starring: Eddie Griffin; Anna Friel; Kevin R. McNally
- Cinematography: Nimrod Getter
- Music by: Guy Farley
- Production companies: Bauer Martinez Studios; Defender Film Fund II; Lucky 7 Productions
- Distributed by: Sony Pictures Home Entertainment (United Kingdom)
- Release date: March 14, 2006
- Running time: 94 minutes
- Countries: United States; United Kingdom
- Language: English

Irish Jam is a 2006 American-British comedy-drama film directed by John Eyres, who co-wrote the script with Max Myers. It stars Eddie Griffin as an African American hustler who wins an Irish public house in a raffle and has to save the village from the clutches of an evil English landlord. Despite the majority of the film being set in Ireland, it was filmed in Scotland, and the Irish characters were all portrayed by English actors.

The film received extremely negative reviews from critics.

== Plot ==
In Ireland, the indebted village of Ballywood is mostly owned by greedy real estate mogul Lord Hailstock, who inherited most of the town's land. Hailstock, an English Protestant, is bigoted against the village's Irish Catholics, and gloats that he will soon own every building there after he purchases Finnigan's Pub, which he has foreclosed on. The villagers, mostly employed by Hailstock and determined to stave off the foreclosure, plan to raise money by sponsoring an international poetry contest, with each entry costing $5 and the winner receiving the deed to the pub.

In South Central Los Angeles, James "Jimmy Da Jam" McDevitt is a wisecracking African-American hustler unable to pay his debts. Jimmy ekes out a living by street grifting and break-dancing. After he is evicted from his apartment and attacked by his violent ex-fiancée, whom he recently left at the altar, Jimmy hears about the contest in the newspaper and decides to enter. Despite plagiarizing a rap song for his poem, Jimmy is selected as the winner by Kathleen Duffy, the mute daughter of Maureen, the pub's folk singer.

The plan is a success and raises over $1 million. Although the money raised is just shy of paying off the debt, it does allow Jimmy to accept ownership of the pub to keep it out of Hailstock's hands. The villagers are excited to meet Jimmy, but are surprised by his appearance since his surname led them to expect a white Irish man. Although the villagers are initially skeptical, Jimmy's ideas that were considered absurd in California are seen as fresh in Ballywood, and the residents quickly warm up to him. Maureen realizes that Jimmy has a good heart, and Kathleen views him as a father figure.

All the locals like Jimmy except Milus O'Shea, who secretly works for Hailstock to undermine the plan so Hailstock can buy the town. Hailstock plans to demolish the village and build an offensive and ridiculous theme park called "Leprechaun Land", based on Irish ethnic stereotypes. Milus attempts to convince the villagers to boycott the pub on the basis of Jimmy's race until Maureen's father, Pat Duffy, points out the similarities between the histories of the Irish and forcibly relocated Africans in the United States. Frustrated by the futility of his plans, Milus attacks Jimmy one night in hopes of driving him away.

Jimmy bonds with Maureen and Kathleen, which frustrates Michael O'Malley, who wants to marry the former. Jimmy tells Michael that they are just friends and encourages him to continue to pursue her, but Maureen slowly falls for Jimmy. Jimmy learns that Kathleen has been mute since her father died in a car accident. Hailstock reaches out to Jimmy, who agrees to make a deal regarding the pub.

Soon after, two Japanese investors, Mr. Suzuki and Mr. Yamamoto, contact Hailstock and tell him that they will gladly front the money for the amusement park. Hailstock reveals to his Irish indentured servant, Mr. Pettikreep, that the theme park is an elaborate scam, as the village is built on bog land and unsuitable for any major construction. Hailstock intends to scam millions from the Japanese investors and flee the country. Milus announces to the entire village that Jimmy stole the poem, to no effect. He then reveals that Jimmy was preparing to sell the pub to Hailstock, prompting Maureen to leave in tears.

The next day, Hailstock discovers his bank account is emptied, as "Mr. Suzuki" and "Mr. Yamamoto" are actually Jimmy's Asian American friends from Los Angeles, Diamond Jack and Freddie, while Pettikreep secretly told Jimmy of Hailstock's plans. Because they have the copy of the surveyor's report, which would send him to prison for fraud, Jimmy blackmails Hailstock into returning the town to the villagers and leaving the country. Disgusted, Milus quits and returns to the village.

Maureen goes to stop Jimmy from leaving on the boat after receiving Michael's blessing. Jimmy tells Maureen that he does not belong in Ballywood. All the villagers, including Milus, try to convince him to stay; he changes his mind after hearing Kathleen speak for the first time. Jimmy and Maureen later marry; however, his ex-fiancée arrives and crashes the wedding.

== Cast ==
- Eddie Griffin as James "Jimmy Da Jam" McDevitt
- Anna Friel as Maureen Duffy
- Kevin R. McNally as Lord Hailstock
- Tom Georgeson as Father James Duffy: Maureen's uncle, Pat's brother, and Ballywood's religious leader
- Dudley Sutton as Pat Duffy: Maureen's father
- Tallulah Pitt-Brown as Kathleen Duffy: Maureen's daughter
- Tony Maudsley as Brian McNulty
- Roger Ashton-Griffiths as Tom Flannery
- Marion O'Dwyer as Donna
- Vass Anderson as Mr. Pettikreep: Hailstock's indentured servant
- Petey Pablo as Jimmy's street pot customer
- Mo'Nique as "Psycho": Jimmy's ex-fiancée
- Angus Barnett as Milus O'Shea
- James Bradshaw as Malachy McNulty: Brian's brother
- Ray Callaghan as Doc Murphy: Ballywood's resident physician
- Christopher Dunne as Michael O'Malley
- Nevin Finegan as Sean McNulty: Brian and Malachy's brother
- Togo Igawa as Diamond Jack/"Mr. Suzuki"
- Frankie Keung as Freddie/"Mr. Yamamoto"
- Cathy Murphy as Dora
