= Puce Moment =

1949 short film by Kenneth Anger

- Title card
- Directed by: Kenneth Anger
- Starring: Yvonne Marquis
- Cinematography: Curtis Harrington
- Music by: Jonathan Halper
- Release date: 1949
- Running time: 6 minutes
- Country: United States

Puce Moment is a 1949 6-minute short film by Kenneth Anger.

== Summary ==
The film opens with a camera watching 1920s-style flapper gowns being taken off a dress rack. The dresses are removed and danced off the rack to psychedelic music. A long-lashed woman, played by Yvonne Marquis, dresses in a dark teal gown and walks to her vanity to apply perfume. She lies on a chaise longue which then begins to move around the room and eventually out to a patio. Borzois appear and she prepares to take them for a walk.

== Cast ==
The only actor in the film is Yvonne Marquis, who was Anger's cousin. This was her last film, and shortly after the film was made she moved to Mexico.

== Production ==
Filmed in 1949, Puce Moment resulted from the unfinished short film Puce Women. The original soundtrack was Verdi opera music; in 1970, Anger re-released the film with a new psychedelic folk-rock soundtrack performed by Jonathan Halper.

The gowns used were owned by Anger's grandmother, who had been a costume designer in the silent film era. The interior shots were filmed in the house of Samson De Brier, who later appeared in Anger's Inauguration of the Pleasure Dome (1954). The exterior shots of the patio were filmed at the house of Max Rapp, who was an orchestra contractor at Universal Pictures. The house had been built by Wallace Beery in 1924 and was one of the first Hollywood Mansions in the Hollywood Dell.

Anger attempts to recreate silent era style by using alternating camera speeds. Curtis Harrington was a cinematographer on the film.

The sequence where Marquis travels by chaise longue was inspired by paintings of Florine Stettheimer.

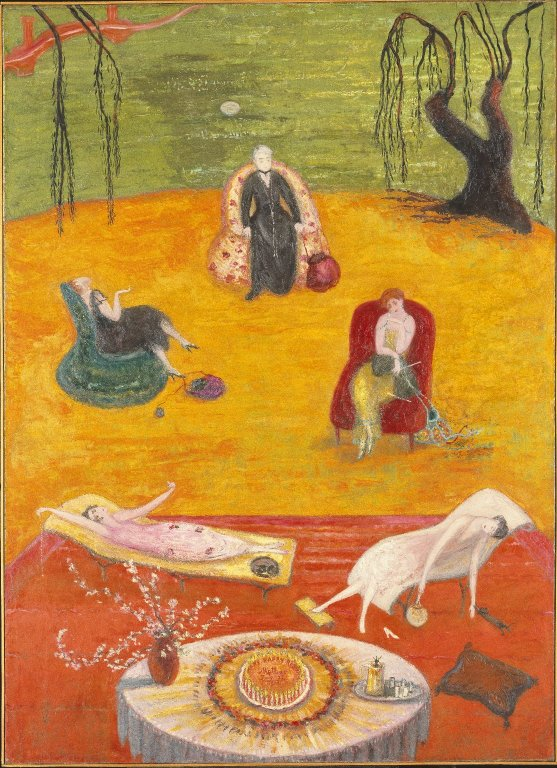
Heat, c. 1919, by Florine Stettheimer, oil on canvas. This is an example of the kind of painting that inspired the chaise longue scene.
