= Games (film) =

1967 film by Curtis Harrington

- Directed by: Curtis Harrington
- Screenplay by: Gene R. Kearney
- Story by: Curtis Harrington; George Edwards
- Produced by: George Edwards
- Starring: Simone Signoret; James Caan; Katherine Ross; Don Stroud
- Cinematography: William A. Fraker
- Edited by: Douglas Stewart
- Music by: Samuel Matlovsky
- Color process: Technicolor
- Production company: Universal Pictures
- Distributed by: Universal Pictures
- Release date: September 17, 1967
- Running time: 100 minutes
- Country: United States
- Language: English
- Budget: $1 million

Games is a 1967 American psychological horror-thriller film written and directed by Curtis Harrington, and starring Simone Signoret, James Caan, and Katharine Ross. Its plot follows two jaded Manhattan socialites (Caan and Ross) who engage in a series of mind games with a German cosmetics agent (Signoret) whom they invite into their home.

The film was released by Universal Pictures on September 17, 1967. It received mixed reviews from critics, although the performances were generally praised. Signoret was nominated for a BAFTA Award for Best Actress in a Supporting Role at the 22nd British Academy Film Awards.

== Plot ==
Businessman Paul Montgomery and his heiress wife Jennifer are two wealthy, but blasé, Upper East Side New York socialites who amuse themselves in a bizarre, chic, and upscale fashion. They frequently host parlor tricks and other social games for their peers at their spacious townhouse, occasionally revealing what appears to be a playfully sadistic streak.

Lisa Schindler, an older German woman, arrives at their door one day selling cosmetics. After she nearly faints and falls ill, Jennifer agrees to let her spend the night. The couple takes a liking to Lisa, who professes to have psychic abilities, and Jennifer asks her to arrange some "games" for their amusement. Lisa proceeds to set up several situations of simulated domestic discord that the couple can react to, among them being a staged affair between Jennifer and the grocery deliveryman, Norman. Paul is initially enraged upon finding Norman in the couple's bedroom, but is bemused when Lisa appears, revealing it to be a phony setup.

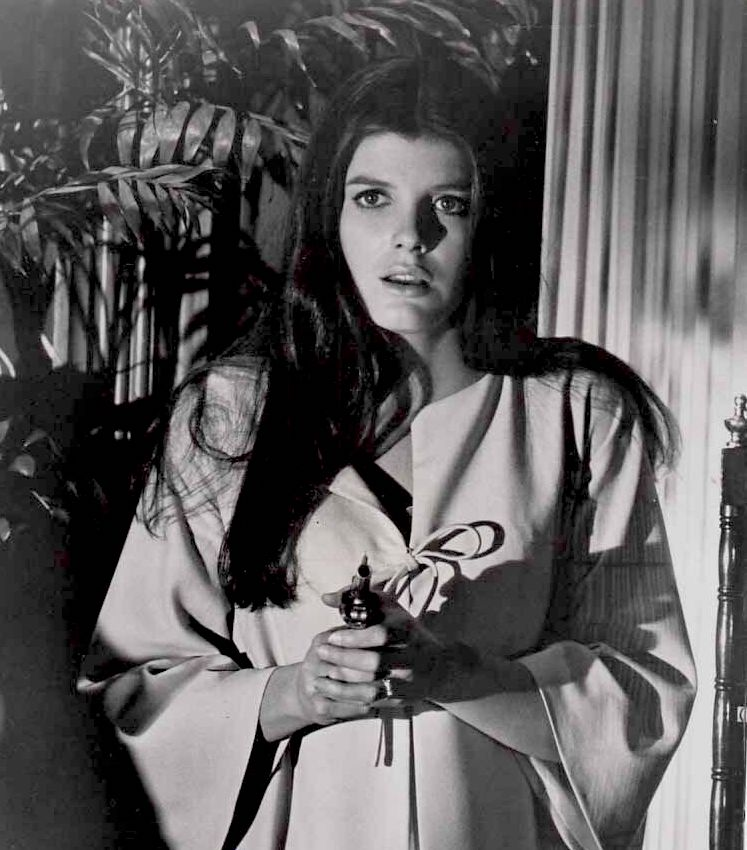
Ross as Jennifer in the finale of Games

When Norman delivers groceries the next day, Paul witnesses him make a romantic advance toward Jennifer. Paul threatens him with a revolver, and fires the gun at him, but it discharges blanks. Paul and Jennifer begin to laugh, revealing to Norman they are only joking. Paul playfully fires the gun again, but this time it shoots Norman in the head, killing him. In a panic, Paul stores Norman's bloodied corpse in a small elevator in the home, and Jennifer sends Lisa to the drugstore to purchase a salve to divert her.

That night, Jennifer drugs Lisa with a sedative so Paul can decide how to dispose of Norman's body. He ultimately chooses to encase it in plaster, posing it as a new statue in the couple's collection. In the morning, Lisa does a tarot reading for Jennifer, drawing the Death card, which upsets her. Late in the night, Lisa approaches Jennifer, confiding in her that she senses a ghost in the house. In the parlor, Jennifer is horrified to see an apparition of Norman with a bullet through his eye.

Lisa departs in the morning after a confrontation with Paul, and Paul heads to Maine on a business trip, leaving Jennifer alone. While watching television, Jennifer hears noises in the house, and the electricity goes out. In the kitchen, she sees the figure of a man approaching, resembling Norman. She swiftly enters the elevator and ascends upstairs, where she attempts to use the telephone, but finds it disabled. Norman enters the room and approaches Jennifer, his eye bloodied, and she fearfully shoots him several times, killing him. Paul enters the room moments later, and removes a prosthetic piece from Norman's eye. Paul calmly phones the police, reporting that his wife has committed a murder. Jennifer realizes she has been set up by Paul and manipulated into killing someone so he can inherit her fortune; Norman, who agreed to participate, was an unwitting casualty.

After Jennifer's arrest, Paul and Lisa share a celebratory drink as Paul gives her a ten-percent cut of Jennifer's fortune. As they have their drinks, Paul soon begins to feel ill. Realizing Lisa has poisoned his drink, he collapses moments later and dies. Lisa leaves the townhouse with a briefcase full of money.

== Cast ==
- Simone Signoret as Lisa Schindler
- James Caan as Paul Montgomery
- Katharine Ross as Jennifer Montgomery
- Don Stroud as Norman
- Kent Smith as Harry Gordon
- Estelle Winwood as Miss Beattie
- Marjorie Bennett as Nora
- Ian Wolfe as Dr. Edwards
- Anthony Eustrel as Winthrop
- Eloise Hardt as Celia
- George Furth as Terry, Party Guest
- Carmen Phillips as Holly
- Peter Brocco as Count, Party Guest
- Florence Marly as Baroness
- Stuart Nisbet as Detective
- William O'Connell as Party Guest
- Luana Anders as Party Guest

== Production ==
=== Casting ===
Curtis Harrington wrote the role of Lisa with Marlene Dietrich in mind to play the part. The producers vetoed the idea, however, so Simone Signoret was cast instead. Signoret agreed to take the role after watching Harrington's 1961 film, Night Tide. Caan was cast after his appearances in two Howard Hawks films.

=== Filming ===
The film was shot on a budget of $1 million. Though set in Manhattan, it was filmed at Universal Studios in Los Angeles, California, beginning November 30, 1966.

== Release ==
Games premiered in New York City at the Sutton Theater on September 17, 1967. It subsequently opened at the Plaza Theatre in Los Angeles on January 25, 1968.

== Reception ==
=== Critical response ===
On the review aggregator website Rotten Tomatoes, the film has a 63% rating based on 8 reviews.

In The New York Times, Vincent Canby wrote, "Mr. Harrington's story might have been made to order for a 30-minute Alfred Hitchcock television show. In stretching it out to 98, commercial-free minutes, the director has been forced to pad, but the padding, which includes a strong, enigmatically humorous performance by Simone Signoret, is of top quality." Canby also found James Caan and Katherine Ross "attractive and believable", and concluded that the film is "a most diverting pastime".

=== Awards and nominations ===
Award	Year	Category	Nominee(s)	Result	Ref.
British Academy Film Award	1969	Best Actress in a Supporting Role	Simone Signoret	Nominated	
