= Lukas Heller =

German-born screenwriter (1930–1988)

- Born: 21 July 1930; Kiel, Germany
- Died: 2 November 1988 (age 58)
- Occupation: Screenwriter
- Spouse: Caroline Carter
- Children: Bruno Heller; Zoë Heller; Lucy Heller; Emily Heller
- Parent: Hermann Heller
- Relatives: Cordelia Edvardson (half-sister)

Lukas Heller (21 July 1930 – 2 November 1988) was a German-born British screenwriter. He was known for writing the screen adaptions for several Robert Aldrich films such as What Ever Happened to Baby Jane?, Hush...Hush, Sweet Charlotte and The Dirty Dozen. He won an Edgar Award for Hush...Hush, Sweet Charlotte.

== Biography ==
Heller was born to a Jewish family in Kiel, West Germany. His father was political philosopher Hermann Heller. His first screen credit was for writing additional dialogue for the 1959 British film Sapphire, directed by Basil Dearden and produced by Michael Relph. They hired him again to be co-writer on Victim (1961) but he was uncredited. He started working for Robert Aldrich, writing the screen adaption for What Ever Happened to Baby Jane? (1962), which was a big success. They worked together again on Hush...Hush, Sweet Charlotte (1964) for which he won an Edgar Award with Henry Farrell, who also wrote the source text. He also worked with Aldrich on The Flight of the Phoenix (1965), The Dirty Dozen (1967), The Killing of Sister George (1968) and Too Late the Hero (1970).

He later worked for Walter Hill co-writing Blue City (1986) with the director and working uncredited on Extreme Prejudice (1987). He also worked uncredited on Force 10 from Navarone (1978).

He wrote for television with NBC's Hitler's SS: Portrait in Evil (1985).

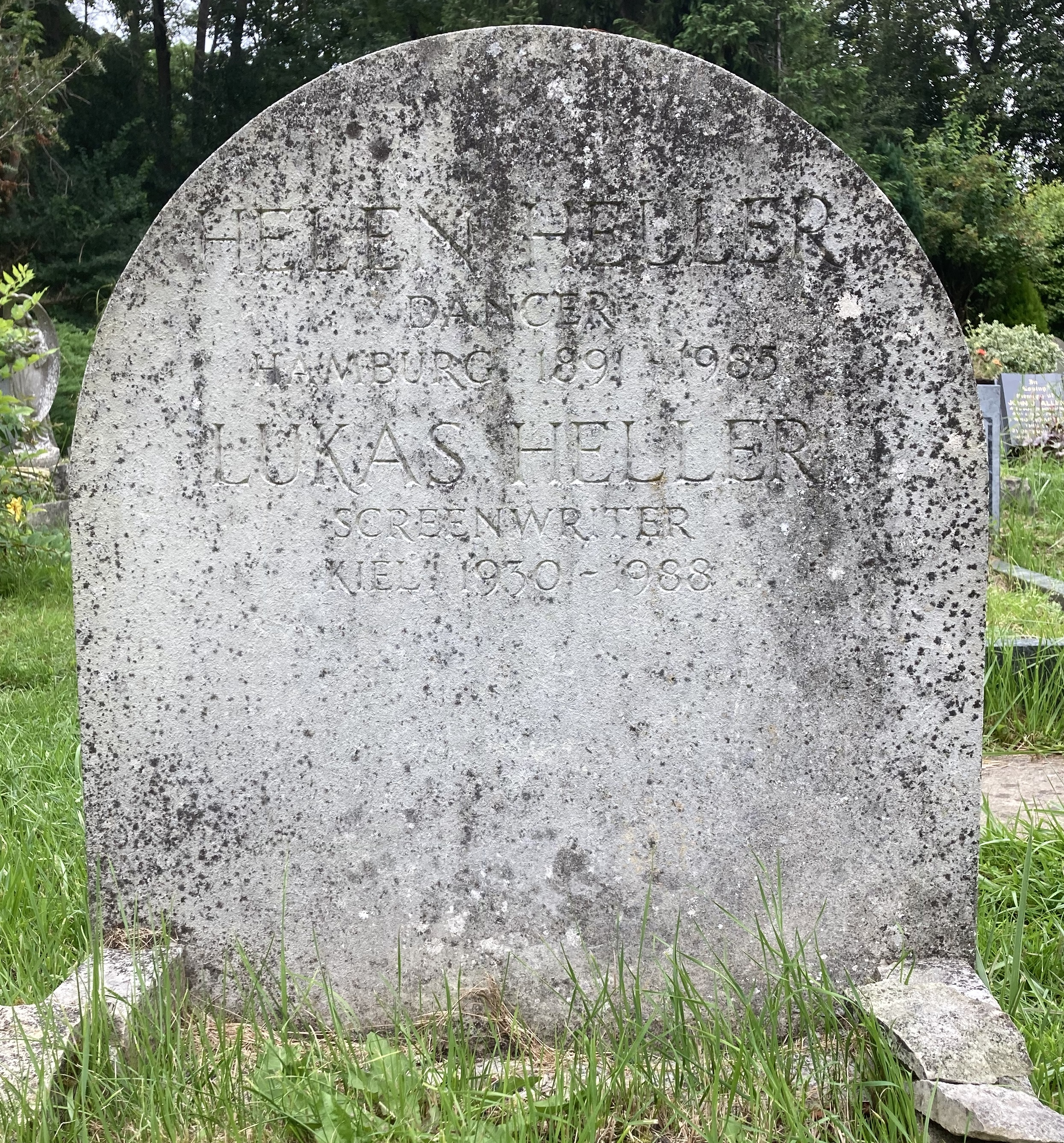
Grave of Lukas Heller in Highgate Cemetery

Heller was married to Caroline (née Carter) who was an English Quaker. They had four children: British writers Bruno and Zoë Heller, Lucy Heller, and Emily Heller. His half-sister was the Swedish journalist Cordelia Edvardson.

He died on 2 November 1988 of a heart attack and was buried on the eastern side of Highgate Cemetery in London, England.

== Filmography ==
- Sapphire (1959) (additional dialogue)
- Victim (1961) (uncredited)
- Never Back Losers (1961)
- Candidate for Murder (1962)
- What Ever Happened to Baby Jane? (1962)
- Hot Enough for June (1964)
- Hush...Hush, Sweet Charlotte (1964) (with Henry Farrell)
- The Flight of the Phoenix (1965)
- The Dirty Dozen (1967) (with Nunnally Johnson)
- The Killing of Sister George (1968) (with Frank Marcus)
- Too Late the Hero (1970) (with Robert Aldrich and Robert Sherman)
- Monte Walsh (1970) (with David Zelag Goodman)
- The Deadly Trackers (1973) (with Samuel Fuller)
- Damnation Alley (1977) (with Alan Sharp)
- Force 10 from Navarone (1978) (uncredited)
- Son of Hitler (1979) (with Burkhard Driest)
- Hitler's SS: Portrait in Evil (1985) (TV)
- Blue City (1986)
- Extreme Prejudice (1987) (uncredited)
