= The Dead Don't Die (1975 film) =

1975 American horror film

- Title card
- Genre: Horror; Thriller
- Written by: Robert Bloch
- Directed by: Curtis Harrington
- Starring: George Hamilton; Linda Cristal; Joan Blondell; Ralph Meeker; James McEachin; Reggie Nalder; Ray Milland
- Music by: Robert Prince
- Country of origin: United States
- Original language: English

Production
- Executive producers: Douglas S. Cramer; W.L. Baumes
- Producer: Henry Colman
- Production locations: Universal Studios - 100 Universal City Plaza, Universal City, California
- Cinematography: James Crabe
- Editor: Ronald J. Fagan
- Running time: 74 minutes
- Production company: Douglas S. Cramer Company

Original release
- Network: NBC
- Release: January 14, 1975

The Dead Don't Die is a 1975 American made-for-television neo-noir horror thriller film set in the 1930s, directed by Curtis Harrington from a teleplay by Robert Bloch, based upon his own story of the same title that first appeared in Fantastic Adventures, July 1951. The film originally premiered on NBC on January 14, 1975. The film uses the traditional Haitian concept of zombies as resurrected slaves of the living.

== Plot ==
In 1934, Don Drake returns to Chicago after a long sea voyage and discovers that his brother has been convicted of murdering his wife. Drake is unable to save him from the electric chair, but he is convinced of his brother’s innocence and is determined to clear his name. His investigation leads him to the Loveland Ballroom, the scene of the murder, where his brother was involved in a dance marathon run by Jim Moss.

Drake begins seeing his dead brother walking the foggy streets. Drake kills a man named Perdido, who later climbs out of a coffin and attacks him. Police Lieutenant Reardon doesn’t believe Drake’s story, and Reardon later finds Perdido is alive and well. As Drake presses his investigation, he learns of a mystery man named Varrick, whom no one has ever seen and who might be using Haitian voodoo to bring people back from the dead. Varrick turns out to be Jim Moss, played by Ray Milland, the voodoo master of the zombified slaves. Cornered by Varrick and his resurrected brother, Drake shows the zombified brother the body of his wife, and reveals that Varrick had her killed by Frank Speck.

== Reception ==
Bloch gives his opinion of the movie in his autobiography, Once Around the Bloch. "The Dead Don't Die. Maybe they don't, but the show did. Despite Curtis's casting of accomplished character actors, their supporting roles couldn't prop up the lead. And Ray Milland, who had given such a deftly paced performance in my script for Home Away from Home, merely plodded through his part here like a zombie without a deadline." ("Home Away from Home" is a short story by Bloch which he had adapted for Episode 1, Season 9 of Alfred Hitchcock Presents.)

Michael Weldon writes of the film that it is: "A tribute to the poverty-row horrors of the '30s that tries hard to be as ridiculous as the originals. A group of West Indians in Chicago plots to rule the world with zombies. Involves hammy acting from George Hamilton as hero Don Drake."

Videohound's Golden Movie Retriever comments that an "unbelievable plot set in the 1930s has Hamilton as a detective trying to prove his brother was wrongly executed for murder. He ultimately clashes with the madman who wants to rule the world with an army of zombies. Perhaps if they had cast Hamilton as Master of the Zombies." This guide awards the film only one 'bone' out of four, which equates to "poor use of camera, film, sets, script, actors and studio vehicles."

== Cast list ==
- George Hamilton as Don Drake
- Linda Cristal as Vera LaValle
- Joan Blondell as Levenia
- Ralph Meeker as Lt. Reardon
- James McEachin as Frankie Specht
- Reggie Nalder as Perdido
- Ray Milland as Jim Moss/Varrick
- Jerry Douglas as Ralph Drake
- William O'Connell as Priest
- Yvette Vickers as Miss Adrian

== See also ==
- List of American films of 1975
