= George Edwards (producer) =

American film producer

George Lockett Edwards III
- Born: July 19, 1924
- Died: November 27, 1991 (aged 67)
- Occupations: Producer, writer

George Lockett Edwards III (July 19, 1924 – November 27, 1991), the son of George Lockett Edwards Jr. and Columbia Maypole, was an American producer and writer best known for his work with Curtis Harrington.

== Select credits ==
- Voyage to the Prehistoric Planet (1965)
- Queen of Blood (1966)
- How Awful About Allan (1970)
- What's the Matter with Helen? (1971)
- Frogs (1972)
- Harper Valley PTA (1978)
- Chattanooga Choo Choo (1984)
