= Night Tide =

1961 film by Curtis Harrington

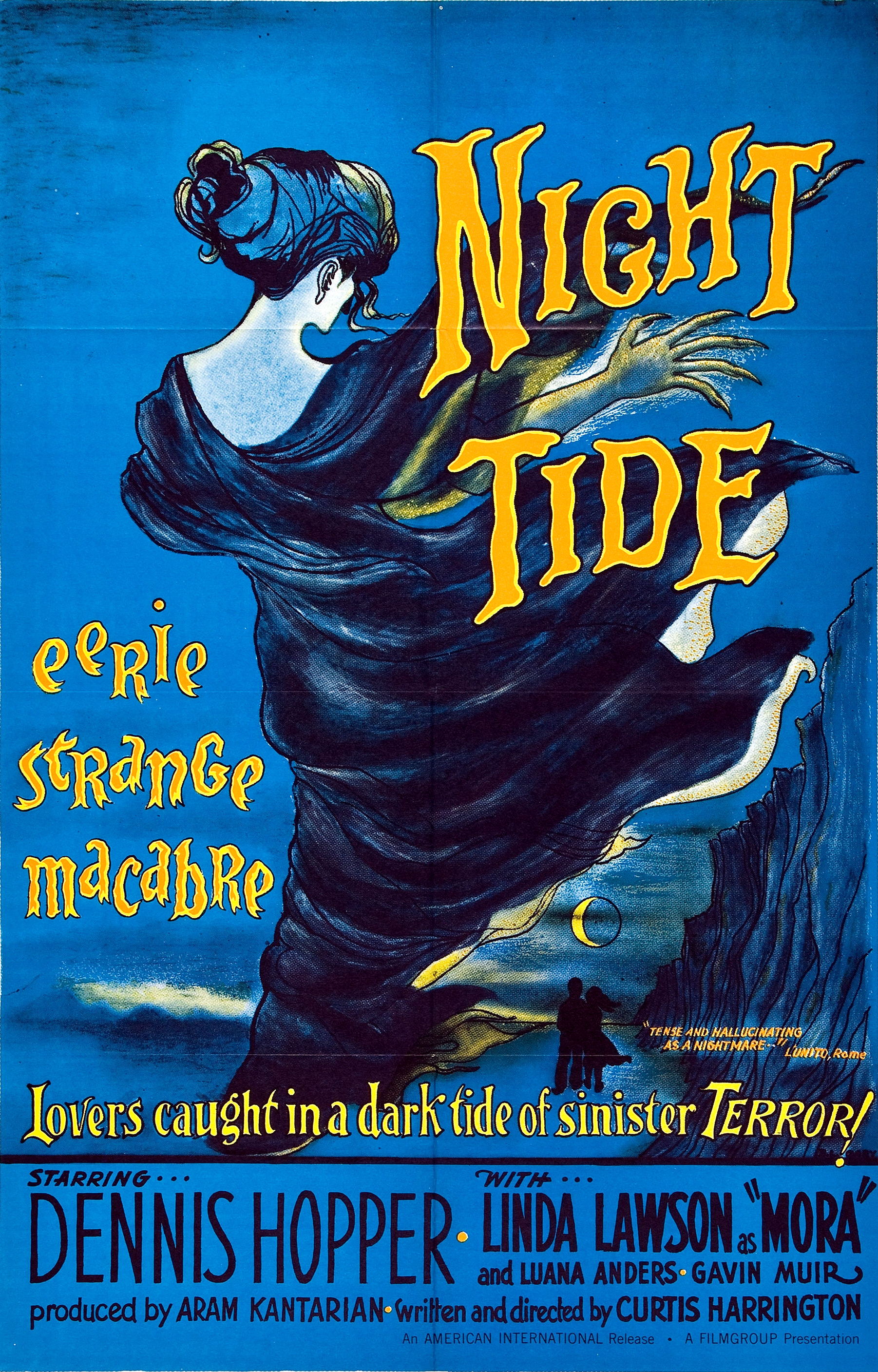
- Theatrical poster
- Directed by: Curtis Harrington
- Written by: Curtis Harrington
- Produced by: Aram Katarian
- Starring: Dennis Hopper; Linda Lawson; Luana Anders; Gavin Muir
- Cinematography: Vilis Lapenieks
- Edited by: Jodie Copelan
- Music by: David Raksin
- Production companies: Phoenix Films; Virgo Productions
- Distributed by: The Filmgroup; American International Pictures
- Release date: July 1961 (Spoleto Film Festival)
- Running time: 84 minutes
- Country: United States
- Language: English
- Budget: $75,000

Night Tide (1961) by Curtis Harrington

Night Tide is a 1961 American independent fantasy film sometimes considered to be a horror film, written and directed by Curtis Harrington and featuring Dennis Hopper in his first starring role. It was filmed in 1960, premiered in 1961, but was held up from general release until 1963. The film's title was inspired by some lines from Edgar Allan Poe's poem "Annabel Lee".

The film was released by American International Pictures as a double feature with Battle Beyond the Sun.

== Plot ==
Johnny Drake, a sailor on shore leave in Santa Monica, meets a young woman named Mora in a local jazz club. Mora tells him that she makes her living on the pier appearing as a mermaid in a sideshow attraction under the name 'Mora the Mermaid', a 'half-woman, half-fish', on the boardwalk, operated by Captain Murdock. She lives in an apartment above the amusement park that houses the merry-go-round. He goes to see her in her mermaid costume at the pier. Mora tells Johnny that Captain Murdock is her godfather and he found her as an orphan living on the Greek island of Mykonos. Captain Murdock refers to her as his 'ward'. Johnny becomes acquainted with the merry-go-round operator and his daughter Ellen, who warns Johnny that Mora may be dangerous, as her two previous boyfriends both drowned under mysterious circumstances.

As Mora and Johnny become closer, Mora tells him that she believes she is a siren, one of the legendary creatures who lure sailors to their deaths under the influence of the moon. Johnny witnesses Mora being followed by a mysterious black-clad woman, the 'Sea Witch' whom she believes is one of the sirens, calling her to return to the sea to fulfill her destiny. However, Johnny does not believe that Mora is capable of killing anyone, and thinks she must be suffering from a delusion. During a scuba dive on the day of the full moon, Mora cuts Johnny's air hose, apparently attempting to drown him. He is forced to the surface. She swims out to sea and disappears.

Johnny is devastated, but returns to the boardwalk the following evening and goes to the sideshow, where he finds Captain Murdock at the entrance as usual. Peering into the mermaid tank, he sees Mora's corpse on display. Captain Murdock appears brandishing a gun, admitting to Johnny that he killed Mora's boyfriends because he could not bear the thought of her leaving him. Murdock fires at Johnny, but misses. The gunshots attract the attention of two policemen on the boardwalk, and Murdock and Johnny are taken into custody.

At the police station, Murdock confesses, saying he found and adopted Mora when she was a young orphan. He planted the idea that she was a mermaid, incapable of living the life of a normal woman, in her head as a way of binding her to him forever. When she matured and began to attract male attention, Murdock murdered the men she grew close to and let Mora think that she had caused their deaths. However, Murdock denies any knowledge of the strange figure Mora believed to be a siren.

As Johnny's shore leave ends, Ellen, who has taken an interest in him, visits the police station to bid him goodbye. He tells her that he will try to return in the future.

== Cast ==
- Dennis Hopper as Johnny Drake
- Linda Lawson as Mora
- Gavin Muir as Captain Samuel Murdock
- Luana Anders as Ellen Sands
- Marjorie Eaton as Madame Romanovitch
- Tom Dillon as Merry-Go-Round Operator, Ellen's Grandfather
- H.E. West as Lieutenant Henderson
- Ben Roseman as Bruno
- Marjorie Cameron as the Water Witch (credited as Cameron)
- Paul Horn as Jazz Saxophonist (uncredited)
- Joe Gordon as Jazz Trumpeter (uncredited)
- Jimmy Bond as Jazz Bassist (uncredited)
- Kenny Dennis as Jazz Drummer (uncredited)

== Production ==
=== Development ===
The movie was based on an original script by Curtis Harrington, originally called The Girl from Beneath the Sea. According to Spencer Kansa, Harrington based his script on a self-penned story titled "The Secrets of the Sea." Harrington admits the film was heavily influenced by Cat People and also the works of William Hope Hodgson whose fiction often involved the sea, notably The House on the Borderland. The title "Night Tide" came from the Edgar Allan Poe poem "Annabel Lee".

Kansa states that prior to filming the director had turned down an offer from the Mickey Cohen gang to finance the picture. "They were very charming men but I had visions that if the film didn't do well I'd end up at the bottom of the LA river in a block of cement!"

Harrington estimated the final budget as between $75,000 and $80,000 although he says the cash outlay was $50,000. Harrington raised this in part from Pathe Laboratories, using a distribution guarantee from Roger Corman's Filmgroup. Corman also introduced Harrington to Aram Kantarin, who worked at MCA and wanted to move into producing; Kantarian invested $10,000 with the rest of the money coming from other investors including an entrepreneur in the construction business. Roger Corman did not invest directly in the film, however.

=== Casting ===
Harrington said Hopper's casting came about when he met socially and expressed admiration for Harrington's short films. Harrington gave Hopper a script and the actor agreed to make it.

The role of Mora the Mermaid (played by Lawson) was originally to be played by Susan Harrison, who had been the lead in Sweet Smell of Success (1957). Harrison, at the time a friend of director Harrington, initially agreed to take the role, but then reneged when the person she was seeing in a relationship at the time pushed her out of doing the film.

Harrington offered the role of the Captain to Peter Lorre and Marcel Dalio but both turned it down due to the low salary before casting Gavin Muir.

Harrington had previously worked with actress Cameron; his 1956 short (10-minute) documentary The Wormwood Star is about Cameron and her artwork.

=== Filming ===
In order to film some of the underwater sequences in Night Tide, director Curtis Harrington gave detailed instructions to a cameraman who then shot the scenes underwater at the director's request.

Filming took place on location at Santa Monica Beach. Harrington says it was mostly shot using a non-union crew but if shot one week with a union crew so that the movie could be screened in theatres by projectionists (otherwise they would refuse as a non-union movie). These scenes were all the studio built interiors such as Mora's apartment, the police station and the hotel room.

The mermaid mural for the sideshow attraction in which Mora stars was painted for the film by Paul Mathison. Mathison was an associate of Cameron's, who had been part of her magical circle with Jack Parsons, starred as Pan in Kenneth Anger's film Inauguration of the Pleasure Dome and also costumed Cameron and dressed the set for Harrington's 1956 short documentary on Cameron, The Wormwood Star. According to Spencer Kansa, the mural "if you look closely hides a clue to the finale of the picture."

Harrington wrote the filming in general went smoothly apart from the last day. Dennis Hopper got too drunk at lunchtime to finish afternoon filming and was involved in an accident; the rest of the scene had to be shot several weeks later.

== Release and reception ==
Night Tide premiered at the Spoleto Film Festival in Spoleto, Italy in July 1961, where it was named the top American film that year.

The film also screened at the Venice Film Festival in August 1961. Reviewing the movie, Variety wrote "if Harrington displays a good flair for narration and mounting, his feel for mood, suspense and atmospherics is not too highly developed as yet."

The film's production company, Virgo, defaulted on their Pathé Lab loan of $33,793 and Pathé was preparing to foreclose on the picture. Roger Corman asked the lab to hold off on their legal actions to allow Filmgroup to distribute the film, guaranteeing Pathé $15,000 within 12 months of the film's release. Pathé agreed, and Filmgroup released it through American International Pictures. It was given a general theatrical release in the United States two years after its initial premiere, opening in Detroit on February 13, 1963. It later screened in New York City on May 25, 1964.

Harrington admits the film did "Very poorly. In its defense, I will say that it was given a particularly unfortunate release pattern, because Roger double-billed it with a very poor Soviet science fiction film called Battle Beyond the Sun. It was terrible, badly dubbed, but it was in color, and it had a few special effects in it. In terms of the distribution pattern at that time, all Night Tide needed was to go out on a double-bill with, say, The Raven (1963)."

Dennis Hopper stated in an interview that the film was made for $28,000 and...

It was on Time Magazine’s Ten Best Films to see the year it was distributed — or more accurately, the year it wasn’t distributed. We couldn’t get anyone to show the film, because we didn’t have the union logo on our film, which meant we didn’t have approval. We couldn’t get a theater. So that was the beginning of the independent cinema movement in this country.

The entry for the film in Horror: The Aurum Film Encyclopedia states "Clearly inspired by Cat People (1942), following Val Lewton's principles by having a vividly realistic setting (the tawdry pier and funfairs) and providing a rational explanation for most of the mystery (the girl's adoptive father planted the siren story in her mind), it is both clumsy and tentative and strikingly atmospheric. More of a fantasy than a horror movie perhaps, the film does make darkly minatory use of its dream sequences (the mermaid nightmarishly metamorphosing into an octopus) and the recurrent motif of the mysterious woman in black whose appearances frighten the girl."

== Legacy ==
The film was restored from the original negative by the Academy Film Archive in 2007. A fan of the film, Nicolas Winding Refn purchased the negative from the director's estate and then produced a new 4K digital restoration that was released in 2020.

=== Musical ===
A musical theater adaptation with music by Nathania Wibowo and book and lyrics by Taylor Tash was featured in the 2017 New York Musical Theatre Festival and premiered at the Towle Theater in Hammond, Indiana during its 2021 season.

== Copyright ==
The film is in the public domain, as the copyright wasn't renewed.

== Sources ==
- Maxford, Howard (1996). The A-Z of Horror Films. London, England: Batsford. ISBN 978-0-713-47973-7.
- Shelley, Peter (2009). Grande Dame Guignol Cinema: A History of Hag Horror from Baby Jane to Mother. Jefferson, North Carolina: McFarland. ISBN 978-0-786-44569-1.
- Harrington, Curtis (2013). Nice Guys Don't Work in Hollywood : The Adventures of An Aesthete in the Movie Business. Drag City. ISBN 978-1-937112-07-3.
- Kansa, Spencer (2001). Wormwood Star: The Magickal Life of Marjorie Cameron. Oxford, UK: Mandrake. ISBN 978-1-906958-08-4.
- Kelley, Bill (November–December 1992). "Horror's First Experimentalist Curtis Harrington". Video Watchdog. No. 14. pp. 28–46.
