= Henry Farrell =

American writer (1920–2006)

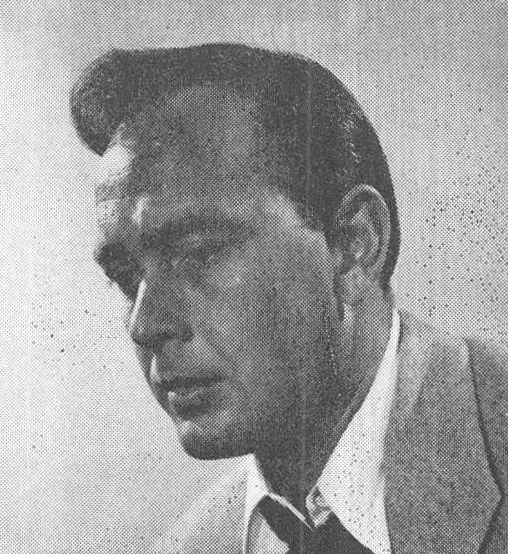
- Charles F. Myers c. 1952
- Born: Charles Farrell Myers; September 27, 1920; Madera County, California, U.S.
- Died: March 29, 2006 (aged 85); Pacific Palisades, California, U.S.
- Occupations: Novelist, screenwriter
- Spouse: Molly Dodd (died 1981)

Henry Farrell (September 27, 1920 – March 29, 2006) was an American novelist and screenwriter, best known as the author of the renowned gothic horror story What Ever Happened to Baby Jane?, which was made into a film starring Bette Davis and Joan Crawford.

== Life and work ==
He was born Charles Farrell Myers in California, and grew up in Chowchilla, California. Under the name Charles F. Myers, he wrote the "Toffee" short stories in SF magazines in the 1940s and 1950s. Later taking the pseudonym Henry Farrell, his first novel was The Hostage, published in 1959. It was filmed in 1966.

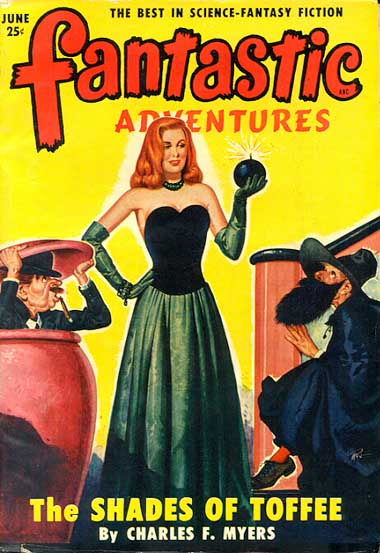
Myers's "The Shades of Toffee" was the cover story in the June 1950 issue of Fantastic Adventures

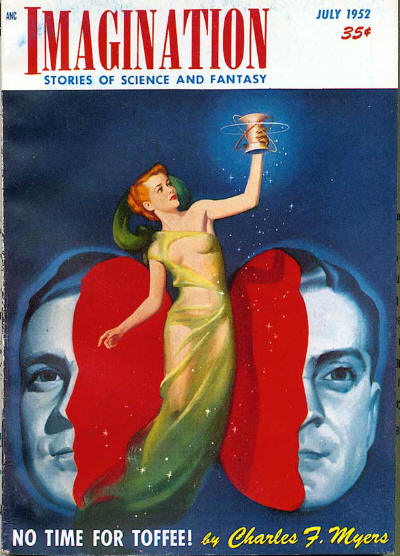
Another Toffee story was cover-featured in Imagination

With Lukas Heller, he co-wrote the screenplay for Hush...Hush, Sweet Charlotte (1964), starring Davis and Olivia de Havilland. It was based on a story he wrote titled "What Ever Happened to Cousin Charlotte?", and the script earned Heller and Farrell a 1965 Edgar Award from the Mystery Writers of America for Best Motion Picture Screenplay. He wrote the original screenplay for What's the Matter with Helen? (1971), which starred Debbie Reynolds and Shelley Winters.

His wife was actress Molly Dodd, who died in 1981. Dodd appeared in small roles in two movies written by Farrell, the TV production How Awful About Allan, starring Anthony Perkins and Julie Harris and What's the Matter with Helen? French director François Truffaut's 1972 movie Such a Gorgeous Kid Like Me was based on Farrell's 1967 novel of the same name.

== Death ==
Henry Farrell died in his home in Pacific Palisades, California at age 85. According to his obituary, he completed another novel, titled A Piece of Clarisse, shortly before his death. There is currently no word on publication.

== Novels ==
- The Shades of Toffee (1950) (as Charles F. Myers)
- The Hostage (1959)
- What Ever Happened to Baby Jane? (1960)
- Death on the Sixth Day (1961)
- How Awful About Allan (1963)
- Such a Gorgeous Kid Like Me (1967)

== Short stories ==
=== As Charles F. Myers ===
- "I'll Dream of You" (1947)
- "You Can't Scare Me!" (1947)
- "Toffee Takes a Trip" (1947)
- "Toffee Haunts a Ghost" (1947)
- "The Spirit of Toffee" (1948)
- "Toffee Turns the Trick" (1949)
- "The Shades of Toffee" (1950)
- "The Vengeance of Toffee" (1951)
- "Double Identity" (1951)
- "No Time for Toffee!" (1952)
- "The Laughter of Toffee" (1954)
- "Blessed Event" (1954)

=== As Henry Farrell ===
- "What Ever Happened to Cousin Charlotte?"
- "The Eyes of Charles Sand"
- "Where Beauty Lies"
- "The Do-Gooder"

== Filmography ==
- Bus Stop (1961) - 1 episode ("Jaws of Darkness")
- Alfred Hitchcock Presents (1962) - 1 episode ("Where Beauty Lies")
- Hush...Hush, Sweet Charlotte (1964, with Lukas Heller)
- The Hostage (1966)
- Perry Mason (1965–66) - 2 episodes ("The Case of the Wrathful Wraith", "The Case of the Bogus Buccaneers")
- How Awful About Allan (1970, TV movie)
- The House That Would Not Die (1970, TV movie)
- What's the Matter with Helen? (1971)
- The Eyes of Charles Sand (1972, TV movie)

== See also ==
- List of horror fiction authors
