= What's the Matter with Helen? =

1971 film by Curtis Harrington

What's the Matter With Helen?
- Theatrical release poster
- Directed by: Curtis Harrington
- Written by: Henry Farrell
- Produced by: George Edwards
- Starring: Debbie Reynolds; Shelley Winters; Dennis Weaver; Agnes Moorehead; Micheál Mac Liammóir
- Cinematography: Lucien Ballard
- Edited by: William H. Reynolds
- Music by: David Raksin
- Production companies: Filmways Pictures; Raymax Productions; Raven Productions
- Distributed by: United Artists
- Release date: June 30, 1971
- Running time: 101 minutes
- Country: United States
- Language: English

What's the Matter With Helen? is a 1971 American psychological horror film directed by Curtis Harrington from a screenplay by Henry Farrell. It stars Debbie Reynolds and Shelley Winters, with supporting roles played by Dennis Weaver, Agnes Moorehead and Micheál Mac Liammóir. The film is categorized as a part of the "psycho-biddy" subgenre of the 1960s and early 1970s.

The film was released by United Artists on June 30, 1971. It received a mixed reception on initial release, though retrospective reviews have been more positive. At the 44th Academy Awards, the film was nominated for Best Costume Design.

== Plot ==
In mid-1930s Iowa, (Note: A then-current newsreel clip reporting on First Lady Eleanor Roosevelt's trip to Puerto Rico establishes the film as beginning in March 1934.) Leonard Hill and Wesley Bruckner are seen being loaded into a paddy wagon to face life sentences in prison for the murder of Ellie Banner. Their mothers, Helen Hill and Adelle Bruckner fight a crowd to their car. In the car, Helen reveals that someone in the crowd cut the palm of her left hand. Soon at home and tending to her wound, Helen receives an anonymous phone call from a man, "I'm the one who cut you...I wanted to see you bleed." This caller threatens to make the mothers pay for the sins of their sons.

Helen and Adelle change their names, leave Iowa, and head to Hollywood, where they open a dance academy for little girls who want to be the next Shirley Temple. Soon after arriving, Hamilton Starr, an elocution teacher, offers his services to Helen and Adelle's school, and Adelle takes him up on his offer, much to Helen's chagrin, as Helen is frightened of the menacing man. Soon, the phone calls resume and Helen believes a strange man is watching their home. She has hallucinations, especially at a show where she thinks she sees Starr with a knife.

Adelle falls in love with Lincoln Palmer, the father of a student, and Helen grows jealous of the budding relationship. Helen takes solace in her faith, listening to a radio show hosted by evangelist Sister Alma. Helen's jealousy of Adelle's romance with Lincoln leads to a fight, at which point Adelle demands that Helen move out. Adelle then heads for her date with Lincoln. As Helen readies herself to move out, a mysterious intruder enters the house, walks up the staircase, and calls her real name. Helen reacts by pushing him down the stairs. When he lands at the bottom, his head is gashed open, blood is seeping onto the floor, and Helen envisions her late husband, who was mutilated by a plow, and the dead Ellie Banner.

Adelle arrives home to find the dead stranger and, fearing publicity, decides to dispose of the body. As the rain pours, she and Helen drag the dead man into the street and dump his body into an open hole, adjacent to their home, where crews had been doing construction. The body is discovered the next morning and it is presumed that the man fell into the hole to his death. Helen's guilt builds and she visits the church to see Sister Alma and to atone for her sins. Sister Alma offers her forgiveness, but an irrational Helen creates a spectacle and is dragged away by Adelle. Helen is later ordered to take bedrest by her doctor.

Adelle goes to a miniature golf course with Lincoln, where he proposes. He drives her home to make preparations to elope that evening. Arriving home, Adelle notices that Helen is not in her room and follows a trail of blood out the back door and down to a rabbit cage, where she finds Helen's pet rabbits slaughtered. Helen steps out of the shadows and reveals that she killed them and that she pushed her husband off a plow to his death. Adelle leads Helen into the house and is phoning Sister Alma when she lets it slip that she plans to wed Lincoln. Helen then pulls a knife from her robe and stabs Adelle in the back. As Adelle falls dead, the doorbell chimes. Helen answers the door, finding a detective who shows her a photo of the man she pushed down the staircase. When she claims not to recognize him, the detective reveals that the man was Ellie Banner's boyfriend, who came to California with plans to murder the two women.

Later, Lincoln arrives, expecting to whisk Adelle away. From the street, he can hear someone pounding out "Goody Goody" on the piano. He enters the house, calling Adelle's name, and follows the sound of the piano up to the rehearsal hall. There, he finds Helen giddily playing the song with Adelle's corpse, dressed in her signature dance costume, tied to a ladder on stage. The film ends with Helen laughing, completely insane.

== Cast ==
- Debbie Reynolds as Adelle Bruckner (later Adelle Stuart)
- Shelley Winters as Helen Hill (later Helen Martin)
- Dennis Weaver as Lincoln "Linc" Palmer
- Micheál MacLiammóir as Hamilton Starr
- Agnes Moorehead as Sister Alma
- Logan Ramsey as Detective Sergeant West
- Samee Lee Jones as Winona Palmer
- Robbi Morgan as Rosalie Greenbaum
- Timothy Carey as The Tramp
- Swen Swenson as The Gigolo
- Debbie Van Den Houten as Sue Ann
- Teresa De Rose as Donna
- James Dobson as Billy
- Helene Winston as Mrs. Greenbaum
- Peggy Rea as Mrs. Schultz
- Yvette Vickers as Mrs. Barker
- Molly Dodd as Mrs. Rigg
- Sadie Delfino as The Little Lady
- Pamelyn Ferdin as Kiddie Emcee

Uncredited

- Peter Brocco as Old man
- Minta Durfee as Old lady
- Peggy Patten as Ellie Banner

== Production ==
Director Curtis Harrington and producer George Edwards approached writer Henry Farrell soon after What Ever Happened to Baby Jane? was a hit, hoping to get a screenplay. Farrell told them of a story outline titled "The Box Step", the story of two contemporary ladies who ran a dance studio. The story was optioned by another studio before Harrington and Edwards could get it. Eventually the story wound up with Harrington and Edwards, who had input on the screenplay. It was their idea to change the setting to a 1930s dance academy for little girls. After the screenplay was developed under the working title The Best of Friends, Universal Studios, where Harrington worked, turned it down because they could not find a name star to take a role.

Eventually, Debbie Reynolds took the role of Adelle. She had a contract with NBC to be an uncredited producer of a film, so she chose this, taking no salary. "They put up $750,000 and hired Marty Ransohoff to be on the set, but I actually produced it," said Reynolds.

Harrington asked Shelley Winters if she would take the lead role, and Winters agreed without reading the script. Winters recounted how she took the role saying, "I wrote a play called One Night Stands of a Noisy Passenger... The previews caused such anxiety that I decided I shouldn't be there for opening night. I tried to figure out what to do, and Curtis Harrington called me about What's the Matter with Helen?" Winters changed her mind about missing opening night when she talked to The New York Times' Guy Flatley. "Three and a half years on those plays, and I'm not even going to be there for the opening!" she said. "If it weren't for the actors' strike, we would have opened weeks ago. But now I've got this movie... It's about two women during the thirties who run a school to turn out Shirley Temples, and in my next scene I have to stab Debbie Reynolds to death. Poor Debbie — they'd better not give me a real knife." The night before her death scene was to be filmed, Reynolds dreamed that the prop knife was replaced with a real one. She checked the next morning, and discovered the knife had been switched and found herself arguing with the prop master, who did not initially believe her. "Who changed it? Well, that's up for grabs," Reynolds said with a laugh.

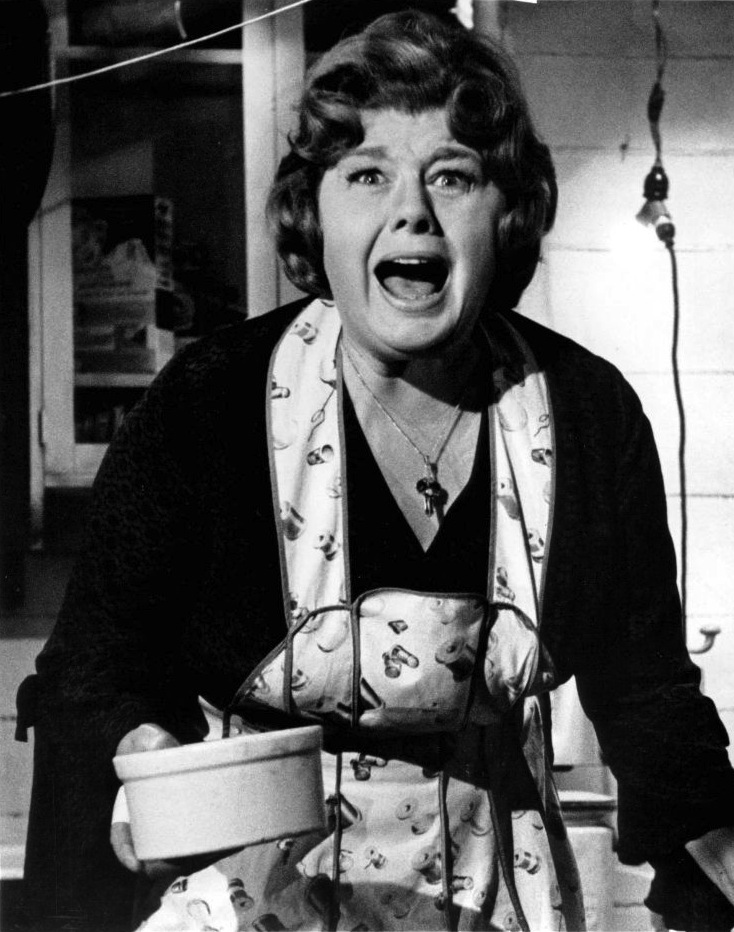
Shelley Winters as Helen Hill

According to Reynolds, Winters's psychiatrist advised her not to portray "a woman having a nervous breakdown because she was having an actual nervous breakdown!" "But nobody knew that, and so all through the film she drove all of us insane! She became the person in the film." Reynolds witnessed Winters's questionable mental status off of the set. The two had been friends many years before, and Reynolds offered to chauffeur Winters to and from the set. "I was driving one morning on Santa Monica Boulevard and ahead of me was a woman, wearing only a nightgown, trying to flag down a ride," recalled Reynolds. It was Winters, saying "I thought I was late." According to a Los Angeles Times article published while the film was in production, Winters was so difficult on the set that the studio threatened to replace her with Geraldine Page.

Interiors were filmed on soundstages at General Service Studios and exteriors on Columbia Movie Ranch Modern Street, the film began work under the title The Best of Friends, but Otto Preminger protested to the Motion Picture Association because he had registered the similar title Such Good Friends. "I wanted Best of Friends," said Reynolds. "It was a battle; it cost money..."

There was little meddling from the studio during the production, though executives wanted Winters to tone down the latent lesbian aspect of her character. "They didn't want me to play [the lesbianism] too directly, but I did", said Winters. "I guess you could interpret it either way, but I played it very clearly. I hope I did, anyway." Additional problems arose in post-production. After Adelle and Helen disposed of the letter-carrier's body, Winters had the idea that she should "let the lesbian thing come out for a moment" by kissing Reynolds on the lips. Harrington agreed and the opening of the scene was shot with this moment, but it was cut to keep the film from attaining an R-rating.

A similar cut came during the murder of Adelle. Harrington wanted the moment to be "as harrowing and brutal as the shower scene in Psycho,” but the studio made him cut the moment down because the violence would have guaranteed the film an R-rating. The film was liked by critics and audiences, but film historians said it was given the worst advertising campaign for the time, as it featured a murdered Adelle in the ad and TV commercial, minimizing the shock value and giving away the ending. After this event, studios were more careful to keep end-stills and similar "spoiler" material regarding horror and suspense films out of commercial advertising.

In September 1972, in what amounted to an inside the profession joke, actresses Helene Winston and Samee Lee Jones reunited on an episode of the comedy series Love American Style entitled "Love and the Amateur Night". Essentially reprising their roles as a brash stage mother and a precocious Shirley Temple wannabe (named "Debbie", presumably for Debbie Reynolds), Winston and Jones interrupt the honeymoon of a TV personality and hold an impromptu audition, with Jones again performing the song "Animal Crackers in My Soup".

== Release ==
=== Home media ===
The film was released on Blu-ray by Shout! Factory on March 28, 2017.

== Reception ==
=== Critical response ===
Roger Ebert gave the film 1.5 out of 4 stars, calling it a "menopausal metaphysical mystery movie", and writing "The whole movie is very 1930s, right down to the phony studio streets and the 20-foot shadow that comes around the corner five seconds before the actor does." Vincent Canby from The New York Times wrote, "This new movie is so perfunctory, it's likely to give misogyny a bad name." Variety wrote in their review of the film "What's the Matter with Helen? is an okay exploitation shocker starring Debbie Reynolds and Shelley Winters as two Hollywood types of the early sound era caught up in mayhem and mutual suspicion. The good red-herring script is hindered from maximum impact by director Curtis Harrington, who raises the interest and excitement level too early and lets the film coast to less-than-tense resolution."

Time Out gave the film a positive review, favorably comparing Harrington's direction to that Josef von Sternberg, writing, "directed by Curtis Harrington. ... He films this as Sternberg might have, with a great emphasis on masks and facades, underpinned with gorgeous fairytale motifs. Plus he stages the best tango since The Conformist." Eric Henderson from Slant offered similar praise, writing, "The layers of pastiche that fuel What’s the Matter with Helen? multiply like Shelly [sic] Winters's titular character’s fat white rabbits."

On Rotten Tomatoes, the film holds an approval rating of 55% based on 9 reviews, with a weighted average rating of 5.07/10.

=== Awards and nominations ===
Award	Year	Category	Nominee	Result	Ref.
Academy Awards	1972	Best Costume Design	Morton Haack	Nominated	

== Merchandise ==
=== Soundtrack ===
A soundtrack containing David Raksin's score from the film was released in 1975 by Dynamation Records—seemingly the company's only release. The album was "pressed and distributed on a limited, non-commercial basis" and offered for sale via mail-order from magazine advertisements. The album includes two piano variations of "Goody Goody", but does not include any songs that were performed in the film. No names are given to the 14 divided album tracks, on the jacket or the LP label, and one track has a four-second gap of silence, as if its two tracks jammed into one groove. During post-production, the film underwent additional editing, so portions of the score were truncated and removed. The LP "presents the music as it was originally conceived and recorded", with two tracks that do not appear in the film, and several that are considerably longer than the versions in the film.

=== Book ===
A movie tie-in novelization, written by Richard Deming, was published by Beagle Books and rushed into bookstores to coincide with the release of the film. Based on Farrell's screenplay, the book follows the script fairly closely but deviates from the film on several occasions, most often in backstories. Both Helen and Adelle are described as "slim and attractive" and as "women in their mid-thirties"; Helen's character is blonde and Adelle's is brunette.

== See also ==
- List of American films of 1971
- Psycho-biddy
