= Don't Let Go (2002 film) =

- Directed by: Max Myers
- Screenplay by: Max Myers
- Story by: Max Myers
- Produced by: Ken Schur, Brad Wilson
- Starring: Scott Wilson; Katharine Ross; Brad Hawkins; Levi Kreis; James Keane; Justin Shilton; Michael Davison; Christine Carlo; Tanya Garret; Irma P. Hall; Bo Hopkins; Mac Curtis
- Cinematography: Carlos Gaviria, Greg Harrington
- Edited by: Rick Fiels, Max Myers
- Music by: Keith Allison
- Production companies: A Pardner Productions; Hemisphere Entertainment
- Release date: March 14, 2002
- Running time: 93 minutes
- Country: United States
- Language: English
- Budget: $1.2 million

Don't Let Go is an American independent feature film released in 2002, written and directed by Max Myers. It won an Outstanding Directorial Achievement award at the Stony Brook Film Festival in New York, the Best Picture Award at the Westchester Film Festival (NY) and a Prism Award in Los Angeles.

== Story ==
Jimmy Ray (played by Scott Wilson) is a Rockabilly star who is legendary both because of his great songs and because of his premature musical retirement, due to the death of his brother. Years later his own sons have their own band. Jimmy Ray who is a heavy drinker and still grieving decades later is furious with his sons for wanting to choose the path of music. His wife, (played by Oscar-winner Katharine Ross), tries to keep the peace.
