= Katharine Ross =

American actress (born 1940)

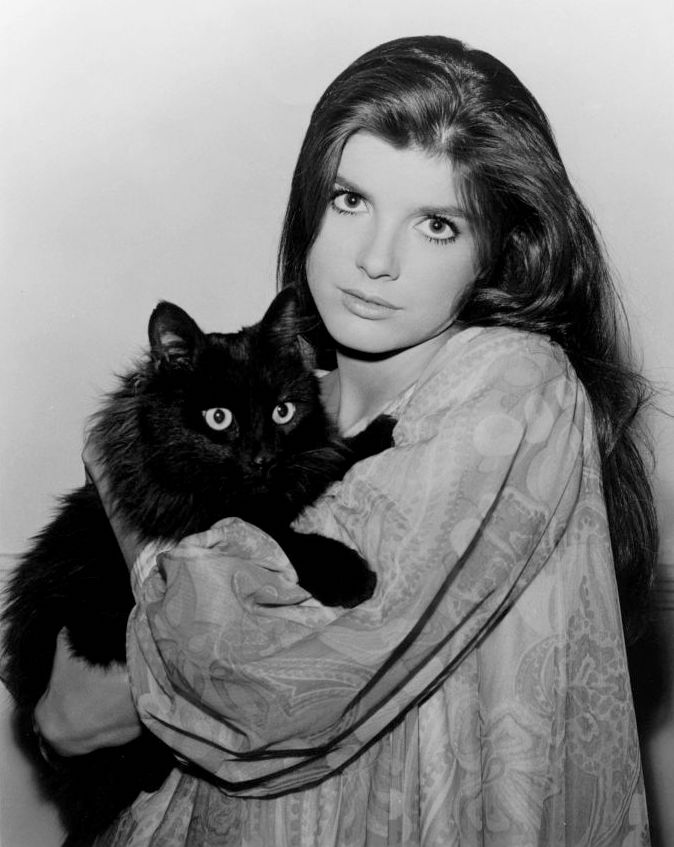
- Ross in 1966
- Born: Katharine Juliet Ross; January 29, 1940 (age 86); Los Angeles, California, U.S.
- Occupation: Actress
- Years active: 1962–2019
- Spouses: Joel Fabiani (m. 1960; div. 1962); John Marion (m. 1964; div. 1967); Conrad Hall (m. 1969; div. 1974); Gaetano Lisi (m. 1974; div. 1979); Sam Elliott (m. 1984)
- Children: 1

Katharine Juliet Ross (born January 29, 1940) (Note: Early in her career, Ross changed her date of birth from January 29, 1940 to "January 29, 1943" for publication. Reference sources began emending this in 2002 after the California Birth Index became accessible, but the error persisted well into the post-internet era. As late as 2008, for example, Vanity Fair was still shaving three years off.) is an American retired actress. Her accolades include an Academy Award nomination, a BAFTA Award, and two Golden Globe Awards.

An alumna of the Actor's Workshop, Ross made her television debut in 1962. She made her film debut in the Civil War drama Shenandoah (1965), and had supporting parts in Mister Buddwing and The Singing Nun (both 1966) before being cast in Curtis Harrington's Games (1967), a thriller co-starring James Caan and Simone Signoret. At Signoret's recommendation, Ross was cast as Elaine Robinson in Mike Nichols' comedy-drama The Graduate (1967), which saw her receive significant critical acclaim, including an Academy Award nomination for Best Supporting Actress, a BAFTA nomination, and Golden Globe win for New Star of the Year. She garnered further acclaim for her roles in two 1969 Westerns: Butch Cassidy and the Sundance Kid and Tell Them Willie Boy Is Here, for both of which she won the BAFTA Award for Best Actress.

In the 1970s, Ross had a leading role in the horror film The Stepford Wives (1975), for which she won the Saturn Award for Best Actress, and won her second Golden Globe award for her performance in the drama Voyage of the Damned (1976). Her other roles during this period included the disaster film The Swarm (1978), the supernatural horror film The Legacy (1978), and the science-fiction film The Final Countdown (1980). Ross spent the majority of the 1980s appearing in a number of made-for-TV films, including Murder in Texas (1981) and The Shadow Riders (1982), and later starred on the network series The Colbys from 1985 to 1987.

Ross spent the majority of the 1990s in semiretirement, although she returned to film with a supporting part in Richard Kelly's cult film Donnie Darko (2001). In 2016, she provided a voice role for the animated comedy series American Dad!, and the following year starred in the comedy-drama The Hero (2017), opposite her husband, Sam Elliott.

== Early life ==
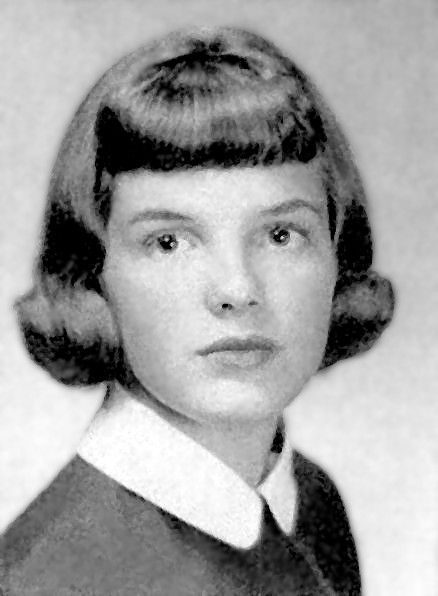
Ross' senior yearbook portrait, from the 1957 Las Lomas High School yearbook (1956; age 16).

Ross was born in Los Angeles on January 29, 1940, when her father, Dudley Tyng Ross (1906–1991), was a lieutenant in the United States Navy. A native of Sonyea, New York, he had also worked for the Associated Press. Ross's mother, the former Katharine Elizabeth Washburn (née Hall; 1909–1993), was born in Indianapolis and later moved to the San Francisco Bay Area. She married Ross's father there in 1937. The family resided for a time in Washington, D.C., before moving to Walnut Creek, California.

Ross was a keen horse rider in her youth and was friends with rodeo rider Casey Tibbs. She graduated from Las Lomas High School in 1957. Ross studied for one year at Santa Rosa Junior College, where she was introduced to acting via a production of The King and I. While attending SRJC, she met her first husband, future actor Joel Fabiani. Ross transferred to Diablo Valley College in 1958. Eventually moving to San Francisco, she joined the Actor's Workshop and was with them for three years. For one role in Jean Genet's The Balcony, she appeared nude on stage.

== Career ==
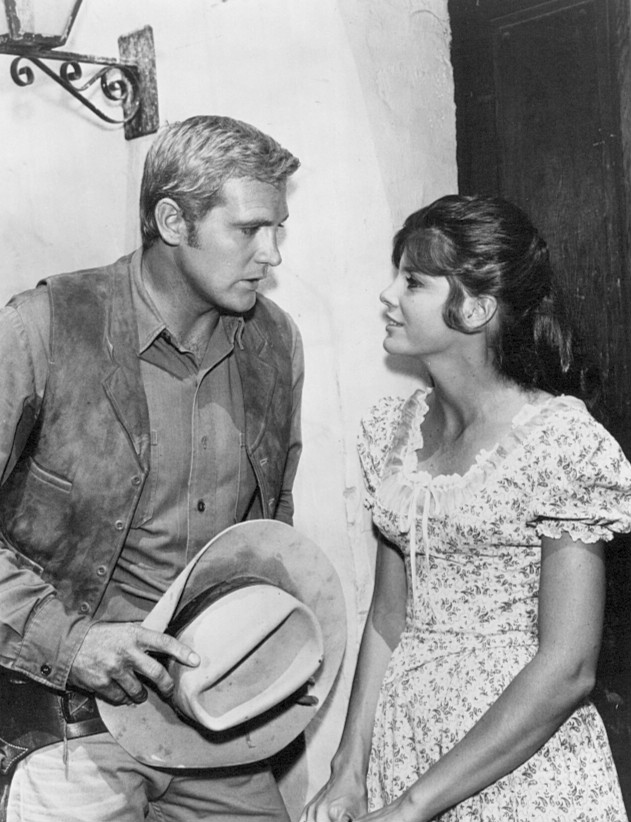
With Lee Majors in an episode of The Big Valley (1965)

In 1964, Ross was cast by John Houseman as Cordelia in a stage production of King Lear.

While at the workshop, she began acting in television series in Los Angeles to earn extra money. She was brought to Hollywood by Metro, dropped, then picked up by Universal.

Ross auditioned but was not hired for a role in the film West Side Story (1961). Her first television role was in Sam Benedict in 1962.

She was signed by agent Wally Hiller, and in 1964, Ross appeared in episodes of Kraft Suspense Theatre, The Lieutenant, Arrest and Trial, The Virginian, The Great Adventure, Ben Casey, Mr. Novak, Wagon Train, Bob Hope Presents the Chrysler Theatre, Run for Your Life, Gunsmoke, and The Alfred Hitchcock Hour ("Dividing Wall", 1963), as well as playing the love interest of Heath Barkley opposite Lee Majors on The Big Valley (season one, episode seven-"Winner Loses All"). She screen-tested for The Young Lovers.

Ross made her first film, Shenandoah in 1965, playing the daughter-in-law of James Stewart. She returned to guest-starring on shows including The Loner, The Wild Wild West, and The Road West. MGM put her in an unsold TV pilot about Bible stories. She signed a long-term deal with Universal, which called her an "American Samantha Eggar", despite some misgivings: "I didn't want a contract in the movies, but a lot of people convinced me it was a good thing to do."

MGM borrowed her for supporting parts in The Singing Nun (1966) and Mister Buddwing (1966), the latter starring James Garner.

=== Mainstream breakthrough ===
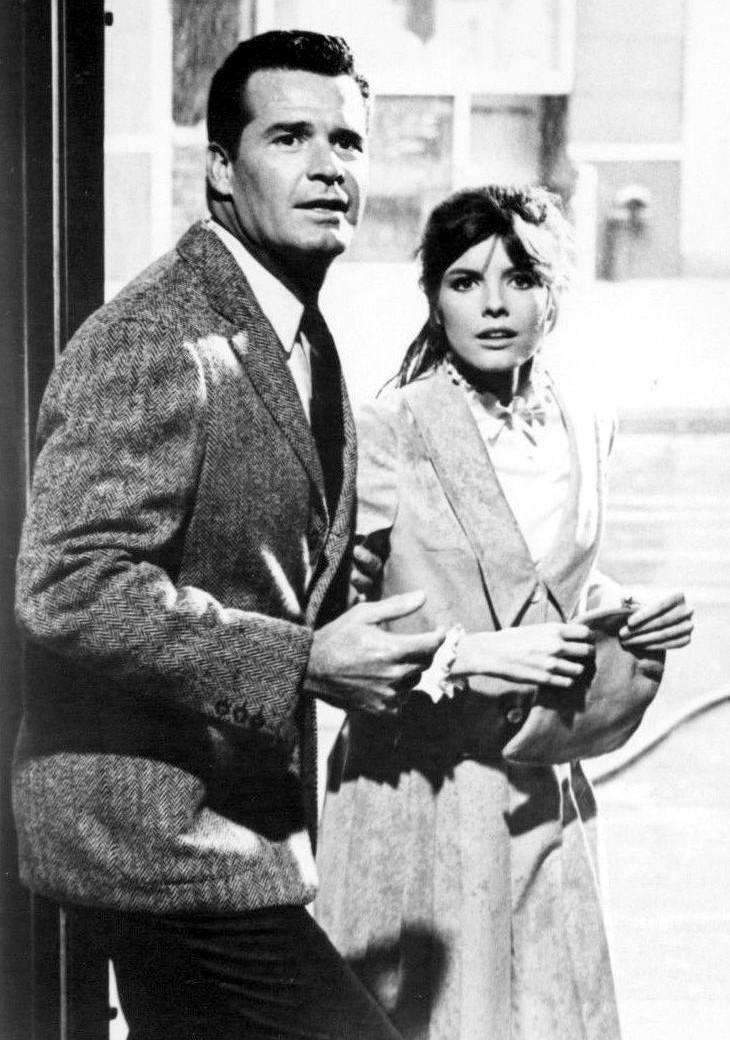
With James Garner in Mister Buddwing (1966)

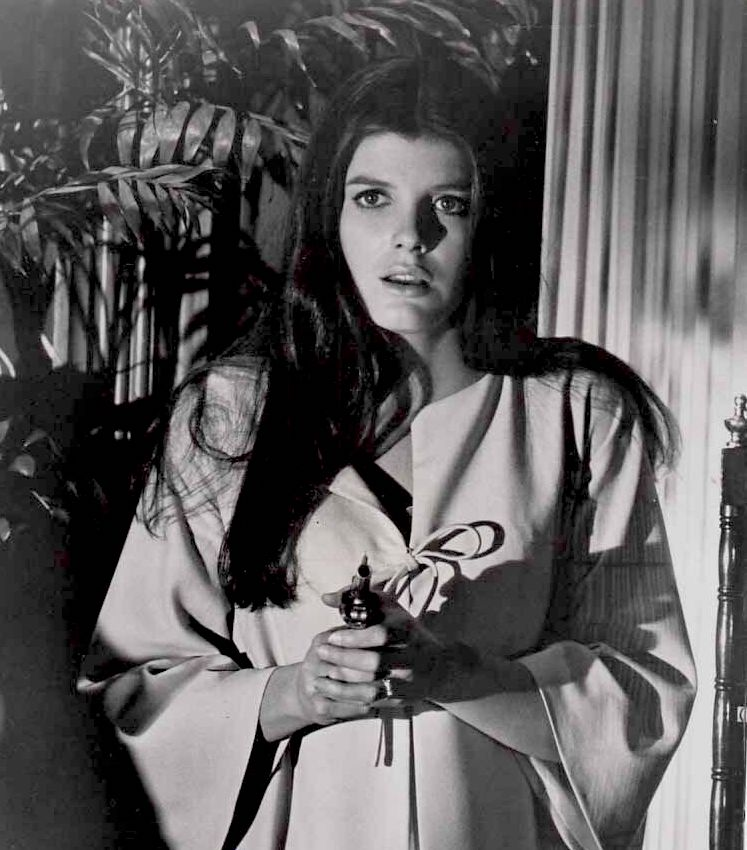
In Games (1967)

At Universal, Ross starred in a television film with Doug McClure, The Longest Hundred Miles (1967), then co-starred in Curtis Harrington's psychological thriller, Games (1967) with Simone Signoret and James Caan, which she later called "terrible".

Ross's breakthrough role was as Elaine Robinson in Mike Nichols's comedy-drama The Graduate (1967), opposite Dustin Hoffman and Anne Bancroft. Ross was only eight years younger than Bancroft, who played her mother in the film. She had been recommended to director Nichols by Signoret. This part, in which Ross plays a young woman who elopes with a young man who had an affair with her mother, earned Ross an Oscar nomination for Best Supporting Actress, and won her a Golden Globe Award as New Star of the Year. Commenting on her critical accolades at the time, Ross said, "I'm not a movie star... that system is dying and I'd like to help it along."

She later said at this time, "I got sent everything in town, but Universal wouldn't loan me out." After eight months, she was in Hellfighters (1968) playing John Wayne's daughter, who romances Jim Hutton.

Ross was cast as a Native American woman in Universal's Western film Tell Them Willie Boy Is Here (1969), starring Robert Redford. In August 1968, she signed a new contract with Universal to make two films a year for seven years. She refused several roles (including Jacqueline Bisset's role in Bullitt) before accepting the part of Etta Place in Butch Cassidy and the Sundance Kid (1969), co-starring Paul Newman and Robert Redford, which was another massive commercial hit. She was paid $175,000 for her performance in the film. For her roles in both Tell Them Willie Boy is Here and Butch Cassidy and the Sundance Kid, Ross won the BAFTA Award for Best Actress.

She was dropped by Universal in the spring of 1969 for refusing to play a stewardess in Airport starring Burt Lancaster and Dean Martin, another role that went to Jacqueline Bisset. Because of this, she later lost out to Tuesday Weld on a film she greatly desired to do, the adaptation of Joan Didion's novel Play It as It Lays, because it was a Universal production. Instead, she had a starring role in the drama Fools (1970) opposite Jason Robards.

=== Semi-retirement and comeback ===
Ross dropped out of Hollywood for a while in 1969 after marrying cinematographer Conrad Hall. She occasionally acted, appearing in Get to Know Your Rabbit (1972), They Only Kill Their Masters (1972), which reunited her with James Garner, and Chance and Violence (1974) with Yves Montand. She refused several more roles, including a part in 1974 film The Towering Inferno.

Preferring stage acting, Ross returned to the small playhouses in Los Angeles for much of the 1970s. "I'm aware that I have the reputation for being difficult", she later said.

One of her best-known roles came in the 1975 film The Stepford Wives, for which she won the Saturn Award for Best Actress.

She reprised the role of Etta Place in a 1976 ABC television film, Wanted: The Sundance Woman, a sequel to Butch Cassidy and the Sundance Kid. Ross subsequently appeared in the drama film Voyage of the Damned (1977) about a doomed ocean liner carrying Jewish refugees from Nazi Germany, which earned her a second Golden Globe Award for Best Supporting Actress. She was also in The Betsy (1978) and the disaster film The Swarm (1978). Next, Ross co-starred opposite Sam Elliott in the supernatural horror film The Legacy (1978), playing a woman who finds herself subject to an ancestral curse at an English estate. Ross had previously worked with Elliott on Butch Cassidy and the Sundance Kid.

=== Television ===
From 1979, Ross starred in several television movies, including Murder by Natural Causes in 1979 with Hal Holbrook, Barry Bostwick and Richard Anderson, Rodeo Girl in 1980, Murder in Texas (1981) and Marian Rose White (1982). She had a supporting role in The Final Countdown (1980) and Wrong Is Right (1982), but focused largely on television films: The Shadow Riders (1982), a remake of Wait Until Dark (1983), Travis McGee (1982) with Elliott, Secrets of a Mother and Daughter (1983), Red Headed Stranger (1986), and Houston: The Legend of Texas (1986) with Elliott.

She had a role in the 1980s television series The Colbys opposite Charlton Heston as Francesca Scott Colby, mother of Dynasty crossover character Jeff Colby.

=== Later career ===
Ross co-wrote the teleplay and starred in Conagher (1991) alongside husband Sam Elliott and was in A Climate for Killing (1991), and Home Before Dark (1997).

She played Donnie's therapist in the 2001 cult classic Donnie Darko. She was in Don't Let Go (2002), and Capital City (2004) and played Carly Schroeder's grandmother in the 2006 independent film Eye of the Dolphin. She was also in Slip, Tumble & Slide (2015).

In January 2015, she appeared at the Malibu Playhouse in the first of a series titled A Conversation With, interviewed by Steven Gaydos. That February, she again co-starred with Sam Elliott in Love Letters, also at the Malibu Playhouse.

In 2017, she appeared as Sam Elliott's former wife in The Hero, in which he played an aging Western star.

== Personal life ==
Ross has married five times. On February 28, 1960, she married her college sweetheart, Joel Fabiani. The marriage lasted two years before ending in divorce.

She married her second husband John Marion in 1964. They divorced in 1967.

After completing Butch Cassidy and the Sundance Kid, Ross married the film's cinematographer, Conrad Hall, in 1969. They divorced in 1973.

Ross married Gaetano "Tom" Lisi in 1974 after making The Stepford Wives; they met when he was a chauffeur and technician on the set. They divorced in 1979.

Ross married Sam Elliott on May 1, 1984. They had worked together on Butch Cassidy and the Sundance Kid, and began dating in 1978 after they were reacquainted on the set of The Legacy. On September 17, 1984, four months after her marriage to Elliott and four months before turning 45, Ross gave birth to a daughter, Cleo Rose Elliott.

In 2011, Ross filed a restraining order against her daughter after the latter allegedly attacked her with a pair of scissors. Ross stated in a court document that her daughter has had violent episodes since childhood.

== Accolades ==
Year	Institution	Category	Nominated work(s)	Result	Ref.
1967	Academy Awards	Best Supporting Actress	The Graduate	Nominated	
1969	British Academy Film Awards	Most Promising Newcomer to Leading Film Roles	The Graduate	Nominated	
1971	British Academy Film Awards	Best Actress in a Leading Role	Butch Cassidy and the Sundance Kid & Tell Them Willie Boy Is Here	Won	
1967	Golden Globe Awards	New Star of the Year – Actress	The Graduate	Won	
1976	Golden Globe Awards	Best Supporting Actress – Motion Picture	Voyage of the Damned	Won	
1967	Laurel Awards	Best Supporting Actress	The Graduate	Won	
1975	Saturn Awards	Best Actress	The Stepford Wives	Won	

== Sources ==
- Andreychuk, Ed (1997). The Golden Corral: A Roundup of Magnificent Western Films. McFarland. ISBN 0-7864-0393-4.
- Monaco, James (1991). The Encyclopedia of Film. Perigree Books. ISBN 978-0-399-51604-7.
