= Inauguration of the Pleasure Dome =

1954 film by Kenneth Anger

- Directed by: Kenneth Anger
- Starring: Samson De Brier; Marjorie Cameron; Joan Whitney; Anaïs Nin; Curtis Harrington
- Music by: Leoš Janáček (Glagolitic Mass) (1954 and 1966 versions); Jeff Lynne (Eldorado by Electric Light Orchestra) (1978 version)
- Distributed by: Mystic Fire Video (DVD)
- Release date: 1954
- Running time: 38 mins (original version; two other versions exist)
- Country: United States

Inauguration of the Pleasure Dome is a 38-minute avant-garde short film by Kenneth Anger. It was filmed in December 1953 and completed in 1954. Anger created two other versions of this film in 1966 and the late 1970s. The film has gained cult film status.

== Production ==
According to Anger, the film takes the name "pleasure dome" from Samuel Taylor Coleridge's 1816 poem "Kubla Khan". Anger was inspired to make the film after attending a Halloween party called "Come as your Madness" hosted by artist and Thelemite Renate Druks.

== Versions ==
Earlier prints of the film had sequences that were meant to be projected on three different screens, an idea inspired in part by Abel Gance's 1927 film Napoléon. Anger subsequently re-edited the film to layer the images. The differences in the visuals of the 1954 original and the two revisions are minor. An early version—shown only once on West German television in the early 1980s, and held to this day by Norddeutscher Rundfunk—includes an additional three minutes at the beginning, including a reading of "Kubla Khan".

The original edition soundtrack is a complete performance of Leoš Janáček's Glagolitic Mass. In 1966, a re-edited version known as 'The Sacred Mushroom Edition' was made available. In the late 1970s, a third revision was made, which was 'The Sacred Mushroom Edition' re-edited to fit the 1974 Electric Light Orchestra album Eldorado (with the exception of "Illusions in G Major", which Anger felt did not fit the mood of the film).

== Content ==
The film reflects Anger's deep interest in Thelema, the philosophy of Aleister Crowley and his followers, as indicated by Marjorie Cameron's role as "The Scarlet Woman" (an honorific Crowley bestowed on certain important magical partners). Crowley's concept of a ritual masquerade party where attendees dress as gods and goddesses served as a direct inspiration for the film. The film uses some footage of the Hell sequence from the 1911 Italian silent film L'Inferno. Near the end, scenes from Anger's 1949 film Puce Moment are interpolated into the layered images and faces.

== Release and reception ==
The film was screened at the Coronet in Los Angeles in 1954. The three-screen version was shown at Expo 58. In 1958, it won the Prix de l'Âge d'or in Brussels. The film (primarily in the second or third version) was often shown in American universities and art galleries during the 1960s, 1970s and 1980s.

== Cast ==
- Samson De Brier as Shiva, Osiris, Nero, Alessandro Cagliostro, and Aleister Crowley (credited as "The Great Beast 666")
- Marjorie Cameron as the scarlet woman and Babalon
- Joan Whitney as Aphrodite
- Katy Kadell as Isis
- Renate Druks as Lilith
- Anaïs Nin as Astarte
- Curtis Harrington as Cesare the sleepwalker
- Kenneth Anger as Hecate
- Paul Mathison as Pan
- Peter Loomer as Ganymede

== See also ==
- List of avant-garde films of the 1950s
