= Max Myers =

British file director, screenwriter, novelist

- Myers in 2026. British screenwriter, film director, author and songwriter.
- Born: Iserlohn, Germany
- Occupations: Film director; screenwriter; novelist
- Years active: 1999–present
- Notable work: Don't Let Go; Boysie Blake Problem Solver (novel); Irish Jam

Max Myers is a British film director, screenwriter and novelist who has been active in Los Angeles since 1998.

His first feature film, Don't Let Go, won the Outstanding Directorial Achievement award at the 2002 Stony Brook Film Festival in New York, the Best Picture Award at the Westchester Film Festival (NY) and a Prism Award in Los Angeles.

He was the writer of the feature film Irish Jam starring comedian Eddie Griffin and Anna Friel and has written a handful of violent crime novels including the award-winning, Boysie Blake Problem Solver.

The son of a German woman and an English Army sergeant, Myers was born in Iserlohn, Germany and lived in a large number of postings during his youth including South Australia and Gibraltar and eventually ended up in East London where he was an amateur boxer and musician through his teens, then began working as a tour manager and sound mixer for European bands that included famous musicians from Manfred Mann, Mungo Jerry, Berlin Rock Ensemble, Moonraker and Wings (band).

== Filmography ==
Feature films

- "Don't Let Go" (2002) - writer, director
- "Irish Jam" (2006)
- "Slip Tumble & Slide" (2010) - writer director

Short films

- "The Test Of Time" (2015) writer

== Bibliography ==
- "Boysie Blake" (2014) - crime, suspense novel
