= Curtis Harrington =

American film and television director (1926–2007)

- Harrington, c. 1950
- Born: Gene Curtis Harrington; September 17, 1926; Los Angeles, California, U.S.
- Died: May 6, 2007 (aged 80); Los Angeles, California, U.S.
- Resting place: Hollywood Forever Cemetery
- Other name: John Sebastian
- Education: Occidental College; University of Southern California; University of California, Los Angeles
- Occupations: Director, screenwriter, producer, actor

Gene Curtis Harrington (September 17, 1926 – May 6, 2007) was an American film and television director, screenwriter, producer, and occasional actor. He emerged in the experimental film scene of the 1940s and ‘50s, notably as a collaborator of Kenneth Anger, before becoming a director of mainstream horror films and television series.

The Harvard Film Archive referred to Harrington as “among the most wholly original directors to work in the Hollywood studio system,” and Screen Slate called him "a cinematic jack of all trades." He is also considered one of the forerunners to New Queer Cinema.

== Early life and education ==
Harrington was born on September 17, 1926, in Los Angeles, the son of Isabel (Dorum) and Raymond Stephen Harrington, and grew up in Beaumont, California. His first cinematic endeavors were amateur films he made while still a teenager. At age 16, in 1942, he directed and co-starred in a short version of Edgar Allan Poe's The Fall of the House of Usher.

Harrington attended Occidental College and the University of Southern California, then graduated from the University of California, Los Angeles, with a degree in film studies.

== Career ==
=== Experimental filmmaker ===
He began his career as a film critic, writing a book on Josef von Sternberg in 1948. An early protege of Maya Deren, he directed several avant-garde short films in the 1940s and 1950s, including Fragment of Seeking, Picnic, and The Wormwood Star (a film study of the artwork of Marjorie Cameron which was filmed at the home of multi-millionaire art collector Edward James). Cameron also co-starred in his subsequent film Night Tide (1961) with Dennis Hopper. Harrington worked with Kenneth Anger, serving as a cinematographer on Anger's Puce Moment and acting in Inauguration of the Pleasure Dome (1954) (he played Cesare, the somnambulist).

Harrington had links to Thelema shared with his close associates Kenneth Anger and Marjorie Cameron who frequently acted in his films.

=== Horror films ===
During the 1950s, Harrington began working as an assistant to producer Jerry Wald. He wrote the story for Wald's 1958 production Mardi Gras, a musical starring Pat Boone. He subsequently worked as an associate producer under Wald on Hound-Dog Man (1959), Return to Peyton Place (1961), and The Stripper (1963).

After leaving Wald, Harrington was employed by Roger Corman, who assigned the burgeoning director two American films which used footage from Soviet science fiction films, Voyage to the Prehistoric Planet (1965) and Queen of Blood (1966). The latter film has developed a cult following, and has been cited as an influence on Alien.

In 1967, Harrington wrote and directed Games for Universal Pictures, a psychological thriller starring Simone Signoret, James Caan, and Katharine Ross. The film earned Signoret a BAFTA Award nomination for Best Actress in a Supporting Role.

He was originally going to direct the 1970 film Wuthering Heights, but he wound up making Whoever Slew Auntie Roo? and What's the Matter with Helen? with Shelley Winters.

Throughout the decade, Harrington directed a string of made-for-television horror and thriller films, including Killer Bees (1974) with Gloria Swanson in one of her later roles. Harrington he made two television movies based on screenplays by Robert Bloch: The Cat Creature (1973) and The Dead Don't Die (1975).

=== Later works ===
Harrington had a cameo in Orson Welles's long-unfinished The Other Side of the Wind. Throughout the 1970s and 1980s, Harrington directed episodes of television series such as Baretta, Dynasty, Wonder Woman, The Twilight Zone and Charlie's Angels.

Harrington's final film, the short Usher, is a remake of his earlier Fall of the House of Usher. He cast Nikolas and Zeena Schreck in his updated version of Edgar Allan Poe's story. Financing of the film was partly accomplished through the Shrecks' brokering of the sale of Harrington's signed copy of Crowley's The Book of Thoth.

The Academy Film Archive has preserved several of Curtis Harrington's films, including Night Tide, On the Edge, and Picnic.

== Other activities ==
Harrington was the driving force in rediscovering the original James Whale version of The Old Dark House (1932, Universal Pictures). Although the rights to the original story had been sold to Columbia Pictures for a remake, he persuaded George Eastman House to preserve it. On the Kino International DVD, there is a filmed interview of Harrington's explaining why and how this came about (the contract stipulated that they were allowed to save the film only, not release it, essentially to prove that there was no profit motive).

Harrington was an advisor on Bill Condon's Gods and Monsters (1998), about the last days of director James Whale, as Harrington had known Whale at the end of his life. Harrington also has a cameo in the film.

== Personal life ==
Harrington was openly gay. He wrote in his autobiography that he had his first sexual experience with another male (a football player) in high school.

=== Death ===
Harrington died on May 6, 2007, aged 80, of complications from a stroke he suffered two years earlier. His remains are interred in the Cathedral Mausoleum at the Hollywood Forever Cemetery.

== Legacy ==
House of Harrington, a short documentary about the director's life, was released in 2008. It was directed by Jeffrey Schwarz and Tyler Hubby and filmed several years before Harrington's death. It includes footage of his high school film Fall of the House of Usher.

Harrington's memoir Nice Guys Don't Work in Hollywood was published posthumously in 2013 by Drag City.

== Filmography ==
=== Film ===
==== Feature films ====
Year	Title	Functioned as			Notes
Year	Title	Director	Writer	Producer	Notes
1958	Mardi Gras	No	Story	No	
1959	Hound-Dog Man	No	No	Associate	
1961	Return to Peyton Place	No	No	Associate	
1961	Night Tide	Yes	Yes	No	Directorial debut
1963	The Stripper	No	No	Associate	
1965	Voyage to the Prehistoric Planet	Yes	Yes	No	Credited as 'John Sebastian'
1966	Queen of Blood	Yes	Yes	No	
1967	Games	Yes	No	No	
1971	What's the Matter with Helen?	Yes	No	No	
1971	Whoever Slew Auntie Roo?	Yes	No	No	
1973	The Killing Kind	Yes	No	No	
1977	Ruby	Yes	No	No	
1985	Mata Hari	Yes	No	No	

==== Short films ====
Year	Title	Functioned as				Notes
Year	Title	Director	Writer	Producer	Other	Notes
1942	Fall of the House of Usher	Yes	No	No	No	
1946	Fragment of Seeking	Yes	No	No	Yes	Starred as main character
1948	Picnic	Yes	No	No	No	
1949	Puce Moment	No	No	No	Yes	As cinematographer
1949	On the Edge	Yes	No	No	No	
1952	The Assignation	Yes	Yes	Yes	Yes	Also editor
1952	Dangerous Houses	Yes	No	No	No	Unreleased
1952	St. Tropaz	Yes	No	No	No	Unfinished
1956	The Wormwood Star	Yes	Yes	Yes	Yes	Also editor
1966	The Four Elements	Yes	Yes	No	No	Industrial short
2000	Usher	Yes	Yes	No	No	
2008	Man of the Crowd	No	Yes	No	No	

=== Television ===
==== TV series ====
Year	Title	Notes
1966	The Legend of Jesse James	2 episodes
1975–76	Baretta	2 episodes
1977	Quinn Martin's Tales of the Unexpected	Episode: "A Hand For Sonny Blue"
1978	Lucan	Episode: "Pariah"
1978	Sword of Justice	Episode: "The Destructors"
1978	Logan's Run	Episode: "Stargate"
1978	Vega$	Episode: "Kill Dan Tanna!"
1978–79	Charlie's Angels	2 episodes
1979	Wonder Woman	Episode: "A Date with Doomsday"
1981	Darkroom	2 episodes
1983–84	Hotel	2 episodes
1984	Glitter	Episode: "A Minor Miracle"
1983–85	Dynasty	6 episodes
1985–87	The Colbys	5 episodes
1987	The Twilight Zone	Episode: "Voices in the Earth"

==== TV films and miniseries ====
Year	Title
1970	How Awful About Allan
1973	The Cat Creature
1974	Killer Bees
1975	The Dead Don't Die
1978	Devil Dog: The Hound of Hell

=== Acting roles ===
==== Film ====
Year	Title	Role	Notes
1942	The Fall of the House of Usher	Roderick Usher / Madeline Usher	
1946	Fragment of Seeking	Man Wearing Glasses	Uncredited
1958	Inauguration of the Pleasure Dome	Cesare	
1998	Gods and Monsters	Party Guest	Uncredited
2000	Usher	Roderick Usher / Madeline Usher	
2002	My Life with Buk	Joe	
2018	The Other Side of the Wind	Himself	Filmed between 1970–76

==== Television ====
Year	Title	Role	Notes
1967	Ironside	Ed Harris	Episode: "Let My Brother Go"; Credited as 'John Sebastian'
