= The Mutiny of the Elsinore =

The Mutiny of the Elisnore may refer to:

- The Mutiny of the Elsinore (novel), a 1914 novel by Jack London
  - The Mutiny of the Elisnore (1920 film), an American silent film adaptation
  - Les mutinés de l'Elseneur, a 1936 French film adaptation
  - The Mutiny of the Elsinore (1937 film), a British film adaptation directed by Roy Lockwood
