= Queen of Blood =

1966 film by Curtis Harrington

- Theatrical release insert poster
- Directed by: Curtis Harrington
- Screenplay by: Curtis Harrington
- Based on: A Dream Come True by: Mikhail Karyukov; and Otar Koberidze
- Produced by: George Edwards
- Starring: John Saxon; Basil Rathbone; Judi Meredith; Dennis Hopper
- Cinematography: Vilis Lapenieks
- Edited by: Leo H. Shreve
- Music by: Leonard Morand
- Production company: Cinema West Productions
- Distributed by: American International Pictures
- Release date: March 1966
- Running time: 81 minutes
- Country: United States
- Language: English
- Budget: $65,000
- Box office: $17.3 million (as at 1 Oct 1966)

Queen of Blood (also known as Planet of Blood) is a 1966 American science-fiction horror film written and directed by Curtis Harrington and starring John Saxon, Basil Rathbone, Dennis Hopper, Judi Meredith, and Florence Marly. The film is based on the screenplay for the earlier Soviet feature film Mechte Navstrechu (A Dream Come True). Director Harrington also reused special effects footage from that film, as well as footage from the Soviet science fiction film Nebo Zovyot.

In the film, an alien species contacts Earth, saying that they are journeying across the galaxy to make formal contact with humanity. Their interstellar starship crashes on Mars, and an Earth ship is dispatched to attempt a rescue. On Mars, humans locate the downed spacecraft, but only a single dead alien humanoid is found aboard. They determine that an alien rescue shuttle left the Red Planet but crashed on nearby Phobos. A strange, green-skinned woman is found alive aboard the shuttle's wreck. As they head back to Earth, the crew begins to die, drained of their blood.

Queen of Blood was released by American International Pictures in March 1966, on a double bill with Jack Hill's Blood Bath. Some critics have noted the film's influence on Ridley Scott's Alien (1979).

== Plot ==
In the year 1990, space travel is well-established, humans having had landed on the Moon twenty years earlier. At the International Institute of Space Technology, communications expert and astronaut Laura James monitors strange signals being received from outer space. Laura's superior, Dr. Farraday, translates the signal and discovers that it is from an alien race, who are sending an ambassador to Earth. Soon after, however, Laura receives a video log showing that the aliens' starship has crash-landed on Mars.

The Institute launches a rescue mission aboard the spaceship Oceano, which includes Laura and astronauts Anders Brockman and Paul Grant. Oceano travels through a solar flare, suffering some damage, before completing the journey to Mars and locating the downed alien craft. Anders and Paul investigate and discover a single dead alien aboard. Faraday deduces that the surviving crew may have been rescued, so an observation satellite will be needed to locate the alien rescue ship. Laura's fiancé Allan and fellow astronaut Tony volunteer. They travel on the spaceship Meteor to Phobos, one of the two moons of Mars, where they launch the observation satellite. Tony finds an alien spaceship on Phobos. He and Allan are able to enter, finding an unconscious but still-living female alien. As their rescue ship holds only two, one of them must stay behind, so they toss a coin, and Tony stays.

Allan and the female alien arrive on Oceano, joining Laura, Paul and Anders. The alien regains consciousness and smiles at the three men, but not Laura. The alien refuses to eat all food offered and will not let Anders take a blood sample. That night, as Paul is guarding the alien, she attacks and kills him, draining his blood after first hypnotizing him. The surviving astronauts decide to keep her alive by feeding her blood from the ship's plasma supply. When this supply runs out, she kills Anders and feeds on him, leaving Laura and Allan the only humans aboard.

The alien then attacks Allan, but Laura interrupts her before she can kill again. Laura scratches her in the struggle, and the alien screams in terror, quickly bleeding to death. Laura and Allen then find alien eggs hidden aboard. Allan hypothesizes that she was royalty, likely a queen (assuming human-like inbreeding among royalty, hence her hemophilia), and was being sent to Earth in order to breed. Their spaceship lands safely, but Earth authorities decide to study the alien eggs rather than destroying them outright, as Allan has urged.

== Cast ==
- John Saxon as Allan Brenner
- Basil Rathbone as Dr. Farraday
- Judi Meredith as Laura James
- Dennis Hopper as Paul Grant
- Florence Marly as Alien Queen
- Robert Boon as Anders Brockman
- Don Eitner as Tony Barrata
- Forrest J Ackerman as Farraday's Aide

== Production ==
=== Development ===
Harrington had made his name with the feature Night Tide, which impressed Roger Corman enough to offer the director a film project. "Of course, I would like to do a more individual film than Queen of Blood", said Harrington at the time, "but I can't get the financing. However, the film is entertaining, and I feel I was able to say something within the context of the genre". Harrington says "Roger paid for the whole thing" and "it was a personal, private Roger Corman production".

Queen of Blood was made using special effects from the Soviet films Mechte Navstrechu (A Dream Come True) and Nebo Zovyot (previously re-edited by Corman into Battle Beyond the Sun). Harrington made Queen of Blood back-to-back with Voyage to the Prehistoric Planet, which also incorporated footage from the Soviet films. Both Harrington films starred Basil Rathbone. However, Queen of Blood was an original story by Harrington, whereas Voyage was mostly the original Russian film with some scenes added.

Harrington says that Corman "wanted me to write a completely new framing story to use all the technical footage of a rocket flying through outer space, landing on another planet and all that. I then proceeded to write a script and created the idea of an outer space vampire-like creature." Harrington estimated that 70% of the film was his; many years later he said that it was 90%.

Harrington hired George Edwards to act as line producer. The director met Edwards when the latter produced a stage production of Tennessee Williams' The Garden District. They collaborated well together and would go on to have a long professional relationship. Harrington called Edwards "the kind of producer who had an uncanny ability to anticipate the needs of a director. He had a wonderful sense of humor, which enabled him to deal equally with the temperament of stars and the vagaries of writers."

Corman's name does not appear on the final film. Harrington says that this is because Queen of Blood was made with a non-union crew, and Corman had signed a contract to work with the unions.

Harrington says that A Dream Come True was about a queen from another planet. He wanted to do a film about a vampire in outer space and had to make her female to match the Russian footage.

=== Casting ===
Czech actor Florence Marly was a personal friend of Harrington. He later said that he had to fight with Roger Corman in order to hire her "because she was an older woman. I'm sure he had some bimbo in mind, you know? So I fought for Marley because I felt she had the required exotic quality that would work in the role." Harrington wrote that if he had cast "a sexy young floozy in the part ... it would have become just another run-of-the-mill sci-fi exploitation film. Fortunately, I won Roger over to my cause, perhaps because I was so determined and enthusiastic. I turned out to be right in my hunch. Florence was wonderful in the nonspeaking part—eerie, intense, and otherworldly."

Harrington also said that Dennis Hopper, who had been in Night Tide "was like a part of my little team by then", so he also agreed to appear in the movie. He said that star John Saxon "conveyed sincerity and kindness".

=== Filming ===
The film was shot at Major Studios in downtown Los Angeles, shortly before they were bought by Robert Aldrich. Curtis recalled: "we were shooting long, long hours, non union, fending off union representatives who had found out where we were and were threatening us and everything".

John Saxon later claimed that Gene Corman had more to do with Queen of Blood than Roger. Saxon estimated that his scenes were shot in seven to eight days and that Dennis Hopper "was trying very hard to keep a straight face throughout" during the making of the film. He added in another interview: "I took it seriously, at least while on camera; Dennis had a hard time doing even that."

Harrington said that the film was shot in six days. He was able to do this because the shoot was non-union, meaning that the crew would work long hours, sometimes until two in the morning. He says that two set designers recommended by Roger Corman failed to prepare the set properly in time.

"Basil Rathbone had one day (on the set)", added Saxon. "He came on and he was a very, very distinguished gentleman. He did his scene. But he got annoyed, because they didn't get the sound right on his first take, and they asked him to come back. He dressed down the director."

Basil Rathbone was paid $1,500 to act for a day and a half on Queen of Blood, and $1,500 for half a day on Voyage to the Prehistoric Planet (1965), another film that incorporated Soviet film footage.

Rathbone ended up working overtime and missed a meal. The Screen Actors Guild demanded overtime pay, plus a fine for the meal violation, but producer George Edwards produced footage showing that the delay was because Rathbone had not memorized all his lines and insisted on skipping lunch. Harrington recalled Rathbone as "a great pro who regaled me of stories of Hollywood in the few minutes here and there between set ups".

Harrington says that the sets were not ready on the first day of filming because "Roger had hired a bunch of hippies as set decorators and they were stoned all the time".

In the film the space vampire paralyzes her victims with her glowing eyes, and late in the film she appears to direct a kind of "heat vision" from her eyes to burn through a rope that has been used to confine her. The effect of the vampire's glowing eyes was one of the most striking elements of the film; Harrington told an interviewer that they achieved the effect on set by directing pencil-thin beams of light into Florence Marly's eyes.

Stephanie Rothman assisted on the film; she had also worked with Corman and Harrington on Voyage to the Prehistoric Planet. "Curtis was very cordial, and I enjoyed watching him work and, you know, I learned something from watching how he functioned on the set, and how the production went along," said Rothman. "He was comfortable having me there and I was grateful to be there to learn from him."

According to one account, the budget for this and Voyage to the Prehistoric Planet came to $33,052. Another said the films cost $65,000. Harrington has said that they cost $60,000, then $50,000, though he admits to not being sure.

== Release ==
Queen of Blood was released in the United States by American International Pictures in March 1966, as a double feature with Blood Bath.

Even before the release, its quality was sufficient for Universal to hire Harrington and producer George Edwards to make the feature film Games. Harrington says that Queen of Blood had particularly impressed Ned Tanen.

Harrington says that Roger Corman promised him a $1,000 bonus if the film went into profit, and the producer honored this, albeit after some prompting.

On December 1, 2003, Queen of Blood was featured at the Sitges Film Festival in Spain.

== Reception ==
In her review of a double bill with the feature Three in the Attic, Renata Adler of The New York Times called Queen of Blood the livelier of the two films.

Director Harrington felt that Ridley Scott's Alien (1979) must have received some inspiration from his earlier feature, saying: "Ridley's film is like a greatly enhanced, expensive and elaborate version of Queen of Blood". He later elaborated: "Some years later, it was very flattering to realize that I had created the prototype for a whole series of science-fiction movies dealing with monstrous creatures from outer space."

== Novelization ==
A novelization of Harrington's original screenplay was written by pulp writer Charles Nuetzel. The biography about Forrest J. Ackerman erroneously suggests that Harrington based his original screenplay on a book by Nuetzel. The novel is back in print as an ebook available online.

== Sequel ==
Florence Marly made a 16 mm sequel to Queen of Blood titled Space Boy! Night, Neal and Ness in 1973.

== See also ==
- List of American films of 1966

== Sources ==
- Bell, Douglas (2007). An Oral History with Curtis Harrington. Academy Foundation.
- Harrington, Curtis (2013). Nice Guys Don't Work in Hollywood : The Adventures of An Aesthete in the Movie Business. Drag City. ISBN 9781937112073.
