= Confession at Dawn =

1954 film

- Directed by: Pierre Chenal
- Written by: María Elena Gertner; Reinaldo Lomboy; David Phillips
- Starring: Florence Marly; Pepe Rojas; Lautaro Murúa
- Cinematography: Andrés Martorell De Llanza
- Music by: Acario Cotapos; Alfonso Letelier; Juan Orrego Salas
- Production company: Amero Film
- Release date: 20 May 1954
- Running time: 80 minutes
- Countries: Argentina; Chile
- Language: Spanish

Confession at Dawn (Spanish: Confesiones al amanecer) is a 1954 Argentine-Chilean drama film of the classical era of Argentine cinema, directed by Pierre Chenal and starring Florence Marly, Pepe Rojas and Lautaro Murúa.

== Cast ==
- Florence Marly
- Ricardo Mendoza
- Pepe Rojas
- Lautaro Murúa
- María Elena Aliberthi
- Carmen Bunster
- Yvette Espinoza
- Delfina Fuentes
- Anna María Gómez
- Chita Marchant
- Emilio Martinez
- David Phillips
- Ernst Uthoff

== Bibliography ==
- Navarro, Julio López. Películas chilenas. Editorial La Noria, 1994.
- Plazaola, Luis Trelles. South American Cinema: Dictionary of Film Makers. La Editorial, UPR, 1989.
