= Battle Beyond the Sun =

1959 science fiction film

- US theatrical release poster
- Nebo Zovyot
- Directed by: Mikhail Karyukov; Aleksandr Kozyr; Francis Ford Coppola (additional sequences US version)
- Written by: Mikhail Karyhukov, Yevgeni Pomeshchikov; Aleksei Sazonov
- Produced by: Roger Corman (US version)
- Starring: Aleksandr Shvorin; Ivan Pereverzhev
- Cinematography: Nikolai Kulchitsky; Jack Hill (add. sequences US version)
- Edited by: L. Mkhitaryyanch
- Music by: Yuli Meitus, performed by Vyacheslav Mescherin; Carmine Coppola (US version)
- Production company: Dovzhenko Film Studios
- Distributed by: Filmgroup (US)
- Release dates: 1959 (USSR); 1962 (US)
- Running time: 64 minutes (US)
- Country: United States
- Languages: Russian, English

The film

Battle Beyond the Sun is a 1962 science fiction film. It is an English-dubbed and re-edited American version of Nebo Zovyot, a 1959 Soviet science fiction film. Roger Corman acquired the Soviet film for U.S. distribution and hired a young film-school student named Francis Ford Coppola to "Americanize" it.

Like the original Soviet Nebo Zovyot, Battle Beyond the Sun is a tale of a "space race" between two nations competing to become the first to land a spacecraft on the planet Mars; unlike the original, in which the competing nations are the USSR and the US, Battle Beyond the Sun focuses on the fictional future countries of North Hemis and South Hemis. The names of not only the Soviet characters, but also their performers, and the crew credits as well, were altered on the screen to American-sounding names in order to further disguise the film's origins: thus Soviet stars Aleksandr Shvorin and Ivan Pereverzev became "Andy Stewart" and "Edd Perry", and Soviet directors Mikhail Karyukov and Aleksandr Kozyr became "Maurice Kaplin" and "Arthur Corwin" – and were demoted to Assistant Director status as well. The advertising and release print's designated director is credited as Thomas Colchart; sources vary as to whom that name actually belongs (Karyukov and/or Kozyr, Coppola, or a hired American dubbing director).

== Production history ==
In addition to preparing a dubbing script free of anti-American propaganda and all references to the USSR and USA, and supervising the dubbing, Francis Ford Coppola slightly re-edited the footage, eliminated the framing "daydream" sequences, and even saw to it that a pastel rhombus shape was matted in on a frame-by-frame basis, to cover the Cyrillic letters CCCP (USSR) which adorned the space station and Soviet rocketships.

Coppola also filmed a few shots of two space monsters fighting and cut them into the Soviet material. According to Jack Hill, who worked on the new version (it was his first paid job for Roger Corman), Coppola's idea was that one monster would look like a penis and the other a vagina. The new monster scenes were shot on a sound stage in Hollywood. Hill and Coppola also shot some footage of the Rose Parade at Pasadena.

== Plot (Russian original) ==
A reporter interviews Dr. Kornev about his work in space travel. While writing his story, the reporter daydreams about such a future. In the daydream, he and others board a rocket that takes them to an orbiting space station. There, he learns the large rocket, the Rodina, is docked at the station. A short while later, an American rocket, the Typhoon, which is ostensibly having mechanical problems, arrives at the space station and is allowed to dock. The Soviet scientists hold a dinner for the visitors. At the dinner, Kornev announces that the Rodina will travel to the planet Mars in a few days, The Americans, Clark and Verst, are taken aback. The Typhoon was secretly prepared to make the first Mars mission. The reckless American authorities order Clark to take the Typhoon to Mars immediately. In their haste to blast off, they injure Somov, the Rodina's pilot. Gordiienko steps in as the new pilot. He and Kornev take off in the Rodina as planned.

Not long after departure, things go wrong aboard Typhoon. Their course is off and they have too little fuel to correct it. Now they are headed for an asteroid belt and if they survive that, a collision course with the sun. Clark radios the Soviets, seeking help. Kornev decides they can help and flies the Rodina to the rescue. Doing so, however, uses too much fuel, so the Rodina must land on the asteroid Icarus where they all at least get a fine view of Mars. A pilotless refueling rocket is sent to Icarus, but crashes. The men on Icarus despair. Verst awakens to see a fifth man on Icarus. It is Somov. He flew another pilotless refueling rocket to Icarus, but since it was not built as a crewed spacecraft, he suffered lethal cosmic radiation and dies. The surviving four are able to blast off and return to a hero's greeting in the Soviet Union.

== Plot (US version) ==
The film opens with a non-sequitur prologue in which a narrator voice explains space flight concepts. Models of space craft "currently under development by the United States Government" are shown in succession. The narrator usefully explains that "the motion picture you are about to see may be called 'a fantasy of the future'."

The time: November 1997. In the "fear-ridden years following the great atomic war", the world has been divided into northern and southern hemispheres. The camera zooms in toward the South Hemis banner. Dr. Albert Gordon and his wife, Dr. Ruth Gordon, currently head the top secret "Project Red Planet" for South Hemis. [The footage seen is from the original Russian-Soviet, with names Anglicized.] A space mission – more re-purposed footage – blasts off for an orbiting space station. The mission docks with the station, delivering the Gordons as well as astronaut Craig Matthews.

South Hemis has been developing the Mercury, a spacecraft which should be able to complete a mission to Mars. Solar and orbital conditions are now favorable. Suddenly, another spacecraft is detected approaching the station. It is from North Hemis. It requests and receives permission to land for emergency repairs. The two North Hemis astronauts – Captain Torrance and his co-pilot Dr. Martin – are treated to dinner by their South Hemis hosts. Dr. Gordon reveals that they are about to commence a flight to Mars. The two North Hemis astronauts decide to end dinner, because "it's getting late".

Captain Torrance confers with his superiors in North Hemis, as he wants to pre-empt the South Hemis flight to Mars with their own mission. Meanwhile, Dr. Martin meets with Dr. Gordon to discuss both missions, but Martin does not divulge any information about the North Hemis plan. Captain Torrance says "I cannot accept defeat" and disconnects from his North Hemis superiors. He joins the meeting between Dr. Martin and Dr. Gordon. Outside in the corridor, Captain Torrance decides to proceed with the flight to Mars, despite Martin warning that their repairs may not hold up. They decide to commandeer their rocketship – the Typhoon – under cover of trying to repair it. They blast off at full power, and Paul Clinton, a South Hemis astronaut, is caught in the rocket back blast and is injured. The Typhoon sets course for Mars.

Paul Clinton is diagnosed with a concussion and cannot go on the Mars mission as planned; he is replaced by Craig Matthews. The Mercury launches. Meanwhile, the Typhoon encounters a meteor storm, and the ship is disabled; its course veers dangerously towards the sun. They send a radio distress signal to the Mercury which locates the Typhoon and eventually intercepts it. Matthews effects an EVA transfer of the two North Hemis astronauts and the Typhoon is abandoned to space.

The Mercury is now low on fuel and cannot reach Mars. Dr. Gordon decides to land on an asteroid, Angkor, which orbits Mars. The ship successfully lands. A vague form lurks in the shadows behind a rock formation: a roaring monster. Meanwhile, back at the space station, the South Hemis superiors decide to send a fuel rocket to Angkor. This will allow the stranded rocket to be re-fuelled and return home. The fuel pod is successfully launched. As it approaches them, Dr. Gordon and his team appear to gain remote control of it, but something interferes with its guidance system and it crashes into the asteroid, exploding.

South Hemis decides to send a second crewed fuel rocket to the asteroid. Astronaut Paul Clinton will pilot the flight. The fuel pod successfully makes the journey and lands on Angkor. Clinton must leave the ship in order to inform Dr. Gordon and his stranded team of his arrival. As he makes his way across the craggy asteroid surface, he encounters two monsters in combat and is incidentally wounded. He struggles onward, but collapses close to the Mercury from which he is seen. Dr. Gordon and his team go out to him, but he dies after telling them where to find the fuel rocket.

The Mercury launches from Angkor. It passes the space station and returns to Earth, landing at an offshore platform. Cheering crowds of people [from more re-purposed Soviet footage] greet them with exuberant admiration. Children present all of them with flowers.

A voice-over announces that, although Dr. Gordon and his team did not make it to Mars, they have set the stage for further exploration of space (most likely under the authority of an eventually unified global government) sometime in the near future.

== Reception ==
The Overlook Film Guide: Science-Fiction remarked: "(One) remains impressed with Corman's cheek and financial astuteness than with the finished film." While recommending the original version, The Encyclopedia of Science Fiction called the Americanized version "butchered".
