= Florence Marly =

Czech actress (1919-1978)

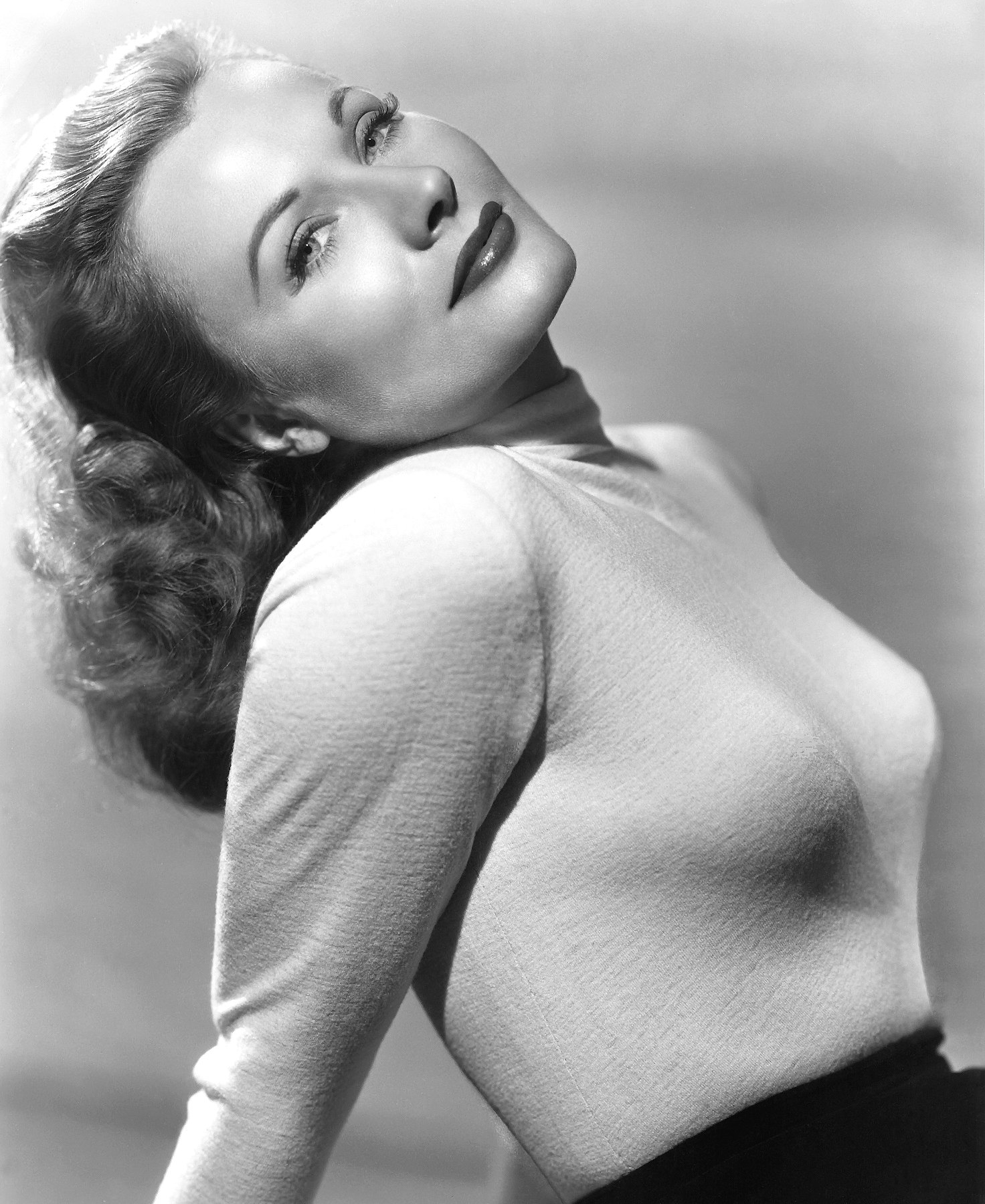
- Marly in a promotion still for Sealed Verdict (1948).
- Born: Hana Smékalová; 2 June 1919; Obrnice, Czechoslovakia (now Czech Republic)
- Died: 9 November 1978 (aged 59); Glendale, California, U.S.
- Education: University of Paris
- Occupation: Actress
- Years active: 1937–1975
- Spouses: Pierre Chenal (1937–1955); Count Degenhart von Wurmbrand-Stuppach (1956)

Florence Marly (born Hana Smékalová; 2 June 1919 – 9 November 1978) was a Czech film actress. She started her career in France, appeared in Argentinian films during World War II, and later worked in the United States.

== Early life and education ==
Marly was born Hana Smékalová in Obrnice, Czechoslovakia. She studied French and her dream was to become an opera singer. At age 18 she went to Paris to study art, literature, and philosophy at Sorbonne.

== Career ==
Marly met her future husband, director Pierre Chenal, who cast her in his film The Alibi in 1937. During World War II, Marly moved to neutral Argentina with her Jewish husband Chenal, where she appeared in several films. She also acted in two of her husband's films while they were in Chile.

After the war, she played a major role in René Clément's Les Maudits, a fictionalized account showing the fate of Nazi refugees. After moving to Hollywood, she acted in Paramount's film Sealed Verdict opposite Ray Milland. Next year, she starred in Stuart Heisler's Tokyo Joe (1949) alongside Humphrey Bogart. In it she played Bogart's wife, who divorces him after he moves to the United States from Japan before Pearl Harbor brought the United States into World War II. The film met with mixed responses from critics. Clive Hirschhorn wrote in his book, The Columbia Story, that it was "a little more than a Bogart parody". Marly's acting in the espionage film Tokyo File 212 brought her appreciations. Robert J. Lentz wrote in Korean War Filmography that she had given the best performance in the film. It was Hollywood's first feature film to be shot entirely in Japan.

In 1962, she appeared in a small role as a gangster's girlfriend in the Twilight Zone episode "Dead Man's Shoes". She had the eponymous role of a blood-thirsty vampire queen in Curtis Harrington-directed science fiction horror film Queen of Blood (1966), novelized by Charles Nuetzel. It met with positive reviews. Paul Meehan wrote in Saucer Movies that she gave a "convincing" performance. Marly made a 16 mm short sequel to Queen of Blood titled Space Boy! (1973).

Her last film role was in The Astrologer (1976), which was infamously lost until 2021.

== Personal life ==
During the early years of her acting career, the U.S. Consulate mistook her for the Russian-born, left-inclined, singer and songwriter Anna Marly, and she was subsequently blacklisted in Hollywood by the House Un-American Activities Committee. Even after she was cleared from the blacklist, at a Hollywood party Jack L. Warner "turned his back on [her]". Noël Coward, in a letter, called her a "rather sweet" "beautiful Czech lady".

At a dinner, director Fritz Lang bit Marly's hand.

She was married to Pierre Chenal from 1937 to 1955. In 1956 she married the Austrian Count Degenhart von Wurmbrand-Stuppach (1893-1965) but divorced him the same year.

=== Death ===
Aged 59, Marly died in Glendale, California on November 9, 1978.

== Filmography ==
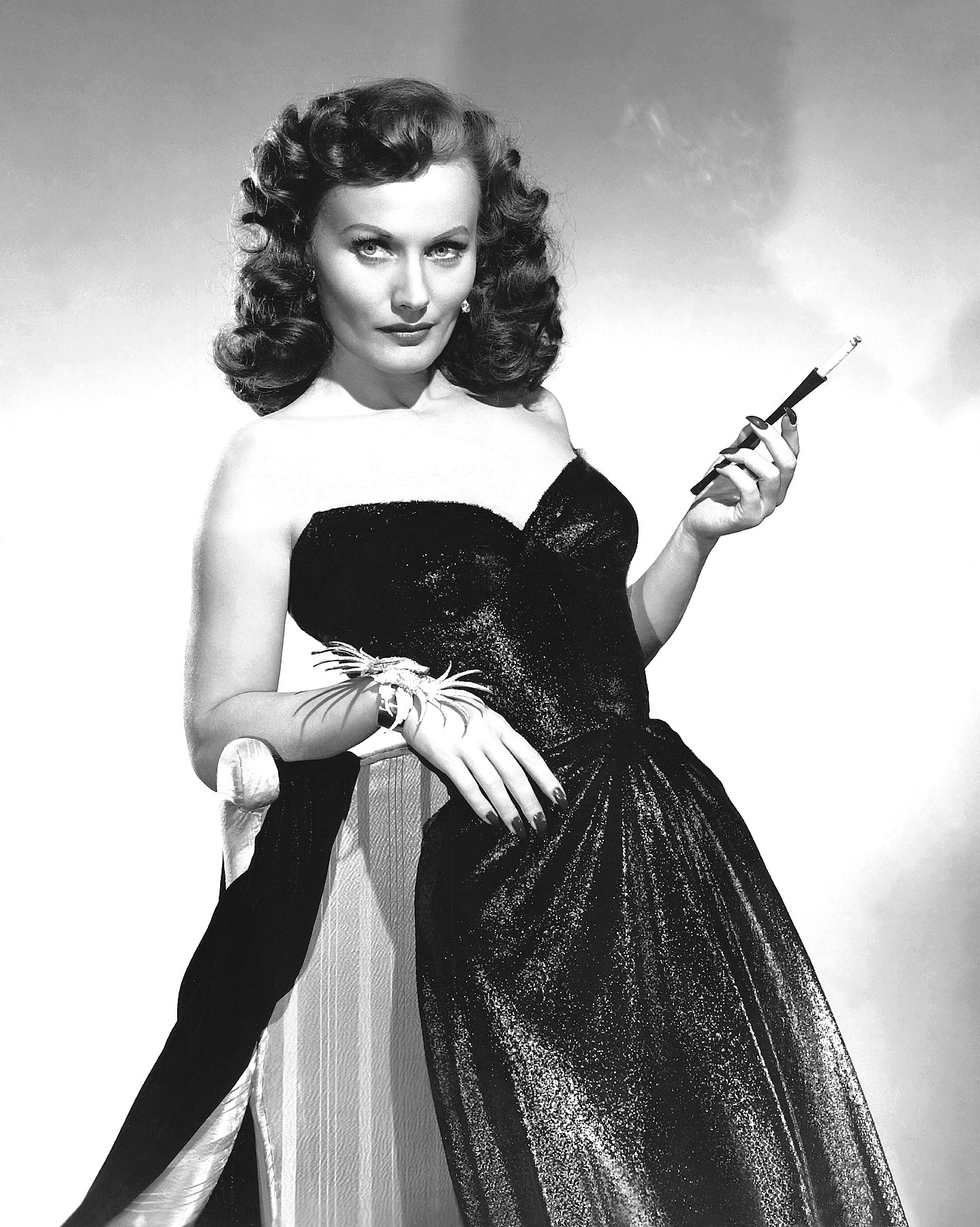
Marly in an advertisement for Tokyo Joe

=== Film ===
Year	Title	Role	Notes	Ref.
1937	The Alibi	Gordon's Mistress		
1938	The Lafarge Case	Emma Pontier		
1938	Café de Paris	Estelle		
1938	Sirocco	Diana		
1939	Savage Brigade	Isa Ostrowski		
1939	The Last Turning	Madge		
1943	La piel de Zapa	Fedora		
1944	End of the Night	Pilar		
1946	Viaje sin regreso	Isabel		
1947	The Damned	Hilde Garosi		
1948	Krakatit	Princess Wilhelmina Hagen		
1948	Sealed Verdict	Themis DeLisle		
1949	Tokyo Joe	Trina Pechinkov Landis		
1951	Tokyo File 212	Steffi Novak		
1952	Gobs and Gals	Soyna DuBois		
1952	The Idol	Cristina Arnaud		
1954	Confession at Dawn			
1957	Undersea Girl	Leila Graham		
1966	Queen of Blood	Alien Queen		
1967	Games	Baroness		
1973	Doctor Death: Seeker of Souls	Tana		
1973	Space Boy	Alien Queen	Also writer & composer	
1976	The Astrologer	Diana Blair		

=== Television ===
Year	Title	Role	Notes
1957	The Adventures of Jim Bowie	Giselle Fry	Episode: "The Quarantine"
1958	The Millionaire	Elena	Episode: "The Johanna Judson Story"
1958	Dragnet		Episode: "The Big Honeymoon"
1958	Suspicion	Maria Nevada	Episode: "Death Watch"
1958	Behind Closed Doors	Marie Savit	Episode: "A Cover of Art"
1959	77 Sunset Strip	Madeleine	Episode: "A Check Will Do Nicely"
1959	Colonel Humphrey Flack	The Countess	Episode: "Follow the Bouncing Meatball"
1960	Have Gun – Will Travel	Madam L	Episode: "The Prophet"
1962	The Twilight Zone	Dagget's Girlfriend	Episode: "Dead Man's Shoes"
1965	The Man from U.N.C.L.E.	Drusilla Davina	Episode: "The Tigers Are Coming Affair"
1966	I Spy	Eliska	Episode: "Always Say Goodbye"
1973	Love, American Style	Hilary	Episode: "Love and the Twanger Tutor"
