= The Idol (1952 film) =

1952 film

- Directed by: Pierre Chenal
- Written by: Pierre Chenal; Reinaldo Lomboy; André Rigaud
- Produced by: Tom Lewis; René Olhaberry; Jaime Prades
- Starring: Alberto Closas; Elisa Galvé; Florence Marly
- Cinematography: Humberto Peruzzi
- Edited by: José Silva Taulis
- Music by: Acario Cotapos
- Production companies: Chile Films; Cinematografía Taulis
- Release date: 18 November 1952
- Running time: 83 minutes
- Countries: Argentina; Chile
- Language: Spanish

The Idol (Spanish: El ídolo) is a 1952 Argentine-Chilean thriller film of the classical-era directed by Pierre Chenal and starring Alberto Closas, Elisa Galvé and Florence Marly. It was shot on location around Santiago including at the Municipal Theatre.

== Cast ==
- Alberto Closas as Jorge Arnaud
- Elisa Galvé as Elena
- Florence Marly as Cristina Arnaud
- Eduardo Naveda as Doctor Enrique Bermúdez
- Pepe Rojas as Martínez
- Domingo Tessier as Lemos
- Gloria Lynch as Cora
- Eduardo Cuitiño as Doctor Salinas
- Roberto Parada
- Gaby Wagner
- Jorge Lillo
- Alfredo Marino

== Bibliography ==
- Navarro, Julio López. Películas chilenas. Editorial La Noria, 1994.
- Plazaola, Luis Trelles. South American Cinema: Dictionary of Film Makers. La Editorial, UPR, 1989.
