= Renate Druks =

American painter and filmmaker

Renate Druks

Renate Druks (2 January 1921 – 15 December 2007) was an American painter and filmmaker. She worked in Los Angeles, where she also practiced Thelema, the occult religious movement established by Aleister Crowley. She acted as a muse to other artists including Anaïs Nin, Marjorie Cameron and Kenneth Anger.

Druks was born in Vienna on 2 January 1921 into a Jewish family and went on to study at the Vienna Art Academy for Women. In 1938, she and her American husband fled Austria for the United States with their son, Peter. She studied further at the Art Students League, spent several years in Mexico, and eventually settled in Los Angeles. She threw lavish parties at her Malibu home, one of which became the inspiration for Anger's 1954 film, Inauguration of the Pleasure Dome.

Druks painted in a surrealist style and was inspired by paganism, tarot, and the occult. Her subjects were typically women and cats, and her style has been compared to Leonora Carrington and Leonor Fini. Her painting found little commercial success during her lifetime, but in July 2021, fourteen years after her death and more than fifty years since her last solo exhibit, a collection of her paintings was exhibited at Max Levai's Ranch gallery in Montauk, New York.

She was a close friend of Anaïs Nin and, in 1979, illustrated and published Nin's memoir of their friendship, Portrait in Three Dimensions. Nin's 1964 novel, Collages, was also inspired by Druks and the two collaborated on a screenplay adapted from the work.

Druks was also a filmmaker. In 1967 she made a 12 minute documentary about her painting process, titled A Painters Journal. In 1973 her short film Space Boy was nominated for a Grand Prix at the Cannes Film Festival. Space Boy was intended as a sequel to her friend Curtis Harrington's 1966 science-fiction horror film, Queen of Blood.
