= Collages (novel) =

1964 novel by Anaïs Nin

- Cover of the first paperback edition
- Author: Anaïs Nin
- Cover artist: Jean Varda
- Publisher: Alan Swallow
- Publication date: 1964
- ISBN: 9780804000451

Collages, published in 1964, was Anaïs Nin's sixth novel and last published work of fiction. The novel was a commercial success and was included in Time magazine's "Christmas List" of the best books of 1964.

A literary collage, it consists of 19 loosely connected episodes featuring the protagonist, a woman named Renate. The chapters feature a large cast of characters who come and go, several of whom appeared in some of Nin's other novels. The stories are set in Vienna, Mexico, New York, and California.

Renate was loosely based on Nin's friend and muse Renate Druks, and the two collaborated on a screenplay adapted from the work.
