= Roger Blin =

French actor and director (1907–1984)

- Born: Roger Paul Jules Blin; 22 March 1907; Neuilly-sur-Seine, France
- Died: 20 January 1984 (aged 76); Évecquemont, France
- Occupations: Film director, Actor
- Years active: 1925–1983

Roger Paul Jules Blin (22 March 1907 – 20 January 1984) was a French actor and director. He staged the world premieres of Samuel Beckett's Waiting for Godot in 1953 and Endgame in 1957.

== Biography ==
Blin was the son of a doctor; however, despite his father's wishes, Blin forged a career in the theatre. After graduating from the Institution Notre-Dame de Sainte-Croix in Neuilly-sur-Seine he attended the University of Paris, where he received a degree in literature in 1928. As a teenager Blin was "fascinated" by the Surrealists and their conception of revolutionary art.^{:35}

Politically, Blin took a left-wing and anti-fascist stance during the 1930s, taking part in the left-wing theatre collectives La Compagnie des Cinq and the Groupe Octobre.^{:35} He grew close to the French Trotskyist movement, and protested against Leon Trotsky's expulsion from France in 1934. In 1935 Blin served as Antonin Artaud's assistant director for his production of Les Cenci at the Théâtre des Folies-Wagram.^{:35} Following his work with Artaud, Blin focused on "political street-theatre."^{:46}

Blin served as a liaison between the Resistance and the French Army during World War II. In the post-war years, he was active within the Internationalist Communist Party. From 1949 he managed the Théâtre de la Gaîté-Montparnasse in Paris, where he staged plays by Denis Johnston, August Strindberg, and Jean Silvant.

His extensive career as both director and actor in both film and theatre has been largely defined by his work and relationship with Artaud, Samuel Beckett, and Jean Genet. In addition to being a close friend and confidant of Artaud during the latter's nine years of internment, he directed the first performances of Beckett's Waiting For Godot (1953), Endgame (1957), and Happy Days (1961), as well as the initial performances of Genet's The Blacks (1959) and the controversial The Screens (1961). The key correspondences between Blin and Genet have been published by Éditions Gallimard. In a letter to Georges Duthuit, Beckett wrote that he thought Blin wasn't a great actor nor director, but that he had a great love for the theater.

Blin was among the signatories of the so-called Manifesto of the 121 in support of the Algerian struggle for independence in 1960, causing him to be banned from the French airwaves and from appearing at state-owned theaters for one year. In the 1970s Blin co-directed the clown performance Les Assiettes with Philippe Gaulier. The performance starred Gaulier and Pierre Byland breaking 200 plates every night. The piece became a legendary hit in Paris, performing extensively at the Théâtre de l'Odéon and touring internationally.

The 1986 Faber and Faber publication of Samuel Beckett's Complete Dramatic Works carries only three dedications from Beckett: Endgame is dedicated to Blin, Come and Go to John Calder, and Catastrophe to Václav Havel.

== Partial filmography ==
- Street Without a Name (1934)
- Zouzou (1934) – Le témoin du meurtre (uncredited)
- The Mutiny of the Elsinore (1936) – Un marin
- Razumov: Sous les yeux d'occident (1936) – (uncredited)
- Life Belongs to Us (1936) – Un métallo
- Jenny (1936) – Le Malade solitaire
- Beethoven's Great Love (1936) – de Ries
- The Citadel of Silence (1937) – Un officier
- La dame de pique (1937) – (uncredited)
- The Alibi (1937) – Kretz, l'homme de main de Winckler
- Le temps des cerises (1938) – Le fils Dupuis
- Rasputin (1938) – Le jeune paysan (uncredited)
- The Lafarge Case (1938) – Le journalier
- Adrienne Lecouvreur (1938) – l'alchimiste
- The Curtain Rises (1938) – Dominique
- The White Slave (1939) – Maïr
- Louise (1939) – Un rapin (uncredited)
- The World Will Tremble (1939) – Le condamné
- Battement de coeur (1940)
- Volpone (1941) – Un vénitien (uncredited)
- L'âge d'or (1942)
- The Trump Card (1942) – Un aspirant
- Les Visiteurs du Soir (1942) – Le montreur de monstres
- Captain Fracasse (1943) – Fagotin / Fagottino
- Goodbye Leonard (1943) – Le chef bohémien
- Le Corbeau (1943) – François
- Love Story (1943) – L'homme du théâtre (uncredited)
- Colonel Chabert (1943) – Un Clerc
- First on the Rope (1944) – Paul Moury
- La vie de bohème (1945)
- The Last Judgment (1945)
- The Ideal Couple (1946) – Le somnambule
- Passionnelle (1947) – Julien
- Wicked City (1949) – Emilio
- Histoires extraordinaires (1949) – Guillaume
- Orpheus (1950) – The Poet
- Vagabonds imaginaires (1950) – Le récitant (segment 'Les amours jaunes') (voice)
- The Convict (1951) – Un bagnard
- Adventures of Captain Fabian (1951) – Philippe
- The King and the Mockingbird (1952) – L'aveugle (voice)
- Piédalu Works Miracles (1952)
- Le Chevalier de la nuit (1953) – Le domestique
- Your Turn, Callaghan (1955) – Wladimir
- The Hunchback of Notre Dame (1956) – Mathias Hungadi
- Checkerboard (1959) – Slim
- Paris Blues (1961) – Fausto the Moor (uncredited)
- A Taste for Women (1964) – Larsen
- Marie Soleil (1964) – Karl / Boss
- Les ruses du diable (Neuf portraits d'une jeune fille) (1966) – Monsieur de Beaurepaire
- Le Dimanche de la vie (1967) – Jean Sans-Tête
- La loi du survivant (1967) – Pao
- Trop petit mon ami (1970) – Boris
- Traîté du rossignol (1971) – Lars Larsen
- Dada au coeur (1974) – Max
- L'important c'est d'aimer (1975) – Servais's father
- Aloïse (1975) – Le professeur de chant
- Lily, aime-moi (1975) – Lily's father
- Il faut vivre dangereusement (1975) – Murdoc
- Nevermore, Forever (1976) – Daniel
- The Old Country Where Rimbaud Died (1977) – Le père de Jeanne
- Solveig et le violon turc (1977)
- The Adolescent (1979) – Romain
- Five and the Skin (1982) – Récitant (voice)
