= Santana Productions =

Film production company founded in 1948 by American actor Humphrey Bogart

Santana Productions was a film production company founded in 1948 by Humphrey Bogart. It was named after his yacht (and the cabin cruiser in Key Largo). The company released its films, known for its film noir through Columbia Pictures, but the majority of its motion pictures lost money at the box office, ultimately forcing the sale of Santana.

== Feature films ==
Year	Title	Distributor	Producer	Director	Star(s)	Notes
1949	Knock on Any Door	Columbia	Robert Lord	Nicholas Ray	Humphrey Bogart & John Derek	
1949	Tokyo Joe	Columbia	Robert Lord	Stuart Heisler	Humphrey Bogart & Alexander Knox	
1949	And Baby Makes Three	Columbia	Robert Lord	Henry Levin	Robert Young & Barbara Hale	
1950	In a Lonely Place	Columbia	Robert Lord	Nicholas Ray	Humphrey Bogart & Gloria Grahame	Added to the National Film Registry in 2007
1951	Sirocco	Columbia	Robert Lord	Curtis Bernhardt	Humphrey Bogart & Lee J. Cobb	
1951	The Family Secret	Columbia	Robert Lord	Henry Levin	John Derek & Lee J. Cobb	
1953	Beat the Devil	United Artists	John Huston	John Huston	Humphrey Bogart & Jennifer Jones	Co-produced with Romulus Films (UK); Screenplay by Truman Capote
