= Viaje sin regreso =

- Directed by: Pierre Chenal
- Written by: Hugo Mac Dougall
- Starring: Iris Marga, Eloy Álvarez, Guillermo Battaglia
- Cinematography: Bob Roberts
- Edited by: Kurt Land, Gerardo Rinaldi
- Music by: Juan Ehlert
- Release date: 1 February 1946
- Running time: 85 min
- Country: Argentina
- Language: Spanish

Viaje sin regreso is a 1946 Argentine film of the classical era of Argentine cinema, written by Hugo Mac Dougall and directed by Pierre Chenal.

== Cast ==
- Eloy Álvarez
- Guillermo Battaglia
- Sebastián Chiola
- Francisco de Paula
- Fausto Fornoni
- Mercedes Gisper
- Florence Marly
- Mary Parets
- Amalia Sánchez Ariño
- Alberto Terrones
- Carlos Thompson
