= Sealed Verdict =

1948 film by Lewis Allen

- Directed by: Lewis Allen
- Screenplay by: Jonathan Latimer
- Based on: The Sealed Verdict by Lionel Shapiro
- Produced by: Robert Fellows
- Starring: Ray Milland; Florence Marly; Broderick Crawford
- Cinematography: Leo Tover
- Edited by: Alma Macrorie
- Music by: Hugo Friedhofer
- Production company: Paramount Pictures
- Distributed by: Paramount Pictures
- Release date: November 5, 1948
- Running time: 83 minutes
- Country: United States
- Language: English

Sealed Verdict is a 1948 American mystery drama war film directed by Lewis Allen and starring Ray Milland, Florence Marly and starring Broderick Crawford. The film was based on the novel The Sealed Verdict by Lionel Shapiro. It was produced and distributed by Paramount Pictures. Extensive location shooting took place in Strasbourg, which had been occupied by the Germans from 1940 to 1944.

== Plot ==
Maj. Robert Lawson (Ray Milland), a lawyer working in Germany as part of the American Army's tribunal for prosecuting Nazi war criminals, successfully convicts Gen. Otto Steigmann (John Hoyt) of war crimes. Defense witness Themis DeLisle (Florence Marly), whose French Resistance father's life was saved by Steigmann, insists the German officer is innocent. Despite pressure from his superiors, Lawson decides to reopen his investigation, uncovering evidence that may clear Steigmann.

== Cast ==
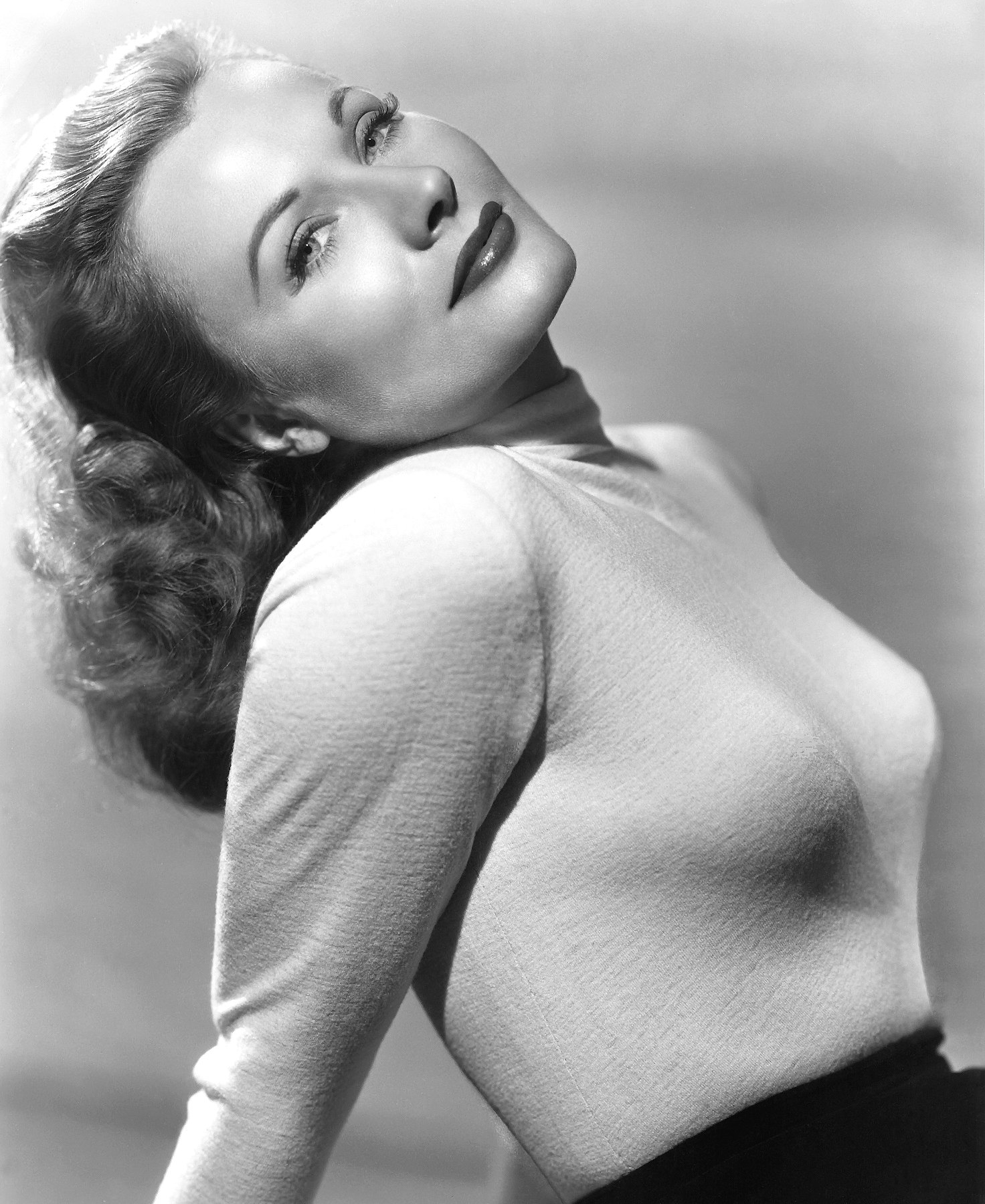
Florence Marly in an advertisement for Sealed Verdict

- Ray Milland as Maj. Robert Lawson
- Florence Marly as Themis DeLisle
- Broderick Crawford as Captain Kinsella
- John Hoyt as Gen. Otto Steigmann
- John Ridgely as Capt. Lance Nissen
- Ludwig Donath as Jacob Meyersohn
- Norbert Schiller as Slava Rodal
- Dan Tobin as Lieutenant Parker
- Olive Blakeney as Camilla Cameron
- Marcel Journet as Captain Gribemont
- Paul Lees as Private Clay
- James Bell as Mr. Elmer
- Elisabeth Risdon as Mrs. Cora Hockland
- Frank Conroy as Colonel Pike
- Celia Lovsky as Mrs. Emma Steigmann
- June Jeffery as Erika Wagner
- Patricia Miller as Maria Romanek
- Selmer Jackson as Dr. Bossin
- Charles Evans as General Kirkwood

== Critical response ==
Bosley Crowther of The New York Times wrote: "Within the dark and gloomy area of occupied Germany—or, at least, within that area as imagined in Hollywood—the romantic people at Paramount have discovered a little light. That light is the fitful flicker of a singular, purifying love, and it is revealed in a film called Sealed Verdict, which came to the Paramount Theatre yesterday."

== Bibliography ==
- McKay, James (2020). Ray Milland: The Films, 1929-1984 (Paperback). McFarland & Company. p. 165. ISBN 978-1476678870.
