= Space Boy (1973 film) =

- Directed by: Renate Druks
- Written by: Florence Marly
- Starring: Florence Marly and Stuart Thomson
- Cinematography: Jack Wallace
- Release date: 1973
- Running time: 6 minutes
- Country: United States
- Language: English

Space Boy is a 1973 short science fiction film directed by Austrian artist Renate Druks. It was written by Florence Marly and featured music from electronic music pioneers Bebe and Louis Barron. It's rumored that Frank Zappa drummed on the soundtrack. The film was nominated for a Grand Prix at the 1973 Cannes Film Festival.

Stuart Thomson plays the titular Space Boy and writer Florence Marly is the cosmic seductress Valana.

Space Boy was intended as a sequel to Curtis Harrington's 1966 science-fiction horror film, Queen of Blood, also featuring Marly, and itself based on an earlier Soviet film. In 2009, Space Boy was remade by Columbus, Ohio, filmmaker, Mike Olenick.
