= The Astrologer (1976 film) =

Science-fiction film

- Theatrical release poster
- Directed by: Craig Denney
- Written by: Dorothy June Pidgeon
- Produced by: John William Abbott; Alan Gornick; Ernest J. Helm
- Starring: Craig Denney; Darrien Earle; Rocky Barbanica; Boyd Hamlyn
- Cinematography: Alan Gornick
- Edited by: Owen C. Gladden
- Music by: Lee Osborne
- Release date: 1976
- Country: United States
- Language: English

The Astrologer is a 1976 American drama science-fiction film directed by and starring Craig Denney, and written by his mother, Dorothy June Pidgeon (no relation to Walter Pidgeon).

== Plot ==
In California, Craig Alexander pretends to be a psychic at carnival as a hustle, but then realises that he actually is psychic when he correctly reads a woman's palm. She joins his act and picks the pocket of audience members, but tires of it and leaves him after two years. Meanwhile, Craig's girlfriend Darrien is missing.

A rich couple then meet Craig for a picnic in a graveyard and present him with an opportunity to smuggle diamonds in Kenya. He takes it up, and soon finds himself in a Kenyan prison. The couple bail him out and then all three meet with a tribal leader, bribing him to learn the location of jewels in the jungle. They find them, but the man in the couple is bitten by a cobra and dies. Craig shoots the snake and leaves with the jewels. Another man then offers to give Craig a boat in exchange for a woman, which he accepts. However, Craig later shoots that man when he finds him on top of the woman.

Craig then spends several weeks at sea before arriving in Tahiti, where he tries to sell the jewels at a bar and takes part in a pearl diving scheme. While there, he manages to raise enough money to finance his job as a "mystic."

He then returns to California, where he provides psychic services to the U.S. Navy by helping locate a ship that went missing in the Devil's Triangle. Craig becomes rich and famous when a movie based on his life, The Astrologer, is a hit around the world. He is also able to locate Darrien in a hotel, finding she has become a sex worker. They marry, which makes international headline news, but later argue in a restaurant. When she cheats on him, he shoots the other man. As Craig's lifestyle begins to deteriorate, his old sidekick from the carnival days tells him: "You're not an astrologer. You're an asshole."

== Cast ==
- Craig Denney as Alexander
- Darrien Earle as Darrien
- Rocky Barbanica as Young Alexander
- Boyd Hamlyn as Boyd
- Jacqueline Day as Rita
- Lawrence Lee as Carnival Boss with Ax
- James Moore as Carnival Assistant
- Harvey Hunter as Prison Officer
- Solomon Mathenge as African Chief
- Robert Ballagh as White Trapper in Hut
- Joe Kaye as Kenya Police Lieutenant
- Diane DiSibio as Bargirl in Tahiti
- Allene Albano as Tarot Card Reader
- Avon Adele as Alexander's Sister
- Julie Moon as Alexander's Mother
- Donald Davies as Admiral
- Arthyr Chadbourne as Arthyr Chadbourne
- Florence Marly as Diana Blair
- Mercedes Risconsin as Theatrical Agent
- Irmgard Pancritius as Palmist on TV
- Geza Palasthy as Palmist Interpreter
- Maria Palasthy as Dream Interpreter
- John Kaiser as Darrien's Lover
- Donald Kohane as Self (as Father Donald Kohane)

== Production ==
Often confused for a horror film released the same year with the same title, the film heavily features the use of voiceover to further the plot.

The cinematographer was Alan Gormick, Jr., "a long-time underwater camera expert lensing what would be his only full feature."

The production company was Republic Pictures.

== Release ==
The Astrologer was set for release on January 14, a Wednesday, and "very deliberately so. 'The astrological aspects for the picture’s release were considered,' Denney confirmed for United Press International’s Vernon Scott. 'Even though it includes some heavy knowledge about astrology.”

There are conflicting reports of whether the movie was officially released, likely due to its liberal use of copyrighted music.

The film was lost until the American Genre Film Archive recovered it in "a batch of 1,000 pornographic prints." A successful Indiegogo campaign resulted in the film being digitized. As of 2021, the film was available on The Internet Archive.

== Reception ==
Linda Gross for The Los Angeles Times panned the film's acting and script, calling it "a poor imitation" of 1947's Nightmare Alley.

Don Shanahan of Every Movie Has a Lesson called the film, "a treat of a trainwreck" and "one filmmaker’s passion project is another man’s vanity film." Clint Worthington of The Spool wrote, "it can be easy to miss that feeling of discovering the diamond in the rough, that transcendently bad movie you only share with a few people you know through hushed whispers and traded bootleg tapes. Fear no more: thanks to delusional auteur Craig Denney, the diligent efforts of the American Genre Film Archive, and The AV Club and Daily Grindhouse's lineup of midnight showings at the Music Box, you can get that luster back with Denney's transcendently terrible fantasy-drama The Astrologer – a film that’s as good a case as any for the value of keeping a little bit of mystery in your moviegoing experience."
