= María Elena Gertner =

- Born: 1926; Iquique, Chile
- Died: 25 January 2013 (aged 86–87); Isla Negra, Chile
- Resting place: Catholic Cemetery of Santiago
- Occupation(s): Writer, actress
- Awards: CRAV Award (1964); Pablo Neruda Order of Artistic and Cultural Merit (2005)

María Elena Gertner (1926 (Note: Some sources give her birthdate as 1927 and 25 April 1928.) – 25 January 2013) was a Chilean actress, author, and television screenwriter.

== Biography ==
María Elena Gertner began her literary career with the 1950 poetry collection Homenaje al miedo. In this way, she was classified within the "generation of 1950" – also called the "generation of 1957" – of which her novel Islas en la ciudad is considered one of the six key works. (Note: The remaining five novels are Daniel y los leones dorados by José Manuel Vergara, Coronación by José Donoso, El cepo by Jaime Laso, El huésped by Margarita Aguirre, and Para subir al cielo by Enrique Lafourcade.) Among her early creations, the theatrical works La mujer que trajo la lluvia and La rosa perdida stood out. In 1964, she won the CRAV Award with her story "El invencible sueño del coronel".

She began acting in 1952, when she was a member of the Experimental Theater of the University of Chile. Later, she participated in the Art Theater of the Ministry of Education and in chamber theaters, exhibiting her previously mentioned theatrical stories as an actress and stage director. She also starred in the 1971 film Voto más fusil by Helvio Soto.

Gertner wrote several telenovelas for Televisión Nacional de Chile. One of the most controversial was La dama del balcón (1986), which included several Nazi characters and referred to the Third Reich, as well as genetic experiments. Because of this, the telenovela suffered censorship by the Social Communication Division (DINACOS), a body established during the military regime.

In 2005, Gertner received the Pablo Neruda Order of Artistic and Cultural Merit.

== Work ==
Regarding the novel Islas en la ciudad, the poet Marietta Morales Rodríguez described it in the following way in the magazine Cinosargo: "The main character is the city. A Santiago that turns people into islands and represents the isolation of conflicts."

=== Publications ===
Year	Title	Notes	Ref
1950	Homenaje al miedo	Poems	
1954	Niñita		
1958	Islas en la ciudad		
1959	Un juego de salón		
1963	Páramo salvaje		
1963	El invencible sueño del coronel		
1965	Después del desierto		
1965	La derrota		
1967	La mujer de sal		

=== Telenovelas ===
Year	Title	Role	Ref
1975	J. J. Juez	Performer	
1981	La Madrastra	Performer	
1982	De cara al mañana	Screenwriter	
1983	El juego de la vida	Screenwriter	
1985	Morir de amor	Screenwriter	
1986	La dama del balcón	Screenwriter	
1987	Mi nombre es Lara	Performer	
1988	Bellas y audaces	Performer	
1988	Las dos caras del amor	Performer	
1990	El milagro de vivir	Screenwriter	

=== Films ===
Year	Title	Type	Role	Ref
1949	La cadena infinita	Feature	Performer	
1954	Confession at Dawn	Feature	Screenwriter	
1971	Voto más fusil	Feature	Performer	
1975	La pérgola de las flores	TV film	Performer	

=== Theater ===
Year	Title	Ref
1951	La mujer que trajo la lluvia	
1952	La rosa perdida	
