= Riva Taylor =

British singer (born 1988)

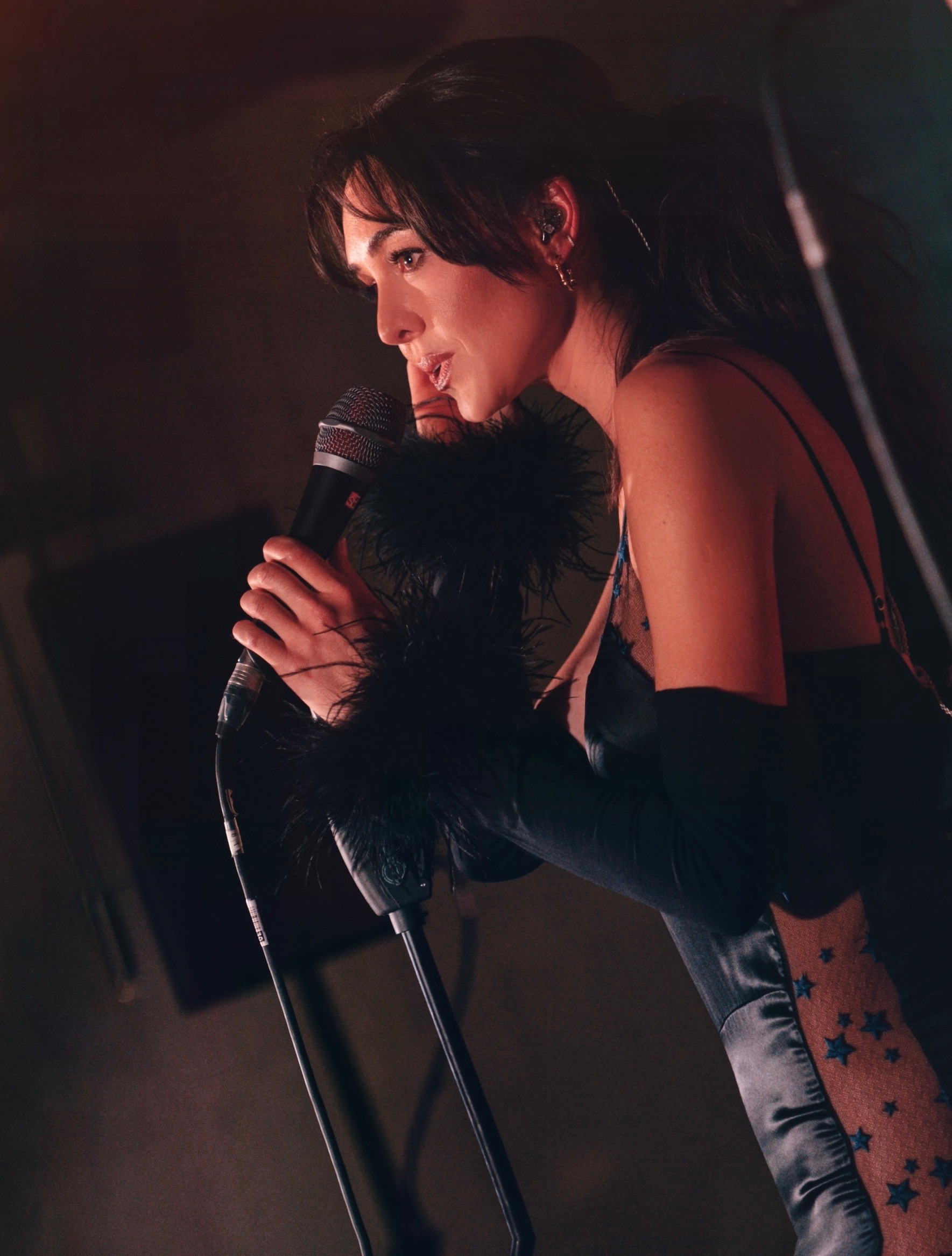

Background information
- Born: Rebecca Jane Grosvenor Taylor; Hammersmith, London
- Genres: Pop; classical crossover; jazz
- Occupations: Singer; actress
- Instrument: Vocals
- Years active: 2001–present
- Labels: EMI; Virgin Music Group
- Website: www.rivataylor.com

Rebecca Jane Grosvenor Taylor (born 29 June 1988), known professionally as Riva Taylor, is an English singer and actress. In her childhood and teens, she recorded under the names Becky Taylor, Becky Jane Taylor, and simply Becky.

== Early life and education ==
Taylor was born on June 29, 1988, in Hammersmith, London, daughter of Christopher Grosvenor Taylor of Oxshott, Surrey. She had her first experience on stage at the age of seven in London's West End, playing little Éponine in Les Misérables at the Palace Theatre. Other early achievements include winning the prestigious Thorndike Theatre Talent Competition for ages 8–24 at age eight and winning a British Arts Award for her dance performance in the musical The Secret Garden, also at eight. At the age of 10, she appeared on the BBC One children's TV show Blue Peter, performing "My Heart Will Go On".

Taylor attended Danes Hill School, Surrey, before studying for her GCSEs and A-levels at Tormead School, Guildford. She has said that living the life of a normal school girl was important for somebody exposed to the music industry from a young age. In 2010, she graduated with a degree in history from the University of Durham. Taylor is also an Associate of the Royal Academy of Dance.

== Career ==
=== 2001–2012: Early career ===
At the age of 12, she landed a recording contract with EMI Classics, becoming the youngest artist ever signed to the record label. Her debut album, A Dream Come True (2001), recorded at Abbey Road Studios and arranged by Simon Hale, was well received internationally. Later in the year, she performed at the Farm Aid charity concert gala at the Royal Albert Hall. Among the attendees was Prince Charles who praised the young Taylor and stated he would watch her career with great interest. She also caught the attention of Mohamed Al-Fayed who, after hearing her sing at her album launch at Harrods, invited her to open the Harrods Sale with Jean-Claude Van Damme and Salma Hayek.

Over those years, Taylor toured worldwide promoting her music. Her 2001 US tour was supported by promotional performances on Live with Regis and Kelly, hosted by guest presenter Usher, and on the MDA Labor Day Telethon in Los Angeles.

While Taylor's first album entirely consisted of show tunes, her second one could be defined as a classical–pop crossover. Naturally a soprano, with time she started using her "deeper range".

In 2005, she performed at the Last Night of the Audley End and Kenwood Proms with Wynne Evans. In 2006, she performed at the FA Cup Final at the Millennium Stadium, singing "Abide with Me" with Lesley Garrett. She also sang the Rugby World Cup anthem "World in Union" at the Madjeski Stadium for the Aviva Premiership in 2010 and the national anthem at the Twickenham Stadium for the Six Nations in 2012.

In January and February 2012, she appeared as a guest artist on both The Soldiers' and Alfie Boe's UK tours.

=== 2017–2021: This Woman's Heart ===
In 2017, Taylor released a club remix of her song "Deeper than Us" which charted at No. 3 in the Music Week pop charts and was backed by Pete Tong on BBC Radio 1 and Tiesto on his Club Life.

In 2018, she released a single titled "My Mouth" which was selected by Sir Elton John for his Beats1 show Rocket Hour.

In 2020, she released an album titled This Woman's Heart .1, featuring the singles "This Woman's Heart", "Jealous" and "Running at Walls". She had showcased the songs in 2019 at the British Summer Time music festival in London's Hyde Park, performing on the day headlined by Barbra Streisand.

in 2019, Taylor helped found the Songwriters' Circle held at Roundhouse, London, with Nashville songwriter Jeff Cohen. Later rebranded The Online Songwriters' Circle during the pandemic.

In 2021, she released the album This Woman's Heart .2 including BBC Radio 2 favourite "If I Could Ever Stop Loving You" and "Woman".

=== 2021–present: Colours of Blue and Mexico ===
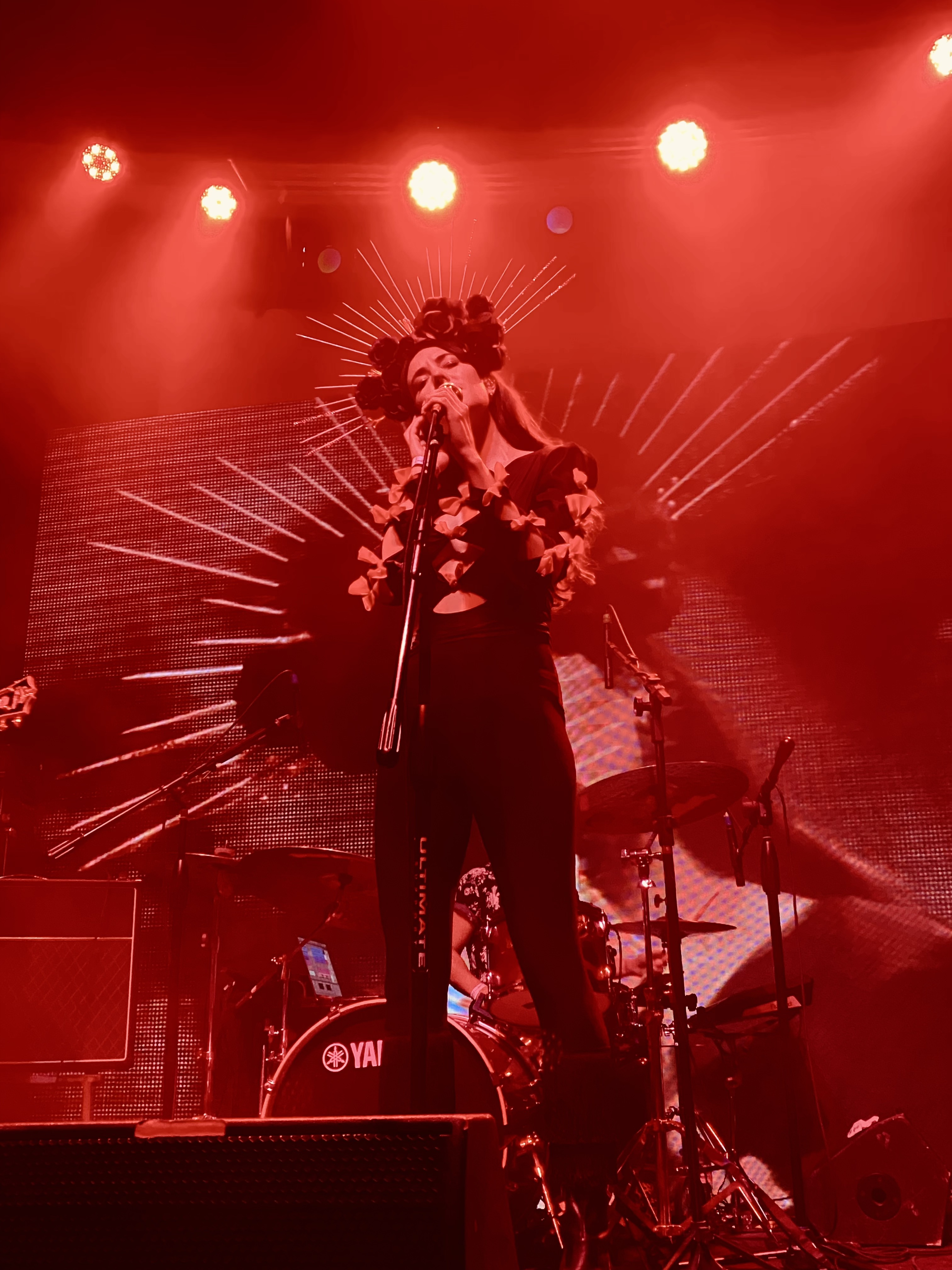
Riva performs at Foro Indie Rocks, Mexico City (2022)

In 2022, Taylor began writing songs between London and Mexico City, inspired by a love of jazz and the rhythms of Latin America. Her first release was a bossa nova song called "Colours of Blue" which Taylor performed live in Mexico on the TV program Sale el Sol. Her follow up single "Cubano" was supported by Los 40 and Exa FM and peaked at No. 17 in the radio charts In Mexico.

In 2024 Taylor released a multi-cultured pop album Colours of Blue.

== TV, film and video games ==
Taylor has recorded songs for a number of film and TV programmes, including "You Can Be a Hero" for the 2001 BBC One Christmas day animated special feature Second Star to the Left, starring Barbara Windsor and Hugh Laurie, and the theme tune for Barbie as Rapunzel.

In 2014 Taylor featured as a guest artist on the Video Games Live World Tour, performing her song from Assassin's Creed and Grammy-nominated music from Journey. Some venues included the Eventim Apollo, London, and the Heineken Music Hall, Amsterdam. Taylor also opened the Bafta Game Awards where she performed and presented the award for music with film composer David Arnold.

== Discography ==
=== Albums ===
Title	Album details	
Title	Album details	UK
A Dream Come True	Released: 2001 (as Becky Taylor); Label: EMI Classics; Format: CD	67
Shine	Released: October 2003 (as Becky); Label: EMI Records; Format: CD	—
By Your Side	Released: September 2005 (as Becky Jane Taylor); Compilation / repackage; Label: EMI Records; Format: CD	—
The Creed	Released: 2014 (as Riva Taylor); Label: Riva Music Ltd	—
This Woman's Heart .1	Released: 27 March 2020; Format: Digital download	—
This Woman's Heart .2	Released: 7 May 2021; Format: Digital download	—
Colours of Blue	Released: 14 June 2024; Format: Digital download	—

=== Extended plays ===
Title	EP details
Keeping It Together	Released: 2025; Label: R3vival

=== Singles ===
As Becky Taylor

- "You Can Be a Hero" (2001, EMI Classics) — a song from the 2001 BBC One Christmas day animated special feature Second Star to the Left
- "Song of Dreams" (2001, EMI Classics) — No. 60 in the UK

As Riva Taylor

- "My Mouth" (2018)
- "Running at Walls" (2018)
- "This Woman's Heart" (2019)
- "Jealous" (2020)
- "If I Could Ever Stop Loving You" (2020)
- "Woman" (2021)
- "Colours of Blue" (2022)
- "No Protection" (2022)
- "Cubano" (2023)
