= The Mutiny of the Elsinore (novel) =

1914 novel by Jack London

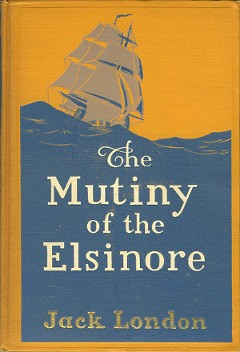
- First edition (publ. Macmillan)
- Author: Jack London
- Language: English
- Publication date: 1914

The Mutiny of the Elsinore is a novel by the American writer Jack London first published in 1914. The novel is partially based on London's voyage around Cape Horn on the Dirigo in 1912.

The character "De Casseres", who espouses nihilistic viewpoints similar to the ideas of French philosopher Jules de Gaultier, is based on London's real-life friend and journalist Benjamin De Casseres.

== Summary ==
After the death of the captain, the crew of a ship split between the two senior surviving mates in a mutiny, and eventually come under control of the narrator. The narrator also develops relationships with several characters.

During the conflict, the narrator develops as a strong character, rather as in The Sea-Wolf. It also includes some strong right views which were part of London's complex world-view.

== Adaptations ==
The novel has been adapted into films three times. In 1920 an American silent version The Mutiny of the Elisnore was made. A 1936 French adaptation Les mutinés de l'Elseneur directed by Pierre Chenal and a 1937 British film The Mutiny of the Elsinore were both made in sound.
