= The Alibi (1937 film) =

1937 film

- Directed by: Pierre Chenal
- Written by: Marcel Achard; Jacques Companéez; Herbert Juttke; Pierre Chenal
- Produced by: Fritz Bukofzer
- Starring: Erich von Stroheim; Albert Préjean; Jany Holt
- Cinematography: Theodore J. Pahle
- Edited by: Gustaf Heidenheim
- Music by: Georges Auric; Jacques Belasco
- Production company: B.N. Films
- Distributed by: Éclair-Journal
- Release date: 23 December 1937
- Running time: 84 minutes
- Country: France
- Language: French

The Alibi (French: L'Alibi) is a 1937 French mystery film directed by Pierre Chenal and starring Erich von Stroheim, Albert Préjean and Jany Holt. It has been described as a precursor to film noir. The film was shot at the Billancourt Studios and Epinay Studios in Paris. Location shooting took place at Trilport on the River Seine. The film's sets were designed by the art directors Eugène Lourié and Serge Piménoff.

The film was well received by critics on its release. It was released in the United States in April 1939 by Columbia Pictures. It was remade as the 1942 British film Alibi starring Margaret Lockwood and James Mason.

== Synopsis ==
Professor Winckler, a stage thought reader, encounters an old enemy and kills him. He pays one of the hostesses at the nightclub he performs at to give him an alibi. A police detective is convinced that Winckler is the murderer and sets out to break the alibi.

== Cast ==
- Erich von Stroheim as Le professeur Winckler
- Albert Préjean as André Laurent
- Jany Holt as Hélène Ardouin
- Louis Jouvet as Le commissaire Calas
- Véra Flory as Une entraîneuse
- Foun-Sen as L'assistante de Winckler
- Génia Vaury as Une entraîneuse
- Made Siamé as La secrétaire de Calas
- Roger Blin as Kretz, l'homme de main de Winckler
- Philippe Richard as John Gordon
- Jean Témerson as Jojo, l'ami de Dany
- Maurice Baquet as Gérard
- Pierre Labry as Le premier inspecteur
- Max Dalban as Le second inspecteur
- Florence Marly as La maitresse de Gordon
- Margo Lion as Dany
- Bobby Martin as Le chef d'orchestre de jazz
- Thelma Minor as La chanteuse de l'orchestre
- Jacques Beauvais as Le maître d'hôtel
- Albert Brouett as L'huissier
- Paul Delauzac as L'avocat
- Fernand Flament as Un inspecteur
- Henry Houry as L'Américain
- Paul Marthès as Le gros dandy
- Laura Marvel as La danseuse
- Marcel Melrac as Un agent
- Monique Rolland as Une entraîneuse
- Odette Talazac as La logeuse
- Bobby Waisberg as Le petit fleuriste
- René Worms as Le patron de Calas

== Bibliography ==
- Andrews, Dudley. Mists of Regret: Culture and Sensibility in Classic French Film. Princeton University Press, 1995.
- Grant, Kevin. Roots of Film Noir: Precursors from the Silent Era to the 1940s. McFarland, 2002.
