= The Lafarge Case =

1938 film

- Directed by: Pierre Chenal
- Written by: André-Paul Antoine; Jean Aurenche; Henri Calef; Ernest Fornairon (book); Arnold Lippschitz
- Produced by: Arnold Pressburger
- Starring: Pierre Renoir; Marcelle Chantal; Raymond Rouleau
- Cinematography: Louis Page; Theodore J. Pahle
- Edited by: Christian Gaudin; Jean Oser
- Music by: Georges Auric
- Production companies: Compagnie Internationale de Productions Cinématographiques; Trianon Films
- Distributed by: Mondial Films
- Release date: 8 March 1938
- Running time: 110 minutes
- Country: France
- Language: French

The Lafarge Case (French: L'Affaire Lafarge) is a 1938 French historical crime drama film directed by Pierre Chenal and starring Pierre Renoir, Marcelle Chantal and Raymond Rouleau. It recalls a famous nineteenth century case, and is mostly portrayed in flashback. The film's sets were designed by the art directors Robert Gys and Eugène Lourié.

== Synopsis ==
In the 1840s Marie a young woman from Paris is married to Charles, a brutal, unpleasant ironmaster in provincial France. When he dies under mysterious circumstances she is accused of murdering him by his family and is put on trial.

== Cast ==
- Pierre Renoir as Charles Lafarge
- Marcelle Chantal as Marie Lafarge-Capelle
- Raymond Rouleau as Maître Lachaud
- Margo Lion as Aména Lafarge
- Sylvie as Adélaîde Lafarge
- Erich von Stroheim as Denis
- Florence Marly as Emma Pontier
- Berthe d'Yd as Mlle. Brun
- Auguste Bovério as Le président des Assises
- Sylvette Fillacier as Clémentine
- Palau as Defoy
- Lisette Missier as Mlle. von Martens
- Odette Talazac as L'aubergiste
- Yvette Darnys as Une fille
- Solange Sicard as Une fille
- Agnès Duval as Catherine
- René Bergeron as L'oncle Pontier
- Paul Amiot as Le procureur
- André Gabriello as Rogue
- Gustave Gallet as Orfiela
- Franck Maurice as Le préfet
- Roger Blin as Le journalier
- Georges Douking as Parent
- Etienne Decroux as Un paysan
- François Viguier as Un expert
- Gonzague Frick as Le greffier
- Jean Bouzanquet as Le cavalier
- Martial Rèbe as Le médecin
- Georges Mauloy as Le directeur de la prison
- Edmond Castel as Le sous-directeur de la prison
- Marc Daray as Forge
- Paul Marthès as Le curé
- Morris as Le préfet

== Bibliography ==
- Andrews, Dudley. Mists of Regret: Culture and Sensibility in Classic French Film. Princeton University Press, 1995.
