= The Damned (1947 film) =

1947 film

- Film poster
- French: Les Maudits
- Directed by: René Clément
- Written by: Victor Alexandrov; René Clément; Jacques Companéez; Henri Jeanson; Jacques Rémy
- Produced by: André Paulvé
- Starring: Marcel Dalio; Henri Vidal; Florence Marly; Fosco Giachetti
- Cinematography: Henri Alekan
- Edited by: Roger Dwyre
- Music by: Yves Baudrier
- Production company: Spéva Films
- Distributed by: Gaumont
- Release date: 19 September 1947
- Running time: 102 minutes
- Country: France
- Languages: French; German

The Damned (French: Les Maudits) is a 1947 French war film and drama film directed by René Clément and starring Marcel Dalio, Henri Vidal, Florence Marly and Fosco Giachetti.. It was entered into the 1947 Cannes Film Festival. The film is notable for its depiction of the interior of a wartime submarine and for its tracking shots through the length of the U-boat. It was shot at the Victorine Studios in Nice and on location around Toulon and the Mediterranean coastline. The film's sets were designed by the art director Paul Betrand.

== Plot ==
Germany is on the verge of losing World War II and powerful Nazis and sympathizers from various countries head for South America in a German submarine leaving from Oslo. The film's narrator is a French doctor who has been kidnapped to tend a sick woman whose husband and lover, a German general, are also on board. The doctor realizes he will probably be murdered once the woman has recovered so he tries various stratagems to escape. All fail.

As the war draws to an end, the passengers lose faith in the supposed mission of continuing the struggle from South America, with passengers either trying to escape or committing suicide. One fanatical Nazi tries to continue the voyage even after Berlin has fallen and orders issued for U-boats to go to the nearest port and surrender. Part of the crew finally mutinies against the fanatics, with some getting away in a lifeboat and the rest drowning. The doctor ends up alone on the submarine for days, writing an account of his adventure for posterity, until a US Navy ship rescues him and sinks his hated prison.

== Cast ==
- Marcel Dalio as Larga (as Dalio)
- Henri Vidal as Docteur Guilbert
- Florence Marly as Hilde Garosi
- Fosco Giachetti as Garosi
- Paul Bernard as Couturier
- Jo Dest as Forster (as Jodest)
- Michel Auclair as Willy Morus
- Anne Campion as Ingrid Ericksen
- Andreas von Halberstadt (as A. Von Halberstadt)
- Lucien Hector as Ericksen
- Jean Lozach (as Lozach)
- Karl Münch (as Karl Munch)

== Restoration ==
In 2013, the Cohen Film Collection released The Damned on Blu-ray and DVD in the US, using a restoration carried out by the French distributor, Gaumont.
