= Obrnice =

- Municipality
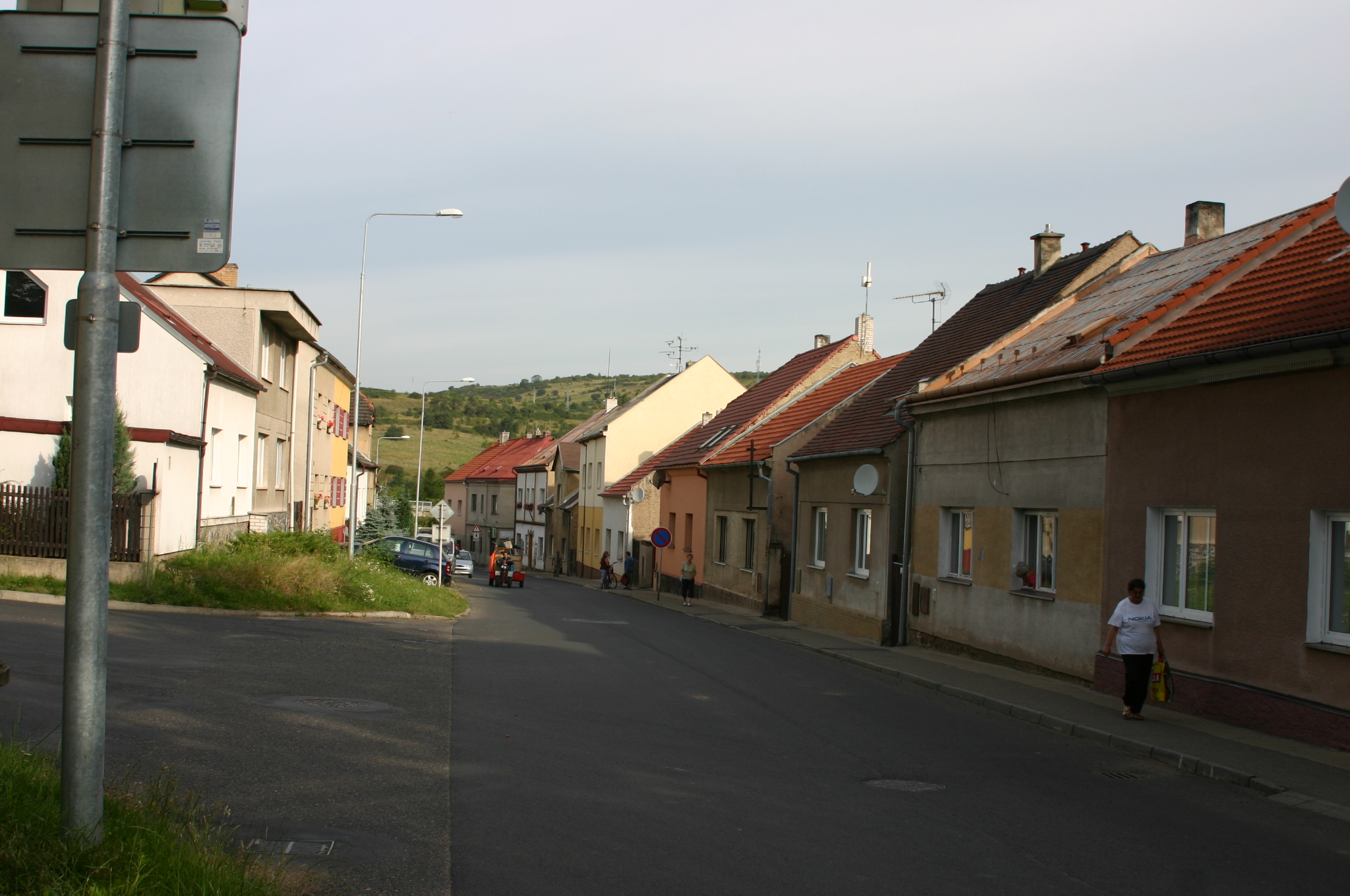
- Main street

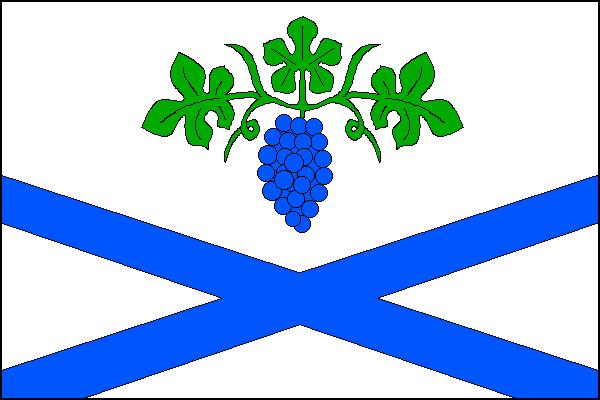
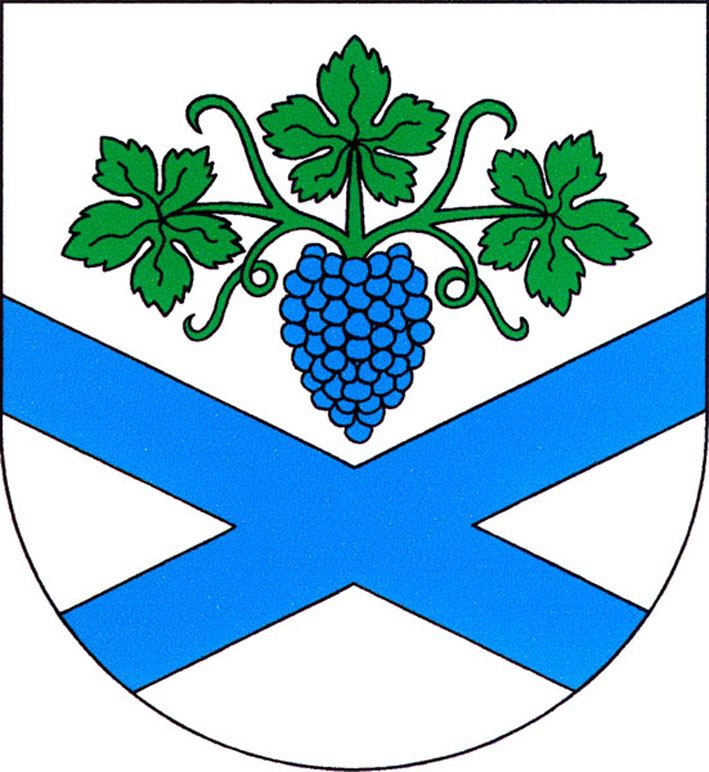
- Flag Coat of arms

- Location in the Czech Republic
- Coordinates: 50°30′18″N 13°41′44″E
- Country: Czech Republic
- Region: Ústí nad Labem
- District: Most
- First mentioned: 1282

Area
  - Total: 7.47 km^{2} (2.88 sq mi)
- Elevation: 213 m (699 ft)

Population (2026-01-01)
  - Total: 2,048
  - Density: 274/km^{2} (710/sq mi)
- Time zone: UTC+1 (CET)
  - Summer (DST): UTC+2 (CEST)
- Postal code: 435 21
- Website: www.ouobrnice.cz

Obrnice (German: Obernitz) is a municipality and village in Most District in the Ústí nad Labem Region of the Czech Republic. It has about 2,000 inhabitants.

== Administrative division ==
Obrnice consists of three municipal parts (in brackets population according to the 2021 census):

- Obrnice (1,604)
- České Zlatníky (184)
- Chanov (69)

== Etymology ==
The initial name of the village was probably Obornice and originated from the word obora (i.e. 'game reserve'), meaning "the village near a game reserve".

== Geography ==
Obrnice is located about 2 kilometres (1 mi) east of Most and 29 km (18 mi) southwest of Ústí nad Labem. It lies in the Central Bohemian Uplands. The Bílina River flows through the municipality. The highest point is the hill Zlatník at 522 m (1,713 ft) above sea level. The hill and its surroundings is protected as a national nature reserve.

== History ==
The first written mention of Obrnice is from 1282, when the village was donated to the monastery in Osek. Except for the years 1420–1460 and 1620–1629, when it passed into the hands of various nobles, the village was owned by the monastery. In the 19th century, mining of lignite developed in the region, which also meant an influx of residents to Obrnice. Brickworks were established here and more workers were coming here. The railway was built in 1871.

== Demographics ==
Historical population

| Year | Pop. | ±% |
|---|---|---|
| 1869 | 492 | — |
| 1880 | 677 | +37.6% |
| 1890 | 684 | +1.0% |
| 1900 | 1,091 | +59.5% |
| 1910 | 1,558 | +42.8% |

| Year | Pop. | ±% |
|---|---|---|
| 1921 | 1,579 | +1.3% |
| 1930 | 1,806 | +14.4% |
| 1950 | 1,201 | −33.5% |
| 1961 | 1,217 | +1.3% |
| 1970 | 1,060 | −12.9% |

| Year | Pop. | ±% |
|---|---|---|
| 1980 | 2,835 | +167.5% |
| 1991 | 2,466 | −13.0% |
| 2001 | 2,623 | +6.4% |
| 2011 | 2,107 | −19.7% |
| 2021 | 1,857 | −11.9% |

Source: Censuses

== Transport ==
Obrnice is located at the intersection of three main roads: the I/13 (the section from Most to Teplice, the I/15 (from Most to Lovosice) and the I/27 (the section from Most to Plzeň).

Obrnice is located on the railway line Most–Rakovník.

== Sights ==
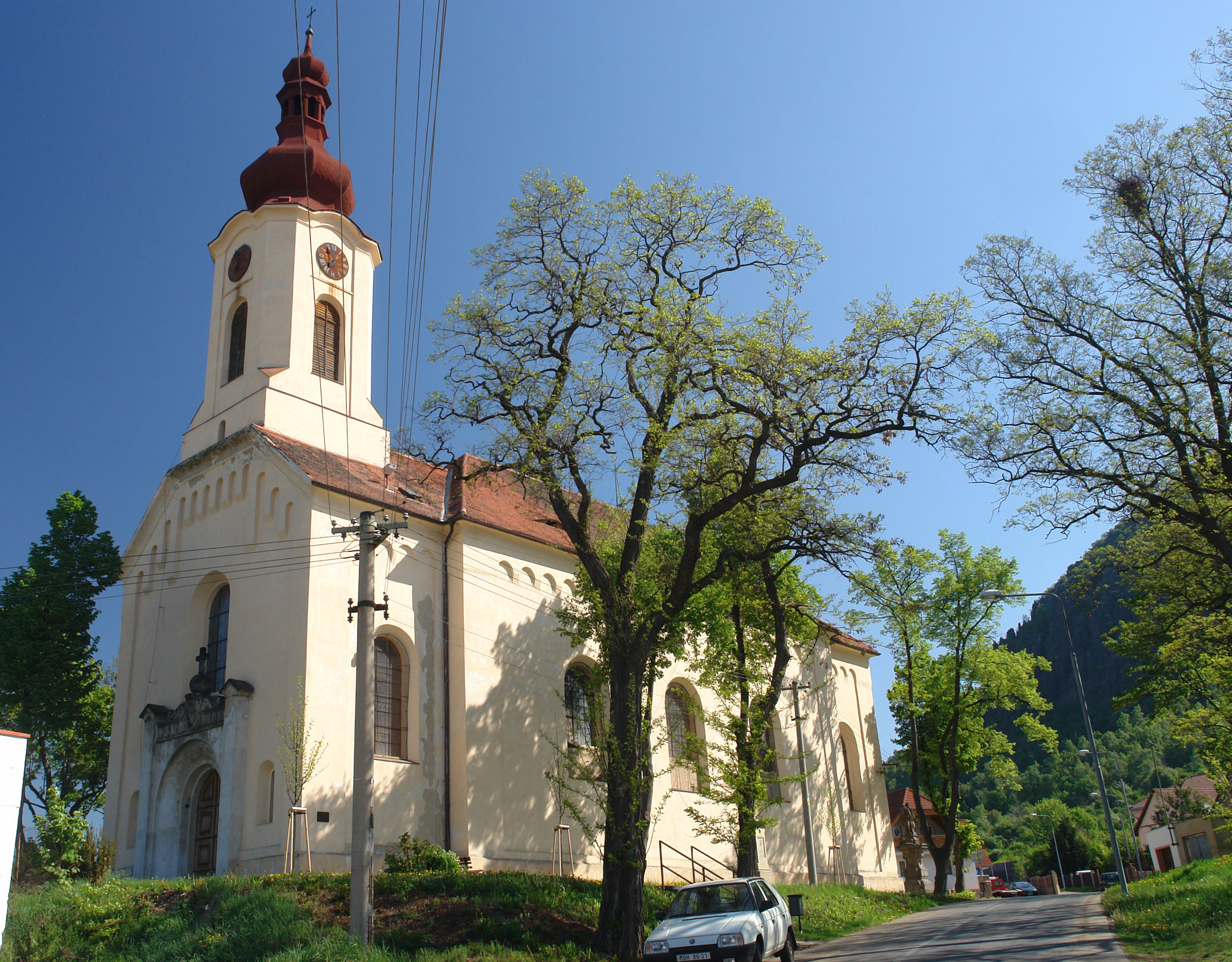
Church of Saint George

The most important monument is the Church of Saint George in České Zlatníky. It was built in the Baroque style in 1694, then it was rebuilt in the neo-Romanesque style in 1861. During the reconstruction in 1861, part of the equipment from the demolished Church of Saint Francis Seraph in Most was moved here.

The main landmark of Obrnice is the Chapel of the Holy Trinity. It was built in the neo-Gothic style at the end of the 19th century.

== Notable people ==
- Florence Marly (1919–1978), French actress
