= And Baby Makes Three =

1949 film by Henry Levin

- Directed by: Henry Levin
- Written by: Lou Breslow; Joseph Hoffman
- Produced by: Robert Lord
- Starring: Robert Young; Barbara Hale; Janis Carter
- Cinematography: Burnett Guffey
- Edited by: Viola Lawrence
- Music by: George Duning
- Color process: Black and white
- Production company: Santana Pictures Corporation
- Distributed by: Columbia Pictures
- Release dates: December 2, 1949 (United States); December 22, 1949 (New York City)
- Running time: 84 minutes
- Country: United States
- Language: English

And Baby Makes Three is a 1949 American romantic comedy film directed by Henry Levin and starring Robert Young and Barbara Hale. The title comes from a line in the 1927 song "My Blue Heaven".

== Plot ==
Jackie Walsh, recently divorced from Vernon Walsh, is told she is pregnant with Vernon's child just as she is preparing to marry another man, Herbert Fletcher.

== Cast ==
- Robert Young as Vernon "Vern" Walsh
- Barbara Hale as Jacqueline "Jackie" Walsh
- Robert Hutton as Herbert T. "Herbie" Fletcher
- Janis Carter as Wanda York
- Billie Burke as Mrs. Marvin Fletcher
- Nicholas Joy as Marvin Fletcher
- Lloyd Corrigan as Dr. William M. "Uncle Bill" Parnell
- Howland Chamberlain as Otto Stacy
- Melville Cooper as Gibson - Fletcher's Butler
- Joe Sawyer as Motorcycle Cop

== Production ==
The film was known as You Made Me Love You and it was made for Humphrey Bogart's company. Ronald Reagan was the original star.

== Critical reception ==
While Variety praised the film, noting that "Levin's direction gets good movement into the script" and "comedy touches are neatly devised", The New York Times dismissed it as a "frail comedy" with "a few weak, scattered laughs".
