= Mikhail Karyukov =

Soviet film director, cinematographer and screenwriter

Mikhail Fyodorovich Karyukov (Russian: Михаи́л Фёдорович Карю́ков; July 27, 1905 – December 2, 1992) was a Soviet film director, cinematographer and screenwriter. He was born in Odessa, Russian Empire.

From 1923 to 1925 he studied at the economic faculty of Trade-Industrial College. In 1925 he graduated from the projectional courses at the Odessa State College of Cinematographers (ГТК). In 1930 he joined the cinematographic department of the Odessa Cinema College. He is the special effects designer and organizer of the special effects department at various studios. Since 1955, he is the cinematographer of the Odessa Film Studio. In 1939 he wrote New ways of combined shooting (Новые способы комбинированных съёмок). Co-author of his film scripts and the film Pakhta-Oi (Пахта-Ой).

== Filmography ==
- 1941 – Mysterious Island (Russian: Таинственный остров, romanized: Tainstvenny ostrov)
- 1955 – The Shadow Near the Pier (Russian: Тень у пирса, romanized: Ten u pirsa)
- 1960 – The Heavens Call (Russian: Небо зовёт, romanized: Nebo zovyot)
- 1963 – A Dream Come True (Russian: Мечте навстречу, romanized: Mechte navstrechu)
- 1966 – Queen of Blood
