= Tokyo Joe (film) =

1949 film by Stuart Heisler

- 1949 film poster
- Directed by: Stuart Heisler
- Screenplay by: Cyril Hume; Bertram Millhauser
- Adaptation by: Walter Doniger
- Story by: Steve Fisher
- Produced by: Robert Lord
- Starring: Humphrey Bogart; Alexander Knox; Florence Marly; Sessue Hayakawa
- Cinematography: Charles Lawton Jr.
- Edited by: Viola Lawrence
- Music by: George Antheil
- Production company: Santana Pictures Corporation
- Distributed by: Columbia Pictures
- Release dates: October 26, 1949 (New York City, premiere); November 1949 (US)
- Running time: 89 minutes
- Country: United States
- Language: English
- Box office: $1.9 million

Tokyo Joe is a 1949 American crime film noir directed by Stuart Heisler and starring Humphrey Bogart, Alexander Knox, Florence Marly, and Sessue Hayakawa. Bogart plays a former US Air Force officer who tries to rebuild his pre-war life Allied-occupied Tokyo, but becomes embroiled in a smuggling plot led by former Imperial Japanese officials.

The film was notable for being the first American feature film to shoot in Japan after the end of World War II, as well as the first postwar acting role of Sessue Hayakawa. It was released by Columbia Pictures in November 1949.

== Plot ==
Joe Barrett, an ex-US Air Force Colonel and World War II veteran, returns to Tokyo to see if there is anything left of his pre-war bar and gambling joint, Tokyo Joe's. Amazingly, it is more or less intact and being run by his old friend Ito. Joe is shocked to learn from Ito that his wife Trina, who he thought had died in the war, is still alive. She has divorced Joe and is married to Mark Landis, a lawyer working in the American occupation of Japan. She has a seven-year-old child named Anya.

To stay in Japan after his visitor's permit expires in 60 days, Joe wants to set up an airline freight franchise, but he needs financial backing. Through Ito, Joe meets Baron Kimura, a former official in the Kempeitai. Kimura offers to finance a small airline business that will carry frozen frogs for export to North and South America, even though Joe believes Kimura is going to use the airline as a front, carrying penicillin, saccharine, and pearls. But as the army hesitates in giving Joe permission to open the business, Kimura shows him proof from the Kempeitai files that Trina worked broadcasting propaganda for the Japanese, a treasonable offense since she was a naturalized American citizen married to an American citizen. When Joe confronts Trina with this evidence, she explains that she made the broadcasts only to protect her newborn baby whom the Japanese took away from her when she was in a prison camp. She reveals that she was pregnant when Joe deserted her, and that Anya is his daughter. Joe wants to back out of the airline deal, but Kimura demands that he go through with it. To save Trina, Joe accepts Kimura's proposal and convinces Landis to help him start the airline business before his visitor's permit expires.

Joe then discovers through American occupation authorities that Kimura actually intends to smuggle in fugitive war criminals (former senior officers of the Imperial Japanese Army and the leader of the Black Dragon Society) to start an underground anti-American movement. The authorities plan to apprehend them when they land at Haneda Airfield. But Kimura finds out that Joe had met with the Americans, and before Joe flies to Korea, Kimura informs him that Anya has been kidnapped and will be freed only when the Japanese are delivered at a certain deadline. Joe picks up his passengers and is about to land them at the Army-designated airfield when the Japanese hijack the plane with guns and land at a different airstrip. The US Army intercepts the Japanese before they can be driven away, as they had every airstrip on Honshu covered.

Back at the bar, Joe finds out from mortally wounded Ito that Anya is being held in a basement at the old hotel next door. Joe enters the dark cavern and finds Anya, but he is shot by Kimura as he carries Anya to safety. Arriving American soldiers kill Kimura. Joe, fatally wounded, is carried out on a stretcher.

== Cast ==
From The Films of Humphrey Bogart and the AFI Catalog of Feature Films:

- Humphrey Bogart as Joseph 'Joe' Barrett
- Alexander Knox as Mark Landis
- Florence Marly as Trina Pechinkov Landis
- Sessue Hayakawa as Baron Kimura
- Jerome Courtland as Danny
- Gordon Jones as Idaho
- Teru Shimada as Ito
- Hideo Mori as Kanda
- Charles Meredith as General Ireton
- Rhys Williams as Colonel Dahlgren
- Lora Lee Michel as Anya

Uncredited

- Whit Bissell as Capt. Winnow
- Harold Goodwin as Major J.F.X. Loomis
- James Cardwell as MP Captain
- Tetsu Komai as Lt. Gen. "The Butcher" Takenobu
- Otto Han Yamaoka as Col. Hara
- Lane Nakano as Rickshaw Driver
- Rollin Moriyama as Manservant
- Hugh Beaumont as Provost Marshal Major
- Harlan Warde as Lieutenant at Airport

== Production ==
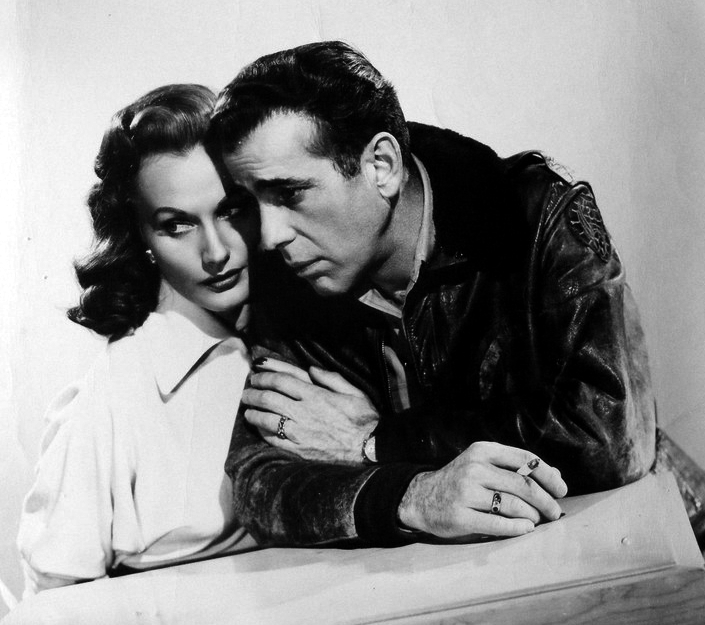
Florence Marly and Humphrey Bogart in an advertisement for Tokyo Joe

The film was Sessue Hayakawa's first postwar project and served as a revitalization of his career. From 1937 to 1949, Hayakawa had been in France, first as an actor and then was caught up in the German occupation, living ostensibly as an artist, selling watercolors. After joining the French Resistance, he aided Allied flyers during the war. When Humphrey Bogart's production company, Santana Pictures, tracked him down to offer him a role in Tokyo Joe, the American Consulate investigated Hayakawa's activities during the war before issuing a work permit.

Principal filming for Tokyo Joe took place from January 4 to the end of February 1949 on the Columbia Pictures studio lot. A second unit, led by director Arthur S. Black Jr. and cinematographer Joseph Biroc, went to Tokyo to collect exterior scene shots and was the first American film production to film in postwar Japan.

The use of a Lockheed Hudson bomber converted into cargo hauling is featured with both interiors, and aerial sequences revolving around the aircraft.

This was Stuart Heisler's first of two features starring Bogart, the other was Chain Lightning that also completed in 1949 but was held up in release until 1950.

== Reception ==
The film fared well with the public as the subject of postwar Japan was an intriguing one featured in many of the headlines of the day. Most viewers were convinced that the film was a semi-documentary due to the extensive use of footage shot in Japan. The critics were less charitable, The New York Times contemporary review noted the juxtaposition of the footage as jarring: "a note of reality which is embarrassingly at odds with the major and markedly synthetic elements of the plot", further stating: "The big weakness of Tokyo Joe, however, is a script which does not neatly come together, but squanders its good points amidst a field of corn."

== Home media ==
Tokyo Joe was released in VHS format for home viewing on August 17, 1989, by Columbia TriStar with a further DVD release in 2004.

== Bibliography ==
- Hardwick, Jack and Ed Schnepf. "A Buff's Guide to Aviation Movies". Air Progress Aviation Vol. 7, No. 1, Spring 1983.
- Michael, Paul. Humphrey Bogart: The Man and his Films. New York: Bonanza Books, 1965.
