= The Mutiny of the Elsinore (1920 film) =

1920 film by Edward Sloman

The Mutiny of the Elisnore
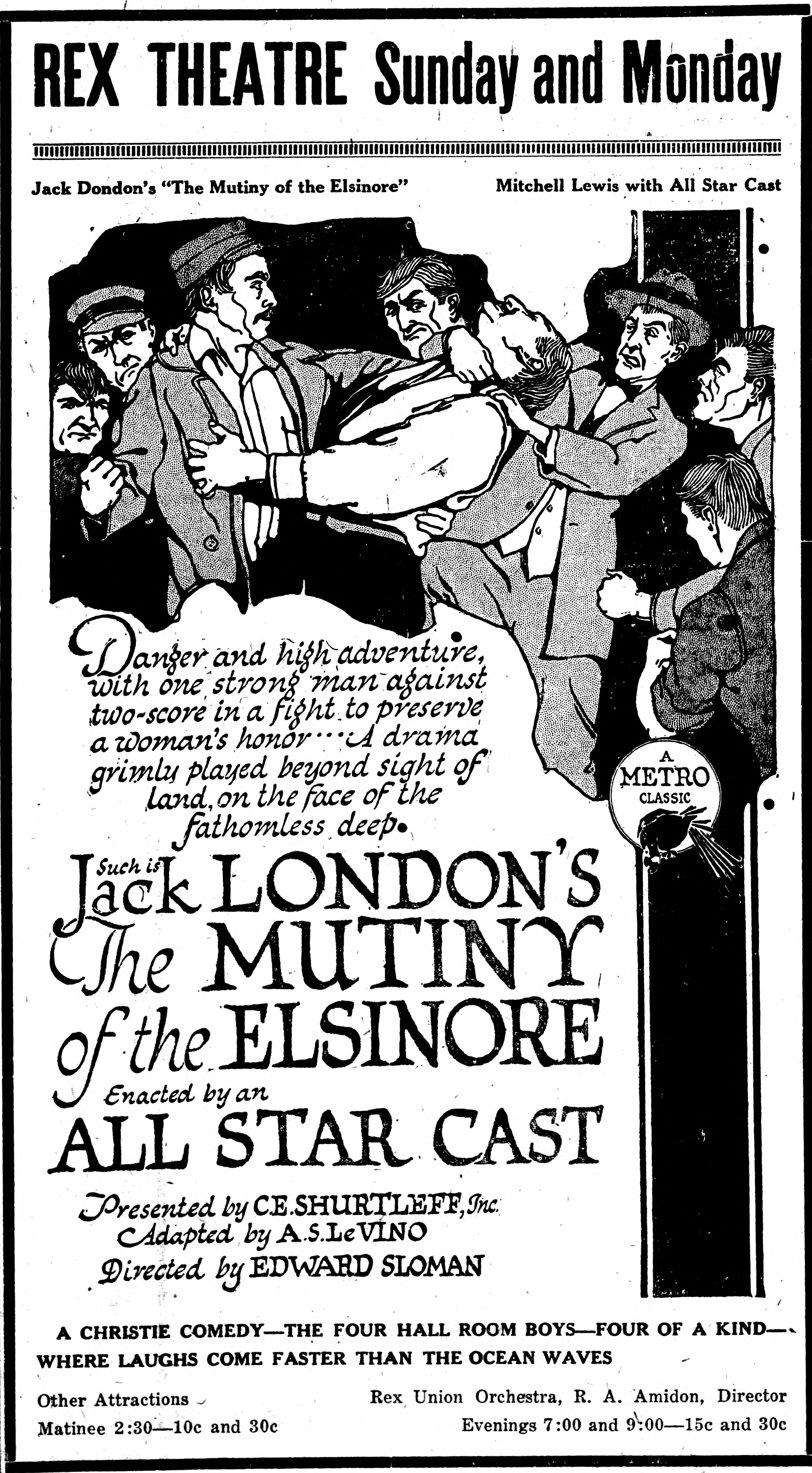
- Newspaper advertisement
- Directed by: Edward Sloman
- Written by: Albert S. Le Vino (scenario)
- Based on: The Mutiny of the Elsinore by Jack London
- Starring: Mitchell Lewis; Helen Ferguson; Noah Beery Sr.
- Cinematography: Jackson Rose
- Production company: C.E. Shurtleff Inc.
- Distributed by: Metro Pictures
- Release date: October 1920
- Running time: 6 reels
- Country: United States
- Language: Silent (English intertitles)

The Mutiny of the Elisnore is a 1920 American silent action-adventure film directed by Edward Sloman and starring Mitchell Lewis, Helen Ferguson, and Noah Beery Sr. It is an adaptation of the 1914 Jack London novel The Mutiny of the Elsinore. An incomplete copy of the film survives at the UCLA Film & Television Archive.

== Plot ==
As described in a film magazine, during a cruise of the Elsinore, Captain Nathaniel Somers is assassinated and John Pike takes control of the schooner to provide an income for the skipper's son Dick. The latter dislikes the sea, but Pike insists that he make the voyage to keep his obligations to Margaret West, daughter of a former half-owner of the ship. Members of the crew are cut-throats, and mutiny at the earliest opportunity, giving Pike the fight for his life.

== Cast ==
- Mitchell Lewis as John Pike
- Helen Ferguson as Margaret West
- Noah Beery Sr. as Andreas Mellaire
- Casson Ferguson as Dick Somers
- William V. Mong as Snoop Jenkins, aka The Rat
- Norval MacGregor as Captain Nathaniel Somers
- Sidney D'Albrook as Crimp Sherman
- J.P. Lockney as Jason West
