= The Mutiny of the Elsinore (1936 film) =

1936 film by Pierre Chenal

- Directed by: Pierre Chenal
- Written by: Marcel Aymé; Christian Stengel; Pierre Chenal
- Based on: The Mutiny of the Elsinore by Jack London
- Produced by: Christian Stengel
- Starring: Jean Murat; Winna Winifried; André Berley
- Cinematography: André Bac; Christian Matras; Joseph-Louis Mundwiller
- Edited by: Pierre Chenal
- Music by: Arthur Honegger
- Production company: Général Productions
- Distributed by: Les Grands Spectacles Cinématographiques
- Release date: 29 February 1936
- Running time: 90 minutes
- Country: France
- Language: French

The Mutiny of the Elsinore (French: Les mutinés de l'Elseneur) is a 1936 French action film directed by Pierre Chenal and starring Jean Murat, Winna Winifried and André Berley. It was an adaptation of the 1914 novel The Mutiny of the Elsinore by Jack London. The film's sets were designed by the art director Aimé Bazin.

== Synopsis ==
A journalist takes command of a ship after the crew mutiny against the brutal captain.

== Cast ==
- Jean Murat as Jack Pathurst
- Winna Winifried as Winna West
- André Berley as Le lieutenant Pike
- Robert Le Vigan as Charles Davis
- Maurice Lagrenée as Bert Rhine
- Lucas Gridoux as O'Sullivan
- Jacques Berlioz as Le capitaine West
- Louis Gouget as Sundry Buyers
- François Viguier as Larry
- Eugène Stuber as Murphy
- Max Dalban as Tom Spink
- Raymond Segard as Henri, le pilotin
- Tsugundo Maki as Wada, le cuisinier chinois
- Jacques Henley as L'éditeur
- Guy Sloux as Le secrétaire
- Louis Robur as Twist
- Charbonnier as Shorty
- René Génin as Le cabaretier
- Raymond Aimos as Un marin
- Roger Blin as Un marin

== Bibliography ==
- Goble, Alan. The Complete Index to Literary Sources in Film. Walter de Gruyter, 1999.
- Oscherwitz, Dayna & Higgins, MaryEllen. The A to Z of French Cinema. Scarecrow Press, 2009.
