= The Mutiny of the Elsinore (1937 film) =

1937 film

- Directed by: Roy Lockwood
- Written by: Beaufoy Milton; Walter Summers
- Based on: The Mutiny of the Elsinore by Jack London
- Produced by: John Argyle
- Starring: Lyn Harding; Paul Lukas; Kathleen Kelly
- Cinematography: Bryan Langley
- Edited by: F.H. Bickerton
- Music by: Guy Jones
- Production company: John Argyle Productions
- Distributed by: Associated British Film Distributors
- Release date: 3 September 1937
- Running time: 79 minutes
- Country: United Kingdom
- Language: English

The Mutiny of the Elsinore (also known as Jack London's Mutiny of the Elsinore) is a 1937 British action film directed by Roy Lockwood and starring Lyn Harding, Paul Lukas and Kathleen Kelly. It was written by Beaufoy Milton and Walter Summers, adapted from the 1914 novel The Mutiny of the Elsinore by Jack London. It was shot at Welwyn Studios in Hertfordshire, and on location on board the Padua at Funchal. The film's sets were designed by the art director Duncan Sutherland. The screenplay concerns a mutiny on a ship against a brutal captain.

== Plot summary ==
Following a mutiny on a ship against a brutal mate, a writer who happens to be aboard as a passenger is asked to take over after the murder of the Captain.

== Cast ==
- Lyn Harding as Mr Pike
- Jiro Soneya as Wada
- Paul Lukas as Jack Pethurst
- Kathleen Kelly as Margaret West
- Graham Soutten as Sidney Waltham
- Michael Martin Harvey as Charles Davis
- Clifford Evans as Bert Rhyne
- Conway Dixon as Captain West
- Tony Sympson as Shorty Peabody
- Pat Noonan as Murphy
- Alec Fraser as Benson
- Hamilton Keene as Twist
- William Devlin as O'Sullivan

== Reception ==
The Monthly Film Bulletin wrote: "While the story is exciting and direction achieves a fair amount of suspense the total effect is marred by many absurdities and inconsistencies ... The settings are inclined to be monotonous, and some of the photography is self-consciously 'arty.' The acting throughout is good."

The Daily Film Renter wrote: "Jack London story revolving round mutiny aboard windjammer on high seas. Realistic storm sequence, and robust mutiny, plus sundry killings, offer good hearty dramatics. ... Lyn Harding as brutal first mate, and Paul Lukas as novelist seeking local colour top acting performances, and attractive locations include seascapes of great beauty. Full-blooded offering for masses."
