= Vyacheslav Mescherin =

Soviet-Russian musician (1923–1995)

Vyacheslav Valerianovich Mescherin Вячеслав Валерианович Мещерин
- Born: 30 June 1923; Moscow, Russian SFSR, Soviet Union (present-day Russia)
- Died: 6 October 1995 (aged 72); Moscow, Russia
- Genres: Space age pop, easy listening
- Occupation(s): Composer, arranger, keyboardist, conductor
- Instrument(s): Synthesizer, piano
- Years active: 1957–1990

Vyacheslav Valerianovich Mescherin (Note: Russian: Вячеслав Валерианович Мещерин, romanized: Vyacheslav Valerianovich Meshcherin) (30 June 1923 – 6 October 1995) was a Soviet and Russian musician and composer, founder of Vyacheslav Mescherin's Orchestra of Electronic Instruments that performed space age pop and easy listening music.

== Biography ==
A veteran of World War II, Vyacheslav received Order of the Red Star and Medal "For Courage". After the war, Mescherin graduated from Gnessin State Musical College and worked on the radio. In 1957 he founded the Orchestra of Electronic Instruments, also informally known as the Vyacheslav Mescherin Orchestra. The orchestra used various electronic instruments, such as theremins, electronic organs and early synthesisers. Vyacheslav composed some of the music, but also arranged electronic versions of folk tunes and Western songs, such as Bimbo Jet and Popcorn.

Initial critical reaction in conservative Soviet media was mixed; a newspaper parody article joked that "Mescherin makes clothes irons play Tchaikovsky's Concerto No. 1". But with time, Mescherin conquered a wider fan base and received many state awards, including the title of People's Artist of the RSFSR. Yuri Gagarin, the first human in space, was a fan of the Orchestra. Alexey Leonov stated: "The music of electric musical instruments perfectly corresponds to the state that I experienced in outer space. Mescherin's music was often used as a background in elevators and waiting halls, as well as on television. Many of his compositions were included in popular animated series Well, Just You Wait! and the 1959 science fiction film Nebo Zovyot. The Mescherin Orchestra remained active until 1990.

The Vyacheslav Mescherin Orchestra had produced over 1,000 music tracks, all of which are archived in the old Soviet Sound Recording Museum in Moscow. Mescherin's music has been collected in two albums entitled Easy USSR Volumes I and II (1960s and 1970s, and 1970s and 1980s, respectively), which became the subject of the BBC Radio 4 documentary Tim Key's Easy USSR in which Tim Key explains his obsession with Mescherin’s music.
