= Charles Nuetzel =

American author (born 1934)

Charles Alexander Nuetzel
- Born: November 10, 1934 (age 91); San Francisco, California, U.S.
- Occupations: Author, publisher
- Writing career
- Genres: science fiction, crime fiction, erotica

Charles Alexander Nuetzel is an American author and publisher, primarily of science fiction, thrillers, and erotica. He has written as Charles Nuetzel and numerous pseudonyms, including Mark Allen, Blake Andrews, Albert Augustus Jr., Jack Belmont, Alex Blake, Fredric Blake, J. D. Blake, Rex Charles, John Davidson, Carson Davis, Fred Davis, Jay Davis, Jack Donaldson, Charles English, Frank Ewing, Don Franklin, Donald Franklyn, George Frederics, Howard Jackson, Fritz Jantzen, David Johnson, Hal Lambert, Frank MacDonald, Fred MacDonald, Alec Rivere, Stu Rivers, Jack Turner, Jay West, and Rita Wilde.

== Biography ==
Nuetzel was born November 10, 1934, in San Francisco, California, one of twin sons of commercial artist Albert Augustus Nuetzel (1901–1969) and Betty (Stockberger) Nuetzel (1910–1973). His twin brother, Albert Augustus Nuetzel Jr., died two days after birth. The family moved to Southern California when Nuetzel was eight. He was pointed in the way of his future career through early interest in Edgar Rice Burroughs and later a chance meeting with Ray Bradbury, which resulted in his acquaintance with the man who would become his agent, Forrest J. Ackerman. He attended San Fernando Valley State College for one semester and subsequently worked in various professions, including pop singer and film technician. In 1962, Nuetzel married Brigitte Marianne Winter.

== Literary career ==
Nuetzel was active literarily for eleven years, from 1960 to 1971, and again briefly from 2006 to 2008, when Borgo Press, an imprint of Wildside Press, reissued much of his backfile along with a number of previously unpublished or new works, and 2012–2015, when many of his works were reissued through Haldolen Press.

From 1960 onward, Nuetzel began publishing short stories and novels under numerous pseudonyms, as well as under his own name. A self-styled hack author, he aspired to be a pulp writer, only to be informed that pulp was dead, and sleazy erotica was the current equivalent; much of his early work was directed to that market, and many of his stories in general have a more or less pronounced erotic overtone. Many of the books he wrote or packaged bore cover images produced by his father Albert Nuetzel, or Nuetzell, as he was often credited.

His first published science fiction story was "A Very Cultured Taste" (1960, in Jade Magazine). His best-known works in that genre include his Edgar Rice Burroughs-influenced planetary romances, all originally published in 1969; Warriors of Noomas, Raiders of Noomas, Swordsman of Vistar, and The Slaves of Lomooro (as by Albert Augustus Jr.), the Lost Race novel Lost City of the Damned (1961, as by Alec Rivere), the future-sex novel Lovers: 2017 (1964, as by Charles English), the dystopian film tie-in Queen of Blood (1966), and the satirical short story collection Images of Tomorrow (1969).

Nuetzel also worked as an agent, editor, packager, and publisher. He helped found the paperback publisher Powell Books, and edited its science fiction imprint (Powell Science Fiction); he was also established his own firm, NAC Publications (NAC stemming from his own initials in reverse order). Both lines included some of his own works, often issued under pen names. By 1971, when Nuetzel retired from writing, he had published over 70 novels and over 100 short stories.

Many of his scattered or obscurely published stories and novels were reissued, some as e-books, starting in 2006, along with some previously unpublished and original works. His autobiography, Pocketbook Writer: Confessions of Commercial Hack, appeared in 2008.

== Bibliography ==
=== Noomas series ===
- Raiders of Noomas (Powell Publications, 1969)
- Warriors of Noomas (Powell Publications, 1969)
- Slavegirl of Noomas (Wildside Press, 2008, with Heidi Garrett)
- Conquest of Noomas (Wildside Press, 2013, with Heidi Garrett)
- Torlo Hannis of Noomas (Borgo Press/Wildside Press, 2007, omnibus of Raiders of Noomas and Warriors of Noomas)

=== Other novels ===
- Lost City of the Damned (Pike Books, 1961, as Alec Rivere, 2006 under own name; condensed as "Jungle Safari" in Jungle Jungle (1969))
- Love Me to Death (1961, as Alex Blake)
- Softly as I Kill You (1961, as John Davidson, 2006 under own name)
- Two Timing Tart (1961, as John Davidson)
- Blues for a Dead Lover (1962, as John Davidson, 2006 under own name)
- Motel Mistress (1962, as John Davidson)
- One Hundred Dollar Call-Girl (1962, as Hal Lambert)
- Sex Is My Business (1962, as John Davidson, 2007 under own name)
- Tropic of Passion (1962, as John Davidson; collected in Tropic of Passion & Amazon Gold Fever (2006)
- Jungle Nymph (1964, as David Johnson, 2006 under own name; collected (as "Jungle Goddess" in Jungle Jungle (1969))
- Lovers: 2075 (NAC Publications/Scorpion Books, 1964, as Charles English; collected in Images of Tomorrow (1969); revised as The Ersatz (collected in The Ersatz and The Talisman (Wildeside Press, 2006); published as a singleton 2012)
- Nobody Loves a Tramp (1964, as Alex Blake)
- Sex Queen (1964, as Stu Rivers, 2007 under own name)
- Murder Times 4 (1965)
- Never In Her Arms (1965, as John Davidson, 2007 under own name)
- Sex on Fire (1965, as John Davidson; as Goldlust (Powell Publications, 1969, as Albert Augustus Jr.); as Gold Lust (2006, under own name)
- Bikini Girl (1966, as Jay West)
- Parley in Passion (1965, as Fred MacDonald, 2006 under own name)
- Queen of Blood (Greenleaf Classics, 1966, movie tie-in)
- Star Bitch (1967, as Don Franklin, 2007 under own name)
- Blowout! (1968, as Donald Franklyn)
- Born to Be Loved (1969, as Fred Davis, 2006 under own name)
- Hollywood Mysteries (1969)
- Krista (1969, as Fred MacDonald)
- The Slaves of Lomooro (Powell Publications, 1969, as Albert Augustus Jr.; 2007 under own name)
- Swordmen of Vistar (Powell Publications, 1969)
- Adapt or Die (1969; Borgo Press/Wildside Press, 2006)
- Last Call for the Stars (Lennox Hill Press, 1970)
- Bodies 4 Sale (?, as John Davidson, 2006 under own name)
- Syndicate Woman (?, as John Davidson, 2007 under own name)
- The Body Merchants (?, as John Davidson, 2007 under own name)
- One Summer of Love (2006)
- The Epic Dialogs of Mhyo: An Adult Fairy Tale (Borgo Press/Wildside Press, 2006)
- The Sex Cult Murders (2006)
- Murder Most Terrible (2006, as Fred MacDonald)
- Jean (2007, as Fred MacDonald)
- "Amazon Gold Fever" (?, as Albert Augustus Jr, 2013 under own name)
- Any One Can Die (?, as George Frederics, 2006 under own name) suspense thriller
- Operation: Double Cross (?, as George Frederics, 2006 under own name)
- Midnight Lovers (?, as Stu Rivers, 2006 under own name)
- The Casting Couchers (?, as Stu Rivers, 2006 under own name; collected in Hollywood After Midnight (2015))
- Hollywood Nymph (?, as Stu Rivers, 2006 under own name; collected in Hollywood After Midnight (2015))
- Long Dead Road (2014, as by Jack Turner, with Andy Conway)

=== Collections ===
- Images of Tomorrow (Powell Publications, 1969)
- Jungle Jungle (Powell Publications, 1969)
- Dimensions: Stores of the Past, Present, and Future (Wildside Press, 2006)
- The Ersatz and The Talisman: Two Tales of an Uncertain Future (Wildside Press, 2006)
- Fluff (2006)
- Mistress of the Damned and Death in her Arms (2006)
- Tropic of Passion & Amazon Gold Fever: Two Tales of Jungle Adventure (2006)
- Master of the House (2007)
- The Homo Sap Plus Four (2012)
- Lost Worlds of Charles Neutzel (2012)
- Love Me To Death (2012, omnibus of Murder Times 4, Syndicate Woman, Death in Her Arms, Sex Cult Murders, and Murder Most Terrible)
- Merchants of Death (2012, omnibus of Anyone Can Die [George Fredrics], Operation: Double Cross, and Mistress of the Damned)
- Show-Biz Craze (2012, omnibus of Bodies for Sale, Midnight Lovers, Blues for a Dead Lover, and Sex Queen)
- Show-Biz Gangland Style (2012 omnibus of Born to be Loved, The Body Merchants, and Hollywood Nymph)
- 3 New Dimensional Worlds (2012, omnibus of Far Side of Paradise, Beneficiaries and Those Who Watch)
- 2 Westerns + 1 (2012, omnibus of Plague From the Past [Fred MacDonald], The Stand Off, and End of a Town)
- Vegas Last Laugh Plus One (2013, omnibus of Vegas Last Laugh and Shark Bait [John Davidson])
- Wanton Lovers (2012, omnibus of Jean, Krista, One Summer of Love and Parley in Passion)
- Night Games (2013, omnibus of Star Bitch, Never in Her Arms, Witch of Hollywood and Drink Deep of Revenge)
- Hollywood After Midnight (2015, omnibus of Hollywood Mysteries, The Casting Couchers, and Hollywood Nymph, plus five short stories)
- Ten Science Fiction Nightmares (2015)

=== Short stories ===
- "A Very Cultured Taste" (1960, as George Frederic)
- "Drink Deep of Revenge" (1963)
- "Plague of the Past" (1963)
- "Planet of the Love Feast" (1963, as George Frederick)
- "Shark Bait" (1963)
- "The End of a Town" (1963)
- "The Stand-Off" (1963)
- "The Witch of Hollywood" (1963, collected in Hollywood After Midnight (2015))
- "Party Business" (?, collected in Hollywood After Midnight (2015)
- "The Stand In" (?, collected in Hollywood After Midnight (2015)
- "The Casting Couch" (?, collected in Hollywood After Midnight (2015)
- "Frozen Smiles and Glad Hands (?, collected in Hollywood After Midnight (2015)
- "Vegas Last Laugh" (1963)
- "Guided Tour" (1965, collected in The Homo Sap Plus Four (2012))
- "Hunger Pangs" (1965, collected in The Homo Sap Plus Four (2012))
- "The Good Doctor" (1965, collected in The Homo Sap Plus Four (2012))
- "The Homo Sap" (1965, collected in The Homo Sap Plus Four (2012))
- "Word to the Wise" (1965, collected in The Homo Sap Plus Four (2012))
- "Count Down to Doom" (1966, with Forrest J. Ackerman)
- "Garcia’s Mistress" (1969)
- "The World That WOMB Made" (1969)
- "Images of Man" (1969)
- "Mission of Mercy" (1969)
- "Royal Lesson" (1969)
- "The Judgment" (1969)
- "Jungle Goddess" (?, collected in Jungle Jungle (1969))
- "Jungle Safari" (?, collected in Jungle Jungle (1969))
- "The Nova Incident" (1969)
- "A Day for Dying" (1969)
- "Amazon Gold Fever" (?, collected in Tropic of Passion & Amazon Gold Fever, 2006)
- "The Talisman" (2006)
- "Beneficiaries" (2006)
- "Far Side of Paradise" (2006)
- "Master of the House" (2006)
- "Mission of Mercy" (2006)
- "Those Who Watch" (2006)

=== Nonfiction ===
- Whodunit? Hollywood style (1965; revised as Hollywood Mysteries (1969) and True Stories of Scandal and Hollywood Mysteries (2006))
- Pocketbook Writer: Confessions of Commercial Hack (2008)
- Egomania: Essays & Other Writings (2013)
- Seven Days in Maui: A Photo Essay Revealed (2013)

=== Anthologies edited ===
- If This Goes On (Book Company of America, 1965)
