= Nebo Zovyot =

1959 Soviet science fiction film

- Theatrical release poster
- Directed by: Mikhail Karyukov; Aleksandr Kozyr
- Screenplay by: Aleksei Sazonov; Yevgeni Pomeshchikov; Mikhail Karyukov
- Produced by: Valery Fokin
- Cinematography: Nikolai Kulchitsky
- Edited by: L. Mkhitaryyanch
- Music by: Yuliy Meitus, performed by Vyacheslav Mescherin
- Production company: Dovzhenko Film Studios
- Release date: September 12, 1959 (USSR)
- Running time: 77 minutes
- Country: Soviet Union
- Language: Russian

Nebo Zovyot (Russian: «Небо зовёт», lit. 'The Sky Beckons or The Heavens Beckon', Ukrainian: «Небо кличе», romanized: Nebo klyche) is a 1959 Soviet science fiction adventure film directed by Aleksandr Kozyr and Mikhail Karyukov. It was filmed at Dovzhenko Film Studios in 1959 and premiered September 12, 1959. In 1962, an Americanized edit was released entitled Battle Beyond the Sun under the direction of Roger Corman in collaboration with recent film school graduate Francis Ford Coppola dubbed in English.

== Synopsis ==
A Soviet scientific expedition is being prepared as the world's first mission to planet Mars. Their space ship Homeland has been built at a space station, where the expedition awaits the command to start.

An American ship Typhoon experiencing mechanical problems arrives at the same space station, secretly having the same plans for the conquest of the Red Planet. Trying to stay ahead of the Soviets, they start without proper preparation, and soon are again in distress.

The Homeland changes course to save the crew of Typhoon. They succeed, but find that their fuel reserves are now insufficient to get to Mars. So Homeland makes an emergency landing on the asteroid Icarus passing near Mars, on which they are stranded.

After an attempt to send a fuel supply by uncrewed rocket fails, another ship Meteor is sent with a cosmonaut on a possibly suicidal mission, to save the stranded cosmonauts.

== Cast ==
- Ivan Pereverzev — scientist Eugene Kornev
- Alexander Shvoryn — engineer Andrey Gordienko
- Constantine Bartashevich — astronaut Robert Clark
- Gurgen Tonunts — astronaut Erwin Verst
- Valentin Chernyak — cosmonaut Gregory Somov
- Viktor Dobrovolsky — space station chief Vasily Demchenko
- Alexandra "Alla" Popova — Vera Korneva
- Taisia Litvinenko — doctor Lena
- Larisa Borisenko — student Olga
- Leo Lobov — cameraman Sasha
- Sergey Filimonov — writer Troyan
- Maria Samoilov — Clark's mother
- Mikhail Belousov — ( uncredited )

== Crew ==
- Screenwriters — Alexei Sazonov, Evgeniya Pomeschikov
  with the participation of — Mikhael Karyukov
- Consultants — corresponding Member of the USSR Academy of Sciences — Abnir Yakovkin, Engineer Aleksandr Borin
- Production Director - Valeri Fokin
- Story Editors — Renata Korol, A. Pereguda
- Staging directors — Mikhael Karyukov, Aleksandr Kozyr
- Art director - Tatiana Kulchitskaya
- Chief Artist — Timofej Liauchuk
- Sets director — Yuri Shvets
- Costume Artist — G. Glinkova
- Makeup artist — E. Odinovich
- Special Effects Directors — Franz Semyannikov, N. Ilyushin
- Special Effects Art Directors — Yuri Shvets, G. Loukashov
- Director of photography — Nikolai Kulchitskii
- Sound engineer — Georgij Parahnikov
- Film Editor — L. Mkhitaryants
- Composer — Julij Meitus
- USSR State Orchestra
  Conductor — Veniamin Tolba
- Экспериментальный ансамбль электромузыкальных инструментов
  (Experimental Electronic Music Ensemble)
  Orchestra Director — Vyacheslav Mescherin

== Battle Beyond the Sun (U.S. release) ==
In 1962, Roger Corman invited film school student Francis Ford Coppola to produce an English-language version of the film, rights to which Corman had acquired for U.S. release, entitled; Battle Beyond the Sun. In addition to preparing a dubbing script in American English, Coppola edited out all references to the U.S./Soviet conflict from the dialogue, blotted out all the Cyrillic writing on the various spacecraft and superimposed neutral designs, replaced shots showing models and paintings of Soviet spacecraft with scenes showing NASA ones, replaced the names of all the actors with made-up names which had their first letters identical to those of the players (and thus turning Taisiya Litvinenko into a man, Thomas Littleton), and inserted a scene with monsters on Mars's moon Phobos. In all, the resulting film edit is 13 minutes shorter than the original. The film was distributed by American International Pictures.

Some space scenes from Nebo Zovyot also appear in Corman's 1965 film Voyage to the Prehistoric Planet. (Most of the scenes in that film though were taken from another Soviet science-fiction film, Planeta Bur).

== Related facts ==
Nebo Zovyot was released two years after the launch of the first artificial satellite Sputnik 1 and two years before the first crewed flight into space by Yuri Gagarin.

Stanley Kubrick's 1968 film 2001: A Space Odyssey used drawings and graphics solutions from Nebo Zovyot created by the fiction artist Yuri Shvets.

Nebo Zovyot was re-released in Germany as Der Himmel ruft on June 15, 2009. Furthermore, the film was officially translated into Hungarian and Italian.

In the film the fictional Soviet spaceship Rodina (Russian: Родина, Motherland) landed vertically on floating landing platform in Yalta harbour, similar to SpaceX CRS-8 landing on April 8, 2016, (with SpaceX having successfully accomplished their first vertical landing recovery of a first stage booster as a return to launch site during Flight 20 of Falcon 9 on December 21, 2015).
