= Pierre Chenal =

French film director (1904–1990)

- Born: Pierre Cohen; 5 December 1904; Brussels, Belgium
- Died: 23 December 1990 (aged 86); Paris, France
- Other name: Dave Young
- Occupations: Director, screenwriter
- Years active: 1929–1985
- Spouse: Florence Marly (1937–1955)

Pierre Chenal (French: [ʃənal]; 5 December 1904 – 23 December 1990) was a French director and screenwriter who flourished in the 1930s. He was married to Czech-born French film actress Florence Marly from 1937 to 1955.

== Work ==
Chenal was best known for film noir thrillers such as the 1937 film L'Alibi, where he worked with Erich von Stroheim and Louis Jouvet. In 1939 he made Le Dernier Tournant, the first of many film treatments of James M. Cain's celebrated novel, The Postman Always Rings Twice.

Chenal was Jewish and was forced in 1942 to flee occupied France with his wife, Czech actress Florence Marly, for South America. He made a number of films while living in Argentina and more in France after the war; but his post-war work never achieved the success and popularity of his pre-war efforts.

== Filmography ==
- Fat Man's Worries (1933)
- Street Without a Name (1934)
- Crime and Punishment (1935)
- The Mutiny of the Elsinore (1936)
- The Former Mattia Pascal (1937)
- The Man from Nowhere (1937)
- The Alibi (1937)
- The Lafarge Case (1938)
- Sirocco (1938)
- The Last Turning (1939)
- Todo un hombre (1943)
- The Corpse Breaks a Date (1944)
- The Abyss Opens (1945)
- Devil and the Angel (1946)
- Viaje sin regreso (1946)
- Clochemerle (1948)
- Native Son (1951)
- The Idol (1952)
- Confession at Dawn (1954)
- Missing Persons Section (1956)
- Sinners of Paris (1957)
- Dangerous Games (1958)
- Beast at Bay (1959)
- The Night They Killed Rasputin (1960)
- The Murderer Knows the Score (1963)
- Les belles au bois dormantes (1970)

== Bibliography ==
- Chenal, Pierre, Souvenirs du cinéaste, filmographie, temoignages, documents (Collection 24 souvenirs/seconde), [Autobiography, French Edition, Paperback], Dujarric, en collaboration avec les Amis de Ciné-sous-Bois, Aulnay-sous-Bois, 1987, ISBN 2-85947-043-3
- Chenal, Pierre, La dernière tempête (L'Aventure vécue), [French Edition, Paperback], Flammarion, Paris, 1975, ISBN 2-08-065015-7
