= A Dream Come True =

Studio album by Becky Taylor
- Released: 2001
- Recorded: February–April 2001
- Label: EMI

Becky Taylor chronology
A Dream Come True (2001)	Shine (2004)

Singles from A Dream Come True
- 1. "Song of Dreams" Released: 2001

A Dream Come True is a studio album by English singer Becky Taylor, released in 2001 by EMI.

== Recordimg ==
The album was recorded in February–April 2001 and arranged by Simon Hale. Among the recording locations were Abbey Road Studios, London.

== Release and chart performance ==
The album was released on CD in the UK in mid-2001. It also spawned a CD single titled "Song of Dreams", that preceded it on the UK charts appearing at No. 60 on the week ending 16 June 2001.

The album itself debuted at No. 67 on the official UK albums chart for the week ending 23 June before dropping to No. 76 in its second week and then falling off entirely.

AllMusic gives the US release date as 11 September 2001.

== Critical reception ==
Professional ratings
Review scores
Source	Rating
AllMusic	4/5 stars
Billboard	(no rating)

The US Billboard magazine reviewed the album in the 29 September 2001 issue. The reviewer noted that the singer recorded the CD at 12 and that the songs on it were mostly from "youth-oriented" films and musicals. He opined that her soprano, while "hit[ting] the right notes", was "often breathess and sibilant" and lacked "the emotional depth needed to tackle [deep] material" like "Not While I'm Around" and "Over the Rainbow". Nevertheless, he enjoyed how her vocals "brim[med] with cheer", pointed out that "her sheer enthusiasm" was "enough to sell [...] straightforward, bright number[s]" like "I'm Flying" from the musical Peter Pan, and commended "her raw talent".

AllMusic rates the album 4 on a scale of 5.

== Track listing ==
CD (EMI 7243 5 57142 20)
No.	Title	Writer(s)	Length
1.	"Just Beyond the Stars" (Peter Pan)	Anthony Drewe, George Stiles	4:37
2.	"Once Upon a December" (Anastasia)	Lynn Ahrens, Stephen Flaherty	3:01
3.	"Over the Rainbow" (The Wizard of Oz)	E.Y. "Yip" Harburg, Harold Arlen	4:10
4.	"I'm Flying" (Peter Pan)	Carolyn Leigh, Mark "Moose" Charlap	2:11
5.	"Whistle Down the Wind" (Whistle Down the Wind)	Andrew Lloyd Webber, Jim Steinman	4:09
6.	"A Handful of Songs" (Beat Girl)	Lionel Bart, Michael Pratt, Tommy Steele	1:42
7.	"Song of Dreams" (specially written for Becky)	Claire Moore, Simon Hale	3:58
8.	"I Could Have Danced All Night" (My Fair Lady)	Alan Jay Lerner, Frederick Loewe	2:33
9.	"Not While I'm Around" (Sweeney Todd)	Stephen Sondheim	2:00
10.	"Someone's Waiting for You" (The Rescuers)	Ayn Robbins, Carol Connors, Sammy Fain	4:04
11.	"Thank You, Stars" (Watership Down)	Mike Batt	3:41
12.	"Stay Awake" (Mary Poppins)	Richard M. Sherman, Robert B. Sherman	3:05
13.	"Raindrops Keep Falling on My Head" (Butch Cassidy and the Sundance Kid)	Burt Bacharach, Hal David	3:14
14.	"Winter Light" (The Secret Garden)	Eric Kaz, Linda Ronstadt, Zbigniew Preisner	3:53

== Personnel ==
- Simon Hale – musical direction, musical arrangements

== Charts ==
Chart (2001)	Peak position
UK Albums (Official Charts)	67
