= Acario Cotapos Baeza =

Chilean composer

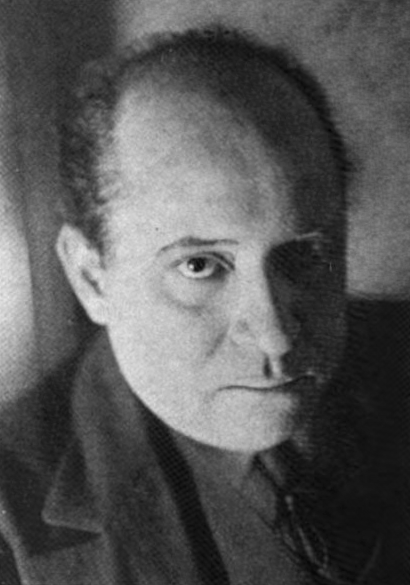
- Born: 30 April 1889; Valdivia, Chile
- Died: 22 November 1969 (aged 80); Santiago, Chile
- Occupation: Composer

Acario Cotapos Baeza (30 April 1889 – 22 November 1969) was a Chilean composer. He won the National Prize of Art of Chile in 1960.
