= Asimov (disambiguation) =

Isaac Asimov (1920–1992) was a writer.

Asimov may also refer to:

== People ==
- Stanley Asimov, Isaac Asimov's brother.
- Eric Asimov, Isaac Asimov's nephew.

Places

- Asimov (crater), an impact crater on Mars, named after Isaac Asimov
- 5020 Asimov, an asteroid named after Isaac Asimov

Other

- Asimov (surname)
- Asimov's Science Fiction, an American science fiction magazine named after Isaac Asimov
- Asimov's SF Adventure Magazine, a short-lived American science fiction magazine named after Isaac Asimov
- Isaac Asimov Awards, four separate awards established in honor of Isaac Asimov

== See also ==
- ASIMO
- Azimov, Russian last name
