= Asimov (surname) =

Asimov is a Jewish surname of Russian origin; see "Isaac Asimov#Surname" for its genesis. Notable people with the surname include:

- Isaac Asimov (1920–1992), American essayist, scientist, novelist, written commentator, science fiction writer
  - Janet Asimov (1926–2019), American science fiction writer, psychiatrist, psychoanalyst, wife of Isaac
  - Stanley Asimov (1929–1995), American journalist and newspaper executive, former vice-president for editorial administration at Newsday, brother of Isaac
    - Eric Asimov (born 1957), American wine critic, son of Stanley
    - Daniel A. Asimov, mathematician, son of Stanley
    - Nanette Asimov (born c. 1959), American journalist for the San Francisco Chronicle, daughter of Stanley
- Morris Asimow (1906–1982), American educator, professor of Systems engineering at UCLA, pioneer of the Engineering design process

== See also ==
- Azimov, a related last name
- Ashimov, a Kazakh and Slavic surname
