= Voyage to the Planet of Prehistoric Women =

1968 American science fiction film

- Title card
- Directed by: Pavel Klushantsev (original Planeta Bur footage); Peter Bogdanovich (as Derek Thomas)
- Written by: Henry Ney
- Produced by: Norman D. Wells; Roger Corman
- Starring: Mamie Van Doren; Mary Marr; Paige Lee; Irene Orton
- Narrated by: Peter Bogdanovich
- Cinematography: Flemming Olsen
- Edited by: Bob Collins
- Music by: Keith Benjamin
- Production company: The Filmgroup
- Distributed by: AIP-TV
- Release date: 1968
- Running time: 78 minutes
- Country: United States
- Language: English

Voyage to the Planet of Prehistoric Women is a 1968 American science fiction film, one of two films whose footage was taken from the 1962 Soviet SF film Planeta Bur (Planet of Storms) for producer Roger Corman. The original film was scripted by Alexander Kazantsev from his novel and directed by Pavel Klushantsev. This adaptation, made by Peter Bogdanovich, who chose not to have his name credited on the film, included new scenes added that starred Mamie Van Doren. The film apparently had at least a limited U.S. release through American International Pictures, but became better known via subsequent cable TV showings and home video sales. The film contains no footage from Planeta Bur that was not used in the earlier Voyage to the Prehistoric Planet (1965).

== Plot ==
Astronauts who have landed on Venus kill a flying creature that resembles a pterosaur, unaware that it is worshipped as a god by a small band of blond Venusian women whom they never meet. In revenge, the women attempt to kill the astronauts, but the astronauts survive, eventually successfully making an emergency blast off from Venus. Their abandoned and damaged robot, which was caught in a flow of volcanic mud and ultimately shut down by the humans, is adopted as the women's new god.

== Cast ==
=== Venus women ===
- Mamie Van Doren as Moana
- Mary Marr as Verba
- Paige Lee as Twyla
- Judy Cowart
- Margot Hartman as Mayaway
- Irene Orton as Meriama
- Pam Helton as Wearie
- Frankie Smith as woman of Venus
- Robin Smith
- Adele Valentine

=== Earth men ===
- Aldo Romani as Astronaut Andre Freneau
- James David as Capt. Alfred Kern
- Roberto Martelli (Vladimir Yemelyanov) as Capt. William Lockhart
- Ralph Phillips (Yuri Sarantsev) as Astronaut Howard Sherman
- Murray Gerard (Georgiy Zhzhonov) as Astronaut Hans Walters
- Robot John

== Production ==
The film was known at one stage as Gill Women of Venus.

It was the last film made by the Filmgroup company.

Of the production, Bogdanovich has stated:

[Planeta Bur] was a Russian science-fiction film that Roger [Corman] had called Storm Clouds of Venus that he had dubbed into English. And he came to me and said, "Would you shoot some footage with some girls? AIP won't buy it unless we stick some girls in it". So I figured out a way to work some girls in it and shot for five days, and we cut it in. I narrated it, because nobody could make heads or tails of it. Roger wouldn't let me add any sound. It was just a little cheap thing we did, and people think I directed it when I really only directed 10 minutes of it.

Bogdanovich said he had to paint out the red star on the spaceship, "in every frame. We painted in some obscure symbol that might pass for the National Aeronautics and Space Administration".

Bogdanovich hired Mamie Van Doren and several other blondes to play Venusians "because I thought everyone should be blonde on Venus. I dressed them up in rubber suits, bottoms only and put shells over their breasts. I had them traipsing around Leo Carrillo Beach for a while shooting inserts that might relate to Venus". Bogdanovich says he gave the female characters "South Sea movie names" because "it seemed right".

One of the actresses was afraid of sharks and when she was in the water they threw her a rubber fish; she got hysterical, grabbed the fish and bit its head off. He said that people did not understand the film and its new sequences when first cut together, so he added narration. He decided one of the astronauts, "the best looking one", should narrate the film. Bogdanovich wrote the narration and provided the voice, and it was the one credit he took on the film.

Bogdanovich also stated he did not claim credit as director, because "such a small piece of it is mine", although in fact his adaptation of the Planeta Bur material had much more original material in it than the previous version, made by Curtis Harrington. His then-wife Polly Platt worked on the film as a production designer.

== Reception ==
In a retrospective on Soviet science fiction film, British director Alex Cox compared this version to the earlier Voyage to the Prehistoric Planet and called Voyage to the Planet of Prehistoric Women "equally classic".

Although the film review website FilmFanatic.org describes it as "a jarring mish-mosh of scenes" and "frightfully sub-par," it also claims "the storyline moves along at a quick enough pace that you’ll likely never be bored". Nigel Honeybone of HorrorNews.Net wrote that the film's scenes with Mamie Van Doren represented "Peter Bogdanovich’s stag film", and that producer Roger Corman had "made the Russian footage crappier, fulfilling his patriotic duty as an American".

Filmink magazine wrote, "This and Voyage to the Prehistoric Planet... use much of the same footage but Bogdanovich’s film is far superior: it’s simply better made."

== See also ==
- Voyage to the Prehistoric Planet, the other film which Roger Corman had made from Planeta Bur
- List of American films of 1968
- List of films featuring extraterrestrials
- List of films in the public domain in the United States
