= Admoni =

Admoni is a Jewish surname, which means "red" or "ruddy" in Hebrew. Notable people with the surname include:

- Johann Admoni (1906–1979), Russian composer
- Nahum Admoni (born 1929), Israeli intelligence officer
- Vladimir Admoni (1909–1993), Russian writer and translator
