= Voyage to the Prehistoric Planet =

- European DVD cover
- Directed by: Pavel Klushantsev; Curtis Harrington
- Written by: Aleksandr Kazantsev; Curtis Harrington
- Produced by: George Edwards; Roger Corman; Stephanie Rothman
- Starring: Basil Rathbone; Faith Domergue; Vladimir Yemelyanov; Georgiy Zhzhonov; Gennadi Vernov; Georgiy Teich; Yuri Sarantsev
- Cinematography: Arkadi Klimov; Vilis Lapenieks
- Edited by: Leo H. Shreve
- Music by: Ronald Stein
- Production company: The Filmgroup
- Distributed by: American International Television
- Release date: 1 August 1965
- Running time: 78 minutes
- Countries: Soviet Union; United States
- Language: English

The film

Voyage to the Prehistoric Planet is a 1965 science fiction film, one of two versions adapted for Roger Corman from the Soviet science fiction film Planeta Bur (Planet of Storms) of 1962, scripted by Aleksandr Kazantsev (from his novel) and directed by Pavel Klushantsev. Curtis Harrington oversaw the editing and dubbing of principal portions of the source film, and directed new principal scenes featuring Basil Rathbone and Faith Domergue. The resulting new film was syndicated directly to television by American International Television.

== Plot ==
The film essentially follows the storyline of the Soviet original, with Rathbone and Domergue replacing two Soviet actors in roles as space-station monitors of the primary action. The rest stars the remaining Soviet actors dubbed into English.

In this retelling, it is 2020 and the Moon has been colonized. After traveling 200,000,000 miles, the first group of men land on Venus, where they find a mist-shrouded prehistoric world in which the crew are attacked by various monstrous creatures and giant plants.

== Cast ==
- Basil Rathbone as Professor Hartman
- Faith Domergue as Dr. Marsha Evans
- Vladimir Yemelyanov (miscredited) as Cmdr. Brendan Lockhart
- Georgiy Zhzhonov (miscredited as "Kurt Boden") as Hans Walters
- Gennadi Vernov (miscredited as "Robert Chantal") as Andre Ferneau
- Georgiy Teich (miscredited) as Kern
- Yuri Sarantsev (miscredited) as Sherman
- Boris Prudkovsky (Note: 1964 USSR free wrestling champion.) (uncredited) as Robot John

== Production ==
Roger Corman purchased the rights to Planet of Storms (the Soviet film Planeta Bur) and used footage from Mechte Navstrechu (A Dream Come True), as well as footage from the Soviet science fiction film Nebo Zovyot (Battle Beyond the Sun). to create both Voyage to the Prehistoric Planet and Queen of Blood.

The American-made scenes were shot at the same time as Queen of Blood, another science fiction film directed by Harrington that was developed around the story of, and footage used from, Soviet science fiction films. Basil Rathbone and Faith Domergue shot their scenes in half a day wearing the same costumes and shot on the same set used for Queen of Blood.

Harrington later recalled: "It had to do with a couple of people orbiting the planet Venus. So, I had, instead of the Soviet actors, Faith Domergue orbiting the planet Venus. Then all the scenes with the Russians were dubbed in English. She was in touch with Basil Rathbone, who was supposedly on a Moon station. That’s all I shot. I shot about a day or two with her as she was in that ship orbiting around planet Venus. All the rest of it was just dubbed stuff".

While Harrington considered Queen of Blood good enough to keep his name on it, he is screen-credited on Voyage to the Prehistoric Planet as "John Sebastian", derived from Johann Sebastian Bach.

Stephanie Rothman worked on the film and Queen of Blood. "Curtis was very cordial, and I enjoyed watching him work and, you know, I learned something from watching how he functioned on the set, and how the production went along," said Rothman. "He was comfortable having me there and I was grateful to be there to learn from him."

== Reception ==
In a retrospective on Soviet science fiction film, British director Alex Cox called Voyage to the Prehistoric Planet "an act of cinematic cannibalism". Creature Feature gave the film 2 out of 5 stars, saying that it looked like it was spliced together with Elmer's Glue. Writing for AllMovie, critic Paul Gaita described the film as a "simplistic science fiction-adventure" that was "imaginative and highly visual" with "some impressive special effects".

== See also ==
- Voyage to the Planet of Prehistoric Women the other film adapted from material from Planeta Bur for Roger Corman
- List of American films of 1965
- List of films featuring dinosaurs
