= Asanali Ashimov =

Soviet actor and film director (1937–2025)

Asanälı Äşımov
- Асанәлі Әшімов
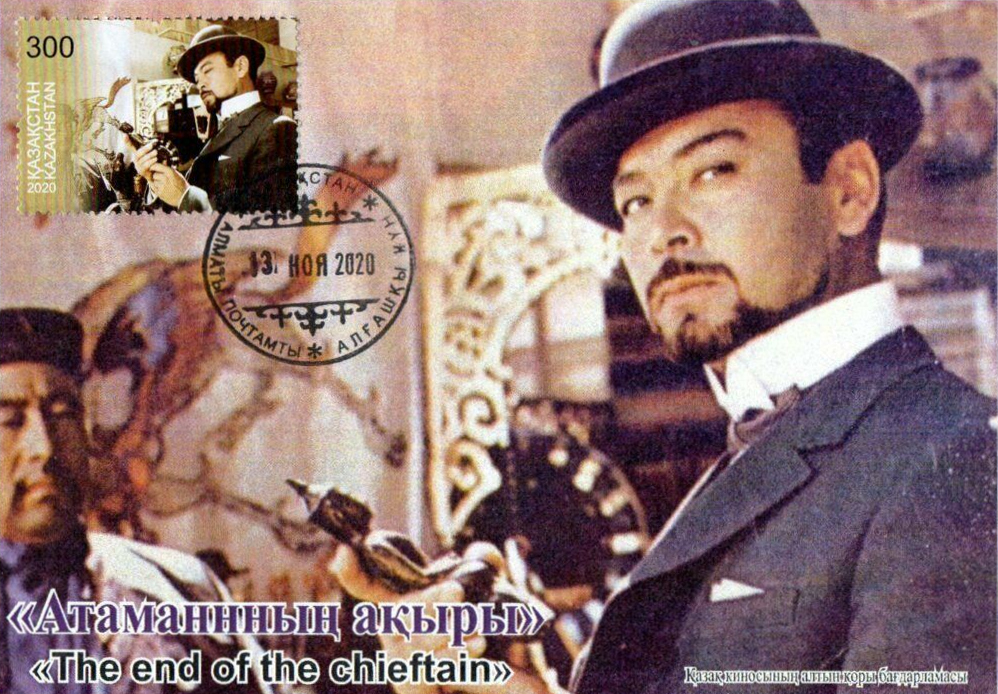
- Ashimov in The End of the Chieftain (1970) as depicted on a 2020 Kazakh stamp
- Born: 8 May 1937; Zhayilma settlement, Sarysu District, South Kazakhstan Region, Kazakh SSR, Soviet Kazakhstan
- Died: 21 December 2025 (aged 88); Kazakhstan
- Occupations: Actor; theater director; film director; drama coach; screenwriter
- Spouses: Mayra Aymanova (m. 1958; died 1993); Bagdat Ashimova (m. 2002)
- Children: 5

Asanälı Äşımūly Äşımov (Note: Often transliterated as Asanali Ashimovich Ashimov through a Russified Romanization of Асанали Ашимович Ашимов.) (Kazakh: Асанәлі Әшімұлы Әшімов; 8 May 1937 – 21 December 2025) was a Soviet and Kazakh actor, stage and screen director, screenwriter, educator and professor of drama.

== Early life and career ==
Ashimov was born in Bayqadam (or, according to other sources, Zhayilma) on 8 May 1937 Sarysu District, South Kazakhstan Region, Kazakh SSR.

Having graduated from Kazakh National Academy of Arts in Almaty as a theater drama actor in 1961, Ashimov started his career in the movie industry at Kazakhfilm Studios.

In 1963, he joined Auezov Kazakh Drama Theater in Almaty as an actor and later director. He also served as an Art Director at Auezov Theater.

Ashimov's success and recognition as an actor stemmed from his performance in such movies as The End of the Ataman by Shaken Aimanov, Trans-Siberian Express, Who Are You Mr. Ka? and Kyz-Zhibek.

Throughout his time at Auezov Theater, Ashimov was in 50 productions.

Ashimov taught at Kazakh National Academy of Arts named after Zhurgenev where he received a professorship.

He wrote the books Song of Mayra, Dedication, With Love Yours Asanali Ashimov.

== Personal life and death ==
Ashimov had two children with Mayra Aimanova, his first wife of 35 years, a Kazakh opera singer. Mayra died in 1993, and both children both died in 1999. Sagi was also a Kazakh actor.

His two next marriages did not last long. He had a son with his second wife and a daughter with his third wife.

In 2002 he married his fourth and last wife. They had a son.

Ashimov died on 21 December 2025, at the age of 88.

== Awards ==
Ashimov held numerous awards for his contribution to Kazakh and global culture, including the Hero of Labour of Kazakhstan and the Lomonosov Award.

== Legacy ==
In 2022, in honor of Ashimov's 85th birthday, Kazakhstan established a new award in the arts: the "Asanali". This prize will be awarded to the best actors, directors and screenwriters of the country.

In 2022, a bronze monument was erected in his honour on the territory of the Kazakhstan Business Cooperation Center Atakent.

== Filmography ==
Year	Title	Role	Notes
1957	Botagoz	Kenzhetay	
1959	On Irtysh Wild Shore	Zhanay Uralov	
1960	In One District	Dyusen Bektasov	
1961	Song's Calling	Toybazar	
1962	My Boy	Murat	
1962	Crossroads	Iskander	
1964	Traces Go Beyond the Horizon	Turar	
1966	Wings of Song	Kaymen	
1970	Kyz-Zhibek	Bekezhan	
1970	The End of the Ataman	Chadyarov	
1974	Waterfall	Mambet Usenov	
1975	Choice	Kozhamkul	
1976	The Throw, or Everything Started on Saturday	Professor	
1977	Trans-Siberian Express	Fan (Chadyarov)	
1979	The Taste of Bread	Kamal Aykenov	
1980	The Messengers Hurry	Karazhal	
1984	Chokan Valikhanov	Chingis Valikhanov	
1989	The Manchurian Option	Isizima (Chadyarov)	
2004	House at the Salt Lake	Galymzhan Zhanakov	
2009	Who Are You, Mr. Ka?	Ka Chen Wu (Chadyarov)	
