= Ashimov =

Ashimov (Kazakh: Әшімов; Kyrgyz: Ашимов; Russian: Ашимов) or Ashimova (feminine; Kazakh: Әшімова, Russian: Ашимова), is a Central Asian patronymic surname derived from the given name Ashim, a variant of Asem, with the Russian patronymic suffix '-ov'. Notable people with the surname include:

- Anna Ashimova (born 1973), Soviet child actress
- Asanali Ashimov (1937–2025), Soviet and Kazakh actor, film director and screenwriter
- Bayken Ashimov (1917–2010), Kazakh-Soviet politician
- Dinara Ashimova (born 1973), Kyrgyz politician
- Samet Ashimov (born 1979), Bulgarian footballer

== See also ==
- Asimov (surname), a Russian-Jewish surname
