= Virtual International Philharmonic =

- Official Virtual International Philharmonic logo
- Location: Lugano, Switzerland
- Owner: private
- Capacity: unlimited
- Type: Virtual Hall
- Event: all Genres

Construction
- Opened: 2009
- Renovated: Summer 2011
- Expanded: Autumn 2017

Website
- www.vilarmonia.expert

The Vìrtual Internàtional Phìlharmonic is a Virtual Hall registered from Lugano, Switzerland. It was founded in 2011 by the known St. Petersburg's composer, scientist-physicist, philosopher-agnostic, the writer and philanthropist Vladimir Anisimoff with his son Dmitry Anisimov, a mathematician at the USI. The Virtual International Philharmonic also has residence at Seminar of Amateur composers Hall, St. Petersburg, Russia. All concerts in the Virtual International Philharmonic are free of charge.

== History ==
=== St. Petersburg's musical salon ===
Russian physicist (magnetic resonance tomography) and composer, philanthropist Vladimir Anisimoff back in the 1990s established in St. Petersburg educational musical evenings. These musical concerts were held on Ostrovsky square, in the heart of the city, in Hall of Saint-Petersburg state theatre library.

From 1993 to 1997 there were regular concerts (one each two months) and performances of almost all the leading composers of St. Petersburg. There was music of Georgy Firtich, Andrey Petrov, Michail Zhuravlev, Felix Shevtsov, Alexander Sledin, Vladislav Uspensky, Radvilovich, Abram Ysfin and many other authors.

=== Support for new music ===
Since 2000 Vladimir Anisimoff actively supported materially and financially new directions of development of musical art. First of all he organized with the assistance of the composer Mikhail Zhuravlev a class of electronic music at the M.I.Glinka School of musical arts in St. Petersburg. Secondly, he had quite long supported the Horn orchestra of Russia and he often funded on behalf of the JSC NCI corp. concerts in Oak Hall of the St.Petersburg's House of Composers.

== The purpose of the Virtual International Philharmonic ==
At the beginning of 2010, the son Dmitry Anisimov of Vladimir Anisimoff moved to live and work in Lugano, Switzerland. Dmitry Anisimov became a mathematician in USI and together with Vladimir Anisimoff develop an international project to expand and promote musical works of contemporary composers.

Vladimir Anisimoff believes that music is like the air and should be available to all people

== Repertoire ==
All kinds of musical creativity including ballet, opera, symphony, sacred music and so on.

== New expanding ==
In autumn 2017, the website was renovated and redesigned to better support the goal of the project.

=== Music of composers ===
In the Virtual International Philharmonic (V.I.P.) Hall there is the music of the following living composers:

Maria Kalaniemi, Kaija Saariaho, Esa-Pekka Salonen, Elena Samarina, Aleksander Gonobolin, Vladimir Anisimoff, Anatoly Zarubko, Vasily Kabalin, Oleg Negrutsa, Sandro Gorli, Andrea Talmelli, Nicola Sani, Ludovico Einaudi, Anders Hillborg, Michel van der Aa, Nicolas Bacri, Anthony Girard, Pierre Henry, Ismo Lappalainen, Raymond Ebanks, group Bomfunk MC's

== Links ==
- Composer Vladimir Anisimoff - listen, download in mp3
- Composer Vladimir Anisimoff on Canadian Musiccentre (CMC)
- Composer Vladimir Anisimoff as member of Russian Tradition Association
