= Santa Fe Passage =

1955 film by William Witney

- Directed by: William Witney
- Screenplay by: Lillie Hayward
- Story by: Heck Allen
- Based on: Santa Fe Passage; 1952 story by Clay Fisher
- Produced by: Sidney Picker
- Starring: John Payne; Faith Domergue; Rod Cameron
- Cinematography: Bud Thackery
- Edited by: Tony Martinelli
- Music by: R. Dale Butts
- Color process: Trucolor
- Production company: Republic Pictures
- Distributed by: Republic Pictures
- Release date: May 12, 1955
- Running time: 90 minutes
- Country: United States
- Language: English

Santa Fe Passage is a 1955 American Western film directed by William Witney and starring John Payne, Faith Domergue and Rod Cameron.

== Plot ==
Kirby Randolph is a veteran scout who comes to hate all Indians after being betrayed by a Kiowa chief called Satank, whose massacre killed many men and ruined Kirby's reputation. Kirby and his partner Sam Beekman are offered work by Jess Griswold, who believes a man deserves a second chance. Kirby immediately demands that an old Indian woman, Ptewaquin, be ordered off the wagon train, but her young companion Aurelie St. Clair refuses to part ways with her.

Aurelie has a half-interest in a shipment of ammunition being delivered to Mexican soldiers. The antagonism between her and Kirby changes to a mutual attraction after Kirby heroically saves several lives along the trail.

Jess, who also loves Aurelie, picks a fight with Kirby by disclosing that the girl is a "half-breed." The two men's differences are forgotten during an attack by Satank's men. A broken leg slows Jess, who volunteers to remain behind and keep fighting while the others escape.

Kirby ends up face-to-face with Satank, who is about to kill him when the old woman, Ptewaquin, saves him by killing the Indian chief at the cost of her own life. Kirby discovers that the woman was Aurelie's mother. His hatred gone, he and Aurelie plan to be married in the manner of her mother's people.

== Cast ==
- John Payne as Kirby Randolph
- Faith Domergue as Aurelie St. Clair
- Rod Cameron as Jess Griswold
- Slim Pickens as Sam Beekman
- Irene Tedrow as Ptewaquin
- George Keymas as Chief Satank
- Leo Gordon as Tuss McLawery
- Anthony Caruso as Chavez

== Production ==
Parts of the film were shot in Snow Canyon State Park.

== See also ==
- List of American films of 1955
