= Soho Incident =

1956 British film by Vernon Sewell

- Theatrical release poster
- Directed by: Vernon Sewell
- Screenplay by: Ian Stuart Black
- Based on: Robert Westerby (based on the novel) ("Wide Boys Never Work")
- Produced by: M. J. Frankovich; George Maynard
- Starring: Faith Domergue; Lee Patterson
- Cinematography: Basil Emmott
- Edited by: Peter Rolfe Johnson
- Music by: Robert Sharples
- Production company: Frankovich Productions
- Distributed by: Columbia Pictures
- Release dates: March 1956 (United Kingdom); October 1956 (United States)
- Running time: 77 minutes
- Country: United Kingdom
- Language: English

Soho Incident, released in the United States as Spin a Dark Web, is a 1956 British film noir directed by Vernon Sewell and starring Faith Domergue and Lee Patterson. The screenplay by Ian Stuart Black is based on the 1937 novel Wide Boys Never Work by Robert Westerby.

== Plot ==
Jim Bankley a Canadian veteran living in London, is trying without much luck to succeed as a prizefighter. Through an old army buddy, he meets and begins working for the local Sicilian mob leader Rico Francesi. Bankley falls in love with Rico's sister, the vile Bella Francesi; she soon draws him deeper into the gang's activities. When he finds himself pulled into a murder plot, he finally realizes that his lover is only using him and determines to escape the gang – but things are extremely complicated.

== Cast ==
- Faith Domergue as Bella Francesi
- Lee Patterson as Jim Bankley
- Rona Anderson as Betty Walker
- Martin Benson as Rico Francesi
- Robert Arden as Buddy
- Joss Ambler as Tom Walker
- Peter Hammond as Bill Walker
- Peter Burton as Inspector Collis
- Sam Kydd as Sam
- Russell Westwood as Mick
- Patricia Ryan as Audrey
- Bernard Fox as McLeod

== Critical reception ==
The Monthly Film Bulletin wrote: "A competent and fast-moving gang film, with some excellent location glimpses of Soho by night and day."

In British Sound Films: The Studio Years 1928–1959 David Quinlan rated the film as "average", writing: "Standard thriller of fair pace and good backgrounds."
