= Vadim Andreyev =

Russian actor

- Вадим Андреев
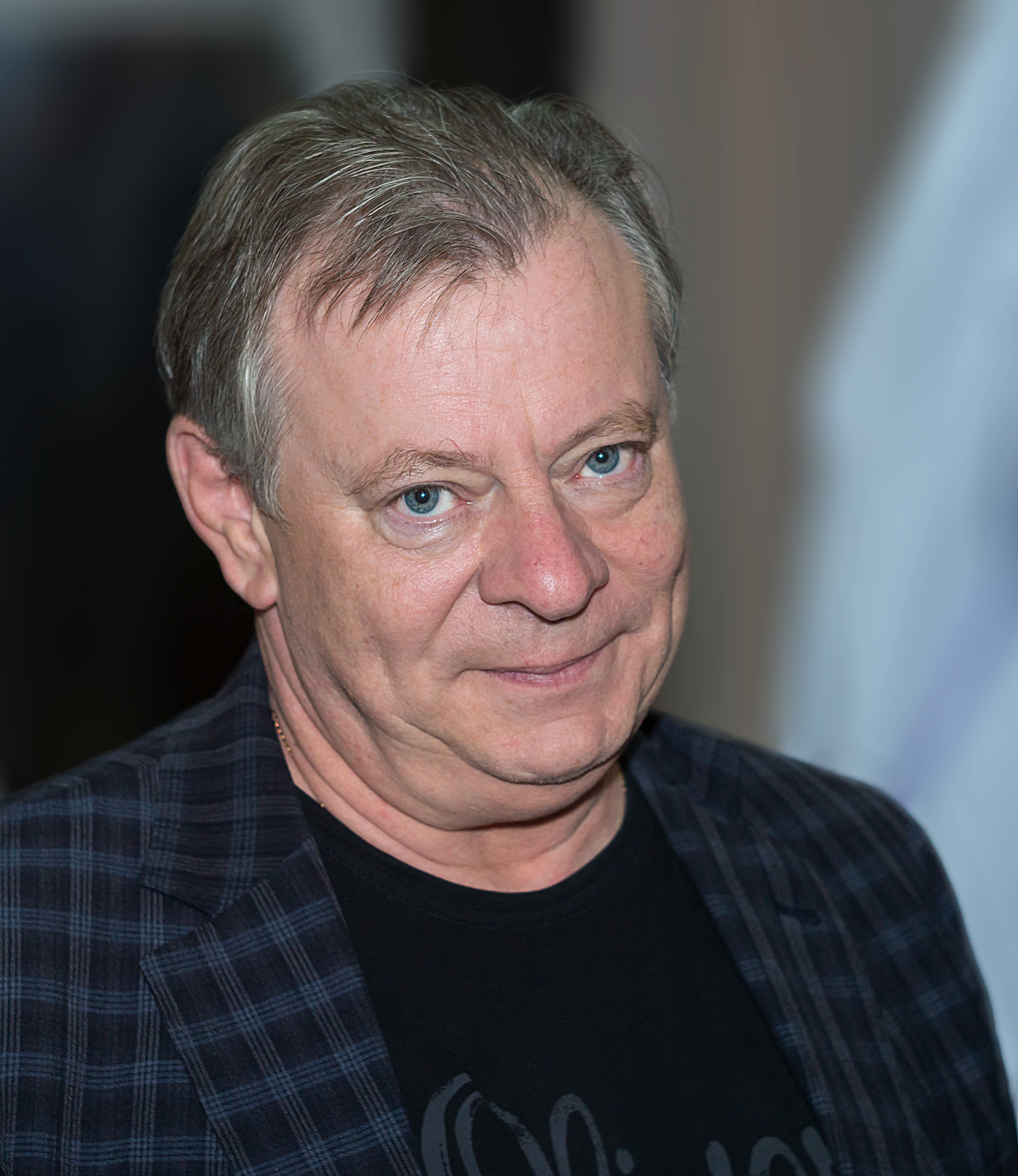
- Born: Vadim Yurievich Andreyev; 30 March 1958 (age 68); Moscow, Russian SFSR, Soviet Union
- Occupation: Actor
- Years active: 1978–present

Vadim Yurievich Andreyev (Russian: Вади́м Ю́рьевич Андре́ев; born 30 March 1958) is a Soviet and Russian theater actor.

== Biography ==
Vadim Andreyev was born in Moscow. Since 1975 he worked as fitter in the Moscow Puppet Theater, and later became an actor. After graduating in 1979 from VGIK, Vadim Andreyev worked on Gorky Film Studio. In 1979-1981, he served in the army.

His film career began with major roles in auteur Vladimir Rogovoy's films Balamut in 1978 and The Sailors Are No Questions in 1980.

Until 2011, Vadim Andreyev took an active part in dubbing foreign animated films. Prior to 2007, he also voiced commercials.

He is married and raised a son named Andrey. In 2013, the granddaughter Sophia was born.

== Selected filmography ==
- 1978 — Balamut as Pyotr Antonovich Gorokhov
- 1980 — Karl Marx. Youth as archivist
- 1980 — Sailors Have No Questions as Sanya Fokin
- 1981 — Carnival as Vadim Arturovich, director of amateur theater
- 1981 — The Driver for a Voyage as Sanya
- 1982 — White Shaman as Zhuravlev
- 1982 — Married Bachelor as Sergey Antipov
- 1984 — TASS Is Authorized to Declare... as Dronov, KGB lieutenant
- 1985 — The Battalions are Asked to Fire as Derevianko
- 1992 — Black Square as Arthur Krasnikovsky
- 1993 — Stalin's Testament as militia's colonel
- 2004 — Children of the Arbat as Baulin
- 2005 — Carmelita as Fors
- 2012/2014 — Moscow. Three Station as Grigory Somov
- 2013 — Molodezhka as Fyodor Mikhailovich
- 2015 — Must Alpinist as militia's chief
- 2019 — Saving Leningrad as Skvortsov
- 2020 — White Snow as Pyotr
- 2021 — Champion of the World as football commentator
- 2024 — Komandir as aunt Kolya
- 2024 — Onegin as Pustyakov
