= Yuri Sarantsev =

Soviet and Russian actor (1928–2005)

- Born: Yuri Dmitriyevich Sarantsev; 7 October 1928; Bolshoy Melik, Balashovsky District, RSFSR, Soviet Union
- Died: 24 August 2005 (aged 76); Moscow, Russia
- Occupations: Actor, voice actor
- Years active: 1950–2005

Yuri Dmitriyevich Sarantsev (Russian: Ю́рий Дми́триевич Сара́нцев; 7 October 1928 – 24 August 2005) was a Soviet and Russian actor who appeared in numerous films between 1950 and 1999. He is most known for the 1962 sci-fi film Planeta Bur. He was also an accomplished voice actor, most famous for providing the voice for Ostap Bender in The Twelve Chairs (1971). People's Artist of Russia (2000).

== Filmography ==
- The Village Doctor (1951) – cook (uncredited)
- True Friends (1954) – Seryozha
- Road to Life (1955) – Grisha Burun
- Good Morning (1955) – Vasya Plotnikov
- Different Fortunes (1956) – Galkin
- A Snow Fairy Tale (1959) – chauffeur's voice (played by Mikhail Pugovkin)
- Thrice Resurrected (1960) – Anton's voice (played by Gennady Pavlov)
- Planeta Bur (1962) – Ivan Shcherba
- Come Tomorrow, Please... (1963) – Kostya's voice (played by Yuri Gorobets)
- The Hyperboloid of Engineer Garin (1965) – Tarashkin
- Voyage to the Prehistoric Planet (1965) – Allen Sherman (uncredited; in original movie as Shcherba)
- Thirty Three (1965) – toothless taxi driver
- Little Fugitive (1966) – captain's assistant
- Give a Paw, Friend! (1967) – foreman of animal control service
- The Shield and the Sword (1968) – Gustav's voice (played by Ernst-Georg Schwill)
- Crime and Punishment (1969) – lieutenant Ilya Petrovich "Gunpowder"
- The Twelve Chairs (1971) – Ostap Bender's voice (played by Archil Gomiashvili)
- Train Stop – Two Minutes (1972) – Vlas Petrovich
- Only "Old Men" Are Going Into Battle (1973) – Vasily Vasilyevich
- Talents and Admirers (1973) – Gavrilo Petrovich Migaev
- You to Me, Me to You (1976) – Sergei Kashkin's voice (played by Leonid Kuravlyov)
- The Throw, or Everything Started on Saturday (1976) – Temirbek Sarsenbaev's voice (played by Yesbolgan Zhaisanbaev)
- Armed and Dangerous (1977) – Starbottle's voice (played by Algimantas Masiulis)
- Balamut (1978) – Aleksei Ivanovich
- Aquanauts (1979) – Selivanov
- Borrowing Matchsticks (1980) – Ville Huttunen's voice (played by Olavi Ahonen)
- Sailors Have No Questions (1980) – Alya's father
- Could One Imagine? (1981) – taxi driver's voice (played by Vladimir Prikhodko)
- Demidovs (1983) – voivode
- A Cruel Romance (1984) – Mikhin
- Sohni Mahiwal (1984) – warrior's voice in Soviet dub (played by Frunzik Mkrtchyan)
- One Second for a Feat (1985) – Romanenko
- Love with Privileges (1989) – Dr. Nikolai Yevgenyevich Kondakov
- The Return of the Battleship (1996) – janitor
- Red Square (2004) – Konstantin Chernenko

== Awards and honors ==
- Order of the Badge of Honour (1976)
- Honored Artist of the RSFSR (1981)
- Medal "Veteran of Labour" (1984)
- Medal "In Commemoration of the 850th Anniversary of Moscow" (1997)
- People's Artist of Russia (2000)
