= The Man with Icy Eyes =

- Directed by: Alberto De Martino
- Written by: Adriano Bolzoni; Massimo De Rita; Arduino Maiuri; Vincenzo Mannino
- Produced by: Felice Testa Gay
- Cinematography: Gábor Pogány
- Edited by: Alberto Gallitti
- Music by: Peppino De Luca
- Release date: 1971
- Running time: 95 minutes
- Country: Italy
- Languages: Italian; English

L'uomo dagli occhi di ghiaccio (internationally released as The Man with Icy Eyes) is a 1971 Italian giallo film directed by Alberto De Martino. It starred Barbara Bouchet, Antonio Sabato, Keenan Wynn, Faith Domergue and Victor Buono. It was shot in Albuquerque, New Mexico. The film was referred to as "an unusual mixture of action-thriller and giallo in Argento's style".

== Plot ==
A state senator is murdered outside his home, and the police arrest a strange man with "icy eyes" as the killer. An Italian reporter finds a stripper who claims that she actually witnessed the man commit the crime. But the reporter later finds holes in her story, and eventually comes to believe that the police have the wrong man.

== Cast ==
- Antonio Sabàto as Eddie Mills
- Barbara Bouchet as Anne Saxe
- Faith Domergue as Mrs. Valdes
- Victor Buono as John Hammond
- Keenan Wynn as Harry Davis
- Corrado Gaipa as Isaac Thetman
- Nello Pazzafini as Man In Elevator
