= Faith Domergue =

American actress (1924/25–1999)

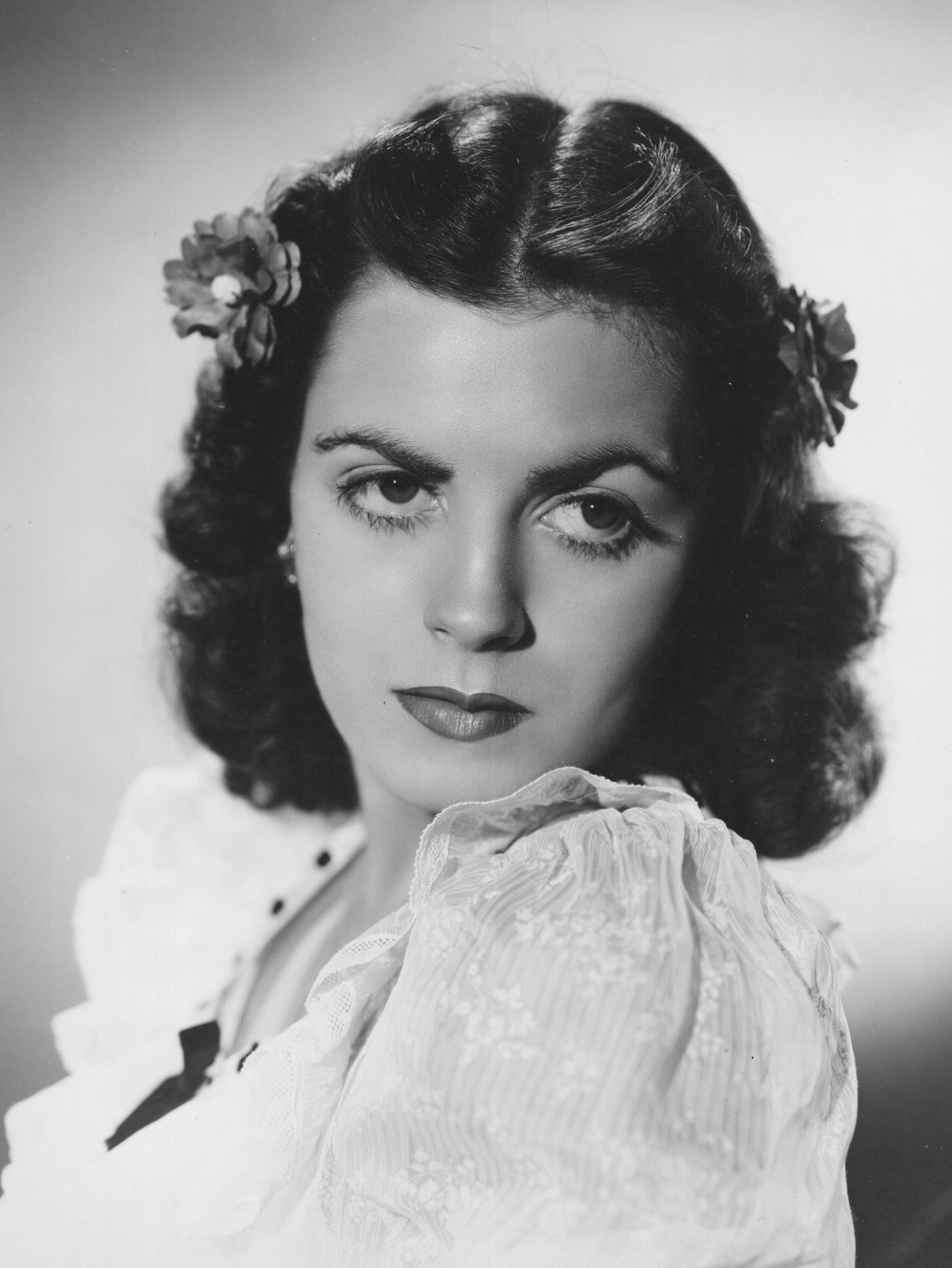
- Domergue c. 1950
- Born: June 16, 1924 or 1925 (Note: Sources of Domergue's birth year vary; those that list 1924 include: "Obituaries: Faith Domergue; Film Star Contracted by Howard Hughes". Los Angeles Times. April 17, 1999.; Raw, Laurence (2012). Character Actors in Horror and Science Fiction Films, 1930-1960. McFarland & Company. p. 70. ISBN 978-0-786-44474-8.; Sources that list 1925 include: "Faith Domergue". British Film Institute. Archived from the original on August 19, 2016.; Vallance, Tom (May 11, 1999). "Obituary: Faith Domergue". The Independent.; Willis, John A.; Blum, Daniel C. (1990). Screen World. Vol. 41. Crown Publishers. p. 225. ISBN 978-0-517-57841-4.); New Orleans, Louisiana, U.S.
- Died: April 4, 1999 (age 73–74); Santa Barbara, California, U.S.
- Occupation: Actress
- Years active: 1941–1974
- Spouses: Teddy Stauffer (m. 1946; div. 1947) Hugo Fregonese (m. 1947; div. 1958) Paolo Cossa (m. 1966; died 1992)
- Children: 2

Faith Marie Domergue (/doʊˈmɛərɡ/; June 16, 1924, or 1925 – April 4, 1999) was an American film and television actress. Discovered at age 16 by media and aircraft mogul Howard Hughes, she was signed to a contract with Hughes's RKO Radio Pictures and cast as the lead in the studio's thriller Vendetta, which had a troubled four-year production before finally being released in 1950.

Domergue appeared in science fiction and horror pictures, such as Cult of the Cobra, This Island Earth, It Came from Beneath the Sea, and The Atomic Man, all released in 1955, earning her a reputation as an early "scream queen". Domergue's later career consisted of B movies, television guest roles, and European productions.

== Early life ==
Domergue was born in New Orleans, Louisiana, on June 16, 1924 or 1925 (sources differ). She was adopted by Adabelle Quimet when six weeks old. When Faith was 18 months old, Adabelle married Leo Domergue.

The family moved to California in 1928, where Domergue attended Beverly Hills Catholic School and St. Monica's Convent School. While a sophomore at University High School, she signed a contract with Warner Bros., and made her first on-screen appearance with an uncredited walk-on role in Blues in the Night (1941). The same year, she appeared on the cover of Photoplay as Faith Dorn; the name change, she later claimed, was "because Jack Warner was too stupid to pronounce Domergue".

== Career ==
=== 1943–1950: Early work; Howard Hughes ===
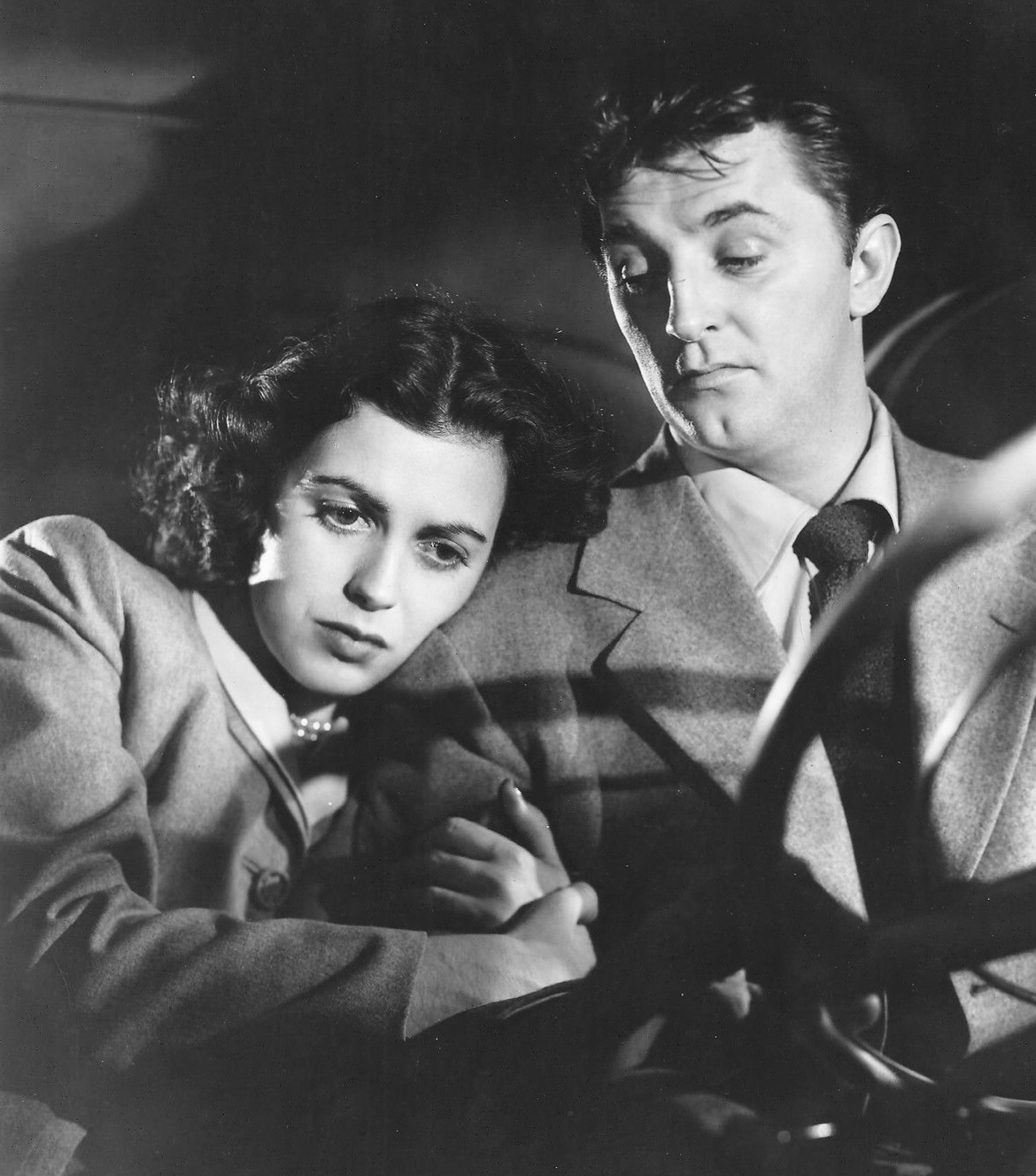
Domergue and Robert Mitchum in Where Danger Lives (1950).

After graduating in 1942, Domergue continued to pursue a career in acting, but after sustaining injuries in a near-fatal car accident, her plans were put on hold. While recuperating from the accident, she attended a party aboard Howard Hughes' yacht. Enamored with her, Hughes bought out her contract with Warner Bros., signed her to a three-picture deal with RKO, and cast her in the thriller Vendetta (1950). The film had a long and troubled production history, with reshoots and several changes of director, further exacerbated by Hughes's health problems following a near-fatal plane crash he endured in July 1946. The production extended over four years and cost $3.5 million.

By the time of Vendetta's premiere in 1950, Domergue had left Los Angeles for Palm Springs, and was pregnant with her second child. After the film's release, Domergue separated from Hughes, disappointed with the way the film and her career had been handled: "I was told he spent five million dollars publicizing me", she said, "but [the] film was[n’t properly] released. It was all wasted." The critical reception was also dismissive. The New York Times panned the film as "a garrulous, slow, and obvious period piece, weighed down by a profusion of exotic accents, undistinguished dialogue, and unconvincing play acting... set against a background of the wild, Corsican countryside, which does give the picture an atmosphere of suspenseful authenticity". The review damned Domergue's performance with faint praise: "Faith Domergue, the heralded newcomer, is less than a fiery heroine. But despite the flamboyant lines that are her lot, the attractive Miss Domergue does occasionally contribute genuine emotional acting to the proceedings."

Following Vendetta, Domergue freelanced in the film noir Where Danger Lives (1950), playing a femme fatale opposite Robert Mitchum and Claude Rains. Bosley Crowther, in The New York Times, criticized Domergue's performance for "manifest[ing] nothing more than a comparatively sultry appearance and an ability to recite simple lines".

=== 1951–1959: Universal and science-fiction films ===
After having lived briefly in England with her husband, Domergue returned to the United States in 1953, when she signed a contract with Universal Pictures. Her final credit for RKO was the drama This Is My Love (1954), which was shot after the release of her first film with Universal, The Duel at Silver Creek (1952), in which she appeared opposite Audie Murphy.

In 1955, Domergue appeared in another Western, Santa Fe Passage, playing an ammunition retailer opposite John Payne and George Keymas. Domergue then appeared in a series of science-fiction, monster, and horror films. The first of these was Cult of the Cobra (Universal Pictures 1955), in which six American Air Force officers discover a cult of snake worshippers. This was followed with a role in Columbia Pictures's It Came from Beneath the Sea (1955), a science-fiction, monster film that was a major commercial success, grossing $1.7 million at the box office. The following year, Domergue starred in This Island Earth (also 1955), Universal's first color science-fiction film. The film received moderate critical praise for its performances, writing, and inventive special effects. Domergue's tenure in these pictures earned her a reputation as an early scream queen.

Domergue appeared in a string of European productions: the British science-fiction film The Atomic Man (1955), directed by Ken Hughes; British noir films Soho Incident (1956) and Man in the Shadow (1957), released in the United States as Violent Stranger; and the Italian production, The Sky Burns (1958).

=== 1960–1974: Late career and retirement ===
In the late 1950s and 1960s, she made many appearances on television series, including Sugarfoot, two episodes of Hawaiian Eye, two episodes of Have Gun – Will Travel, two episodes of Bonanza, The Rifleman, and two episodes of Perry Mason. In her first Perry Mason episode, "The Case of the Guilty Clients" (1961), she played murderer Conception O'Higgins, and in "The Case of the Greek Goddess" (1963), she played murder victim Cleo Grammas.

By the late 1960s, Domergue was appearing mainly in low-budget "B" horror movies and European productions. Domergue's last foray in science fiction was Voyage to the Prehistoric Planet (1965), an American version of a Russian film, mainly backed by Russian producers and populated with Russian actors. She began traveling to Italy in 1952, living in Rome for extended periods. She relocated to Europe permanently in 1968, moving from Rome to Geneva, Switzerland, and Marbella, Spain, until the death of her Italian husband, Paolo, in 1991. In the late 1960s, she appeared in several Italian giallo films, including Lucio Fulci's One on Top of the Other (1969), and Alberto De Martino's The Man with Icy Eyes (1971). Her final film credit was for The House of Seven Corpses (1974), an independent horror film shot in Salt Lake City.

== Personal life ==
In 1942, Domergue began an intermittent relationship with Howard Hughes. After she discovered that Hughes was also seeing Ava Gardner, Rita Hayworth, and Lana Turner, the couple broke up in 1943.

On January 28, 1946, Domergue married bandleader Teddy Stauffer at the San Diego Superior Courthouse. On October 8, 1947, hours after divorcing Stauffer in Ciudad Juárez, she married director Hugo Fregonese there. The couple separated twice before Domergue was granted an uncontested divorce on June 24, 1958. Domergue and Fregonese had two children: Their first child, Diana Maria, was born on January 1, 1949, in Buenos Aires, and their second child, John Anthony, was born on August 22, 1951, in Los Angeles. John, who later became an urban planner, died on his mother's birthday in 2018 at his Portland, Oregon home.

In 1966, she married director Paolo Cossa, with whom she remained until his death in 1992. Despite the divorces, Domergue remained a practicing Roman Catholic.

== Death ==
Domergue spent her later years in retirement in Palo Alto, California. She died on April 4, 1999, in Santa Barbara of cancer.

== In popular culture ==
In the 2004 Howard Hughes biopic film The Aviator, Domergue was played by Kelli Garner.

== Filmography ==
=== Film ===
Year	Title	Role	Notes	Ref.
1941	Dancing in a Harem	Dancer	Short film; credited as Faith Dorn	
1941	Blues in the Night	Jitterbug	Uncredited	
1946	Young Widow	Gerry Taylor	Alternative title: The Naughty Widow	
1949	Hardly a Criminal	Woman in casino	Uncredited; Alternative title: Apenas un delincuente	
1950	Where Danger Lives	Margo Lannington		
1950	Vendetta	Colomba della Rabia		
1952	The Duel at Silver Creek	Opal Lacy	Alternative title: Claim Jumpers	
1953	The Great Sioux Uprising	Joan Britton		
1954	This Is My Love	Evelyn Myer		
1955	Santa Fe Passage	Aurelie St. Clair		
1955	Cult of the Cobra	Lisa Moya		
1955	It Came from Beneath the Sea	Professor Lesley Joyce	Alternative title: Monster from Beneath the Sea	
1955	This Island Earth	Dr. Ruth Adams		
1955	Timeslip	Jill Rabowski	Alternative title: The Atomic Man	
1956	Soho Incident	Bella Francesi	Alternative title: Spin a Dark Web	
1957	Man in the Shadow	Barbara Peters	Alternative title: Violent Stranger	
1958	The Sky Burns	Anna	Alternative title: Il Cielo brucia	
1959	Escort West	Martha Drury		
1963	California	Carlotta Torres		
1965	Voyage to the Prehistoric Planet	Dr. Marsha Evans	Additional material only, dubbed version of the Soviet film Planeta Bur (1962)	
1967	Track of Thunder	Mrs. Goodwin		
1969	One on Top of the Other	Martha	Alternative titles: Una sull'altra, Perversion Story	
1969	Besieged	Lorenzo's mother	Alternative title: L'amore breve	
1970	The Gamblers	Signora Del Isolla		
1971	Blood Legacy	Veronica Dean	Alternative title: Legacy of Blood	
1971	The Man with Icy Eyes	Mrs. Valdes	Alternative title: L'Uomo dagli occhi di ghiaccio	
1974	So Evil, My Sister	Millie	Alternative titles: Psycho Sisters; The Siblings	
1974	The House of Seven Corpses	Gayle Dorian		

=== Television ===
Year(s)	Title	Role	Notes
1953	The Revlon Mirror Theater	Laurie Rogers	1 episode
1953–1954	Lux Video Theatre		2 episodes
1954	Fireside Theatre	Mariana; Jenny	2 episodes
1954	Ford Theatre		1 episode
1954–1958	Schlitz Playhouse of Stars	Marcella; Mrs. Vialez	2 episodes
1955	Celebrity Playhouse		1 episode
1956	The Count of Monte Cristo	Renee Morrell	1 episode
1957	Overseas Press Club – Exclusive!	Helen Zotos	1 episode
1959	Sugarfoot	Isabel Starkey	1 episode
1959	State Trooper	Elaine Kendall; Janice Kendall	2 episodes
1959	Bourbon Street Beat	Susan Wood	1 episode
1959	Cheyenne	Maria	1 episode
1959–1961	Hawaiian Eye	Onori; Rosa Martell	2 episodes
1960	Colt .45	Suzanne Tremaine	1 episode
1960	Bronco	Catalina	1 episode
1960	Michael Shayne	Kara	1 episode
1961	77 Sunset Strip	Gretchen Jervis	1 episode
1961	The Tall Man	Kate Elder	1 episode
1961	Lock-Up	Marianne	1 episode
1961–1963	Perry Mason	Conception O'Higgins; Cleo Grammas	2 episodes
1961–1964	Bonanza	Lee Bolden; Carla Ybarra	2 episodes
1962–1963	Have Gun – Will Travel	Ria; Elena Ybarra	2 episodes
1966	Combat!	Madame Fouchet	1 episode
1968	Garrison's Gorillas	Carla	1 episode

== Sources ==
- Carter, Steven (2003). I Was Howard Hughes. London, England: Bloomsbury. ISBN 978-1-582-34375-4.
- Charyn, Jerome (1996). Movieland: Hollywood and the Great American Dream Culture. New York City, New York: New York University Press. ISBN 978-0-814-71550-5.
- Parla, Paul; Mitchell, Charles P. (2000). Screen Sirens Scream!: Interviews with 20 Actresses from Science Fiction, Horror, Film Noir, and Mystery Movies, 1930s to 1960s. Jefferson, North Caroolina: McFarland & Company. ISBN 0-7864-0701-8.
- Weaver, Tom (2010). I Was a Monster Movie Maker: Conversations with 22 SF and Horror Filmmakers. Jefferson, North Carolina: McFarland & Company. ISBN 978-0-786-46444-9.
