= Man in the Shadow (1957 British film) =

1957 British film by Montgomery Tully

- Australian theatrical release poster
- Directed by: Montgomery Tully
- Written by: Maisie Sharman
- Produced by: Alec C. Snowden; Richard Gordon
- Starring: Zachary Scott; Faith Domergue
- Cinematography: Phil Grindrod
- Edited by: Geoffrey Muller
- Music by: Trevor Duncan
- Production company: Merton Park Studios
- Distributed by: Anglo-Amalgamated
- Release date: September 1957
- Running time: 83 minutes
- Country: United Kingdom
- Language: English

Man in the Shadow (U.S. title Violent Stranger) is a 1957 British second feature ('B') crime film directed by Montgomery Tully and starring Zachary Scott and Faith Domergue. It was written by Maisie Sharman.

The film was retitled for the US market because of the release of the American film of the same name in the same year.

== Plot ==
Antiques shop owner Alan Peters is convicted of the murder of his client Dick Lennox. In Italy, hospital worker Carlo Raffone overhears a delirious patient, John Sullivan, confess to a murder. Raffone steals effects from Sullivan including a statuette. He travels to England and visits Peters' wife Barbara, offering to sell her the evidence which would exonerate her husband. Meanwhile Sullivan recovers and also goes to England, and shoots Raffone in order to recover the statuette. However Sullivan later dies of a heart failure. The statuette, which turns out to be the murder weapon, is found in his suitcase and Peters is released from custody.

== Cast ==
- Zachary Scott as John Lewis Sullivan
- Faith Domergue as Barbara Peters
- Peter Illing as Carlo Raffone
- Faith Brook as Joan Lennox
- John Welsh as Inspector Hunt
- Julian Strange as Detective Sergeant
- Gordon Jackson as Jimmy Norris
- Kay Callard as Pamela Norris
- Harold Siddons as Colin Wells
- John Horsley as Alan Peters
- Fabia Drake as Sister Veronica

== Critical reception ==
Kine Weekly wrote: "A workmanlike job, effectively varnished, it will intrigue and thrill the ninepennies. ... The picture feels its way a trifle gingerly at first, but once its plot assumes definite shape it steadily grips."

Picturegoer wrote: "The film's not badly acted, but it is the choice of Italian exteriors, rather than the cast, that makes the hectic tale at all palatable."

The Daily Film Renter wrote: "The story takes a little time to settle down, but, once it has established its mood and got into its stride, it moves fast, sticks to the point and holds the attention."

In British Sound Films: The Studio Years 1928–1959 David Quinlan rated the film as "mediocre", writing: "Disappointing vehicle for visiting stars."
