= Balamut =

1978 film

- Movie poster. Artist Anatoly Gorenkov
- Russian: Баламут
- Directed by: Vladimir Rogovoy
- Written by: Sergei Bodrov; Mikhail Nozhkin
- Produced by: David Prober
- Starring: Vadim Andreyev; Natalya Kaznacheeva; Yevgeniya Simonova; Vladimir Shikhov; Valentina Klyagina
- Cinematography: Vyacheslav Yegorov
- Edited by: Tamara Belyayeva
- Music by: David Ashkenazi
- Production company: Gorky Film Studio
- Release date: 1978
- Running time: 85 min.
- Country: Soviet Union
- Language: Russian

Balamut (Russian: Баламут) is a 1978 Soviet comedy-drama film directed by Vladimir Rogovoy.

According to the results of a poll conducted by the magazine Soviet Screen, the lead actor Vadim Andreyev was included in the top ten actors of 1979.

The film tells about the growing up of young people, one of which is the determined and passionate Pyotr Gorokhov, who is called Balamut.

== Plot ==
The film follows the journey of Pyotr Gorokhov, a rural high school graduate from the village of Dyadkovo, who arrives in Moscow to apply to a prestigious economics university. By sheer luck, he passes his English exam, aided by a young instructor, Valentina Nikolayevna Romashova, who had once been assigned to work in his village. Despite scoring below the entry threshold, Gorokhov is admitted on the rector’s decision, who also has rural roots. Meanwhile, Anya, a girl from Saratov, is also admitted after encountering a local Moscow boy, Sanya Alyokhin, at the train station. Though Sanya quickly falls for Anya and decides to pursue economics rather than music to be with her, Anya sees him only as a friend.

As the semester progresses, Gorokhov stands out among his mostly urban classmates with his provincial manners and strong moral principles, earning the nickname "Balamut." Despite excelling in his studies, especially in mathematics and economics, he struggles with English, even with Valentina's support. He also develops an unspoken love for a Cuban exchange student, though he never finds the courage to talk to her. Anya, on the other hand, falls for a young professor, Dmitry Alekseevich, and they soon decide to marry, leaving Sanya disappointed. When Valentina goes on maternity leave, Gorokhov’s new English instructor, Beatrice Bernardovna Sinyakina—nicknamed "BBC"—takes a stricter approach, denying him leniency despite his achievements. In frustration, Gorokhov lashes out, questioning her commitment to education, prompting her to reluctantly pass him.

Feeling defeated, Gorokhov briefly leaves the university, intending to join the Pacific Fleet, but his classmates convince him to return. As the second semester unfolds, Sanya leaves to join the army, Anya thrives in her marriage and expects a child, and Gorokhov improves in all subjects except English. On the day of his final English exam, he encounters his crush, Noris, in an elevator and, to his surprise, manages to converse in English. His instructor, BBC, overhears and rewards him with a perfect grade. Yet, as the film closes, Noris reveals she is leaving Moscow that evening, leaving Gorokhov alone and reflective on the school’s sports field, where he first saw her.

== Cast ==
- Vadim Andreyev as Pyotr Gorokhov
- Natalya Kaznacheeva as Anya
- Nikolay Denisov as Sanya
- Vladimir Shikhov as Ogorodnikov
- Valentina Klyagina as Katya
- Otkam Iskenderov as Maksud
- Viktor Shulgin as Panteley Fedorovich
- Noris Polastre as Noris
- Yevgeny Karelskikh as Serebryakov
- Larisa Blinova as Sinyakina
- Yevgeniya Simonova as Valentina Nikolaevna Romashova
- Yuri Sarantsev as dean Alexey Ivanovich
- Vadim Zakharchenko as Kireev
- Roman Filippov a Fyodor Paramonov
- Yuri Chernov as Zubkov
