= The Throw, or Everything Started on Saturday =

- Written by: Aleksandr Strakhov; Felix Franzusov
- Directed by: Serik Raibayev
- Starring: Yesbolgan Zhaisanbaev; Asanali Ashimov; Galina Shetenova
- Music by: Aleksandr Zatsepin
- Country of origin: Soviet Union
- Original language: Russian

Production
- Cinematography: Mikhail Aranyshev
- Running time: 64 minutes
- Production company: Kazakhfilm

Original release
- Release: 1976

The Throw, or Everything Started on Saturday (Russian: Бросок, или Всё началось в субботу, romanized: Brosok, ili Vsyo nachanalos v subbotu) is a 1976 Soviet science fiction film directed by Serik Raibayev based on the story by Kir Bulychev The Ability to Throw Ball [Умение кидать мяч].

== Plot ==
Architect Temirbek Sarsenbaev receives from a mysterious professor the gift of accurately throwing objects at a target, from a long distance and almost without aiming. The coach of the local basketball club "Arman" finds out about this, and invites him to try his hand at the game. Although Temirbek has no natural propensity for basketball, except for the ability to accurately throw the ball, his gift transforms the team, which begins to rely on Sarsenbaev.

The team, led by the new leader, is winning a series of high-profile victories, and Temirbek himself becomes a real star of basketball. He has fans and female admirers, which he could not even dream about earlier. But success and fame do not bring happiness to Sarsenbaev, he realizes that he could not become a real basketball player.

On the eve of the decisive match, he declares about leaving the club. "Arman" begins to lose without his leader, Temirbek still comes to the game to help the team. Going to the site and having achieved a break in the game, he asks the coach to replace him with a young player, who was always the backup. "Arman" wins, and Sarsenbaev finally leaves the sport after the match.

== Cast ==
- Yesbolgan Zhaisanbaev — Temirbek Sarsenbaev (voiced by Yuri Sarantsev)
- Asanali Ashimov — Professor
- Galina Shetenova — Estula
- Lev Tymkin — Andrei Zakharovich, the coach
- Jeksen Kairliev — Bakhyt Baymutdin, basketball player
- Dzhambul Khudaibergenov — basketball player
- Dimash Akhimov — basketball player
- N. Yesengaliev — basketball player
- B. Seitov — basketball player
- Baikenge Belbaev — basketball player
- Vitaly Grishko — basketball player
- Anaurbek Moldabekov — commentator
- Gulnara Rakhimbaeva — assistant director
- Gulziya Belbaeva — episode
- Rimma Kabdaliyeva — Aigirim
- Tanat Zhailibekov — administrator
