= Azimov =

Azimov (Russian: Ази́мов; masculine) or Azimova (Ази́мова; feminine) is a Russian last name. Variants of this last name include Ozimkov/Ozimkova (Озимко́в/Озимко́ва) and Ozimov/Ozimova (Ози́мов/Ози́мова).

There are several theories about the origins of this last name. According to one, it is derived from the non-Christian names (or nicknames) Ozimko (Озимко), Ozim (Озим), and Ozimy (Озимый), which in dialects with akanye transformed into "Azim" (Азим). These names/nicknames were given to babies born in late fall right before the beginning of winter. It is also possible that this last name derives from the Pskov and Tver dialectal word "озим" (ozim), meaning trembling, shivering, a chilly sensation in the body. Another possible origin is the Greek word for a bland cake consumed in religious contexts (most likely meaning that this last name was created artificially in a seminary environment). In his autobiography, Isaac Asimov states that his surname (a variant spelling of Azimov) comes from the first part of ozimyi khleb (озимый хлеб), meaning the winter grain (specifically rye) in which his great-great-great-grandfather dealt, with the Russian patronymic ending -ov added. Finally, the last name "Azimov" may be of Turkic origins, deriving from the Arabic name "Azim", which literally means great.

Notable people with the last name include:

- Anvar Azimov (born 1950), Uzbek-born Russian politician and diplomat
- Araz Azimov (born 1963), Azerbaijani politician
- Aziza Azimova (1915–1997), Tajikistani ballet dancer and actress
- Isaak Azimov, birth name of Isaac Asimov (1920–1992), American writer and professor
- Rakhim Azimov (born 1964), Russian politician
- Rustam Azimov (born 1958), Uzbek politician
- Yahyo Azimov (born 1947), Tajik politician

== See also ==
- Asimov (surname), a related last name
- Asimov (disambiguation)
