= The House of Seven Corpses =

- 1974 theatrical release poster
- Directed by: Paul Harrison
- Written by: Paul Harrison; Thomas J. Kelly
- Produced by: Paul Lewis; Paul Harrison
- Starring: John Ireland; Faith Domergue; John Carradine
- Cinematography: Don Jones
- Edited by: Peter Parasheles
- Music by: Bob Emenegger
- Production company: Television Corporation of America
- Distributed by: International Amusement Corp
- Release date: December 12, 1973 (Charlotte, North Carolina)
- Running time: 90 minutes
- Country: United States
- Language: English
- Budget: $250,000

The House of Seven Corpses is a 1973 (Note: Sources vary about the release year classification of the film, with some stating 1973, and others 1974. However, the film was first released theatrically in December 1973. Furthermore, its copyright in the end credits bears 1973.) American supernatural horror film directed by Paul Harrison and starring John Ireland, Faith Domergue, and John Carradine. Its plot follows a film crew making a horror film about various members of a family who met violent deaths, which they film on location in the historic home where the events took place. After filming a scene in which a character reads from The Book of the Dead, the crew is plagued by supernatural occurrences.

== Plot summary ==
Film director Eric Hartman is making a horror film about the Beal house, a mansion in which numerous members of the family all met violent deaths, ranging from accident to suicide and murder. Eric decides to film the movie in the actual Beal house. In the midst of shooting a scene, aging actress Gayle Dorian, who is playing Maria Beal, reads from The Book of the Dead and chants: “Exsurgent mortui et ad me veniunt” (“may the dead rise and come to me”). Edgar Price, the caretaker of the home, interrupts the filming of the scene by remarking that it is historically inaccurate.

Edgar takes the cast and crew on a tour of the house, showing them the sites of various deaths before bringing them to the rooms they will be staying in on the top floor of the mansion. Anne, another actress in the film, finds several books on the occult in a bedroom. Later that night, Anne witnesses Edgar climbing into a coffin in the graveyard behind the home from her bedroom window, and informs her boyfriend, a crewmember named David, that she is frightened of the house. Meanwhile, Gayle's pet cat, Cleon, escapes her room, leading her downstairs, where her drunken co-star, Christopher, forces himself on her. After Gayle forces Christopher off of her, Eric stumbles on the scene and breaks up the fight. Afterward, Anne and David inform Eric about their witnessing Edgar in the graveyard. Eric tells them he filmed some footage of Edgar in the cemetery for the film, but appears perturbed when they tell him they watched Edgar climb into a coffin.

The next day, while filming a scene outside, Gayle shrieks upon seeing her dead cat lying in the grass. Eric suspects that Edgar killed the cat. When he goes to visit Edgar at his living quarters, he finds a gun in a locked drawer, which he steals. Edgar vehemently denies killing the cat. When Eric leaves, Edgar returns to etching "Cleon" on a headstone. Gayle threatens to quit the film, but Eric persuades her to stay.

On the last day of the shoot, David reads from the Book of the Dead, repeating a chant summoning the dead to come to him; simultaneously, Gayle reads from the book as well during the filming of a scene in which her character, Maria, is resurrecting her lover's dead body. Meanwhile, Edgar hears noises coming from the cemetery, and goes to inspect. He is confronted by a zombie that emerges from a grave, which strangles him. After filming completes, Eric congratulates the cast before they retire to their rooms. Shortly after, the zombie arrives at the house, killing three crew members—Ron, Danny, and Tom—as they tear down equipment. Gayle subsequently witnesses the zombie climbing the staircase, and frantically obtains Edgar's gun from Eric's bedroom. A frightened Gayle inadvertently shoots Christopher to death, mistaking him for the zombie. Anne hears the gunshot, and upon going to investigate, finds Gayle's corpse hanging from a rope; horrified, Anne faints.

Meanwhile, when Eric and David go to film pick-ups in the cemetery, they find Edgar's dead body near an empty grave. David suddenly attacks Eric, but falls into the grave during the tussle. Beneath a thin layer of dirt, Eric spots the grave marking, and upon rubbing it away, finds that it reads "David Beal: 1847–1896." David proceeds to reemerge from the grave as a zombie, causing Eric to flee back to the house, where he finds the bodies of the three dead crew members along with those of Gayle, Christopher, and Anne. Eric grows hysterical when he observes his spools of film destroyed on the floor. Moments later, the zombie throws a film camera from the top stair landing onto Eric's head, killing him. The zombie then carries Anne's corpse back to the cemetery and disappears into the grave with it.

== Cast ==
- John Ireland as Eric Hartman
- Faith Domergue as Gayle Dorian
- John Carradine as Edgar Price
- Carole Wells as Anne
- Charles Macaulay as Christopher Millan
- Jerry Strickler as David
- Ron Foreman as Ron
- Dennis Record as Tommy [credited as Larry Record]
- Charles Bail as Jonathon Anthony Beal/Theodore Beal
- Lucy Doheny as Suzanne Beal
- Jo Anne Mower as Allison Beal
- Ron Garcia as Charles Beal
- Jeff Alexander as Russell Beal
- Wells Bond as The Ghoul
- Laurie Bartram as Debbie (uncredited)

== Production ==
=== Development ===
The House of Seven Corpses was the sole directorial feature film by Paul Harrison, who worked primarily as a television writer.

=== Filming ===
Principal photography took place at the Utah Governor's Mansion in Salt Lake City in the fall of 1972 on a budget of $250,000. The initial shoot lasted approximately eighteen days. The project was completed by February 1973.

== Release ==
The House of Seven Corpses was released theatrically in Charlotte, North Carolina on December 12, 1973. The film's release expanded to Texas in February 1974, and to Baltimore, Maryland in March 1974.

The film was often screened on late-night television in the United States throughout the 1980s.

=== Home media ===
Geneon Video released the film on DVD in 2005. In 2013, Severin Films reissued it on DVD and Blu-ray.

Dark Force Entertainment released the film on 4K UHD Blu-ray on June 25, 2024. Kino Lorber reissued the film on 4K UHD Blu-ray on April 21, 2026.

== Reception ==
=== Box office ===
The film earned $9,807 during its opening week at the Mayfair Theatre in Baltimore, Maryland.

=== Critical response ===
Writing in The Zombie Movie Encyclopedia, academic Peter Dendle called the film "routine but capably handled". Writing in Zombie Movies: The Ultimate Guide, Glenn Kay called the concept better suited to an anthology film. Bloody Disgusting rated it 1.5/5 stars and wrote that though it is "only frightening in the first few minutes". Stuart Galbraith of DVD Talk rated it 2/5 stars and called it "cheap and derivative but hard to entirely dislike". Daryl Loomis of DVD Verdict wrote, "While there are things to enjoy about The House of Seven Corpses, it is completely forgettable, mostly because it's patently unscary."

In a 2013 retrospective for Turner Classic Movies, Nathaniel Thompson describes the film as "a snapshot of a juncture in Hollywood history in which multiple generations of actors and Los Angeles players intersected, producing a film whose curiosity value extends well beyond its status as a horror programmer."

== Sources ==
- Dendle, Peter (2001). The Zombie Movie Encyclopedia. Jefferson, North Carolina: McFarland. ISBN 978-0-7864-9288-6.
- Hutchings, Peter (2009). The A to Z of Horror Cinema. Lanham, Maryland: Scarecrow Press. ISBN 978-0-810-87050-5.
- Kay, Glenn (2008). Zombie Movies: The Ultimate Guide. Chicago, Illinois: Chicago Review Press. ISBN 978-1-55652-770-8.
- Picart, Caroline Joan; Smoot, Frank; Blodgett, Jayne (2001). The Frankenstein Film Sourcebook. Westport, Connecticut: Greenwood Publishing. ISBN 978-0-313-31350-9.
- Weaver, Tom (2010). I Was a Monster Movie Maker: Conversations with 22 SF and Horror Filmmakers. Jefferson, North Carolina: McFarland. ISBN 978-0-786-46265-0.
- Young, R. G. (2000). The Encyclopedia of Fantastic Film: Ali Baba to Zombies. New York City, New York: Applause Books. ISBN 978-1-557-83269-6.
