= Joseph Pustylnik =

Soviet composer (1905–1991)

Jóseph Pustýlnik (1905 in Balta – 1991 in Moscow) was a Soviet composer, violinist, teacher, music theorist, active associate of Johann Admoni on organization of the Seminar of Amateur composers at the composers' House in Leningrad.

== Biography ==
=== Youth and Pedagogical work ===
Joseph Pustylnik was born on January 17, 1905, in Balta, Podolian Governorate (today in Odesa Oblast, Ukraine). In 1924, he entered and in 1929 he graduated from the Odessa Conservatory as a conductor, class of A. Stolyarov. However, he is not found work as a conductor, because in 1925-1926 he was a member violinist Odessa Opera and Ballet Theater. Surviving in one way or another way by musical earnings Joseph Pustylnik decides to improve his musical skills and graduated in 1936 the Leningrad Conservatory on the composition (class of Pyotr Ryazanov).

Since then, Joseph Pustylnik binds entire music fate with Leningrad and the Leningrad Conservatory. First, in 1938, he teaches composition at the Central music College in Leningrad, but in 1939 he was give the place of a teacher and at the Leningrad Conservatory. In connection with the great Patriotic War the fate during excommunicated him from the Leningrad Conservatory. In 1942-1943 he works as a conductor of Kazan management of cinema, and in the period from 1943 to 1944 - the conductor of the Philharmonic hall in Izhevsk.

In 1963 Joseph Pustylnik received the title and the position of associate Professor at the Leningrad Conservatory, and after writing his Doctoral thesis on "Mobile counterpoint and free letter" from 1967 he worked as Professor.

After World War II, in early 1947 Joseph Pustylnik is close friends with Johann Admoni, which together with like-minded people did in those years informal free (folk) music institution at the House of composers in Leningrad - Seminar of Amateur composers. He is a teacher at the Leningrad Conservatory because Joseph Pustylnik were able to give the Seminar status actually a branch of the Leningrad Conservatory, without the right to issue state diplomas to the participants. However, he always contributed to any student in the admission to the Leningrad Conservatory.

In the years of perestroika in connection with the deteriorating health Joseph Pustylnik was forced to leave the favorite Leningrad and the Leningrad Conservatory and move towards her daughter to Moscow, where he died in 1991 at the age of 86.

=== Musical creativity ===
Before World War II Joseph Pustylnik wrote music for films, in particular, he wrote the music for the film "Patriot" (1939) and "Return" (1940). However, it was always drawn to the genre of Opera.

In 1933 he created later became his most popular work is the children's Opera in his own libretto to the poems of Samuil Marshak "Fire", which for many years was sung on the radio and pleasing to the pre-war kids. His symphonic cantata on the motives of poems Musa Jalil performed in the Leningrad Philharmonic in the 1950s repeatedly. The public was not left without the favorable attention his cycle of romances on verses of Musa Jalil.

The main composer achievement of Joseph Pustylnik was the creation the first Chuvash Opera "Narspi" ("Runaway"), which he wrote in 1952 on the poem "Narspi" the K. Ivanov (libretto by I. Maximov-Koshkinskiy and P. Gradov). In March 1955 forces of the choir, orchestra and solicitously state Philharmonic society and the Chuvash state ensemble of song and dance in Cheboksary 3 pictures of the Opera were delivered (musical Director F. Lukin, conductor Century A. Kudashev, directed by I. Maximov-Koshkinskiy, artist P. D. Dmitriev, starring made soprano T. Chumakova). Unfortunately the great success of the Opera did not have, but went down in history of the Chuvash people as the first Opera of the life of simple Chuvashes. In 1958 in Moscow was executed and his Opera "the Seagull".

=== Scientific work ===
In his youth, in the years of study at the Odessa Conservatory, Joseph Pustylnik was fond of polyphonic music, and even in those years learned to freely write mirror Canon (one of the music polyphonic forms), which can be played on the right to left and Vice versa.

In his mature years he realized the full force of polyphonic thinking for composers and began a systematic study of creativity of the majority of composers that use polyphonic technology of writing, from Johann Sebastian Bach up to the creations of his contemporary Dmitry Shostakovich. As a result, in 1973, he created the fundamental work "The anthology of canon" M, 1973. A huge number of composers uses to this day in their creativity of his most popular repeatedly reprinted scientific creation "A practical guide to writing canon", Leningrad, 1959, 2nd edition in 1975.

=== Main works ===
==== Music ====
- Opera: "Fire" (based on the poems of S. Marshak, 1933), "to be Continued" (anti-fascist Opera was banned by Stalin personally, 1937), "the Fugitive" (on the poem "Narspi" the K. Ivanov, 1952), "Gull" (on motives of the play by Anton Chekhov, 1958)
- Symphonic music: "Suite" (1935), the poem "in memory of Musa Jalil" (1959), Concert piece for violin and Symphony orchestra (1933), "Pièce" for clarinet and orchestra (1956), the monologue "Ice" (lyrics M. Dudin) for voice and orchestra (1975)
- Cantata: "It Is Time!" (based on the poem of A. Tvardovsky "From far to far") for soloists, choir and Symphony orchestra (1966)
- Chamber music: octet "Pages from a notebook for 2 violins, viola, cello, double bass, flute, clarinet and piano (1961), the Quartet for 2 violins, viola and cello with voice (or English horn) (1974), for violin and piano - "Melody" (1947), "Prelude" (1953), "Suite" (1955)
- Vocal cycle to the verses of Musa Jalil (1956), "Three stories for children and adults" (the words of S. Mikhalkov) for voice and piano (1964)
- The Overture for Bayan's orchestra (1949), "Suite" for variety orchestra (1948)
- Choral music to the poems of Musa Jalil
- Music for films such as "Patriot," "Return".
- Song: in the words of S. Marshak, I. Baukova, V. Suslov, and others

==== Scientific edition ====
- "A practical guide to writing canon" L, 1959, 2nd edition 1975
- "Mobile counterpoint and free letter" L, 1967
- "The anthology of canon" M, 1973
- "Principles of tonal organization in modern music" Leningrad, 1979

== Membership in organizations ==
Member of the Leningrad organization of the Union of composers of the USSR.

== Memory ==
He was buried in Moscow on the Donskoy cemetery (columbarium 22)
