= Johann Admoni =

Soviet pianist and composer

- Born: 17 July 1906; Dessau, Dessau-Roßlau, Germany
- Died: 5 September 1979 (aged 73); Leningrad, Soviet Union
- Education: Leningrad State University
- Occupation: Composer

Johánn Admóni (original surname: Krasny, German: Rot, Russian: Иоганн Григорьевич Адмони; 1906 in Dessau – 1979 in Leningrad) was a Soviet composer, pianist, teacher, and public person, the son of the famous St. Petersburg historian, publicist, and Jewish community leader Gregor Red-Admoni (Russian: Григорий Яковлевич Красный-Адмони). He is the elder brother of the famous Soviet linguist Vladimir Admoni. Director of the Seminar of Amateur composers in the Leningrad Composer's House, Soviet Union (now Saint-Petersburg, Russia).

== Biography ==
=== Youth ===
Johann Admoni is the son of the famous St. Petersburg historian, publicist, and Jewish public person Gregor Red-Admoni. As a child he was carrying his father's surname that is Krasny ("Red"), however, since 1917 his father has started using the Hebrew translation of the word Red, which is Admoni. This surname was passed to his children: Johann Admoni and his younger brother Vladimir Admoni, the famous linguist and Germanist. His mother Raisa Pumper, the daughter of a Saint-Petersburg lawyer, moved to Germany because of her family ties, and so Johann Admoni was actually born in the German city Dessau.

In 1922, Johann Admoni entered the Petrograd (later Leningrad) State University the faculty of Social Sciences. He successfully finished it as a lawyer in 1926. However, from his childhood, Johann Admoni was highly interested in music. The basic knowledge he received from his father, who had a talent in singing and he even spent some time in learning how to sing in the Saint Petersburg Conservatory. So, in 1927 Johann Admoni took an exam to enter the Leningrad conservatory where he presented his romances performing them on his own and successfully passed the exam. His teacher became M. O. Steinberg, who had been teaching before the famous composer Dmitry Shostakovich. After finishing the conservatory in 1931 the young composer has moved to Vologda, to work as a musical director and composer in the Drama Theatre.

=== Musical work ===
After receiving the consistent musical education, Johann Admoni writes a lot of romances with poetry of the most famous poets as A. Blok, H. Heine, and others. Later on, imagination of the young composer leads him to creation of the big opera "the Undertaker" and ballets "AO" and "the War against salamanders". Though, the musical style of these works has not been so avant-garde as that one of his contemporary composers. This causes the small support of his music by other musicians of that time. As a result, Johann Admoni stopped his work on big pieces until 1950. In 1951 he writes one of his last big master-pieces that is "Concert for piano with orchestra". He is also creating a lot of music for spectacles and movies.

=== Public activity ===
Working in the Drama Theatre in Vologda, the composer was very attracted to musical public activity, which, from his point of view, was the case only in Saint-Petersburg by that time. And during 1932–1933 he was able to pass his experience in organizing the musical art in Vologda to similar work in local and small theatres of young people in Leningrad. He has organized the first in his practice musical Amateur seminars for ordinary people who did not have an opportunity to enter the conservatory from the first time.

In 1934–1935, he became editor on the Radio; in 1937–1938, he was the director of music broadcasting, director and artistic director of the Concert of the Bureau of the Leningrad Philharmonic society; in 1939–1941 he got a position of the musical director in the "LenStateBandstand". However, just before The Second World War in 1941 he was arrested after "being reported", as happened to many people during that time in the Soviet Union. The following 5 years from 1941 to 1946 he spent in the Stalin camps. He managed to leave this place only thanks to the help of Dmitry Shostakovich, who had by that time become famous worldwide and hence influential.

Not having the ability to live in Leningrad after his release from Gulag, since he was not yet been discharged, Johann Admoni was living in Uzbekistan and teaching musical composition in the Tashkent conservatory. In 1947–1949, overcoming different judicial barriers, Johann Admoni returned to Leningrad, where together with friends including Joseph Pustylnik he promoted the organization of the informal and free Seminar of Amateur composers as a part of the Leningrad Composer's House.

Later on, similar seminars were created in other USSR cities too, but the idea and its realization will be always connected to the name of Johann Admoni. He becomes its timeless director and teacher of composition. Seminar worked within Regulations of the Leningrad Union of composers of the USSR, which allowed students to enter various musical institutes and universities, including the Leningrad Conservatory on the common basis but with better musical background.

For many years Johann Admoni was a Deputy Chairman of the Leningrad Union of composers of the USSR. In 1960–1967, in parallel with his work in the Seminar, he was the musical director of the "Lennauchfilm" film studio. He often appeared as a music critic and reviewer in the Leningrad periodicals also. Johann Admoni died at the age of 73 in 1979.

== Main works ==
- Opera: «the Undertaker» (based on the verses of A. Pushkin, 1935)
- Ballets: «AO» (1936), "the War against salamanders" (based on the works of K. Čapek, 1938) and "Natasha" (based on the works of L. Tolstoy, 1941, unfinished)
- Symphonic poem "Petrograd in 1917" (another name - "Lenin in the Smolny") (1936)
- Cantata: «Still alive» (1960) and "Triptych of the Revolution" (1971) on poems by Soviet poets.
- Concert for piano with orchestra (1951)
- Romances for voice and piano (more than 100), including text of Alexander Blok (more than 20), his Poem "the Circle" (7 romances Triptych "Carmen", Romances "Ksyusha", "Sing", "I remember", "don't sleep", "I nailed", "Korshun", "I am Hamlet"), and others (1938-1950), Three ballads of the Songs of the Western Slavs of A. Pushkin: "Gaiduk Khrizich", "Vlah in Venice", "Funeral song" (1940-1949) "Triptych on text of M. Rylsky"(1946), Triptych on text of A. Mitskevich"(1955), a Ballad in the verses of the Icelandic poets of the twentieth century (1959), romances to the lyrics. R. Burns, H. Hofmannsthal, C. George and others
- Vocal cycles on verses of A. Blok (1957) and H. Heine (1958)
- Film music: Planet of Storms and others
- Song: for the theatre and radio.

== Membership in organisations ==
Member of the Leningrad organisation of the Union of composers of the USSR, Deputy Chairman of this organisation.

== Memory ==
- Buried in the Jewish cemetery in St. Petersburg
- Name of Johann Admoni recorded in the "Red Book of the Soviet (now Russian) Bandstand"
