= The Duel at Silver Creek =

1952 film by Don Siegel

- Theatrical release poster
- Directed by: Don Siegel
- Screenplay by: Gerald Drayson Adams; Joseph Hoffman
- Story by: Gerald Drayson Adams
- Produced by: Leonard Goldstein
- Starring: Stephen McNally; Audie Murphy; Faith Domergue
- Cinematography: Irving Glassberg
- Edited by: Russell F. Schoengarth
- Music by: Herman Stein (uncredited); Joseph Gershenson (musical direction)
- Color process: Technicolor
- Production company: Universal Pictures
- Distributed by: Universal Pictures
- Release date: August 1, 1952 (New York)
- Running time: 77 minutes
- Country: United States
- Language: English
- Box office: $1.25 million (U.S. rentals)

The Duel at Silver Creek is a 1952 American Western film directed by Don Siegel, his first film in the genre. The film stars Audie Murphy, Faith Domergue and Stephen McNally.

== Plot ==
Luke Cromwell, known as the Silver Kid, loses his father to mining claim jumpers. He is deputized by Marshal Lightning Tyrone of Silver City, who wants to defeat the claim jumpers. Tyrone is in love with the treacherous Opal Lacey, who is secretly in league with the claim jumpers, and Cromwell falls for tomboy Dusty Fargo, who is only interested in Tyrone.

== Cast ==
- Audie Murphy as Luke Cromwell / The Silver Kid
- Faith Domergue as Opal Lacey
- Stephen McNally as Marshal Lightning Tyrone
- Susan Cabot as Jane "Dusty" Fargo
- Gerald Mohr as Rod Lacey
- Eugene Iglesias as Johnny Sombrero
- James Anderson as Rat Face Blake (as Kyle James)
- Walter Sande as Pete Fargo
- Lee Marvin as "Tinhorn" Burgess
- George Eldredge as Jim Ryan
- Griff Barnett as Dan "Pop" Muzik

== Production ==
The film's working titles were Claim Jumpers and Hair Trigger Kid.

== Reception ==
In a contemporary review for The New York Times, critic Howard Thompson called the film a "half-hearted attempt to steer a little Western slightly off the beaten trail" and "just another Western, loud and grim, with a stale corn kernel for every flying bullet".

== Legacy ==
Film director Quentin Tarantino has called The Duel at Silver Creek "a very well conceived and executed picture, as well as being obviously a Siegel picture."
