= Seminar of Amateur composers =

The Seminar of Amateur composers - the unique state system of free elective learning in the USSR people gifted in music. It existed in the USSR from the mid 1940s until the late 1980s. Many famous composers and musicians at the beginning of studies were students of these Seminars. For example, Vladimir Dashkevich and Aleksander Averkin, and others.

The idea of such state institutions grew out of the Leningrad branch of the Union of composers of the USSR in the mid 1940s immediately after the great Patriotic War. One of the most prominent ascetics of this idea was the composer and musical activist, son of Gregor Admoni, Johann Admoni. Later (from 1949), he became head of the Leningrad Seminar of Amateur composers.

== The Leningrad Seminar of Amateur composers ==
The Leningrad Seminar of Amateur composers was located in the building of the House of composers in Leningrad (now Saint-Petersburg), Herzen street (today Bolshaya Morskaya street), the house 45. Seminar Manager - Johann Admoni, composer and musical activist, son of Gregor Admoni. Known seminarians - Vladimir Dashkevich, Aleksander Averkin, Evgeny Kliachkin, Vladimir Anisimoff, and others.

After a successful experience with participation The Leningrad Seminar of Amateur composers such workshops have appeared in other cities of the USSR. For example, in Moscow at the Moscow organization of the Union of Soviet Composers of the USSR. The seminars were acting within the framework of the Statutes of the Union of composers. This allowed students-seminarians to act in different musical secondary and higher educational institutions. In particular, students-seminarians passed examinations in the Leningrad Conservatory and Moscow Conservatory on a general basis, but they had a great knowledge in the field of music.

At least two dozen composers-graduates of Conservatories were students of the Seminar in start. An important feature of Seminars - the same professors of the Conservatory taught almost all important musical discipline on an optional basis in Seminars. This allowed participants to actually receive the full amount of the Conservatory knowledge, but without giving them the state Diploma. The last fact in the USSR was very important for the further work of musicians. This forced many of them formally to graduate from the Conservatory. However, at least four seminarians of the Leningrad Seminar of the holder of the mid 1970s became a notable musicians without a Diploma of the Conservatory. There are bard Evgeny Kliachkin, folklorist Alexander Sledin, symphonist and physicist Vladimir Anisimoff, songwriter Evgeny Kalinin, and others.

J. Admoni, J. Pustylnik, A. Mnatsakanian, and other professors from the Leningrad state Conservatory taught in the Leningrad Seminar of Amateur composers. Shortly before the end of the Seminar, the main teachers of the Seminar was joined (in 1977) Abram Ysfin, musicologist and music theorist. Because of the political situation before the revolutionary events of the 1990s in the USSR, Abram Ysfin was unable to hold a Seminar in working condition. (Johann Admoni had died in 1979).
