= Planeta Bur =

1962 film by Pavel Klushantsev

- Original poster by Lev Lvovich Ofrosimov
- Directed by: Pavel Klushantsev
- Written by: Aleksandr Kazantsev; Pavel Klushantsev
- Produced by: L. Presnyakova; Vladimir Yemelyanov
- Starring: Vladimir Yemelyanov; Georgiy Zhzhonov; Gennadi Vernov; Yuri Sarantsev; Georgi Teich; Kyunna Ignatova; Boris Prudkovsky
- Cinematography: Arkadi Klimov
- Edited by: Volt Suslov
- Music by: Johann Admoni; Aleksandr Chernov
- Production company: Lennauchfilm
- Release date: 1962
- Running time: 72 minutes
- Country: Soviet Union
- Language: Russian

Planeta Bur (Russian: Планета бурь, lit. 'Planet of Storms') is a 1962 Sovcolor Soviet science fiction adventure film about landing on Venus. It was scripted by Alexander Kazantsev from his novel with the same name, and co-scripted and directed by Pavel Klushantsev.

In English, the film is often informally referred to as Planet of (the) Storms, Planet of Tempests, or Storm Planet. It was never theatrically released in the U.S. in its original form before appearing on home video in the 1990s. The film is better known to American audiences via the two similar American direct-to-television features Voyage to the Prehistoric Planet and Voyage to the Planet of Prehistoric Women. Both U.S. video features reused the film's special effects and most of its primary footage but filmed additional scenes involving attractive alien women.

== Plot ==
Three Soviet spaceships, Sirius, Vega, and Capella, are on their way from Lunar Station 7 for the first human landing on Venus and the first exploration of the planet. Capella is suddenly struck by a large meteor and is completely destroyed, killing all aboard. After mourning the loss of their friends, the remaining two ships, Sirius and Vega, soon continue on, even though the planned mission required three spaceships. A replacement, Arcturus, will be sent from Earth, but will not arrive for two months.

The cosmonauts aboard Sirius (Ilya, Roman, and Alyosha) and aboard Vega (Ivan and Allan, and the woman, Masha) all agree that proceeding with the landing and exploration is better than waiting two months. So Ivan and Allan, with their large robot assistant "John" (now partly disassembled for flight), descend toward Venus in Vega's glider spacecraft, leaving Masha in orbit to monitor communications between the ships and ground crews. All contact is lost with her after they land in a misty swamp. The gigantic Sirius gently lands vertically on its four shock-absorbing wing struts, but at a different, volcanic-terrain location. Because the atmosphere is poisonous, the men exit Sirius in their spacesuits and helmets. While wandering around some boulders, Aloysha is suddenly attacked and dragged off toward the mouth of a large carnivorous plant, but he is quickly rescued by Ilya and Roman. After photographing the lifeform and sharing jokes about the incident, they proceed to search for Ivan and Allan in their hovercar.

During their journey, they hear what sounds like a distant eerie voice of a woman, and then soon encounter a gigantic, sedate brontosaur-like creature, from which one of the men quickly takes a blood sample from its tail. Meanwhile, after completely assembling robot John, Ivan and Allan are suddenly attacked in the swamp by several human-size tyrannosaur-like beasts, some of which they kill with handguns. They later come across a large, deep ravine and attach strong cords to one of the gigantic trees near the edge of the ravine and to an anchoring boulder. John is able to fell the tree over the ravine, and they walk across it, while listening to recorded music. Allan is later weakened by a wound from the attack at the swamp, so robot John finds a cave for their protection from the wet environment. Both men, however, develop a fever and are soon too weak to stand.

While over an ocean near a beach, the three cosmonauts submerge their hovercar to escape an attack from a large flying pterosaur-like creature. While Underwater, they discover a sculpture of the head of one of the flying creatures, with rubies for eyes and apparently made by an intelligent species. After emerging onto the beach, Alyosha discovers a strange triangular rock, which he keeps.

After they radio-contact robot John and learn of the two fevers, they instruct John to immediately administer life-saving medicine. Ivan and Allan soon recover, just as a boiling hot mudflow surrounds them. Desperately, Ivan has robot John carry them safely across the steaming mud, but the robot over-heats and slows down from their added weight. Robot John attempts to forcibly remove them with its claw and injures Allan in the process. The hovercar suddenly arrives just in time to rescue the two men and quickly leave the area. Robot John, now non-functional from the intense heat, slowly descends into the now deep molten flow. During their trip back to Sirius, they again see another gigantic brontosaur-like creature, and new fin-backed dinosaur-like animals.

After safely returning to Sirius, they discover a recorded, desperate message from Masha saying that she is going to defy her orders from Lunar Station 7 and land on Venus to search for them. This causes much anguish over her not surviving on this hostile world. Unstable ground and a rainstorm are now threatening Sirius, so they must take off immediately. During this, Alyosha discovers that his strange rock has crumbled apart to reveal a small sculpture of a beautiful woman's face, proving there is human life on Venus. He starts shouting to the others about what he has found, as they hurriedly pull him inside Sirius. They quickly launch just before the ground begins to break apart. Rising into space, they suddenly regain radio-contact from Masha, who tells them she finally decided to remain in orbit for them, as she had been ordered. Sirius then proceeds to safely return to Lunar Station 7.

== Personnel ==
=== Cast ===
- Vladimir Yemelyanov as Ilya Vasilyevich Vershinin
- Georgiy Zhzhonov as Roman Bobrov
- Gennadi Vernov as Alyosha
- Yuri Sarantsev as Ivan Shcherba
- Georgi Teich as Allan Kern
- Kyunna Ignatova as Masha Ivanova
- Boris Prudkovsky (Note: 1964 USSR freestyle wrestling champion.) as Robot John

=== Production Team ===
- Z. Anderson as Production Director
- Vladimir Yemelyanov and L. Presnyakova as Producers
- A.V. Markov, K.K. Flyorov, V.G. Denisov, and A.M. Kasatkin as Scientific Advisors

=== Crew ===
- M. Tsybasov and V. Alexandrov as Production Designers
- I. Yegorov, V. Makarov, V. Malakhieva and A. Nadezhdin as Art Directors
- V. Shchelkov as Special Effects Art Director
- A. Klimov as Director of Photography
- A. Lavrentyev as Special Effects Director of Photography
- R. Levitina as Sound Recordist
- A. Belyavskaya and I. Yasnopolskaya as Assistant Directors
- V. Suslov as Film Editor
- Johann Admoni and Alexei Chernov as Music Composers

== American adaptations ==
In 1965, American film producer Roger Corman gained access to the Soviet film footage and hired film student Curtis Harrington to prepare it for an American release. Harrington added several American-made scenes starring Basil Rathbone and Faith Domergue, which replaced scenes of two of the Russian cast, and dubbed the dialogue to English. The resulting film, re-titled Voyage to the Prehistoric Planet, went directly to television from American International Pictures. In the cast and credits, the Russian actors’ names were replaced with fake non-Russian names; for example, the Russian actor Georgiy Zhzhonov was credited as "Kurt Boden".

In 1968, American film director Peter Bogdanovich (under the name Derek Thomas) was hired by Corman to create a second, different American film version, re-titled Voyage to the Planet of Prehistoric Women, to which was added new scenes with American actress Mamie Van Doren and several other attractive women playing Venusians (wearing sea shell brassieres). Also included were some minor scenes from another Russian SF film, Mikhail Karyukov's Nebo Zovyot. This second Americanized version is essentially the same as Corman's first, but retold with a parallel viewpoint of the telepathic Venusian women, whose god (a large pterosaur-like flying creature) is killed by the Earth men, and includes an ending with an ironic twist: The Venusian women find a new god to worship, the now eroded and non-functional robot John. Corman's 2nd version may have had some limited theatrical releases in the American South on the drive-in circuit, but primarily became a "TV movie" released through American International Television.

== Reception ==
In a retrospective on Soviet science fiction film, British director Alex Cox remarked that "in its final minutes, Planet of Storms takes an extraordinary turn. ... I shall not spoil the secret, but it's worth the wait".

The character of the female cosmonaut Masha, portrayed as emotional and arguably mentally unstable, was criticized by Soviet government and press as misogynist, and damaged Klushantsev's career.

== See also ==
- List of films featuring dinosaurs
