= Where Danger Lives =

1950 film by John Farrow

- Theatrical release poster
- Directed by: John Farrow
- Screenplay by: Charles Bennett
- Story by: Leo Rosten
- Produced by: Irving Cummings Jr.
- Starring: Robert Mitchum; Faith Domergue; Claude Rains
- Cinematography: Nicholas Musuraca
- Edited by: Eda Warren
- Music by: Roy Webb
- Production company: RKO Pictures
- Distributed by: RKO Pictures
- Release date: July 8, 1950 (US)
- Running time: 80 minutes
- Country: United States
- Language: English

Where Danger Lives is a 1950 American film noir thriller directed by John Farrow and starring Robert Mitchum, Faith Domergue, and Claude Rains.

== Plot ==
Dr. Jeff Cameron treats a mentally disturbed attempted-suicide victim. She signs herself out of the hospital, but sends a telegram inviting him to meet her. To his surprise, he finds she lives in a mansion. He breaks a date with his nurse girlfriend Julie because he is worried Margo may try to commit suicide again.

The doctor falls in love with Margo, and they begin to see one another. Told she is flying to Nassau with her aged father the next day, a tipsy Jeff shows up unannounced and boldly tells Frederick Lannington that he is in love with the man's daughter. Lannington informs him that Margo is his wife. A stunned Jeff leaves despite Margo's pleas. When he hears a scream, he returns and finds her holding an earring ripped from her ear. Jeff decides to get involved in the domestic dispute. Lannington strikes Jeff to the head with a fireplace poker. In the ensuing struggle, Lannington is knocked down, strikes his head on the floor and falls unconscious. Dazed, Jeff goes to the bathroom; when he returns, he finds the man dead.

Jeff wants to call the police, but Margo insists they would believe it was murder. Capitalizing on the fact that Jeff's judgment is impaired by his injuries and naïveté, she persuades him to run away with her. They first try to use the airline tickets, but spot policemen at the ticket desk. They decide to drive to Mexico instead, taking the precaution of trading in Margo's convertible for a pickup truck provided by larcenous used-car salesman "Honest Hal." Suffering from continuing headaches and mental fog, Jeff diagnoses himself with concussion, warning Margo that it will lead to first paralysis of the extremities, followed by a coma within 24 to 48 hours.

In Postville, Arizona, they are taken to the sheriff, but only because Jeff is not wearing a beard for the town's "Wild West Whiskers Week." After Margo claims they are on their way to Mexico to get married, the police chief tells them marriages are a Postville specialty and insists they get wed there. In their honeymoon suite, Margo hears a radio broadcast about them that discloses she has been undergoing psychiatric treatment. After the couple sneaks away, the police chief identifies Margo from a photograph and alerts the border patrol. It is revealed that Lannington was smothered to death with a pillow.

In a border town, the fugitives sell Margo's $9,000 bracelet to a pawnbroker for $1,000. Seeing they are anxious to avoid the police, he sends them to theater owner Milo DeLong, who offers to smuggle them into Mexico for $1,000. As they wait, Jeff's left side becomes paralyzed. He realizes that Margo is mentally unstable and that she killed her husband; he decides not to go to Mexico. When he tries to stop Margo from leaving, she knocks him down and then smothers him, leaving him for dead; however, he is only rendered unconscious. Awaking, he drags himself downstairs and to the border crossing. When Margo sees him coming, she pulls her pistol out of her purse and starts shooting at him. The police return fire, fatally wounding her. The police consider Jeff an accomplice to Lannington's murder, but before she dies she not only says she acted alone, but that Jeff "didn't even have sense enough to know."

While in hospital recovering, Jeff asks his doctor, "Can I send flowers to San Francisco?" The doctor says, "I think so," steps out into the hall, and sends Julie in to see him.

== Cast ==
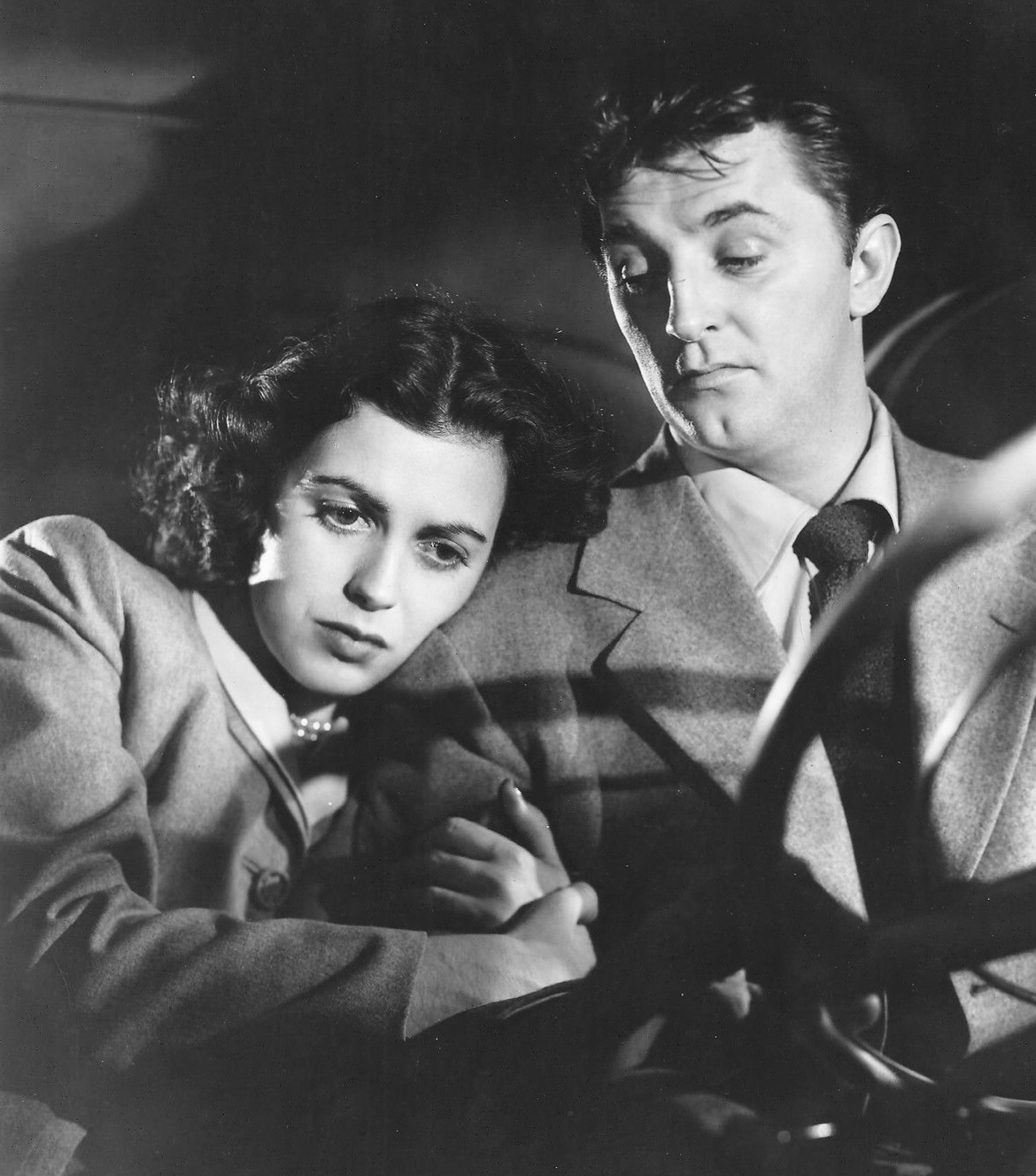
Domergue and Mitchum

- Robert Mitchum as Dr. Jeff Cameron
- Faith Domergue as Margo Lannington
- Claude Rains as Frederick Lannington
- Maureen O'Sullivan as Julie Dorn
- Charles Kemper as Postville Police Chief
- Ralph Dumke as Klauber
- Billy House as Bogardus
- Harry Shannon as Dr. Maynard
- Philip Van Zandt as Milo DeLong
- Jack Kelly as Dr. James Mullenbach
- Lillian West as Mrs. Bogardus
- Ray Teal as Sheriff Joe Borden

== Reception ==
In a contemporary review for The New York Times, critic Bosley Crowther wrote:

A good working-rule is suggested by R. K. O.'s "Where Danger Lives," a pot-boiling melodrama ... This working-rule, stated simply, is: Always inform the police whenever you kill somebody, particularly if it is an accident. The wisdom of this modest precept is demonstrated in reverse and at tedious length in this picture. ... Fogged a bit by several strong drinks and a couple of blows on the head, our hero does not obey his instinct but goes rushing off with the lady into the night. And thus begins a series of adventures on his flight to escape which leads him at last to realize that one should always inform the police. In this solemn demonstration, Mr. Mitchum does a fairly credible job as a man operating in a vacuum and beset by unfortunate circumstances. As the lady who gets him into trouble, Miss Domergue manifests nothing more than a comparatively sultry appearance and an ability to recite simple lines. ... John Farrow is the capable fellow who produced and directed this film. Mr. Farrow has previously done better—and he'd better do so again."

In his analysis of the film's visual style in Film Noir: The Encyclopedia, Alain Silver wrote: "The viewer's first close-up glimpse of Margo is from Cameron's point of view as he bends over her supine body and questions her regarding her attempted suicide. Her naked shoulders peek out seductively from beneath the hospital sheets. Her black hair frames her softly focused face like a demonic halo. His attraction is immediate as he sees in her both sexual object and damsel in distress. By the time she asks rhetorically, 'Why should I live?' Cameron has already supplied an answer. Margo is driven by a hysterical intensity which in turn drives all around her, including the submissive hero, into violence."
