= Atakent (business cooperation center) =

Atakent business cooperation center
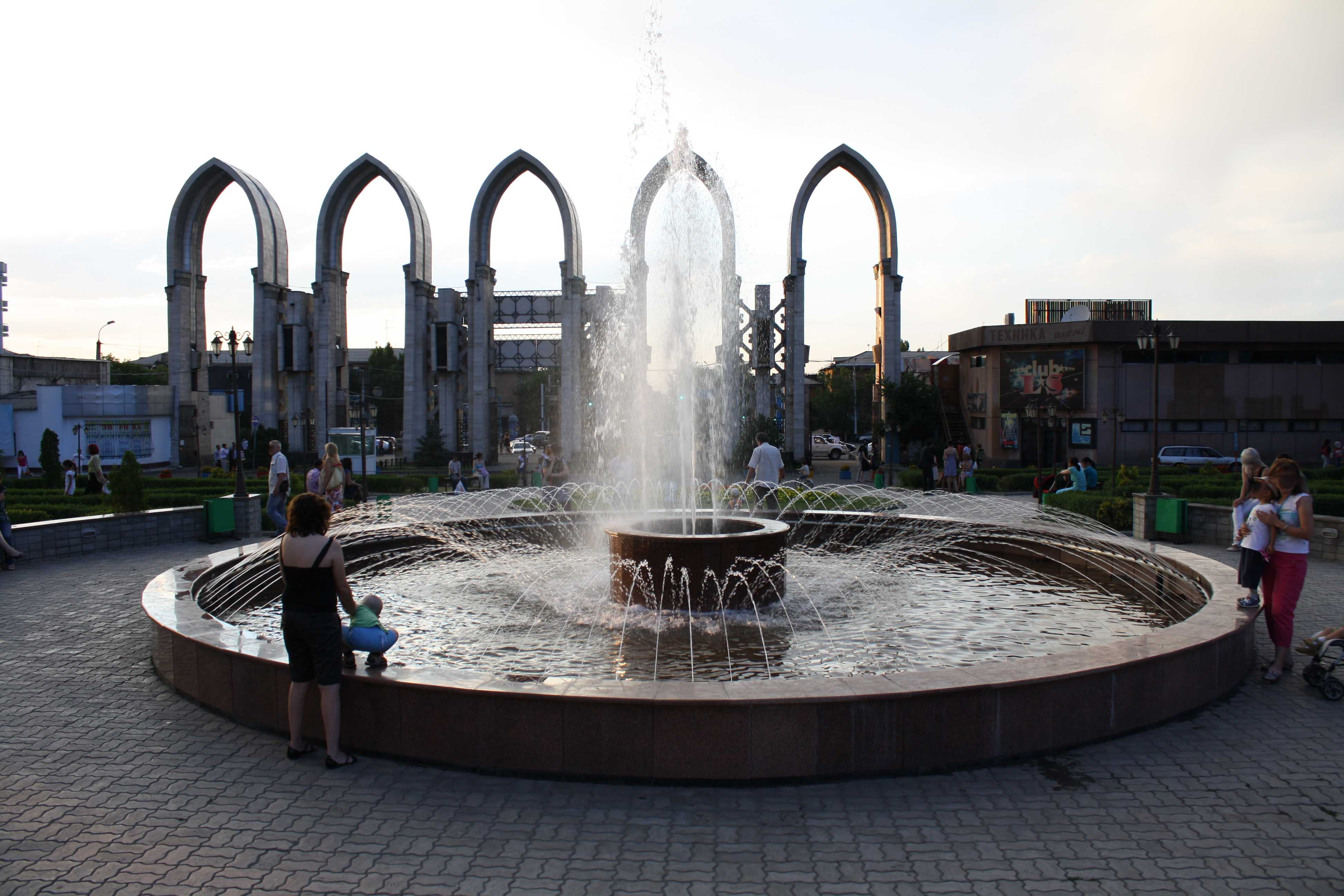
- Interactive map of Atakent business cooperation center
- Location: Almaty

Construction
- Opened: 1961

Website
- atakent.kz

"Atakent" (Russian: Атакент) is a business cooperation center located in Almaty, Kazakhstan. Atakent is a free-visit area and has hosted scientific, industrial, agricultural and other exhibitions and fairs.

The main purpose of Atakent is to promote the development of economic and industrial-commercial relations, business cooperation, and integration of Kazakhstan's economy into the global economy. Prior to the creation of Atakent, EANE KazSSR was permanently headed by Bayan Kuttyzhulovich Dzhumashev, who from the moment of its creation and until the 90s managed it.

== History ==
In Soviet times, according to the ideological canons, the best examples of scientific, industrial and agricultural production were presented to citizens at the Exhibition of Achievements of the National Economy (EANE). Based on these views, in the autumn of 1955 the Exhibition of Achievements of National Economy of the Kazakh SSR was founded as a national economy exhibition, as a center of concentration and propaganda of scientific and technological achievements, dissemination of best practices in various sectors of the economy. In 1959 it was decided to build the EANE complex of KazSSR. For this purpose a ground area of 100 hectares to the west of the Botanical Garden had been chosen. The centerpiece of the composition of the complex was the 5th Liniya (now Auezov Street), with the forecourt in front of the entrance. It was planned to finish construction in 1960, but it was postponed for a year. The exhibition opened to the public in June 1961.

In the formation of the EANE of the Kazakh SSR and the work of the Republican Committee of the Exhibition of Economic Achievements was attended by well-known leaders and experts of the national economy K.I. Satpayev, A.M. Vartanyan, M.A. Bitsky, K.A. Abdugulov, I.O. Omarov. And it was Bayan Kuttyzhulovich Dzhumashev who led it all since its inception. A hereditary farmer. In the years of reconstruction (90s) the concepts of the exhibition center and the transformation of the former EANE into a modern center of business cooperation were reconsidered. There were many proposals, but the way to create a joint-stock company became decisive. Kazakhstan Business Cooperation Center "Atakent" as a joint stock company with state participation was established by the Decree of the Government of the Republic of Kazakhstan No. 688 of August 26, 1992 on the basis of the property complex of the former EANE.

== Architecture ==
Authors of the project according to local historian V.N. Proskurin: architects A. Sokolova, V. Shirshova, L. Fogel, N. Kukushkina. "Atakent" one of the first structures, made by the characteristics of the pavilion type, rectangular in plan, standing on a high stylobate. The walls - frame, on metal structures with glazing, ceilings - trusses. The main entrance, in the loggia at the end of the building has ornamental lattice sun protection throughout its height. The other facades are blank, with additional exits. The core of the building is a two-level showroom with a group of service rooms, located on the side of the main facade. Natural light is insignificant, due to the windows along the perimeter of the building. There are exhibition and information pavilions and open-air exposition areas on the vast territory. International, national and thematic exhibitions and fairs, conventions and conferences are held there. Nowadays the construction has been slightly modified: the pavilions and exterior of the buildings have been redesigned. The complex is located in an ecologically clean area of 650 thousand square meters. In the depths of the territory (bosques, flowerbeds), water cascades in front of all the facades. "Atakent" has an extensive recreational infrastructure, including a water park, and in the south-eastern part of the center is the Palace of marriage "Bakhyt".

In 1983, the entrance was reconstructed. According to the design of Almatygiprogor architects, lancet arches were built instead of pylons supporting flagpoles. The renovation of the architecture also touched the box office pavilions.

== Founders ==
The founders are large national companies, banks, and private entrepreneurs. "Atakent" includes six subsidiary firms and companies: "Atakent-Expo", "Exhibition Service", international trading house "Atakent-Trade", "Atakent-Strakhovaiie", "Atakent-Hotel", "Atadan" - Kazakh-German joint venture. "Atakent" demonstrates the achievements of all sectors of the economy, science, culture and healthcare, as well as examples of foreign and Kazakhstani equipment and modern technologies.

== Titles in different years ==
- 1950-1954 - Pavilion of the Kazakh SSR
- 1963 - EANE Pavilion (Exhibition of Achievements of National Economy)
- From the mid-1990s to the present - Atakent Business Cooperation Center
