= Sailors Have No Questions =

- Russian: У матросов нет вопросов
- Directed by: Vladimir Rogovoy
- Written by: Arkadiy Inin
- Starring: Natalya Kaznacheyeva; Vadim Andreev; Tatyana Pelttser; Mikhail Pugovkin; Nikolai Denisov
- Cinematography: Anatoly Buravchikov; Aleksandr Kovalchuk
- Edited by: Tamara Belyayeva; Tamara Krivosheina
- Music by: Aleksandr Zhurbin
- Release date: 1980
- Running time: 85 minute
- Country: Soviet Union
- Language: Russian

Sailors Have No Questions (Russian: У матросов нет вопросов) is a 1980 Soviet musical comedy film directed by Vladimir Rogovoy.

== Plot ==
In the center of the plot is Alka Shanina, who is going to enter the theater institute, and the sailor Sanya Fokin, who goes to his native village for a wedding. They meet on the plane, which made an emergency landing due to bad weather, as a result of which they spent three days together.

== Cast ==
- Natalya Kaznacheyeva as Alka
- Vadim Andreev as Aleksandr Ivanovich
- Tatyana Pelttser as Klavdiya Mikhajlovna
- Mikhail Pugovkin as Uncle Misha
- Nikolai Denisov
- Lyudmila Khityaeva
- Vadim Zakharchenko
- Yuriy Sarantsev
- Yevgeniya Khanayeva
- Georgiy Yumatov
