= Evgeny Kliachkin =

Evgeny Isaakovich Kliachkin (Russian: Евгений Клячкин; March 23, 1934 – July 30, 1994) was a Soviet and Russian bard, singer, and composer.

== Biography ==
Kliachkin was born on March 23, 1934, in Leningrad, Soviet Union. Kliachkin graduated from the Leningrad Engineering and Building Institute in 1957 and began working as an engineer at various building organizations in Leningrad.

He began to compose songs in 1961. At first his songs were based on other poets' lyrics, but he soon began to write his own as well, accompanying himself on a Russian seven-stringed guitar. In total, Kliachkin composed more than 300 songs, 70 of them set to other poets' lyrics. In 1990, Kliachkin emigrated to Israel with his family. He continued to give concerts in Israel and in the United States. In 1994, he toured Russia.

He died on July 30, 1994, in Israel.

== Awards ==
- Amateur Singers and Composers contest in Leningrad – laureate of the first and the second. (1965, 1967)
- Tourist songs contest in Brest, Belarus – laureate. (1965)
- All-Russia tourist songs contest in Moscow – laureate of the second (1969)

== Works ==
=== Books ===
- "Don't Look Back" song book collection (1994)
- "Looking Back at My Life" (1999)
- "We live till we are loved" (2000)

=== Discography ===
- "Autumn motif" (1987)
- "Pilgrims" (1990)
- "To Russia" (1995)
- "To my contemporaries" (1995)
- "Wet waltz" and "Melody to the boat's rhythm" (1995)
- "To my contemporaries" (1996)
- "Beginnings and ends" (1996)
- "Nothing to feel sorry for". (1999)
- "The best songs" (2000)
- "Evgeny Kliachkin. Russian bards" (2001)

His songs "Don't Look Back," "A Song About The Morning City," "Pskov," "A Child's Picture," "Coming Back," "The Wet Waltz," and "To My Contemporaries" are some of his more notable songs.
