= Bayqadam =

Bayqadam Байқадам Байкадам بايقادام
- Location within Kazakhstan
- Coordinates: 47°21′19″N 59°14′11″E
- Country: Kazakhstan
- Region: Aktobe
- Elevation: 165 m (541 ft)
- Time zone: UTC+5 (West Kazakhstan Time)
  - Summer (DST): UTC+5 (West Kazakhstan Time)

Bayqadam, also known as Baykadam, (Kazakh: Байқадам, Baiqadam, بايقادام; Russian: Байкадам, Baykadam) is a town in Aktobe Region, west Kazakhstan. It lies at an altitude of 165 m (541 ft).
