= Morris Asimow =

American educator (1906–1982)

Morris Asimow (November 27, 1906 – January 10, 1982) was an American educator.

Professor of Engineering Systems at the University of California in Los Angeles

== Career and published work ==
He developed and taught the discipline of engineering design and published one of the early texts on the subject:

Introduction to Design (Prentice-Hall, 1962)

In this book, he was the initial author to discuss morphology in engineering design. His methodology was connected directly to his creation of engineering philosophy. His morphology then, was simple, he stated "design morphology proceeds from the abstract to the concrete". He then gave an early (1950s) rendition of complexity and socioeconomic systems which would make such a process very difficult, and defined the "operational discipline" of engineering as that of design.

== Other books ==
- Torsional vibration in automobiles (1931)
- An investigation of the plastic flow processes involved in drawing (1934)
- Theory and principles of engineering design: Course 106B: (1961)
- Brazil Project: technical assistance for stimulating (1962)
- Brazil Project: technical assistance for stimulation Volumen 2 (1962)
- Brazil project : feasibility studies & preliminary designs: a (1963)
- Modern systems and its application to large scale systems (1966)
- Tale of two planets (1981)

== See also ==
- Engineering design process
