= Alexander Kazantsev =

Soviet writer and ufologist (1906–2002)

- Born: Alexander Petrovich Kazantsev; 2 September 1906; Akmolinsk, Akmolinsk Oblast, Russian Empire
- Died: 13 September 2002 (aged 96); Peredelkino, Russia
- Occupation: Writer
- Writing career
- Genres: Science fiction, popular science, ufology
- Notable awards: Aelita Prize 1981

Alexander Petrovich Kazantsev (Russian: Алекса́ндр Петро́вич Каза́нцев; 2 September 1906 – 13 September 2002) was a popular Soviet and Russian science fiction writer, ufologist and chess composer.

== Biography ==
He was born in Akmolinsk (now Astana, Kazakhstan), Russian Empire. He graduated from Tomsk Polytechnic University, and worked at the Soviet Research Institute of Electromechanics. Kazantsev was a member of the Soviet delegation at the 1939 New York World's Fair. When Germany invaded the Soviet Union in 1941, Kazantsev joined the army. He left military service in 1945 with the rank of colonel, and was awarded a number of orders, including Order of the Patriotic War and Order of the Red Star. From then on, Kazantsev settled in the "literary village" of Peredelkino and concentrated on his writings. He survived the dissolution of the Soviet Union and died in 2002.

== Writings ==
Kazantsev was an enthusiast of the unknown, and a pioneer of Soviet ufology. Many of his works, both fiction and non-fiction, deal with controversial scientific theories.

He researched the Tunguska event and published a number of science fiction, as well as popular science books, on the topic. He believed the Tunguska impact was caused by an alien spacecraft that crash-landed on the Earth.

Kazantsev researched events and legends that he believed were evidence of paleocontacts with extraterrestrials. His novel The Destruction of Faena, an adaptation of Shakespeare's Romeo and Juliet, is based on the hypothetical planet Phaeton that some believe existed in the orbit of the modern asteroid belt. According to the novel, Phaeton was inhabited by a developed civilisation of the phaetae race, who survived the destruction of their planet and brought some of their culture to the prehistorical people of Earth.

Kazantsev was also interested in the Martian canal theory, and used it in his fiction concerning Mars.

He was also a composer of chess endgame studies. In 1975, he was awarded by the Permanent Commission of the FIDE for Chess Compositions (PCCC) the title of International Master of Composition.

== Bibliography ==
Note: of this list, only The Destruction of Faena (Faety), A Visitor From Outer Space, and The Martian have been translated into English.

- Burning Island (Пылающий остров) (1939–1940)
- The Destruction of Faena (Фаэты ru)(1974)
- Stronger than Time (Сильнее времени)
- The Sunbell (Колокол солнца)
- The Dotted Line of Memories (Пунктир воспоминаний)
- The Dome of Hope (Купол надежды)
- A Visitor From Outer Space (Гость из космоса) (1946)
- The Martian (Марсианин) (1946)
- Northern Bridge (Северный мост):
1. Polar Dream (Полярная мечта)
2. Glaciers Return (Льды возвращаются)
3. Bridge of Friendship (Мост дружбы )

=== Film screenwriting ===
- Planet of Storms (Планета бурь)

=== Film appearance ===
- Chariots of the Gods (1970, West German)
- Target...Earth? (1980, U.S.)
