= Eric Asimov =

American wine critic and food critic

- Born: July 17, 1957 (age 69); Bethpage, New York, U.S.
- Occupations: Journalist, The New York Times chief wine critic; author; literary agent
- Spouses: Jacalyn Lee (m. 1989, divorced) Deborah Hofmann (m. 2001)
- Children: 2
- Father: Stanley Asimov
- Relatives: Isaac Asimov (uncle)

Eric Asimov (born July 17, 1957) is an American wine and food critic for The New York Times.

== Early life and education ==
Asimov was born in Bethpage, New York, the son of Stanley Asimov, former vice-president for editorial administration at Newsday, and Ruth Asimov, a ceramic artist. He is a nephew of author Isaac Asimov and brother of San Francisco Chronicle writer Nanette Asimov.

Asimov attended Wesleyan University, graduating in 1980 and did graduate work in American studies at the University of Texas at Austin. Asimov married fellow Wesleyan graduate Jacalyn Lee in 1989; the couple later divorced. Asimov later married Deborah Hofmann.

== Career ==
Having previously worked for The Chicago Sun-Times, Asimov began working for The New York Times in 1984 as an editor in national news. From 1991 to 1994, he was the editor of the Living Section and, from 1994 to 1995 he edited the Styles of The Times section.

In 1992, Asimov conceived and wrote the "$25 and Under" column, dedicated to "restaurants where people can eat lavishly for $25 and under." After several years of penning the column, the term "$25 and under" became less literal and more suggestive of inexpensive fare. Until 1997, the column appeared in the Weekend Section. It then moved to Wednesdays in the "Dining In, Dining Out" section. From 1995 to 1998 Asimov published yearly compilations of the $25 and Under columns as books.

From 2000 to 2004, Asimov co-authored the annual New York Times Guide to Restaurants in New York City with Ruth Reichl and William Grimes.

Asimov became the chief wine critic of The New York Times in 2004, and the "$25 and Under" column was assigned to other critics. Asimov had been writing about wine since 1999. As chief wine critic, he writes two columns, "The Pour" and "Wines of the Times" (or occasionally "Beers of the Times"), both of which appear in the paper on an alternating bi-weekly schedule. In March 2006, Asimov began writing a wine blog, also titled "The Pour".

Asimov has also done freelance work for other publications, including Food & Wine Magazine, Details, Martha Stewart Living and Sommelier Journal.

Between 1999 and 2004, Asimov had a daily spot on The New York Times-owned radio station WQXR (at around 8:25 AM) during which he critiqued food and wine. When he became chief wine critic of The New York Times in 2004, he reduced his time on WQXR to a weekly spot on wine. After The New York Times sold the station to WNYC, the new ownership eliminated many WQXR features.

== Published works ==
- $25 and Under: A Guide to the Best Inexpensive Restaurants in New York, 1995
- $25 and Under: A Guide to the Best Inexpensive Restaurants in New York, 1996
- $25 and Under: A Guide to the Best Inexpensive Restaurants in New York, 1997
- $25 and Under: A Guide to the Best Inexpensive Restaurants in New York, 1998

Co-authored with Ruth Reichl and William Grimes:

- The New York Times Guide to Restaurants in New York City, 2000
- The New York Times Guide to Restaurants in New York City, 2001
- The New York Times Guide to Restaurants in New York City, 2002
- The New York Times Guide to Restaurants in New York City, 2003
- The New York Times Guide to Restaurants in New York City, 2004

== See also ==
- List of wine personalities
