= Vladimir Admoni =

Russian linguist, literary critic, translator, and poet

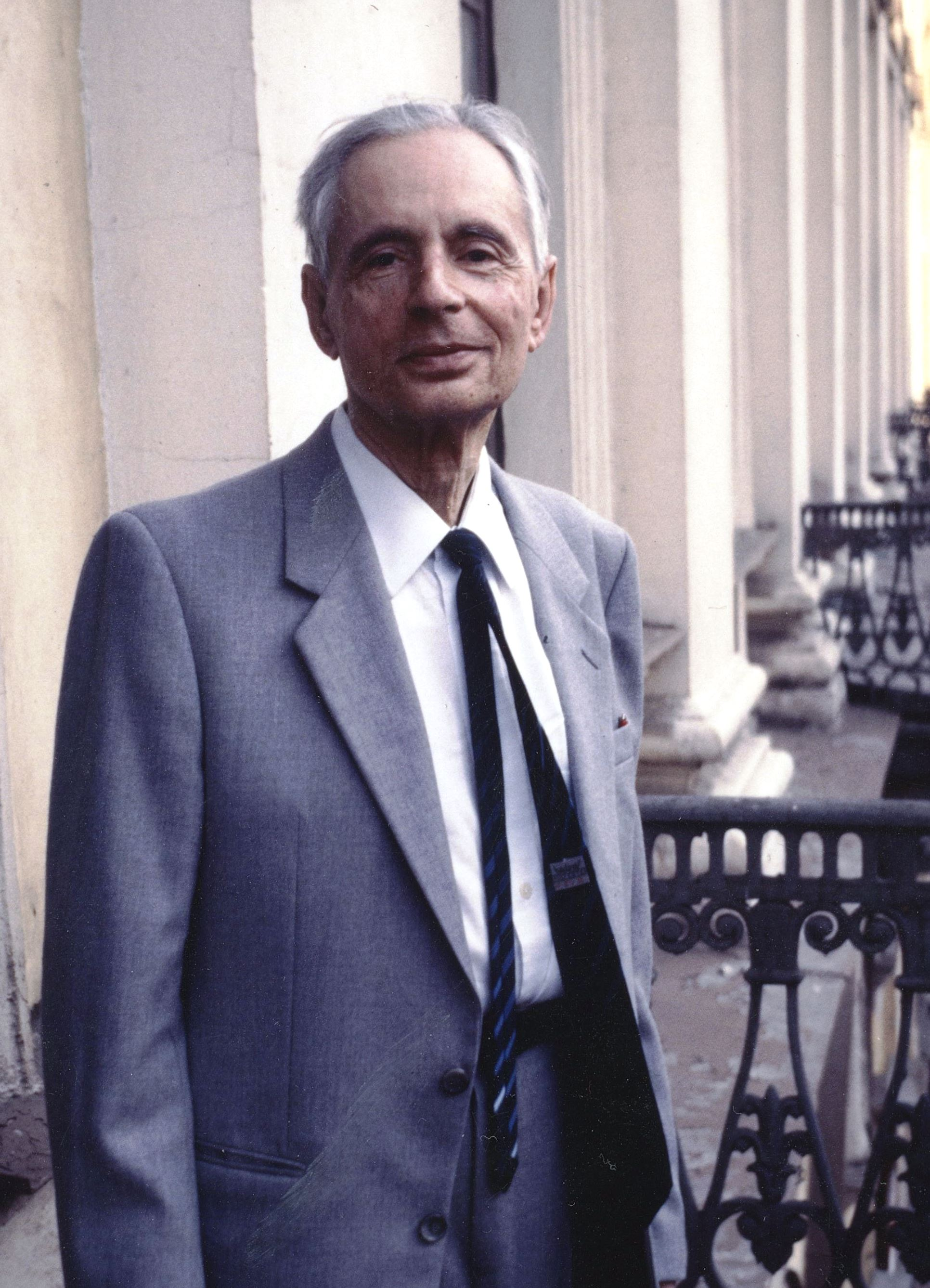
- Wladimir Admoni awaiting a festivity for the 100th birthday of Anna Achmatova on the balcony of the building of the Leningrad (now: Saint Petersburg) Philharmonia in June 1989
- Born: 29 October 1909; St.Petersburg, Russian Empire
- Died: 26 November 1993 (aged 84); St.Petersburg, Russia
- Occupations: linguist, literary critic, translator and poet
- Writing career
- Period: 1909-1993
- Subject: Education

Vladímir Admóni (Russian: Владимир Григорьевич Адмони) (29 October 1909 - 26 November 1993) was a Soviet linguist, literary critic, translator and poet, doctor of philological Sciences (1947), Professor (1948). Correspondent member of Göttingen Academy of Sciences and Humanities, doctor honoris causa at the University of Uppsala. President of the Bureau of the section of literary translation of the Leningrad (now St. Petersburg) branch of USSR (now Russian Federation). He wrote numerous works of the German language, the theory of grammar, essays about German and Scandinavian literature. Verses, prose memoir, poetic and prose translations from German and the Scandinavian languages to Russian (many co-authored with his wife, T. I. Silman). He published a number of own artistic works written in German language or in German translations.

== Biography ==
Admóni was born in St. Petersburg, the son of the famous historian, publicist and Jewish community leader Gregoriy Yakovlevich Krasniy-Admoni; and the younger brother of the composer Адмони, Иоганн Григорьевич. He graduated from the Department of foreign languages at Leningrad State Pedagogical Institute (now Herzen University) (1930). PhD thesis (1939) has been devoted to the works of Jean Paul, doctoral dissertation (1947) - creativity of Henrik Ibsen. He taught at the Pedagogical Institute of Foreign Languages and in Herzen University; headed the Department of German Philology. Since 1960 until the death he was a fellow of the Institute for Linguistic Studies, Russian Academy of Sciences.

In 1964, at the court session on the case of Joseph Brodsky he spoke in his defense, commending him as a poet and translator.

Since 1984, he published several collections of original poems (some are in German or translated into German by the author); in co-authorship with T. I. Silman - prose memoir «We remember» (1993).

Admóni was called a linguist-Germanist by the Leningrad philology school. He paid great attention to the facts of the history of language; he was the first who used the concept of the field structure in the grammatical analysis.

== Main works ==
=== Linguistics ===
- Maintenance of the syntax of modern German language (Russian: Введение в синтаксис современного немецкого языка). M (Moscow)., 1955.
- The historic German syntax (Russian: Исторический синтаксис немецкого языка). M., 1963.
- Ways of development of grammatical system of the German language (Russian: Пути развития грамматического строя в немецком языке). M., 1973.
- Fundamentals of the theory of grammar (Russian: Основы теории грамматики). M.;L (Leningrad)., 1964.
- The grammatical structure as the build system and the General theory of grammar (Russian: Грамматический строй как система построения и общая теория грамматики). M., 1988.
- The system forms of expression of speech (Russian: Система форм речевого высказывания). SPb (Saint-Petersburg)., 1994.

=== Literary criticism ===
- Henrik Ibsen Essay about creativity. 2-nd issue. L., 1989.
- Thomas Mann Essay about creativity. L., 1960. (coauthored with T. I. Silman).
- Poetics and reality: From observations over foreign literature in the XX century L., 1975.
