= Stanley Asimov =

American journalist (1929–1995)

- Born: July 25, 1929; New York City, U.S.
- Died: August 16, 1995 (aged 66); New York City, U.S.
- Occupations: Journalist, Newsday Vice-President
- Notable credit: Newsday
- Spouse: Ruth Sheinaus (m. 1955)
- Children: 3 (including Eric)
- Relatives: Isaac Asimov (brother)

Stanley Asimov (/ˈæzɪmɒv/; July 25, 1929 – August 16, 1995) was an American journalist and vice-president of the Long Island newspaper Newsday.

== Early life and education ==
Asimov was born in Brooklyn, New York, on July 25, 1929. Asimov's parents were Anna Rachel (née Berman) and Judah Asimov, a family of Russian-Jewish millers. He was the brother of author Isaac Asimov and Marcia Minnie Repanes. After becoming established in the U.S., his parents owned a succession of candy stores in which everyone in the family was expected to work. Asimov graduated from New York University and the Columbia Graduate School of Journalism in 1952.

== Career ==
In 1952, Asimov started working as a political reporter for the Long Island Newsday. After several editing positions, he became a publisher assistant in the late 1960s. He also held the position of vice president until the early 1990s before his retirement. Besides working at Newsday, he also taught as an adjunct professor at the Columbia School of Journalism. After retiring, he edited a collection of letters by the author Isaac Asimov, his late brother, titled Yours, Isaac Asimov, published posthumously by Doubleday in October 1995.

== Personal life ==
He married Ruth Evelyn Sheinaus (1922–2018) in 1955. They had two children: wine critic Eric and Nanette. Stanley adopted Ruth's son Dan by her previous marriage.

== Death ==
Asimov died on August 16, 1995, at Mount Sinai Hospital in Manhattan, of leukemia.
