= Igor Kaberov =

Igor Alexandrovich Kaberov
- Игорь Александрович Каберов
- Born: 25 April 1917; Nikulinskoye, Vologodsky Uyezd, Vologda Governorate, Russian Republic
- Died: 2 October 1995 (aged 78); Veliky Novgorod
- Military career
- Allegiance: Soviet Union
- Branch: Soviet Naval Aviation
- Service years: 1939–60
- Rank: Colonel
- Units: 3rd Guards Fighter Aviation Regiment, 61st Fighter Aviation Brigade
- Conflicts: World War II; Siege of Leningrad; Soviet invasion of Manchuria
- Awards: Hero of the Soviet Union

Igor Alexandrovich Kaberov (Russian: Игорь Александрович Каберов; 25 April 1917 – 2 October 1995) was a Soviet Naval Aviation colonel, flying ace, and Hero of the Soviet Union. He fought in the Siege of Leningrad and was awarded the title for downing eight enemy aircraft. Kaberov shot down eleven and shared credit for eighteen enemy aircraft during World War II. He was withdrawn from combat in the summer of 1943 and became an instructor pilot, fighting in the Soviet invasion of Manchuria. He retired from the service in 1960 and lived in Veliky Novgorod, where he was a deputy of the city council.

== Early life ==
Kaberov was born on 25 April 1917 in Nikulinskoye village in Vologda Governorate to a peasant family. After graduating from seventh grade, he became a mechanic at the Vologda Car Repair Plant. He graduated from the Koktebel OSOAVIAKHIM Flight School in 1938. Kaberov became an instructor pilot at the Novgorod Flying Club. He was drafted into the Soviet Navy in 1939. In 1940, Kaberov graduated from the Yeysk Naval Aviation School. He joined the Communist Party of the Soviet Union in 1941.

== World War II ==
Kaberov fought in World War II from the beginning of Operation Barbarossa, the German invasion of the Soviet Union. He was a Polikarpov I-16 pilot in the 5th Fighter Aviation Regiment of the 61st Fighter Aviation Brigade, part of the Air Force of the Baltic Fleet. On 4 August he claimed his first victory, a Messerschmitt Bf 109. Later in August, he rammed a Junkers Ju 388 off the outskirts of Leningrad. Kaberov's aircraft was damaged and he landed in a field near Bolshiye Vrudy. During the fall of 1941 Kaberov flew the Lavochkin-Gorbunov-Gudkov LaGG-3. Kaberov was awarded his first Order of the Red Banner on 13 November 1941. He was awarded the Order of the Red Banner again on 21 October 1942. On 24 November Kaberov received the Order of Lenin. On 24 July 1943 he was awarded the title Hero of the Soviet Union and the Order of Lenin for 397 combat sorties, 92 air battles, and shooting down 8 enemy aircraft, as well as 18 shared kills. During his remaining time in combat Kaberov shot down three more aircraft. From 10 July he served in the 65th Fighter Aviation Regiment.

On 18 August, he was withdrawn from combat and retrained as an instructor. Kaberov became an instructor pilot at the Yeysk Naval Aviation School. From September 1944 he studied at the Higher Officer's Course of Soviet Naval Aviation. In January 1945 he was transferred to the Pacific Fleet Air Force. Between May 1945 and November 1946, Kaberov was a squadron commander in the 17th Fighter Aviation Regiment. In August 1945 he fought in the Soviet invasion of Manchuria. The squadron covered the main base of the Pacific Fleet. Kaberov flew 10 sorties on the Yakovlev Yak-9U during this period. On 19 November he was awarded the Order of the Patriotic War 1st class.

== Postwar ==
After the war, Kaberov continued to serve in Soviet Naval Aviation. From He entered the Air Force Academy in November 1946, graduating in 1952. Between May 1952 and January 1954 Kaberov was assistant commander for air combat tactics of the 639th Fighter Aviation Regiment of the Black Sea Fleet Air Force. From January to November 1954 he was senior navigator of the 49th Fighter Aviation Division. Kaberov led the 661st Fighter Aviation Regiment from November 1954 to January 1960. He was then briefly deputy commander for flight training of the 4th Fighter Aviation Division. Kaberov retired as a colonel in 1960.

He lived in Veliky Novgorod. He worked in a factory, was head of the Novgorod airport, and was later head of the regional DOSAAF air sports club. Kaberov became a deputy of the City Council. In 1975, Voenizdat published his war memoir, titled В прицеле свастика (Swastika in the Gunsight), which was later translated into English in 1999. Kaberov was awarded the Order of the Patriotic War 1st class again on 6 April 1985 for the 40th anniversary of the end of World War II. On 25 November 1989 he became an honorary citizen of the city. He died on 2 October 1995 and was buried at the city's Zapadnom cemetery.

== Personal life ==
Kaberov met his wife, Valentina, while working as an instructor at the Novgorod Flying Club in 1938–39. He married her and had a daughter, Nina.
