= Ivan Dmitriyevich Borisov =

Soviet military pilot

- Иван Дмитриевич Борисов
- Born: 1913; Mytishchi
- Died: 25 December 1939 (aged 25–26)
- Military career
- Allegiance: Soviet Union
- Branch: Soviet Air Force
- Service years: 1932–1939
- Rank: Senior lieutenant
- Unit: 5th Fighter Aviation Regiment
- Conflicts: Battles of Khalkhin Gol; World War II; Winter War †
- Awards: Hero of the Soviet Union

Ivan Dmitriyevich Borisov (Russian: Ива́н Дми́триевич Бори́сов; 1913 – 25 December 1939) was a Soviet military pilot who was posthumously awarded the title Hero of the Soviet Union.

== Biography ==
Ivan Borisov was born in 1913. In December 1939, he served as a command pilot in the 1st squadron, of the 5 IAP-KBF, which was equipped with Polikarpov I-153s. On 23 December his squadron shot down a Finnish aircraft, a VL Kotka, near Paldiski. At 1245 (Finnish time), a Blackburn Ripon IIF of LeLv 36 took off at Paldiski, the Ripon was flown by 24-year-old Kaj Uolevi Söderholm and his observer Esko Antero Huhanantti. The aircraft was not heard from since 1310 by the Mäkiluoto fort, which was located 40 kilometres (25 mi) southwest of Helsinki. 35 minutes later, an explosion was seen in the air to the southwest. It was then reported by the Soviet radio that a Finnish reconnaissance aircraft at Pakri had been shot down by interceptors at 1405 and that both crew members were killed when they tried to escape the burning aircraft. It is believed that this was the aircraft that was shot down by Borisov's crew. In addition to this victory, Borisov flew nine more missions in the Winter War, but was shot down and killed on 25 December 1939, over the Hanko Peninsula. He was awarded the Gold Star of the Hero of the Soviet Union on 7 February 1940.
