= Mars (1968 film) =

1968 Soviet science fiction film

- Directed by: Pavel Klushantsev, A. Belyavskaya, I. Pavljuchenko, Z. Gajlan (special effects)
- Written by: Pavel Klushantsev
- Produced by: Pavel Klushantsev
- Cinematography: Arkady Klimov
- Edited by: I. Zyrin
- Music by: Stanislav Pozhlakov
- Production company: Lennauchfilm
- Release date: 1968
- Running time: 50 minutes
- Country: Soviet Union
- Language: Russian

Mars (Russian: Марс) is a 1968 Soviet science education and science fiction film produced and directed by Pavel Klushantsev.

== Story ==
Like the previous film Luna produced by Klushantsev, the film Mars was created at the intersection of educational science films and science-fiction. It consists of seven pieces, which tell (based on scientific understanding of the 1960s) of the physical conditions on planet Mars, the possibility of life on Mars and what forms it might take, of Martian canals and "seas" of the Red Planet.

In addition, the film includes the director's fantasy hypothetical forms of life on Mars, and of the exploration and colonization of Mars in the near future.

== Crew ==
- writer and producer — P. Klushantsev
- operator — A. Klimov.
- art directors — B. Alexandrov, I. Egorov
- animation director — Z. Gaylan
- special effects operators — A. Romanenko, L. Doctorov
- special effects artist — Z. Mironova
- composer — S. Pozhlakov
- recordist — P. Levitin
- assistant director — A. Belyavskaya, I. Pavlyuchenko
- operator assistants — A. Gubachev, E. Ostriches
- mounting — T. Berstakova
- editor — I. Zyrin
- directors painting — I. Gol'din, G. Novi

== Consultants ==
- Academician AN USSR
  N. P. Barabashov
- Dr. biol. sci
  A. C. Grushvickij
- Dr. biol. sci
  L. K. Lozina-Lozinskij
- Dr. geol.-min. sci
  C. A. Cerpuhov
- Dr. tech. sci
  M. K. Tihonravov
- Dr. med. sci
  C. A. Yazdovskij
- cand. biol. sci
  L. Ju. Budancev
- cand. phys.-math. sci
  A. N. Dadaev
- cand. phys.-math. sci
  K. A. Ljubarskij

== Art features ==
Filmed in typical Klushantsev manner, and synthesizes the two genres — science education movies and science-fiction fantasy.

In the film both animation and special effects techniques are applied.
