= May 23 =

May 23 this year in various calendars
- Saturday, 23 May 2026
Akan	Fomemene
Armenian	7 Margach 1475
Aztec	Ochpaniztli 13, 4 Cipactli
Babylonian	5 Ayaru, 2337 SE
Balinese pawukon	Luang, Pepet, Pasah, Sri, Keliwon, Tungleh, Saniscara of Wariga, Sri, Dangu, Raja
Bengali	9 Joishtho, BS 1433
Chinese	Yin Fire Rooster・Willow Mansion; Fire Horse Year, Month 4, Day 7 (Xiaoman, 13 days until Mangzhong)
Common Era	23 May 2026 CE
Coptic	15 Pashons, AM 1742
Egyptian	7 Phaophi, 2775 NE
Ethiopian	15 Genbot, 2018 Amätä Məhrät
French Republican	Décade I, Quartidi de Prairial de l'Année 234 de la République
Gregorian	23 May, AD 2026
Hebrew	7 Sivan, AM 5786
Hindu	Āśleṣā・Dhruva; Solar: 9 Jyeṣṭha, 1948 SE; Lunisolar: Saptamī, Śukla pakṣa of Adhika Jyeṣṭha, 2083 VE; Rāudra・5127 KY・1,872,718
Icelandic	Laugardagur, 1 Skerpla 2026
Islamic	6 Dhu al-Hijjah, AH 1447 (using tabular method)
ISO week date	2026-W21-6
Japanese	7 Uzuki, Reiwa 8 (Shōman, 14 days until Bōshu)
Julian	10 May, AD 2026 (AM 7534)
Julian day	2461184
Korean	7 Baemdal, 4359 DE
Maya	13.0.13.11.1; 14 Zip, 4 Imix
Roman	ante diem VI Idus Maias, MMDCCLXXIX AUC
Solar Hijri	2 Khordad, SH 1405
Tibetan	7 sa ga, me pho rta 2153 or 1772 or 1000

<<	May					>>
Su	Mo	Tu	We	Th	Fr	Sa
					1	2
3	4	5	6	7	8	9
10	11	12	13	14	15	16
17	18	19	20	21	22	23
24	25	26	27	28	29	30
31
2026

May 23 in recent years
2026 (Saturday)
2025 (Friday)
2024 (Thursday)
2023 (Tuesday)
2022 (Monday)
2021 (Sunday)
2020 (Saturday)
2019 (Thursday)
2018 (Wednesday)
2017 (Tuesday)

May 23 is the 143rd day of the year (144th in leap years) in the Gregorian calendar; 222 days remain until the end of the year.

== Events ==
=== Pre-1600 ===
- 1040 – The Seljuks defeat the Ghaznavids in the battle of Dandanaqan.
- 1308 – Robert the Bruce, king of Scots, defeats John Comyn, earl of Buchan, decisively in the battle of Inverurie.
- 1430 – Joan of Arc is captured at the Siege of Compiègne by troops from the Burgundian faction.
- 1498 – Girolamo Savonarola is burned at the stake in Florence, Italy.
- 1533 – The marriage of King Henry VIII to Catherine of Aragon is declared null and void.
- 1568 – Dutch rebels led by Louis of Nassau defeat Jean de Ligne and his loyalist troops in the Battle of Heiligerlee, opening the Eighty Years' War.

=== 1601–1900 ===
- 1609 – Official ratification of the Second Virginia Charter takes place.
- 1618 – The Third Defenestration of Prague precipitates the Thirty Years' War.
- 1706 – John Churchill, 1st Duke of Marlborough, defeats a French army under Marshal François de Neufville, duc de Villeroy at the Battle of Ramillies.
- 1788 – South Carolina became the eighth state to ratify the United States Constitution.
- 1793 – Battle of Famars during the Flanders Campaign of the War of the First Coalition.
- 1829 – Accordion patent granted to Cyrill Demian in Vienna, Austrian Empire.
- 1844 – Báb: A merchant of Shiraz announces that he is a Prophet and founds a religious movement. He is considered to be a forerunner of the Baháʼí Faith.
- 1846 – Mexican–American War: President Mariano Paredes of Mexico unofficially declares war on the United States.
- 1863 – The General German Workers' Association, a precursor of the modern Social Democratic Party of Germany, is founded in Leipzig, Kingdom of Saxony.
- 1873 – The Canadian Parliament establishes the North-West Mounted Police, the forerunner of the Royal Canadian Mounted Police.
- 1900 – American Civil War: Sergeant William Harvey Carney is awarded the Medal of Honor for his heroism in the Assault on the Battery Wagner in 1863.

=== 1901–present ===
- 1905 – Abdul Hamid II, Sultan of the Ottoman Empire, publicly announces the creation of the Ullah millet for the Aromanians of the empire, which had been established one day earlier. For this reason, the Aromanian National Day is usually celebrated on May 23, although some do so on May 22 instead.
- 1907 – The unicameral Parliament of Finland gathers for its first plenary session.
- 1911 – The New York Public Library is dedicated.
- 1915 – World War I: Italy joins the Allies, fulfilling its part of the Treaty of London.
- 1919 – Sheikh Mahmud Barzanji, a Kurdish sheikh and at-the-time governor of the Slêmanî Province of British Iraq, initiates the first Mahmud Barzanji revolt.
- 1932 – In Brazil, four students are shot and killed during a manifestation against the Brazilian dictator Getúlio Vargas, which resulted in the outbreak of the Constitutionalist Revolution several weeks later.
- 1934 – American bank robbers Bonnie and Clyde are ambushed by police and killed in Bienville Parish, Louisiana.
- 1934 – The Auto-Lite strike culminates in the "Battle of Toledo", a five-day melée between 1,300 troops of the Ohio National Guard and 6,000 picketers.
- 1939 – The U.S. Navy submarine USS Squalus sinks off the coast of New Hampshire during a test dive, causing the death of 24 sailors and two civilian technicians. The remaining 32 sailors and one civilian naval architect are rescued the following day.
- 1941 – World War II: German paratroopers start a series of mass executions of Greek civilians in Missiria for their participation in the ongoing Battle of Crete.
- 1945 – World War II: Heinrich Himmler, head of the Schutzstaffel, commits suicide while in Allied custody.
- 1945 – World War II: Germany's Flensburg Government under Karl Dönitz is dissolved when its members are arrested by British forces.
- 1946 – The start of a two-day tornado outbreak across the Central United States that spawned at least 15 significant tornadoes.
- 1948 – Thomas C. Wasson, the US Consul-General, is assassinated in Jerusalem, Israel.
- 1949 – Cold War: The Western occupying powers approve the Basic Law and establish a new German state, the Federal Republic of Germany.
- 1951 – Tibetans sign the Seventeen Point Agreement with China.
- 1960 – A tsunami caused by an earthquake in Chile the previous day kills 61 people in Hilo, Hawaii.
- 1971 – Seventy-eight people are killed when Aviogenex Flight 130 crashes on approach to Rijeka Airport in present-day Rijeka, Croatia (then the Socialist Federal Republic of Yugoslavia).
- 1971 – The Intercontinental Hotel in Bucharest opens, becoming the second-tallest building in the city.
- 1978 – A Tupolev Tu-144 crashes near the Russian town of Yegoryevsk, killing two.
- 1980 – The Shining, the psychological horror film directed by Stanley Kubrick, is premiered on 10 screens in New York City and Los Angeles on the Memorial Day weekend.
- 1991 – Aeroflot Flight 8556 crashes at Pulkovo Airport, killing 13.
- 1992 – Italy's most prominent anti-mafia judge Giovanni Falcone, his wife and three body guards are killed by the Corleonesi clan with a half-ton bomb near Capaci, Sicily. His friend and colleague Paolo Borsellino will be assassinated less than two months later, making 1992 a turning point in the history of Italian Mafia prosecutions.
- 1995 – The first version of the Java programming language is released.
- 1998 – The Good Friday Agreement is accepted in a referendum in Northern Ireland with roughly 75% voting yes.
- 2002 – The "55 parties" clause of the Kyoto Protocol is reached after its ratification by Iceland.
- 2006 – Alaskan stratovolcano Mount Cleveland erupts.
- 2008 – The International Court of Justice (ICJ) awards Middle Rocks to Malaysia and Pedra Branca (Pulau Batu Puteh) to Singapore, ending a 29-year territorial dispute between the two countries.
- 2013 – A freeway bridge carrying Interstate 5 over the Skagit River collapses in Mount Vernon, Washington.
- 2014 – Seven people, including the perpetrator, are killed and another 14 injured in the Isla Vista attacks near the campus of University of California, Santa Barbara.
- 2015 – At least 30 people are killed as a result of floods and tornadoes in Texas, Oklahoma, and northern Mexico.
- 2016 – Two suicide bombings, conducted by the Islamic State of Iraq and Syria, kill at least 45 potential army recruits in Aden, Yemen.
- 2016 – Eight bombings are carried out by the Islamic State of Iraq and Syria in Jableh and Tartus, coastline cities in Syria. One hundred eighty-four people are killed and at least 200 people injured.
- 2017 – Philippine President Rodrigo Duterte declares martial law in Mindanao, following the Maute's attack in Marawi.
- 2021 – A cable car falls from a mountain near Lake Maggiore in northern Italy, killing 14 people.
- 2021 – Ryanair Flight 4978 is forced to land by Belarusian authorities to detain dissident journalist Roman Protasevich.
- 2022 – Anthony Albanese of the Australian Labor Party is sworn in as the 31st Prime Minister of Australia after winning the 2022 Australian federal election, ending 9 years of conservative rule.

== Births ==
=== Pre-1600 ===
- 635 – Kʼinich Kan Bahlam II, Mayan king (died 702)
- 675 – Perumbidugu Mutharaiyar II, King of Mutharaiyar dynasty, Tamil Nadu, India
- 1052 – Philip I of France (died 1108)
- 1100 – Emperor Qinzong of Song (died 1161)
- 1127 – Uijong of Goryeo, Korean monarch of the Goryeo dynasty (died 1173)
- 1330 – Gongmin of Goryeo, Korean ruler (died 1374)
- 1586 – Paul Siefert, German composer and organist (died 1666)

=== 1601–1900 ===
- 1606 – Juan Caramuel y Lobkowitz, Spanish mathematician and philosopher (died 1682)
- 1614 – Bertholet Flemalle, Flemish Baroque painter (died 1675)
- 1617 – Elias Ashmole, English astrologer and politician (died 1692)
- 1629 – William VI, Landgrave of Hesse-Kassel, noble of Hesse-Kassel (died 1663)
- 1707 – Carl Linnaeus, Swedish botanist, physician, and zoologist (died 1778)
- 1718 – William Hunter, Scottish-English anatomist and physician (died 1783)
- 1729 – Giuseppe Parini, Italian poet and educator (died 1799)
- 1730 – Prince Augustus Ferdinand of Prussia, Prussian prince and general (died 1813)
- 1734 – Franz Mesmer, German physician and astrologer (died 1815)
- 1741 – Andrea Luchesi, Italian organist and composer (died 1801)
- 1789 – Franz Schlik, Austrian earl and general (died 1862)
- 1790 – Jules Dumont d'Urville, French admiral and explorer (died 1842)
- 1790 – James Pradier, French neoclassical sculptor (died 1852)
- 1794 – Ignaz Moscheles, Czech pianist and composer (died 1870)
- 1795 – Charles Barry, English architect, designed the Upper Brook Street Chapel and Halifax Town Hall (died 1860)
- 1800 – Rómulo Díaz de la Vega, Mexican general and president (1855) (died 1877)
- 1810 – Margaret Fuller, American journalist and critic (died 1850)
- 1817 – Manuel Robles Pezuela, Unconstitutional Mexican interim president (died 1862)
- 1820 – James Buchanan Eads, American engineer, designed the Eads Bridge (died 1887)
- 1820 – Lorenzo Sawyer, American lawyer and judge (died 1891)
- 1824 – Ambrose Burnside, American general and politician, 30th Governor of Rhode Island (died 1881)
- 1834 – Jānis Frīdrihs Baumanis, Latvian architect (died 1891)
- 1834 – Carl Bloch, Danish painter and academic (died 1890)
- 1837 – Anatole Mallet, Swiss mechanical engineer and inventor (died 1919)
- 1837 – Józef Wieniawski, Polish pianist and composer (died 1912)
- 1838 – Amaldus Nielsen, Norwegian painter (died 1932)
- 1840 – George Throssell, Irish-Australian politician, 2nd Premier of Western Australia (died 1910)
- 1844 – ʻAbdu'l-Bahá, Iranian religious leader (died 1921)
- 1848 – Otto Lilienthal, German pilot and engineer (died 1896)
- 1855 – Isabella Ford, English author and activist (died 1924)
- 1861 – József Rippl-Rónai, Hungarian painter (died 1927)
- 1863 – Władysław Horodecki, Polish architect (died 1930)
- 1864 – William O'Connor, American fencer (died 1939)
- 1865 – Epitácio Pessoa, Brazilian jurist and politician, 11th President of Brazil (died 1942)
- 1875 – Alfred P. Sloan, American businessman and philanthropist (died 1966)
- 1882 – William Halpenny, Canadian pole vaulter (died 1960)
- 1883 – Douglas Fairbanks, American actor, director, producer, and screenwriter (died 1939)
- 1884 – Corrado Gini, Italian sociologist and demographer (died 1965)
- 1887 – Thoralf Skolem, Norwegian mathematician and theorist (died 1963)
- 1887 – Nikolai Vekšin, Estonian-Russian sailor and captain (died 1951)
- 1887 – C. R. M. F. Cruttwell, English historian (died 1941)
- 1888 – Adriaan Roland Holst, Dutch writer (died 1976)
- 1888 – Zack Wheat, American baseball player and police officer (died 1972)
- 1889 – Ernst Niekisch, German educator and politician (died 1967)
- 1890 – Herbert Marshall, English-American actor and singer (died 1966)
- 1891 – Pär Lagerkvist, Swedish novelist, playwright, and poet, Nobel Prize laureate (died 1974)
- 1892 – Albert Spencer, 7th Earl Spencer, British peer (died 1975)
- 1896 – Felix Steiner, Russian-German SS officer (died 1966)
- 1897 – Jimmie Guthrie, Scottish motorcycle racer (died 1937)
- 1898 – Scott O'Dell, American soldier, journalist, and author (died 1989)
- 1898 – Josef Terboven, German soldier and politician (died 1945)
- 1899 – Jeralean Talley, American super-centenarian (died 2015)
- 1900 – Hans Frank, German lawyer and politician (died 1946)
- 1900 – Franz Leopold Neumann, German lawyer and theorist (died 1954)

=== 1901–present ===
- 1908 – John Bardeen, American physicist and engineer, Nobel Prize laureate (died 1991)
- 1908 – Hélène Boucher, French pilot (died 1934)
- 1908 – Tomiko Itooka, Japanese supercentenarian (died 2024)
- 1908 – Annemarie Schwarzenbach, Swiss author and photographer (died 1942)
- 1910 – Margaret Wise Brown, American author and educator (died 1952)
- 1910 – Hugh Casson, English architect and academic (died 1999)
- 1910 – Scatman Crothers, American actor and comedian (died 1986)
- 1910 – Franz Kline, American painter and academic (died 1962)
- 1910 – Artie Shaw, American clarinet player, composer, and bandleader (died 2004)
- 1911 – Lou Brouillard, Canadian boxer (died 1984)
- 1911 – Paul Augustin Mayer, German cardinal (died 2010)
- 1911 – Betty Nuthall, English tennis player (died 1983)
- 1912 – Jean Françaix, French pianist and composer (died 1997)
- 1912 – John Payne, American actor (died 1989)
- 1914 – Harold Hitchcock, English visionary landscape artist (died 2009)
- 1914 – Celestine Sibley, American journalist and author (died 1999)
- 1914 – Barbara Ward, Baroness Jackson of Lodsworth, English economist, journalist, and prominent Catholic layperson (died 1981)
- 1915 – S. Donald Stookey, American physicist and chemist, invented CorningWare (died 2014)
- 1917 – Edward Norton Lorenz, American mathematician and meteorologist (died 2008)
- 1918 – Denis Compton, English cricketer and sportscaster (died 1997)
- 1919 – Robert Bernstein, American author and playwright (died 1988)
- 1919 – Ruth Fernández, Puerto Rican contralto and a member of the Puerto Rican Senate (died 2012)
- 1919 – Betty Garrett, American actress, singer, and dancer (died 2011)
- 1920 – Helen O'Connell, American singer (died 1993)
- 1921 – Humphrey Lyttelton, British jazz musician and broadcaster (died 2008)
- 1923 – Alicia de Larrocha, Catalan-Spanish pianist (died 2009)
- 1923 – Irving Millman, American virologist and microbiologist (died 2012)
- 1924 – Karlheinz Deschner, German author and activist (died 2014)
- 1925 – Joshua Lederberg, American biologist and geneticist, Nobel Prize laureate (died 2008)
- 1926 – Basil Salvadore D'Souza, Indian bishop (died 1996)
- 1926 – Joe Slovo, Lithuanian-South African activist and politician (died 1995)
- 1926 – Aileen Hernandez, American union organizer and civil rights activist (died 2017)
- 1928 – Rosemary Clooney, American singer and actress (died 2002)
- 1928 – Nigel Davenport, English actor (died 2013)
- 1928 – Nina Otkalenko, Russian runner (died 2015)
- 1929 – Ulla Jacobsson, Swedish-Austrian actress (died 1982)
- 1929 – Vic Stasiuk, Canadian ice hockey player (died 2023)
- 1930 – Friedrich Achleitner, German poet and critic (died 2019)
- 1931 – Barbara Barrie, American actress (died 2026)
- 1932 – Kevork Ajemian, Syrian-French journalist and author (died 1998)
- 1933 – Joan Collins, English actress
- 1933 – Ove Fundin, Swedish motorcycle racer
- 1934 – Robert Moog, electronic engineer and inventor of the Moog synthesizer (died 2005)
- 1935 – Lasse Strömstedt, Swedish author (died 2009)
- 1936 – Ingeborg Hallstein, German soprano and actress
- 1936 – Charles Kimbrough, American actor (died 2023)
- 1939 – Michel Colombier, French-American composer and conductor (died 2004)
- 1939 – Reinhard Hauff, German director and screenwriter
- 1940 – Bjørn Johansen (musician), Norwegian saxophonist (died 2002)
- 1940 – Gérard Larrousse, French race car driver
- 1940 – Cora Sadosky, Argentinian mathematician and academic (died 2010)
- 1941 – Zalman King, American director, producer, and screenwriter (died 2012)
- 1941 – Rod Thorn, American basketball player, coach, and executive
- 1942 – Gabriel Liiceanu, Romanian philosopher, author, and academic
- 1942 – Kovelamudi Raghavendra Rao, Indian director, screenwriter, and choreographer
- 1943 – Peter Kenilorea, Solomon Islands politician, 1st Prime Minister of the Solomon Islands (died 2016)
- 1943 – Alan Walden, American music manager and record label founder (died 2026)
- 1944 – John Newcombe, Australian tennis player and sportscaster
- 1945 – Padmarajan, Indian director, screenwriter, and author (died 1991)
- 1946 – David Graham, Australian golfer
- 1947 – Jane Kenyon, American poet and translator (died 1995)
- 1948 – Myriam Boyer, French actress, director, and producer
- 1949 – Daniel DiNardo, American cardinal
- 1949 – Alan García, Peruvian lawyer and politician, twice President of Peru (died 2019)
- 1950 – Martin McGuinness, Irish republican and Sinn Féin politician, Deputy First Minister of Northern Ireland (died 2017)
- 1950 – Richard Chase, American serial killer (died 1980)
- 1951 – Anatoly Karpov, Russian chess player
- 1951 – Antonis Samaras, Greek economist and politician, 185th Prime Minister of Greece
- 1952 – Martin Parr, English photographer and journalist (died 2025)
- 1954 – Gerry Armstrong, Northern Irish international footballer
- 1954 – Marvelous Marvin Hagler, American boxer and actor (died 2021)
- 1955 – Luka Bloom, Irish singer-songwriter and guitarist
- 1956 – Andrea Pazienza, Italian illustrator and painter (died 1988)
- 1956 – Ursula Plassnik, Austrian politician and diplomat, Foreign Minister of Austria
- 1956 – Buck Showalter, American baseball player, coach, and manager
- 1958 – Mitch Albom, American journalist, author, and screenwriter
- 1958 – Drew Carey, American actor, game show host, and entrepreneur
- 1958 – Lea DeLaria, American actress and singer
- 1959 – Marcella Mesker, Dutch tennis player and sportscaster
- 1960 – Linden Ashby, American actor
- 1961 – Daniele Massaro, Italian footballer and manager
- 1961 – Norrie May-Welby, Scottish Australian gender activist
- 1961 – Dave Babych, Canadian ice hockey player
- 1962 – Karen Duffy, American actress
- 1963 – Viviane Baladi, Swiss mathematician
- 1964 – Ruth Metzler, Swiss lawyer and politician
- 1965 – Manuel Sanchís Hontiyuelo, Spanish footballer
- 1965 – Tom Tykwer, German director, producer, screenwriter, and composer
- 1965 – Melissa McBride, American actress
- 1965 – Paul Sironen, Australian rugby league player
- 1966 – H. Jon Benjamin, American actor, comedian, writer, and producer
- 1966 – Graeme Hick, Zimbabwean-English cricketer and coach
- 1966 – Gary Roberts, Canadian ice hockey player and coach
- 1967 – Luís Roberto Alves, Mexican footballer
- 1967 – Anna Ibrisagic, Swedish politician
- 1967 – Philip Selway, English musician
- 1968 – Guinevere Turner, American actress and screenwriter
- 1970 – Bryan Herta, American race car driver and businessman, co-founded Bryan Herta Autosport
- 1971 – George Osborne, English journalist and politician, former Chancellor of the Exchequer
- 1972 – Rubens Barrichello, Brazilian race car driver
- 1972 – Poppy King, Australian entrepreneur
- 1972 – Martin Saggers, English cricketer and umpire
- 1973 – Maxwell, American singer-songwriter and producer
- 1974 – Jewel, American singer-songwriter, guitarist, actress, and poet
- 1974 – Ken Jennings, American game show host and contestant
- 1974 – Manuela Schwesig, German politician, German Federal Minister of Family Affairs
- 1976 – Ricardinho, Brazilian footballer and manager
- 1976 – Andy Selva, Sammarinese footballer and manager
- 1977 – Richard Ayoade, British actor, director and writer
- 1977 – Ilia Kulik, Russian figure skater
- 1978 – Scott Raynor, American drummer
- 1979 – Rasual Butler, American basketball player (died 2018)
- 1979 – Brian Campbell, Canadian ice hockey player
- 1980 – Theofanis Gekas, Greek footballer
- 1980 – Chris Gethard, American actor, comedian and writer
- 1980 – Ben Ross, Australian rugby league player
- 1981 – Tim Robinson, American comedian, actor, and screenwriter
- 1983 – Silvio Proto, Belgian-Italian footballer
- 1984 – Hugo Almeida, Portuguese footballer
- 1985 – Sebastián Fernández, Uruguayan footballer
- 1985 – Teymuraz Gabashvili, Russian tennis player
- 1985 – Wim Stroetinga, Dutch cyclist
- 1985 – Ross Wallace, Scottish footballer
- 1986 – Ryan Coogler, American film director and screenwriter
- 1986 – Alexei Sitnikov, Russian-Azerbaijani figure skater
- 1986 – Alice Tait, Australian swimmer
- 1986 – Ruben Zadkovich, Australian footballer
- 1987 – Gracie Otto, Australian actress, director, producer, and screenwriter
- 1987 – Bray Wyatt, American wrestler (died 2023)
- 1988 – Rosanna Crawford, Canadian biathlete
- 1988 – Angelo Ogbonna, Italian footballer
- 1988 – Morgan Pressel, American golfer
- 1989 – Ezequiel Schelotto, Argentine-Italian footballer
- 1990 – Dan Evans, British tennis player
- 1990 – Kristína Kučová, Slovak tennis player
- 1990 – Oliver Venno, Estonian volleyball player
- 1991 – Aaron Donald, American football player
- 1991 – Lena Meyer-Landrut, German singer-songwriter
- 1991 – César Pinares, Chilean footballer
- 1992 – Laerte do Vando, Brazilian politician
- 1994 – Esa Lindell, Finnish ice hockey player
- 1996 – Katharina Althaus, German ski jumper
- 1996 – Emmanuel Boateng, Ghanaian footballer
- 1996 – Răzvan Marin, Romanian footballer
- 1996 – Çağlar Söyüncü, Turkish footballer
- 1997 – Pedro Chirivella, Spanish footballer
- 1997 – Coy Craft, American footballer
- 1997 – Joe Gomez, English footballer
- 1997 – Maximilian Kilman, English footballer
- 1997 – Gustaf Nilsson, Swedish footballer
- 1997 – Sam Timmins, New Zealand basketball player
- 1998 – Sérgio Sette Câmara, Brazilian racing driver
- 1998 – Salwa Eid Naser, Bahraini track and field sprinter
- 1998 – Luca de la Torre, American soccer player
- 1999 – James Charles, American internet personality
- 1999 – Trinidad Cardona, American singer and songwriter
- 1999 – Sandro Mamukelashvili, Georgian-American basketball player
- 2000 – Felipe Drugovich, Brazilian-Italian racing driver
- 2000 – Israel Reyes, Mexican footballer
- 2001 – Brennan Johnson, Welsh footballer
- 2005 – Alexandra Eala, Filipino tennis player
- 2007 – Rayane Messi, French footballer

== Deaths ==
=== Pre-1600 ===
- 230 – Urban I, pope of the Catholic Church
- 922 – Li Sizhao, Chinese general and governor
- 962 – Guibert of Gembloux, Frankish abbot (born 892)
- 1125 – Henry V, Holy Roman Emperor (born 1086)
- 1304 – Jehan de Lescurel, French poet and composer
- 1338 – Alice de Warenne, Countess of Arundel, English noble (born 1287)
- 1370 – Toghon Temür, Mongol emperor (born 1320)
- 1423 – Antipope Benedict XIII (born 1328)
- 1498 – Girolamo Savonarola, Italian friar and preacher (born 1452)
- 1523 – Ashikaga Yoshitane, Japanese shōgun (born 1466)
- 1524 – Ismail I, First Emperor of Safavid Empire (born 1487)
- 1591 – John Blitheman, English organist and composer (born 1525)

=== 1601–1900 ===
- 1662 – John Gauden, English bishop (born 1605)
- 1670 – Ferdinando II de' Medici, Grand Duke of Tuscany (born 1610)
- 1691 – Adrien Auzout, French astronomer and instrument maker (born 1622)
- 1701 – William Kidd, Scottish pirate (born 1645)
- 1749 – Abraham ben Abraham, Polish martyr (born 1700)
- 1752 – William Bradford, English-American printer (born 1663)
- 1754 – John Wood, the Elder, English architect, designed The Circus and Queen Square (born 1704)
- 1783 – James Otis Jr., American lawyer and politician (born 1725)
- 1813 – Géraud Duroc, French general and diplomat (born 1772)
- 1815 – Gotthilf Heinrich Ernst Muhlenberg, American clergyman and botanist (born 1753)
- 1841 – Franz Xaver von Baader, German philosopher and theologian (born 1765)
- 1855 – Charles Robert Malden, English lieutenant and explorer (born 1797)
- 1857 – Augustin-Louis Cauchy, French mathematician and academic (born 1789)
- 1868 – Kit Carson, American general (born 1809)
- 1886 – Leopold von Ranke, German historian and academic (born 1795)
- 1893 – Anton von Schmerling, Austrian politician (born 1805)
- 1895 – Franz Ernst Neumann, German mineralogist, physicist, and mathematician (born 1798)

=== 1901–present ===
- 1906 – Henrik Ibsen, Norwegian director, playwright, and poet (born 1828)
- 1908 – François Coppée, French poet and author (born 1842)
- 1920 – Svetozar Boroević, Croatian-Austrian field marshal (born 1856)
- 1921 – August Nilsson, Swedish shot putter and tug of war competitor (born 1872)
- 1934 – Clyde Barrow, American criminal (born 1909)
- 1934 – Mihkel Martna, Estonian journalist and politician (born 1860)
- 1934 – Bonnie Parker, American criminal (born 1910)
- 1937 – John D. Rockefeller, American businessman and philanthropist, founded the Standard Oil Company and Rockefeller University (born 1839)
- 1938 – Frederick Ruple, Swiss-American painter (born 1871)
- 1942 – Panagiotis Toundas, Greek composer and conductor (born 1886)
- 1945 – Heinrich Himmler, German commander and politician, Reich Minister of the Interior and head of the SS (born 1900)
- 1947 – Charles-Ferdinand Ramuz, Swiss author and poet (born 1878)
- 1949 – Jan Frans De Boever, Belgian painter and illustrator (born 1872)
- 1956 – Gustav Suits, Latvian-Estonian poet and politician (born 1883)
- 1960 – Georges Claude, French engineer and inventor, created Neon lighting (born 1870)
- 1962 – Louis Coatalen, French engineer (born 1879)
- 1963 – August Jakobson, Estonian author and politician (born 1904)
- 1965 – David Smith, American sculptor (born 1906)
- 1975 – Moms Mabley, American comedian and actor (born 1894)
- 1979 – S. Selvanayagam, Sri Lankan geographer and academic (born 1932)
- 1981 – Gene Green, American baseball player (born 1933)
- 1981 – Rayner Heppenstall, English author and poet (born 1911)
- 1981 – George Jessel, American actor, singer, and producer (born 1898)
- 1981 – David Lewis, Belarusian-Canadian lawyer and politician (born 1909)
- 1986 – Sterling Hayden, American actor (born 1916)
- 1989 – Georgy Tovstonogov, Russian director and producer (born 1915)
- 1989 – Karl Koch, German computer hacker (born 1965)
- 1991 – Wilhelm Kempff, German pianist and composer (born 1895)
- 1991 – Jean Van Houtte, Belgian academic and politician, 50th Prime Minister of Belgium (born 1907)
- 1991 – Fletcher Markle, Canadian director, screenwriter, and producer (born 1921)
- 1992 – Kostas Davourlis, Greek footballer (born 1948)
- 1992 – Giovanni Falcone, Italian lawyer and judge (born 1939)
- 1994 – Olav Hauge, Norwegian poet (born 1908)
- 1996 – Kronid Lyubarsky, Russian journalist and activist (born 1934)
- 1998 – Telford Taylor, American general and lawyer (born 1908)
- 1999 – Owen Hart, Canadian-American wrestler (born 1965)
- 2002 – Big Bill Neidjie, Australian activist and last speaker of the Gaagudju language (born c. 1920)
- 2002 – Sam Snead, American golfer and journalist (born 1912)
- 2006 – Lloyd Bentsen, American colonel and politician, 69th United States Secretary of the Treasury (born 1921)
- 2006 – Kazimierz Górski, Polish footballer and manager (born 1921)
- 2008 – Iñaki Ochoa de Olza, Spanish mountaineer (born 1967)
- 2008 – Utah Phillips, American singer-songwriter and poet (born 1935)
- 2009 – Roh Moo-hyun, South Korean soldier and politician, 9th President of South Korea (born 1946)
- 2010 – José Lima, Dominican-American baseball player (born 1972)
- 2010 – Simon Monjack, English director, producer, and screenwriter (born 1970)
- 2011 – Xavier Tondo, Spanish cyclist (born 1978)
- 2012 – Paul Fussell, American historian, author, and academic (born 1924)
- 2013 – Epy Guerrero, Dominican baseball player, coach, and scout (born 1942)
- 2013 – Hayri Kozakçıoğlu, Turkish police officer and politician, 15th Governor of Istanbul Province (born 1938)
- 2013 – Georges Moustaki, Egyptian-French singer-songwriter and guitarist (born 1934)
- 2013 – Flynn Robinson, American basketball player (born 1941)
- 2014 – Mikhail Egorovich Alekseev, Russian linguist and academic (born 1949)
- 2014 – Madhav Mantri, Indian cricketer (born 1921)
- 2015 – Anne Meara, American actress, comedian and playwright (born 1929)
- 2015 – Aleksey Mozgovoy, Pro-Russian Ukrainian separatist leader (born 1975)
- 2015 – Alicia Nash, Salvadoran-American physicist and engineer (born 1933)
- 2015 – John Forbes Nash Jr., American mathematician and academic, Nobel Prize laureate (born 1928)
- 2017 – Roger Moore, English actor (born 1927)
- 2020 – Hana Kimura, Japanese professional wrestler (born 1997)
- 2021 – Ron Hill, English long-distance runner (born 1938)
- 2021 – Eric Carle, American children's book designer, illustrator, and writer best known for The Very Hungry Caterpillar (born 1929)
- 2024 – Caleb Carr, American military historian and author (born 1955)
- 2024 – Morgan Spurlock, American filmmaker (born 1970)

== Holidays and observances ==
- Aromanian National Day
- Christian feast day:
  - Aaron the Illustrious (Syriac Orthodox Church)
  - Desiderius of Vienne
  - Giovanni Battista de' Rossi
  - Julia of Corsica
  - Michael of Synnada
  - Nicolaus Copernicus and Johannes Kepler (Episcopal Church (USA))
  - Quintian, Lucius and Julian
  - William of Perth
  - May 23 (Eastern Orthodox liturgics)
- Constitution Day (Germany)
- Labour Day (Jamaica)
- Students' Day (Mexico)
- World Turtle Day
