= Mikhail Alekseyev (disambiguation) =

Mikhail Alekseyev (1857–1918) was an Imperial Russian Army general.

Mikhail Alekseyev may also refer to:

- Mikhail Alekseyev (writer) (1918–2007), Russian Soviet writer and editor
- Mikhail Alekseev (linguist) (1949–2014), Russian linguist
- Mikhail Alekseyev (banker) (born 1964), Russian banker and chairman of the Central Bank of Russia
