= Road to the Stars =

1957 Soviet science fiction film

- Screenplay by: Boris Liapunov; Vasily Solovyov
- Produced by: P. Klushantsev
- Music by: S. Shatiryan
- Production company: Lennauchfilm
- Release date: November 1957 (USSR)
- Running time: 49 minutes
- Country: Soviet Union
- Language: Russian

Road to the Stars (Russian: Дорога к звёздам, IPA: [dɐˈroɡə ɡ_ˈzvʲɵzdəm]) is a 1957 Soviet biographical film by Pavel Klushantsev (credited as P. Klushantsev). Combining elements of science educational films and speculative science fiction, the film was groundbreaking for its use of special effects to depict life in space.

== Synopsis ==
The first half of the film is historical and educational in nature, depicting mostly the life and scientific contributions of Konstantin Tsiolkovsky, along with the basic principles of rocket propulsion, ballistics, and space flight. It also depicts the contributions of Max Valier and Robert Goddard.

The second half of the film is speculative in nature, with various scenes showing crewed space flight (4 years before the flight of Yuri Gagarin), a large space station (in great detail), and the first person on the Moon (12 years before the flight of Apollo 11), as well as lunar colonization.

== Cast ==
- Giorgy Solovyov — Konstantin Tsiolkovsky

== Crew ==
- Writers — Boris Liapunov, Vasily Solovyov
- Director — Pavel Klushantsev
- Operator — Mikael Galper
- Composer — S. Shatiryan
- Artist — M. Tsybasov
- Sound Engineer — RP Leviti
- Operators animation — A.V. Lavrentiev and A. M. Romanenko
- Animation artist — V. Shelkov

== Art features ==
The film was far ahead of its time in terms of cinematic special effects. In particular, it features a wheel-shaped space station eleven years before Kubrick's famous 1968 film 2001: A Space Odyssey.

== Awards ==
- 1958. 2nd prize at CCF I (Moscow)
- 1958. Bronze medal: Б. Kudricha MCF technical and scientific films Belgrade.

== Legacy ==
Road to the Stars is believed to have significantly influenced Stanley Kubrick's techniques in 2001: A Space Odyssey (1968), particularly in its accurate depiction of weightlessness and a rotating space station. Encyclopedia Astronautica describes some scenes from 2001 as a "shot-for-shot duplication of Road to the Stars". Specific comparisons of shots from the two films have been analyzed by filmmaker Alessandro Cima. A 1994 article in American Cinematographer says, "When Stanley Kubrick made 2001: a Space Odyssey in 1968, he claimed to have been first to fly actor/astronauts on wires with the camera on the ground, shooting vertically while the actor's body covered the wires" but observes that Klushantsev had preceded him in this.
