= Luna (1965 film) =

1965 Soviet science fiction film

- Directed by: Pavel Klushantsev; G. Ershov
- Screenplay by: Pavel Klushantsev
- Cinematography: Arkady Klimov
- Music by: Alexander Chernov
- Production company: Lennauchfilm
- Release date: 1965 (USSR)
- Running time: 50 minutes
- Country: Soviet Union
- Language: Russian

Luna (Russian: Луна́, "Moon") is a Soviet popular science and science fiction film directed by Pavel Klushantsev.

== Story ==
The first part of the film — popular science — tells of recent (mid-1960s) achievements in the exploration of the Moon. Scientists discuss the hypothesis of the origin of the lunar maria, about the temperature of the lunar surface and the supposed properties of the lunar soil.

The second part of the film — science fiction — shows how the Moon in the near future will be developed by people from a hypothetical first lunar mission to lunar cities and laboratories.

== Honors ==
The film won the "Golden Seal of Trieste" at the IV International Science-Fiction Film Festival (Italy, 1966).

== Crew ==
- Written and directed by — Pavel Klushantsev
- Operator — Arkady Klimov
- Artist — Yuri Shvets
- Animation director — G. Ershov
- Composer — Alexander Chernov

== Scientists involved ==
- N. P. Barabashev - Scientific Consultant
- V. A. Fedoretc
- A. V. Markov - Scientific Consultant
- V. L. Kozlov
- M. N. Markov
- V. S. Troitsky - Scientific Consultant
- V. V. Sharonov - Scientific Consultant
- Nadezhda Nikolaevna Sytinskaya - Scientific Consultant
- A. V. Povalyaev - Scientific Consultant

== Artistic features ==
Filmed in typical Pavel Klushantsev manner synthesizing two genres: popular science movies and science-fiction fantasy. In the second, "science-fiction" part of the film, animation and trick photography are applied.

== Technical data ==
- Ratio 1.33:1
- Color
- 50 minutes
