= Yuri Shvets (disambiguation) =

Yuri Shvets may refer to:

- Yuri Shvets (KGB officer), former Soviet KGB officer, former Rezident spy of the PGU KGB SSSR in USA.
- Yuri Pavlovich Shvets (1902—1972), Soviet cinematic artist.
