= Yakov Nazarov =

Soviet and Russian documentary film director

- Яков Назаров
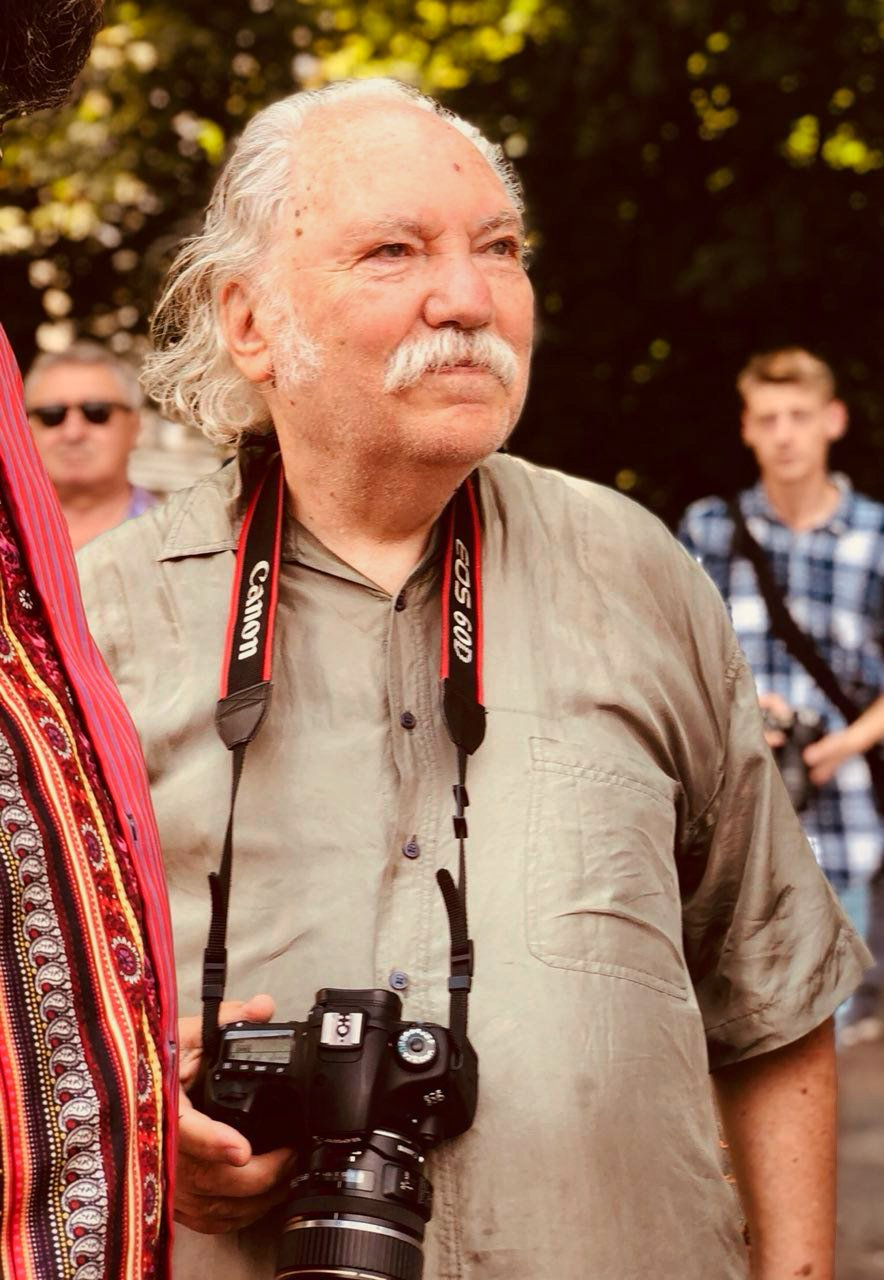
- Born: Yakov Sergeyevich Nazarov; March 15, 1942 (age 84); Baku, Azerbaijan Soviet Socialist Republic, Soviet Union
- Education: Baku Industrial Institute (1964); VGIK (1973, workshop of B. Altshuler)
- Occupations: Film director (documentary), photographer, artist
- Years active: 1973–present
- Notable work: One-on-One with Time, Russian Captivity, Contemporary of the Century

Yakov Sergeyevich Nazarov (Яков Сергеевич Назаров; born 15 March 1942, Baku, Azerbaijan SSR) is a Soviet and Russian documentary film director, photographer, and artist. He is the creator of more than 70 documentary films and the author of a series of portrait films about prominent figures of Russian culture, and a member of the Union of Cinematographers of Russia and the Union of Photo Artists of Russia. His works have been repeatedly recognized at Russian and international film festivals, and some films have been acquired by major museums.

== Biography ==
He was born on 15 March 1942 in Baku.
In 1964, he graduated from the Faculty of Chemical Technology at the Baku Industrial Institute (his initial profession was chemist).
In 1966, he first picked up a camera and began working in photography.
In 1973, he graduated from the directing faculty of VGIK (workshop of B. Altshuler).
From 1973 to 1985, he worked at the film studio Lennauchfilm.
In 1985, he moved to Moscow, where he lives and works to this day.

== Creative activity ==
=== Cinema ===
He directed more than 70 documentary films. Notable works include:

- 1989 — "Один на один со временем" (One-on-One with Time), a film about the artist Solomon Rossine, acquired by the Centre Pompidou in Paris.
- 1995 – Russian Captivity (Русский плен), winner of the Stalker film festival, and recipient of an award from the German Association of Former Prisoners of War (Munich).

In 2000, he worked on the television cycle "Осенние портреты" (Autumn Portraits), dedicated to figures of Russian culture: Hilarion Golitsyn, Dmitry Zhilinsky, Alla Pologova and many others.

From 1998 to 2001, he directed the documentary cycle "Парижский журнал" (Parisian Journal), dedicated to cultural figures who emigrated to France after the 1917 revolution.

Author of educational film cycles:

- 2005 — "Художественная культура Древнего Египта" (Art Culture of Ancient Egypt)
- 2006 — "Художественная культура Месопотамии" (Art Culture of Mesopotamia)
- 2007 — "Художественная культура Древней Америки" (Art Culture of Ancient America)
- 2008 — "Художественная культура Древней Греции" (Art Culture of Ancient Greece)

==== Selected filmography ====
- 1976 — Охочий люд (Hunting Folk)
- 1978 — На ком земля держится (On Whom the Earth Rests)
- 1989 — Один на один со временем (One-on-One with Time)
- 1995 — Русский плен (Russian Captivity)
- 1997 — Подземный переход (Underground Passage)
- 1998 — Партизанский роман (Partisan Novel)
- 2000 — Портрет легендарной пианистки (Portrait of a Legendary Pianist. About Maria Yudina)
- 2001 — Павел Флоренский (Pavel Florensky)
- 2002 — Сергей Дягилев (Sergei Diaghilev)
- 2003 — Сталинград – Париж, далее везде... (Stalingrad – Paris, Everywhere Beyond... About Viktor Nekrasov)
- 2004 — Ровесник века (Contemporary of the Century. About Moisey Feigin)
- 2005 — Музыкант от бога (Musician from God)
- 2006 — Дети проходных дворов (Children of Courtyards)
- 2007 — В борьбе обретёшь ты право своё... (In Struggle You Will Gain Your Right...)
- 2008 — Русский модерн (Russian Modern. 2 episodes)
- 2009 — Что день грядущий нам готовит (What the Coming Day Will Bring)
- 2011 — Ворованный воздух (Stolen Air. About the poet Igor Kholin)
- 2013 — Иногда не забывайте (Sometimes Don't Forget. About Alexei Khvostenko)

=== Photography ===
Since 1966, he has been active in photography and has participated in ten photo exhibitions, eight of them solo.
In 1987, the photo album "Моя Москва" (My Moscow) (100 photographs) was published.
In 2006, the author's "Альбом фотографий" (Photo Album) was published.
In 2019, the album "Свой путь" (Own Way) was released.
In 2020, the photo album "Одесса" (Odessa).

=== Graphics and painting ===
In 1987, a series of graphic portraits was presented at the exhibition "Лик – лицо – личина" (Face – Visage – Mask) at the Moscow Cinema Center.
In 2013, the exhibition "Фотография – Кино – далее пастель" (Photography – Cinema – then Pastel) was held at the Kino Gallery.
In 2014, the pastel exhibition "Субъективная реальность" (Subjective Reality) at the House of Cinema and at the Yaroslavl Art Museum, which acquired his pastel portrait "Горящие ноты" (Burning Notes) of pianist M. V. Yudina.
In 2015, the personal exhibition "Артпоиск" (Art Search) was held in Odessa.
In 2016, the album "Свой путь" (Own Way) was published.

== Style and aesthetics ==
According to art critic Paola Volkova, Nazarov shoots with "an ordinary old camera", not being fascinated by technical innovations, but instead preferring artistic vision and the aesthetics of simple yet expressive forms. His work unites cinema, photography, and graphics: the heroes of his films and portraits are intellectuals with a strong inner world and aesthetic independence. According to the author himself, the norm of aesthetics in which he works differs somewhat from generally accepted boundaries. For him, the cracks that time inflicts on the surrounding world give this world greater aesthetic expressiveness.

== Membership ==
- Union of Cinematographers of Russia
- Union of Photo Artists of Russia

== Publications ==
- 1987 — "Моя Москва" (My Moscow) photo album, 100 photographs
- 2006 — "Альбом фотографий" (Photo Album)
- 2016 — "Свой путь" (Own Way)
- 2020 — "Одесса" (Odessa)

== Recognition and awards ==
His films have been awarded prizes at many international and Russian film festivals. In particular:

- "Русский плен" (Russian Captivity) — prize at the "Stalker" festival, award of the German Association of Former Prisoners of War (Munich).
- "Портрет легендарной пианистки" (Portrait of a Legendary Pianist) — prize at the international festival of television films (Austria).
- Laureate of the International Film Festival of Films about Culture at the Centre Pompidou (France).

== Interesting facts ==
In 1980, the film cycle "История Советской музыки" (History of Soviet Music), shot by order of the Union of Soviet Friendship Societies, was banned from screening. The release license was revoked at the personal insistence of the First Secretary of the Union of Russian Composers, Tikhon Khrennikov.
