= Georgui Castañeda =

Peruvian chess grandmaster (born 1976)

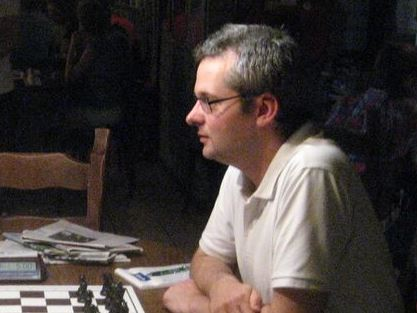

Personal information
- Born: Georgy Horkhevich Kastanieda; August 2, 1976 (age 49) Mytishchi, Russian SFSR, Soviet Union

Chess career
- Country: Russia (until 2000); Peru (since 2000)
- Title: Grandmaster (2009)
- FIDE rating: 2487 (July 2026)
- Peak rating: 2522 (November 2011)

Georgui Castañeda Tsounova is a Peruvian chess grandmaster.

== Chess career ==
He was awarded the Grandmaster title in 2009, after achieving his norms at the:

- 3rd Afremeevoi Memorial in July 2006
- 2nd Kotov Memorial in July 2007

In 2013, he served as the main coach of Russian Chess School held in Moscow.

In 2024, he served as a lecturer for the FIDE Chessable Academy.
