= Sharonov =

Sharonov may refer to:

- Sharonov (surname)
- 2416 Sharonov, asteroid
- Sharonov (lunar crater)
- Sharonov (Martian crater)
