= Nadezhda Sytinskaya =

Soviet astromer

Nadezhda Nikolaevna Sytinskaya
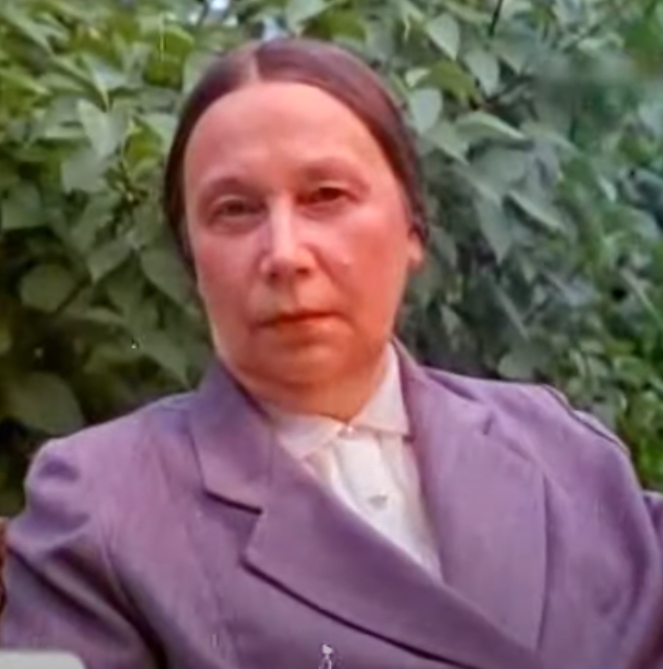
- Born: February 22, 1906; Tallinn, Estonia
- Died: July 4, 1974 (aged 68); Leningrad, Russian SFSR, USSR
- Citizenship: Russian, Soviet
- Education: Saint Petersburg State University
- Scientific career
- Fields: Planetary science

Nadezhda Nikolaevna Sytinskaya (Russian: Надежда Николаевна Сытинская; 22 February 1906 – 4 July 1974) was a Soviet Astronomer and academic originally from Tallinn who studied meteoroids and planetary surfaces. Much of her work was done at the Academy of Sciences of Uzbekistan's Tashkent Observatory and at Pulkovo Observatory in Leningrad.

== Biography ==
After graduating from Leningrad State University, Sytinskaya worked as a professional researcher in Tashkent until 1930 when she returned to her alma mater to continue her work now at Pulkovo under the Russian Academy of Sciences. At some point after 1934 she was conferred the degree of Doctor of Sciences in Physics and Mathematics by the Soviet Higher Attestation Commission following a successful dissertation defense.

In 1941 as the German army approached the city prior to the Siege of Leningrad the observatory at Pulkovo was heavily damaged by shelling and the staff were evacuated out of the city. Following the conclusion of World War II, Sytinskaya returned to Leningrad State University where in 1951 she attained an appointment to full professor. She would go on to remain at the university for the rest of her life up until 1974. She is buried at the Krasnenkoye cemetery in St. Petersburg.

== Career ==
Sytinskaya is credited with, alongside her husband Vsevolod Sharonov, co-formulating the meteor-slag theory of lunar surface regolith formation which hypothesized that the lunar soil was mainly the result of chemical and structural changes to porous surface rock due to meteoroid bombardment vaporizing a thin upper layer into fine dust. This is the theory which was confirmed in 1966 when Luna-9 became the first human-made object to land on the Moon.

Her research also included obtaining estimates of the density of the Draconids Meteor Shower, developing techniques of meteor photometry, creating a system for obtaining absolute photometry of the moon, investigations of the color excess of asteroids, and early estimates of the atmospheric pressure of Mars. She also introduced the concept of "smoothness factor" as a parameter for determining of the degree of surface roughness exhibited by planetary bodies. In 1965 Sytinskaya starred in the film Luna directed by Pavel Klushantsev, working also as a scientific consultant throughout its filming.

Sytinskaya crater on Mars is named in her honor.
