= Yuri Pavlovich Shvets =

Soviet cinematic artist

Yuri Pavlovich Shvets (Russian: Юрий Павлович Швец; born in Poltava 1902 – 1972) was a Soviet cinematic artist, famous for art and scenery especially of fantasy and science-fiction films.

As a youth, Shvets held several jobs, then studied at and graduated from both the Music and Drama Institute of Mykola Lysenko and the Arts Institute in Kiev .

The scientific accuracy of Shvets' work was praised by the Russian rocket scientist Konstantin Tsiolkovsky when the two met in 1934.

Shvets did artwork for over fifty films, including:

- (1935) Kosmicheskiy reys (Cosmic Journey or Space flight)
- (1935) Novii Gulliver (The New Gulliver)
- (1959) Nebo Zovyot (The Sky Calls)
- (1951) Вселенная (Universe)
- (1965) Luna (Moon)
- (1968) Марс (Mars)
