= Rasskazovo (inhabited locality) =

Rasskazovo (Russian: Рассказово) is the name of several inhabited localities in Russia.

Urban localities

- Rasskazovo, a town in Tambov Oblast

Rural localities

- Rasskazovo, Republic of Mordovia, a settlement in Semileysky Selsoviet of Kochkurovsky District in the Republic of Mordovia; 53°57′N 45°22′E
- Rasskazovo, Novosibirsk Oblast, a selo in Karasuksky District of Novosibirsk Oblast; 53°40′N 77°55′E
- Rasskazovo, Primorsky Krai, a selo in Khankaysky District of Primorsky Krai
- Rasskazovo, Tver Oblast, a village in Kholmetskoye Rural Settlement of Oleninsky District in Tver Oblast
