= Aleksei Yeroshkin =

Russian footballer

Personal information
- Full name: Aleksei Andreyevich Yeroshkin
- Date of birth: 20 January 1987 (age 39)
- Place of birth: Mytishchi, Moscow Oblast, Russian SFSR
- Height: 1.71 m (5 ft 7 1/2 in)
- Position: Defender

Senior career*
Years	Team	Apps	(Gls)
2005–2006	FC Spartak Moscow	0	(0)
2007	FC Zelenograd	6	(0)
2008	FC Lukhovitsy	17	(0)
2009	FC Gubkin	17	(0)
2010	FC Khimki	4	(0)
2011	FC Vityaz Podolsk	15	(0)
2012	FC Kaluga	7	(0)
2012	FC Metallist Korolyov		
2013	FC Khimki	6	(0)
2014	FC Nosta Novotroitsk	8	(0)
- * Club domestic league appearances and goals

Aleksei Andreyevich Yeroshkin (Russian: Алексей Андреевич Ерошкин; born 20 January 1987) is a former Russian professional football player.

== Club career ==
He played in the Russian Football National League for FC Khimki in 2010.
