= Artyom Serikov =

Russian ice hockey player

- Born: 28 December 2000 (age 25) Mytishchi, Russia
- Height: 6 ft 1 in (185 cm)
- Weight: 203 lb (92 kg; 14 st 7 lb)
- Position: Defense
- Shoots: Left
- KHL team Former teams: Neftekhimik Nizhnekamsk; Spartak Moscow; Chicago Wolves
- NHL draft: Undrafted
- Playing career: 2020–present

Artyom Andreevich Serikov (Russian: Артём Андрéевич Сéриков; born 28 December 2000) is a Russian professional ice hockey defenceman who is currently playing under contract to HC Neftekhimik Nizhnekamsk in the Kontinental Hockey League (KHL).

== Playing career ==
Serikov grew up playing hockey in a sports school in Dmitrov. He made his junior hockey debut in 2017 with the Kapitan Stupino in the Junior Hockey League (MHL), before playing for the Krylya Sovetov Moscow in 2018–19. In 2019, he signed a three-way contract between the MHL, Supreme Hockey League (VHL), and the KHL, splitting his time between the MHK Spartak Moscow (the MHL affiliate of HC Spartak Moscow), Khimik Voskresensk of the VHL, and HC Spartak Moscow of the KHL.

On 3 September 2020, Serikov made his KHL debut for HC Spartak Moscow in an away game against Lokomotiv Yaroslavl. On 3 November 2020, he scored his first KHL goal against HC CSKA Moscow in an overtime win for Spartak. In the 2020–21 KHL season, he recorded three goals and two assists in 41 appearances for Spartak.

On 9 August 2021, the Chicago Wolves of the AHL, the affiliate of the Carolina Hurricanes, signed Serikov to a one-year contract for the 2021–22 AHL season.

On 12 June 2022, Serikov returned to former club, HC Spartak Moscow of the KHL, signing a two-year contract. In the 2022–23 season, Serikov spilt the season between Spartak Moscow and VHL affiliate, Khimik Voskresensk. He made 31 appearances in the KHL, posting new career high of 6 points.

In the off-season on 2 May 2023, Serikov was traded by Spartak, along with Dmitri Zlodeyev, to HC Neftekhimik Nizhnekamsk in exchange for Pavel Poryadin. He was immediately signed to a new two-year contract to remain with Nizhnekamsk.

== Personal life ==
Serikov plays football in his spare time. His ice hockey idol is Dmitry Orlov, a defenceman for the Carolina Hurricanes.

== Career statistics ==
			Regular season					Playoffs
Season	Team	League	GP	G	A	Pts	PIM	GP	G	A	Pts	PIM
2017–18	Kapitan Stupino	MHL	58	0	2	2	38	—	—	—	—	—
2018–19	Krylya Sovetov Moscow	MHL	62	5	12	17	42	—	—	—	—	—
2019–20	ORG Junior Beijing	MHL	27	3	8	11	18	—	—	—	—	—
2019–20	MHK Spartak Moscow	MHL	38	1	10	11	24	4	0	0	0	0
2020–21	Spartak Moscow	KHL	41	3	2	5	20	—	—	—	—	—
2020–21	Khimik Voskresensk	VHL	1	0	0	0	2	—	—	—	—	—
2020–21	MHK Spartak Moscow	MHL	13	2	5	7	6	4	1	0	1	4
2021–22	Chicago Wolves	AHL	42	2	6	8	18	—	—	—	—	—
2021–22	Norfolk Admirals	ECHL	4	0	0	0	0	—	—	—	—	—
2022–23	Spartak Moscow	KHL	31	1	5	6	16	—	—	—	—	—
2022–23	Khimik Voskresensk	VHL	15	1	6	7	18	21	5	4	9	10
2023–24	Neftekhimik Nizhnekamsk	KHL	68	4	16	20	30	—	—	—	—	—
2024–25	Neftekhimik Nizhnekamsk	KHL	57	1	19	20	12	—	—	—	—	—
2025–26	Neftekhimik Nizhnekamsk	KHL	67	5	17	22	22	5	0	3	3	2
KHL totals			264	14	59	73	100	5	0	3	3	2
