= Sharonov (surname) =

Sharonov, feminine: Sharonova (Russian: Шаро́нов, Шаро́нова) is a Russian surname that may refer to:

- Aleksandr Sharonov (born 1942) Mordvin (Russian) philologist, writer
- Nikolai Sharonov (1901-?), Soviet diplomat
- Roman Sharonov (born 1976), Russian footballer
- Vsevolod Sharonov (1901–1964), a Russian astronomer
- Yevgeny Sharonov (born 1958), a Russian water polo player
