= 5th Fighter Aviation Regiment =

Fighter regiment in World War II

- 5-й истребительный авиационный полк
- Founded: September 7, 1938
- Disbanded: May 5, 1947
- Country: Soviet Union
- Branch: Soviet Air Forces
- Type: Fighter aviation regiment
- Garrison/HQ: Kamen-Rybolov, Primorsky Krai
- Engagements: Soviet–Japanese War; Soviet invasion of Manchuria; Harbin–Kirin Operation
- Sorties: 102

The 5th Fighter Aviation Regiment (Russian: 5-й истребительный авиационный полк) was a fighter regiment of the Soviet Air Forces (Военно-воздушные силы) which took part in the Soviet–Japanese War.

== History ==
The regiment was formed on September 7, 1938, in the Siberian Military District. On May 31, 1939, the regiment was transferred to cover the 1st Red Banner Army until June 15, 1939.

On June 22, 1941, the regiment, located at Sukhaya Rechka, was part of 32nd Mixed Aviation Division (or 33rd? ru:33-я смешанная авиационная дивизия), earmarked to support 1st Red Banner Army, alongside two other fighter regiments and a bomber regiment.

From August 1942, the regiment formed part of the 249th Fighter Aviation Division.

On August 9, with the Soviet entry into the Pacific War, the 5th Fighter Aviation Regiment was moved to the front and flew sorties until September 3rd, 1945.

The regiment was disbanded on either April 1, 1947, or May 5, 1947 as part of the 190th Fighter Aviation Division at the Kamen-Rybolov airfield.

=== Commanders ===
List of commanders for the entire duration of the regiment:

- Colonel Lisin Vasilsi Timofeevich (1938)
- Lieutenant colonel Manaseyev Dmitry Ivanovich (December 2, 1942 – December 31, 1945)

=== Aircraft operated ===
Aircraft used by the 5th Fighter Aviation Regiment
From	To	Aircraft	Variant
1938	1944	Polikarpov I-15	I-15bis
1939	1944	Polikarpov I-16	
1944	1945	Yakovlev Yak-7	Yak-7B
1945	1947	Yakovlev Yak-3	

== See also ==
Strategic operations of the Red Army in World War II
