= Laerte do Vando =

Brazilian politician (born 1992)

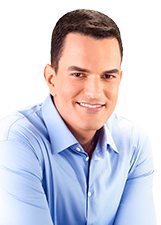

Member of the Legislative Assembly of Bahia
- Incumbent
- Assumed office 1 February 2019

Personal details
- Born: 23 May 1992 (age 33)
- Party: Avante (since 2026)
- Other political affiliations: Podemos (2023-2026)
- Parent: Vando (father)

Laerte Leandro de Araújo Fernandes (born 23 May 1992), better known as Laerte do Vando, is a Brazilian politician serving as a member of the Legislative Assembly of Bahia since 2019. He is the son of Vando.
