= Kamen-Rybolov =

Rural locality in Primorsky Krai, Russia

Coordinates: 44°46′N 132°01′E

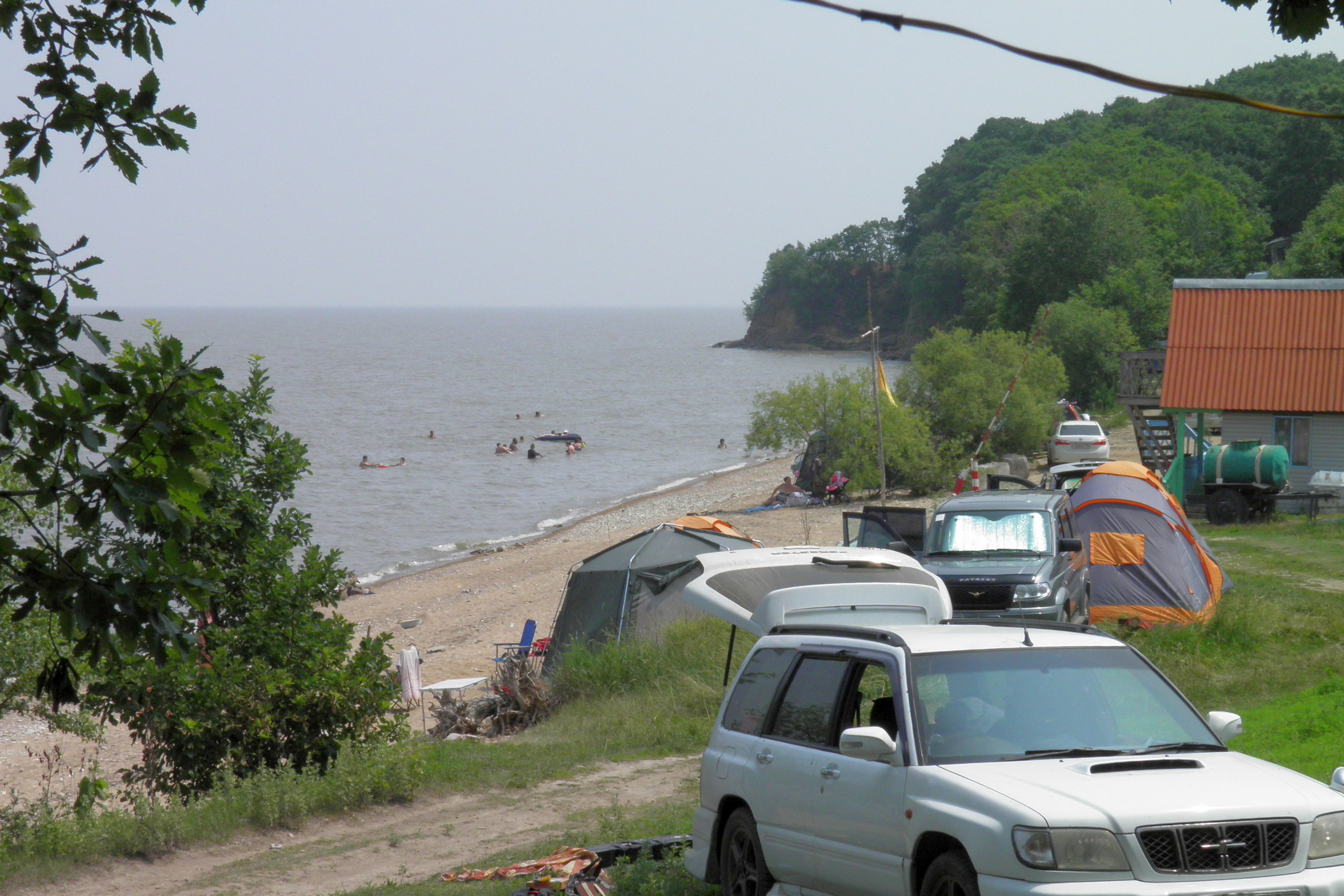
A recreation center near the village of Kamen-Rybolov on Lake Khanka.

Kamen-Rybolov (Russian: Ка́мень-Рыболо́в) is a rural locality (a selo) and the administrative center of Khankaysky District of Primorsky Krai, Russia, located on the shores of Lake Khanka. Population: 10,909 (2010 census); 11,769 (2002 census); 8,569 (1989 Soviet census).

== History ==
It was founded by peasants who migrated from the western regions of Russia (modern day Belarus) and by the Cossacks in 1865.
