= Pavel Klushantsev =

Soviet film director (1910–1999)

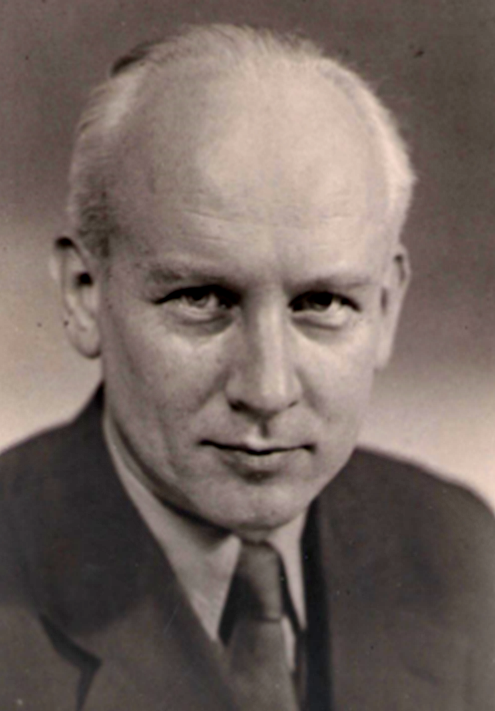
- 1965
- Born: Pavel Vladimirovich Klushantsev; 25 February 1910; Saint Petersburg, Russian Empire
- Died: 27 April 1999 (aged 89); Saint Petersburg, Russia
- Education: Leningrad Fototechnikum
- Occupations: Filmmaker; cinematographer; writer
- Years active: 1930–1981

Pavel Vladimirovich Klushantsev (Russian: Па́вел Влади́мирович Клуша́нцев; 25 February 1910 – 27 April 1999) was a Russian cameraman of higher category (1939), film director, producer, screenwriter and author who worked during the Soviet Era. He was a Meritorious Artist of Russia (1970).

== Biography ==
Pavel Klushantsev was born in Saint Petersburg into a Russian family. His mother was a housewife of noble heritage. After the October Revolution she worked as a teacher in a boarding school. During the 1930s her elder brother, a former White officer, was arrested under the suspicion of Sergey Kirov's murder and sent to prison camps. She died of starvation during the Leningrad Blockade. Pavel's father came from a small town of Staritsa in the Tver Oblast. He spent many years working as a zemstvo doctor following his graduation from the medical academy in Saint Petersburg. He was later appointed to work in the Ministry of Commerce and Industry of the Russian Empire and was granted a personal nobility. After the revolution he spent some years selling tickets on a railway station. He died in 1919.

Klushantsev graduated from the Leningrad Fototechnikum in 1930 and worked for Belgoskino as a cinematographer for four years. In 1934, he began working at Lenfilm / Lennauchfilm, where he became a director and producer, primarily making science educational films including his visionary film – Road to the Stars (1957). Prior to this film, Klushantsev's films were strictly factual, but here, the film builds on fact and extends it. The film becomes a hybrid documentary blending science with fiction edging firmly into science fiction. This film's special effects – the scientific accuracy of depicting weightlessness, construction in Earth orbit, a rotating space station, and rocket travel to the Moon – were cutting-edge visual effects of their time.

Planet of the Storms (Planeta Bur), Klushantsev's only feature film, was released in 1962. For this film, Klushantsev is especially noted for his meticulous design and creation of "John the Robot". Based on Chester E. Macduffee's 1911 heavy Cast-Aluminium Diving Suit, it had over 42 points of articulation on its major body joints – one of the most technically complex robot costumes of its time. The film was subsequently re-edited and expanded by Roger Corman for American distribution – as Voyage to the Prehistoric Planet (1965) by Curtis Harrington and as Voyage to the Planet of Prehistoric Women (1968) by Peter Bogdanovich. In both these versions, the original scenes drew acclaim.

Subsequent to Planet of the Storms, Klushantsev fell into disfavor in USSR and returned to making more science-based films. In 1972, his services were terminated.

He was a well-known author of popular scientific juvenile books.

Pavel Klushantsev spent his later years in his flat in Saint Petersburg. In an interview, he criticized the post-Soviet Russia for the absence of culture and television — for the lack of interest in educational films, in raising polymaths.

Klushantsev died in 1999 at the age of 89. He was buried at the Smolensky Cemetery. He was survived by his wife, animator Nadezda Alexandrovna Klushantseva (1912-2000), and his two children: Zhanna Klushantseva (born 1936) and Mikhail Klushansev (born 1945).

Pavel Klushantsev's works are featured among Russian Fantastika.

An English language documentary on Pavel Klushantsev's life and achievements, The Star Dreamer, was released in 2002 by Danish Vesterholt Film and TV.

== Filmography ==
- 1935. Seven Barriers (Семь барьеров)
- 1937. Intrepidity (Неустрашимые)
- 1946. Northern Lights (Полярное сияние)
- 1947. Meteorites / (Метеориты) (10 minutes)
- 1951. The Universe / Kosmos (Вселенная / Vselennaya)
- 1956. The Secret of a Substance (Тайна вещества / Taina Veshestva) (50 minutes)
- 1957. The Road to the Stars (Дорога к звёздам / Doroga k Zvezdam) (58 minutes)
- 1962. Planet of the Storms (Планета бурь / Planeta Bur) (78 minutes)
- 1965. Moon (Луна / Luna)
- 1968. Mars (Марс)
- 1970. I See the Earth! (Вижу Землю!) (16 minutes)
- 1972. A Dictate of Time (Веление времени)

== Awards ==
- 1952. Universe: Karlovy Vary International Film Festival (KVIFF VII). Diploma IV, International Film Festival, Paris.
- 1958. Road to the Stars: All-Union Film Festival (VKF I), Moscow. International Cinema Festival (ICF) Technical and Scientific Films, Belgrade.
- 1966. Moon: Gold Seal, Trieste IV ICF Fantastic Movies.
- 1970. Merited Artist of Russia.

== Bibliography ==
- Lynn Barker & Robert Skotak: Klushantsev: Russia's Wizard of Fantastika (pt. 1). American Cinematographer, Vol. 75, No. 6, June 1994, pgs 78-83.
- Lynn Barker & Robert Skotak: Klushantsev: Russia's Wizard of Fantastika (pt. 2). American Cinematographer, Vol. 75, No. 7, July 1994, pgs 77-82.
- Evgeni Kharitonov & Andrei Shcherbak-Zhukov. Na ekrane-Chudo: Otechestvennaya kinofantastika i kinoskazka [The Wonder on the Screen: National Fantastic, SF, and Fairy Tale Films]. Moscow: NII Kinoiskusstva, V. Sekachev, 2003.
- Pavel Klushantsev: All About the Telescope, 1962, reprinted in 1972, 1975 and 1980 on Russian, English, Spanish and Polish languages.
- Pavel Klushantsev: Answer, Martians!, 1968, reprinted in the USSR 1976.
- Pavel Klushantsev: Are We Lonely In Universe?, 1981, reprinted in Greece 1984.
- Pavel Klushantsev: House on an Orbit, 1975, reprinted in Czechoslovakia 1975.
- Pavel Klushantsev: K Drugim Planetam! [To Other Planets], 1959, reprinted in the USSR 1962, in Poland 1964, in Japan 1972.
- Pavel Klushantsev: Stantsiia "Luna" [Station "Moon"], 1965, reprinted in Japan 1972, in the USSR 1974.
- Lars Movin: Road to the Stars [New Release / The Star Dreamer]. Film [Danish Film Institute] #25, November 2002, pgs 6-7.

== See also ==
- Cinema of the Soviet Union
- Science fiction cinema
