= Mikhail Alekseev (linguist) =

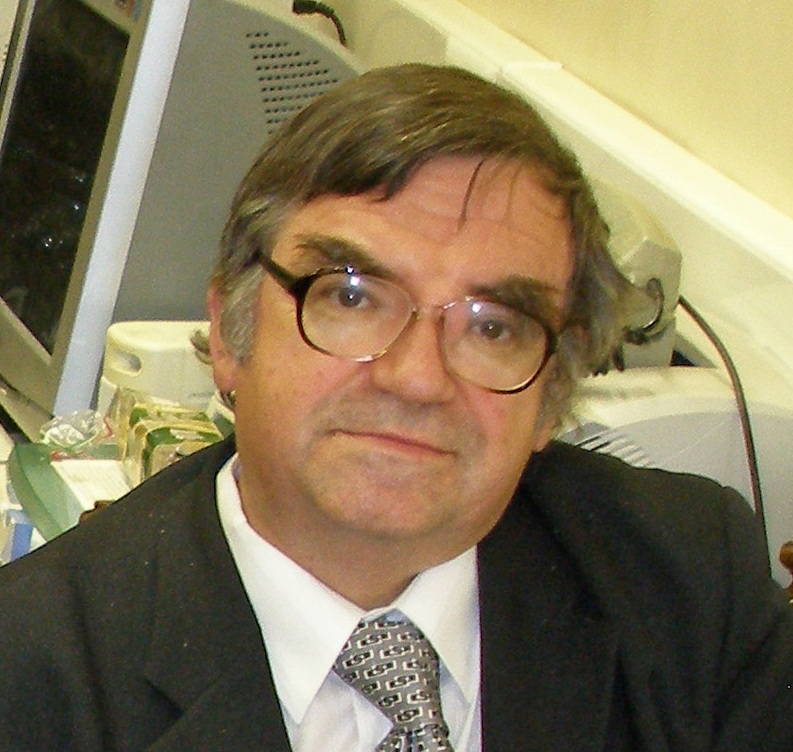
- Mikhail Alekseev in 2009
- Born: Mikhail Egorovich Alekseev; 24 October 1949; Mytishchi
- Died: 23 May 2014 (aged 64); Ufa
- Education: Moscow State University
- Known for: work in Nakh-Daghestanian languages
- Scientific career
- Fields: linguistics
- Workplaces: Institute of Linguistics
- Doctoral advisor: Georgy Klimov

Mikhail Egorovich Alekseev (Russian: Михаи́л Его́рович Алексе́ев) (24 October 1949, in Mytishchi – 23 May 2014, in Ufa) was a Soviet and Russian linguist specializing in Nakh-Daghestanian languages.

== Career ==
Alekseev was the vice-director of the Institute of Linguistics of the Russian Academy of Sciences, and the head of its section on Caucasian languages.

He studied linguistics at Moscow State University with Aleksandr E. Kibrik, taking part in several field trips to Pamir and Daghestanian languages. He defended his dissertation in 1975, supervised by Georgiy A. Klimov, on "The problem of the affective/experiential sentence construction".

Alekseev's later contributions mostly concerned the historical-comparative study of Daghestanian languages. He was a close colleague and collaborator of Sergei A. Starostin.
