= Georgy Klimov =

Russian linguist

Georgy Klimov (Russian: Гео́ргий Андре́евич Кли́мов, Georgiy Andreyevich Klimov) (September 23, 1928 – April 29, 1997) was a Russian linguist and a leading specialist of the Caucasian languages. His interest focused primarily on the Kartvelian linguistics but also encompassed the Burushaski language and the Amerind language group.

== Biography ==
Born in Leningrad, Klimov graduated from the Leningrad State University in 1952. From 1954 onward, he worked for the Institute of Linguistics of the Soviet Academy of Sciences, becoming a professor there in 1988. He died in Moscow in 1997, leaving behind over 360 scholarly works and many projects uncompleted. An important work in the field of comparative linguistics of Kartvelian languages, Etymological Dictionary of the Kartvelian Languages, was published in 1998.
