= No. 36 Squadron (Finland) =

No. 36 Squadron Finnish Air Force
- Country: Finland
- Branch: Finnish Air Force
- Role: Maritime reconnaissance
- Engagements: Winter War

No. 36 Squadron (Finnish: Lentolaivue 36 or LLv.36) was a maritime reconnaissance squadron of the Finnish Air Force (subordinated by the Finnish Navy headquarters) during World War II. The unit was later reorganized into the No. 39 Squadron.

== Organization ==
=== Winter War ===
- 1st Flight (1. Lentue)
- 2nd Flight (2. Lentue)
- 3rd Flight (3. Lentue)
- 1st Flight of No. 39 Squadron (1./T-LLv.39)

The Squadron was equipped with 6 Blackburn Ripon IIFs, 2 Koolhoven F.K.52s, 1 Ilyushin DB-3M, 3 Junkers F 13fes, and one Waco YKS-7.
