= Stanislav Pozhlakov =

Russian composer (1937–2003)

Stanislav Pozhlakov Станисла́в Пожлако́в
- Born: Станисла́в Ива́нович Пожлако́в (Stanislav Ivanovich Pozhlakov); 4 January 1937; Mytischi, Moscow Oblast, Russian SFSR, Soviet Union
- Died: 26 September 2003 (aged 66); Saint Petersburg, Russia
- Occupation(s): Musician, composer, performer
- Awards: Honored Art Worker of Russia

Stanislav Ivanovich Pozhlakov (Russian: Станисла́в Ива́нович Пожлако́в; 4 January 1937 – 26 September 2003) was a Russian jazz musician, composer and performer. He was a member of the Saint Petersburg Union of Composers and received the title of Honored Art Worker of Russia.

His songs were extremely popular and included in repertoire of Soviet music leading singers, such as Edita Piekha, Eduard Khil, Lyudmila Senchina, Muslim Magomayev, Maya Kristalinskaya, Aida Vedishcheva, Galina Nenasheva, Maria Pakhomenko, Tamara Miansarova, Larisa Mondrus and many others. He often performed his songs by himself.
