= Mikhail Alekseyev (banker) =

Russian banker (born 1964)

Deputy Chairman of the Central Bank of Russia
- Incumbent
- Assumed office 12 October 2020

Personal details
- Born: January 4, 1964 (age 62) Moscow, Soviet Union
- Occupation: banker

External image
- Mikhail Yu. Alekseev

Mikhail Yurievich Alekseyev (also Alexeev; in Russian: Михаил Юрьевич Алексеев; born January 4, 1964) is a Russian banker, Deputy Chairman of the Central Bank of Russia.

== Early life ==
In 1986, he graduated from the Finance and Credit Faculty of the Moscow Financial Institute. From 1986 to 1989 he attended graduate school at the university. As a third year student, he was awarded the bronze medal of All-Soviet Exhibition Centre for his scientific work. He has a Ph.D. in Economics. He is the author of five monographs focused on securities market issues, the first of which, published in 1993, became the first mass-published textbook in Russian on securities market.

== Career ==
In 1989, he began his career as an economist for the Ministry of Finance of the USSR. In 1991, He became deputy head of the Main Directorate for Improving the Finance and Credit Mechanism of the Ministry of Finance in 1991. The same year, he took part in special courses organized by U.S. Securities and Exchange Commission for heads of financial regulatory authorities of countries with developing financial markets. In 1992, he was promoted to the management board of Moscow's Mezhkombank.

He moved to the position of the Deputy Chairman of the management board of UNEXIM Bank in 1995. From 1999 to 2006, he held the positions of senior vice-president and deputy chairman of the management board of Rosbank, and from 2006 to 2008 he served as president and chairman of the board of Rosprombank. Since July 2008 he serves as chairman of the management board at UniCredit Bank and is responsible for general management of the bank's operations. Since 12 October 2020 he is Deputy Chairman of the Central Bank of Russia. Since 20 May 2009 he is a member of the advisory board of the Association of Banks of Russia, Member of the management board of the Russian Union of Industrialists and Entrepreneurs since 11 November 2009.

== Honors and awards ==
- Medal of the Order "For Merit to the Fatherland", Second class, (17 July 2019)
- Order of the Star of Italy (Italian: Ordine della Stella d'Italia nel grado di Cavaliere, May 13, 2016).

== Family ==
He is married with two sons.

He is fond of photography, has been a member of the Moscow Union of Artists since 2011, published several author's photo albums, participated in exhibitions.

== Bibliography ==
- Alekseev M. Yu., Pachkalov A. V. Ministers of Finance: From the Russian Empire to the Present. - Moscow, Alpina Publisher, 2019. - 554 p. - ISBN 978-5-9614-2182-8
