= Mytishchi =

City in Moscow Oblast, Russia

Mytishchi Мытищи
- Town
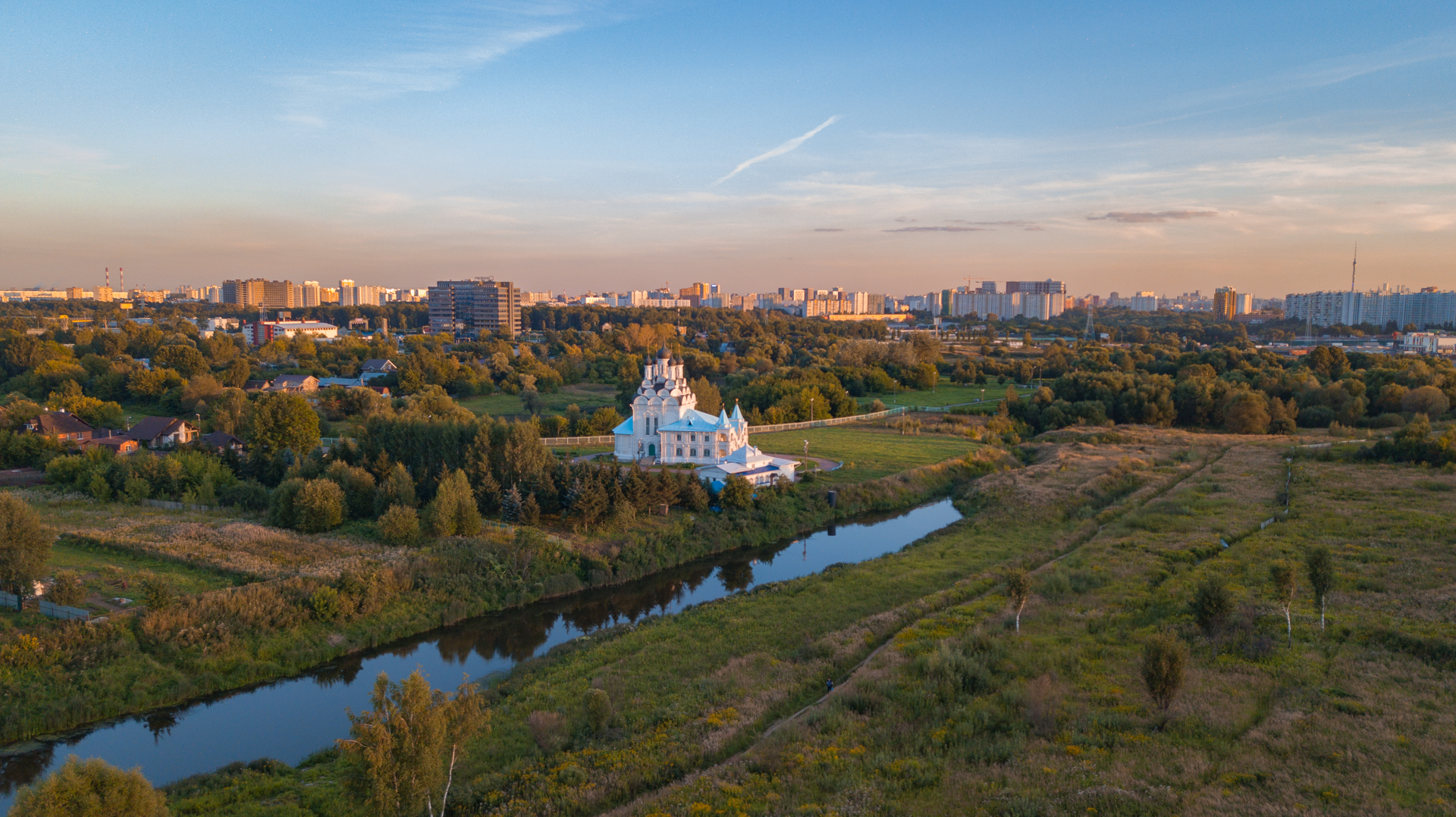
- Annunciation Church in Mytishchi

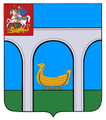
- Flag Coat of arms
- Interactive map of Mytishchi
- Location of Mytishchi Mytishchi (Moscow Oblast)
- Coordinates: 55°55′N 37°46′E
- Country: Russia
- Federal subject: Moscow Oblast
- Administrative district: Mytishchinsky District
- CitySelsoviet: Mytishchi
- Known since: 1460
- Town status since: 1925

Government
  - Body: Council of Deputies
  - Head: Yulia Kupetskaya
- Elevation: 150 m (490 ft)

Population (2010 Census)
  - Total: 173,160
  - Estimate (2025): 278,693 (+60.9%)
  - Rank: 105th in 2010

Administrative status
  - Capital of: Mytishchinsky District, Town of Mytishchi

Municipal status
  - Municipal district: Mytishchinsky Municipal District
  - Urban settlement: Mytishchi Urban Settlement
  - Capital of: Mytishchinsky Municipal District, Mytishchi Urban Settlement
- Time zone: UTC+3 (MSK)
- Postal codes: 141000–141002, 141004–141011, 141013–141018, 141020, 141021, 141023–141029, 141037–141043, 141045–141050, 141053, 141056–141059, 141101–141132, 141941–141945, 994003–994005
- Dialing code: +7 495
- OKTMO ID: 46746000001
- Town Day: One of the Sundays in September
- Website: www.mytischi-city.ru

Mytishchi (Russian: Мыти́щи, IPA: [mɨˈtʲiɕːɪ]) is a city and the administrative center of Mytishchinsky District in Moscow Oblast, Russia, which lies 19 km northeast of Russia's capital Moscow on the Yauza River and the Moscow–Yaroslavl railway. The city was an important waypoint for traders on the Yauza River, the Yaroslavl Highway passes through the city. Mytishchi is famous for its aqueduct, built in 1804, the first water supply pipeline to supply the growing population of Moscow. The city has a population of approximately 262,702 people as of 2022.

== Geography ==
The city is located 19 km northeast of Russia's capital Moscow on the Yauza River and the Moscow–Yaroslavl railway.

=== Climate ===
Mytishchi has a humid continental climate, which is the same as Moscow but usually a few degrees colder due to significantly lesser impact of urban heat island. The city features long, cold winters (with temperatures as low as −25 °C (−13 °F) to −30 °C (−22 °F) occurring every winter and a record low of −43 °C (−45 °F)), and short, warm-hot summers (with a record high of 38 °C (100 °F) and temperatures reaching 30 °C (86 °F) every summer). For example, the January daily mean is −10 °C (14 °F), with the average maximum of −7 °C (19 °F) and average minimum of −13 °C (9 °F). July's daily mean temperature, on the other hand, is 19 °C (66 °F), with its average maximum being 24 °C (75 °F) and its average minimum being 14 °C (57 °F).

Climate data for Mytishchi
Month	Jan	Feb	Mar	Apr	May	Jun	Jul	Aug	Sep	Oct	Nov	Dec	Year
Mean daily maximum °C (°F)	−7 (19)	−6 (21)	1.0 (33.8)	11.0 (51.8)	18.0 (64.4)	21.0 (69.8)	24.0 (75.2)	20.0 (68.0)	15.0 (59.0)	7.0 (44.6)	0.0 (32.0)	−5 (23)	8.3 (46.8)
Daily mean °C (°F)	−10 (14)	−9 (16)	−4 (25)	6.0 (42.8)	13.0 (55.4)	17.0 (62.6)	19.0 (66.2)	16.0 (60.8)	11.0 (51.8)	4.0 (39.2)	−2 (28)	−8 (18)	4.4 (40.0)
Mean daily minimum °C (°F)	−13 (9)	−12 (10)	−9 (16)	1.0 (33.8)	8.0 (46.4)	13.0 (55.4)	14.0 (57.2)	12.0 (53.6)	7.0 (44.6)	1.0 (33.8)	−4 (25)	−11 (12)	0.6 (33.1)
Source: Climate and ecology of Mytishchi

== History ==
The first settlement of ancient hunters and fishermen in this location dates back to the 6th–8th millennia BCE, i.e., in the late Stone Age. In the 8th–9th centuries, first Slavic tribes (Vyatichi and Krivichs) began settling here. In and around Mytishchinsky District about a dozen of such settlements from the 11th–13th centuries have been discovered.

The modern settlement has been known as the village Mystiche since 1460, and Bolshiye Mytishchi (Большие Мытищи) since the 19th century. The name comes from the so-called mytnaya (or "myta") duty that was levied on merchants hauling ships (by wheels, rollers or skids) between the Yauza and Klyazma Rivers, collected at the place now known as Yauza mytishche. The word "Mytische" is a portmanteau of myt (мыта) and a place where there was a residential building with a kiln and a hearth.

In 1804, the Mytishchi-Moscow aqueduct was built by order of Catherine the Great. It was the first water supply constructed in Russia to provide the Kremlin with pure water.

The first enterprises were organized in Mytischi in the middle of the 19th Century. Mytischi station, on the Moscow-Yaroslavl railway, opened in 1861, SI Mamontov's car building plant opened in 1896, and Viskova, Russia's first artificial silk company, began work in 1908. Mytischi and its district became a popular summer retreat for Russian holidaymakers from the late 19th and early 20th centuries, .

Mytischi gained city status on August 17, 1925.

In 1932, the territory of the city was significantly expanded, according to the decree of the Presidium of the Moscow Regional Executive Committee No. 8 (minutes No. 56) of October 4, 1932 and the decree of the Presidium of the All-Russian Central Executive Committee of November 20, 1932 that approved it. The settlement merged with the villages of Bolshie Mytishchi, Rupasovo, Sharapovo, Zarechnaya Sloboda, Leonidovka, Perlovka, Taininsky settlements, Druzhba and Taininka.

== Population ==
Population of Mytishchi
Year	Population
1852	389
1859	435
1897	1000
1899	1026
1917	7000
1926	17000
1931	23100
1939	60118
1959	98606
1962	107000
1964	111000
1967	112000
1970	118653
1973	125000
1975	134000
1976	134000
1979	140656
1982	148000
1985	151000
1986	150000
1987	152000
1989	154068
1990	154000
1991	154000
1992	154000
1993	153000
1994	152000
1995	153000
1996	153000
1997	153000
1998	155000
1999	155700
2000	155700
2001	157000
2002	159900
2003	159900
2004	161400
2005	161500
2006	161800
2007	162700
2008	163400
2009	164299
2010	173160
2011	173300
2012	174971
2013	178672
2014	183224
2015	187119
2016	201130
2017	205397
2018	211606
2019	222739
2020	235504
2021	245643
2022	262702

According to Wikidata, the population of Mytishchi was 389 (1852), 435 (1859), 1,000 (1897), 1,026 (1899), 7,000 (1917), 17,000 (1926), 23,100 (1931), 60,118 (1939), 98,606 (1959), 107,000 (1962), 111,000 (1964), 112,000 (1967), 118,653 (1970), 125,000 (1973), 134,000 (1975), 134,000 (1976), 140,656 (1979), 148,000 (1982), 151,000 (1985), 150,000 (1986), 152,000 (1987), 154,068 (1989), 154,000 (1990), 154,000 (1991), 154,000 (1992), 153,000 (1993), 152,000 (1994), 153,000 (1995), 153,000 (1996), 153,000 (1997), 155,000 (1998), 155,700 (1999), 155,700 (2000), 157,000 (2001), 159,900 (2002), 159,900 (2003), 161,400 (2004), 161,500 (2005), 161,800 (2006), 162,700 (2007), 163,400 (2008), 164,299 (2009), 173,160 (2010), 173,300 (2011), 174,971 (2012), 178,672 (2013), 183,224 (2014), 187,119 (2015), 201,130 (2016), 205,397 (2017), 211,606 (2018), 222,739 (2019), 235,504 (2020), 255,429 (2021), 266,436 (2023), 275,313 (2024), 278,693 (2025). Mytishchi is the fourth largest city in Moscow Oblast after Balashikha (278,693 (population est, 2025)), Podolsk (313,414 (population est, 2025)), Khimki (259,399 (population est, 2025)) in terms of population.

== Administrative and municipal status ==
Within the framework of administrative divisions, Mytishchi serves as the administrative center of Mytishchinsky District. As an administrative division, it is, together with twenty-four rural localities, incorporated within Mytishchinsky District as the Town of Mytishchi. As a municipal division, the Town of Mytishchi is incorporated within Mytishchinsky Municipal District as Mytishchi Urban Settlement.

== Economy ==
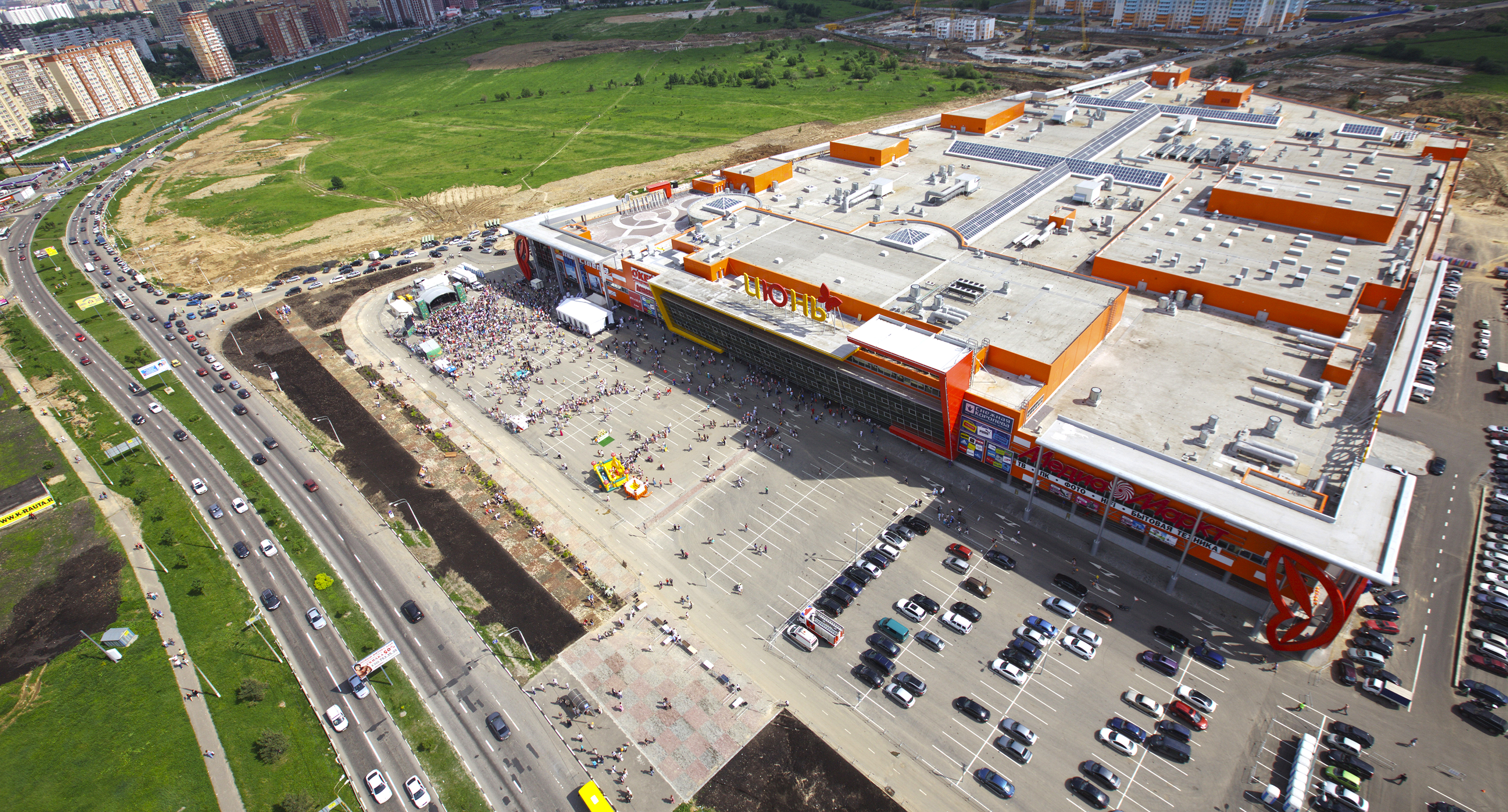
Shopping mall "June"

The city is the oblast's largest center for industry (machine building, arms industry in particular) and education. The Mytishchi Machine-Building Plant and Metrovagonmash (a manufacturer of train cars) are two large employers.

== Architecture ==
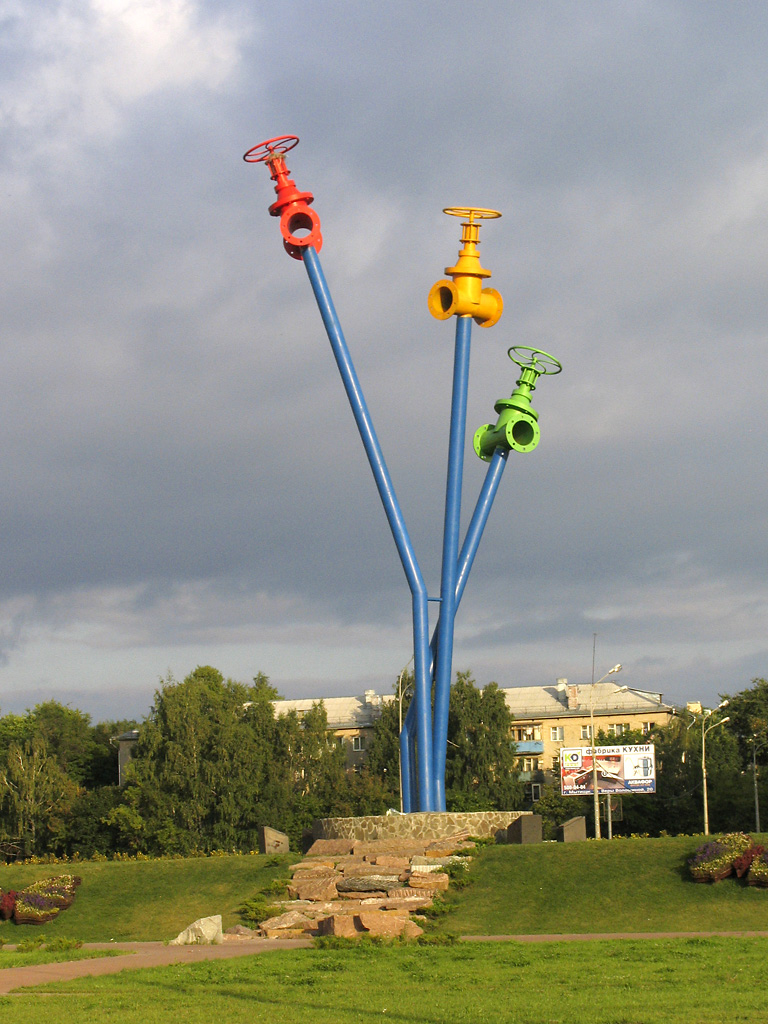
Monument to the first Russian water supply system

=== Cultural heritage sites ===
The city has a number of cultural heritage sites

- Settlement "Mytishchi-1" (a monument of archeology of the XV-XVIII centuries) - Yaroslavl highway, 60–88, 61–91.
- The complex of buildings of the Mytishchi car-building plant (part of the Metrovagonmash plant (MMZ)) (late 19th - early 20th century).
- Two dachas in the dacha village of Perlovka : a wooden dacha of the Ageev merchants (architectural monument, 1900s) - Pionerskaya st., 10.
- The Mytishchi pumping station (part of Catherine the Great's Mytishchi water pipeline) in the Losiny Ostrov National Park.
- Church of the Vladimir Icon of the Mother of God (architectural monument, 1713) - Yaroslavskoe shosse, 93.
- Church of the Annunciation in Taininsky (architectural monument, 1675–1677).
- Church of the Don Icon of the Mother of God in Perlovka.

In 2005, the Church of the Nativity of Christ was built in the city center. On the central square, there are 4 lanterns of the late 1950s, presumably the project of M. A. Minkus. Identical lights were installed at the lobby of the Kropotkinskaya metro station (Prechistenka St.) and at the Nikulin Moscow Circus on Tsvetnoy Boulevard.

=== Monuments ===
- Monuments to Vladimir Lenin
- Monument "Bayonet" in honor of the victory in the Great Patriotic War
- Memorial of the Great Patriotic War
- Monument to the partisan V. D. Voloshina
- Monument to the pilots of the Mytishchi flying club (an exact copy of the U-2 [Po-2] aircraft). Artist-architect Valery Androsov
- Monument to the Hero of the Soviet Union pilot N. M. Raspopova
- Monument to cosmonaut G. M. Strekalov
- Monument to A. V. Suvorov
- SU-76M
- ZSU-23-4 "Shilka" (a monument to the designer N. A. Astrov, 1906–1992)
- Monument to V. M. Kolontsov (1888-1920), the commander of the Red Guard detachment, who died during the Civil War in battles with the White Guards, the central street of old Mytishchi, Kolontsova Street, is named after him
- Monument to D. M. Kedrin
- Monument to the Mytishchi water pipeline
- Monument to the ancient portage that existed on the site of the modern city (wooden sculpture "Ladya" near the Central Park of Culture and Culture of Mytishchi)
- Monument to the employees of the Mytishchi police, participants of the Great Patriotic War
- Monument to military signalmen
- Monument to the citizens of Mytishchi who died in the line of military and official duty and in local conflicts
- Sculpture "A cat without a tail" from the sister city of Gabrovo
- Monument to Olya Lukoya at the puppet theater "Ognivo"
- Monument to the Family, love and fidelity
- Monument to Nicholas II
- Monument to the subway car
- Monument to the samovar
- Monument to General Pyotr Deinekin at the Federal Military Memorial Cemetery. Opened in August 2018

== Twin towns – sister cities ==
Mytishchi is twinned with:

- Angarsk, Russia
- Baltiysk, Russia
- Bakhchysarai, Ukraine
- Baranovichi, Belarus
- Barysaw, Belarus
- Düren (district), Germany
- Gabrovo, Bulgaria
- Lecco, Italy
- Smalyavichy, Belarus
- Zhodzina, Belarus

Former twin towns:

- Panevėžys, Lithuania
- Płock, Poland

In March 2022, Panevėžys and Płock suspended their partnerships with Mytishchi as a response to the 2022 Russian invasion of Ukraine.

== Culture ==
=== Mass Media ===
There are three local TV channels: "Our Mytishchi" - the channel that belongs to the town, "The first Mytishchinsky", and "TV Mytishchi" (on the TV channel of Moscow region 360°) - district television.

=== Theatres ===
There is Ognivo puppet theatre, FEST drama and comedy theatre, and youth theater Domoy (Homewards).

== Notable people ==
People born in Mytishchi:

- Mikhail Egorovich Alekseev (1949–2014), linguist
- Yuri Bezmenov (1939–1993), journalist
- Ivan Dmitriyevich Borisov (1913–1939), pilot
- Yevgeny Dietrich (born 1973), politician
- Vadim Yevseyev (born 1976), football coach
- Anna Frolova (born 2005), figure skater
- Alexey Glyzin (born 1954), actor
- Tatyana Golikova (born 1966), politician
- Elizaveta Khudaiberdieva (born 2002), ice dancer
- Evgeny Kirillov (born 1987), tennis player
- Yelena Kondakova (born 1957), cosmonaut
- Pavel Maykov (born 1975), actor
- Dmitry Miller (born 1972), actor
- Svetlana Moskalets (born 1969), heptathlete
- Alexander Pichushkin (born 1974), serial killer
- Stanislav Pozhlakov (1937–2003), musician
- Mikhail Semichastny (1910–1978), football player
- Artyom Serikov (born 2000), ice hockey player
- Roman Sharonov (born 1976), football coach
- Gennady Strekalov (1940–2004), cosmonaut
- Aleksei Yeroshkin (born 1987), football player
