= Vsevolod Sharonov =

Russian astronomer

Vsevolod Sharonov (1901–1964) was a Russian and Soviet astronomer.

== Life ==
Sharonov was born on March 10, 1901, in Leningrad. He went on to graduate from Petrograd University in 1926 and soon after began work as teaching faculty at Leningrad State University. There he would eventually meet and marry fellow astronomer Nadezhda Sytinskaya. Sharonov died on November 26, 1964, also in St. Petersburg.

== Career ==
The bulk of Sharonov's work was done at Pulkovo Observatory just outside of Leningrad. During his tenure as professor of astronomy at Leningrad State University, Sharonov eventually became its director. His main focus in scientific research was the study of planets and atmospheric optics.

== Honors ==
The following celestial landmarks are named after him:

- Sharonov (Martian crater)
- Asteroid 2416 Sharonov
- Sharonov (lunar crater)

== Bibliography ==
He published over 300 research papers in his lifetime including the following

- The Nature of the Planets
- Measurement and Calculations of the Visibility of Distant Objects
- Mars
- The Sun and its Observation
