= Lennauchfilm =

Russian film studio

- Type: Corporation
- Industry: Motion pictures
- Founded: 1933
- Fate: Acquired by the Gorky Film Studio (2012)
- Headquarters: St. Petersburg, Russia
- Key people: Anton Smirnov (General Manager)
- Products: Motion pictures
- Website: http://www.lennauchfilm.ru

Lennauchfilm (acronym of Leningrad studio popular science and educational films) is a Soviet and Russian film studio founded in Leningrad.

The current Lennauchfilm studio is one of the largest in the Russian Federation.

Lennauchfilm is a full-cycle studio, working on films for theatrical, video and television rental. Documentary films created at Lennauchfilm cover such topics as the history of Russia, defense technology, architecture, religion, and customs of the multinational state. Topics of film series include the secrets of rare trades and crafts, popular science films about nature and travel, and biographical sketches.

The collection Lennauchfilm includes feature films, as well as animation (such as short films using a variety of techniques).

Products of Lennauchfilm have received awards in international film festivals.

== History ==
The name of the studio has undergone several changes.

- 1933–1936 – first founded under the name of Film Studio #1 "Texfilm"
- 1936–1942 – it was called Leningrad Film Studio for Scientific and Technical Training Films "Lentexfilm"
- in 1938, the "Film Studio" part of the name was shortened to "Studio"
- 1942–1944 – it was called Leningrad Joint Studio for Scientific, Technical and Documentary Films
- 1944–1946 – it was called "Lentexfilm"
- 1946–1996 – it was called Leningrad studio of popular science films
- 1996–2004 – it was called St. Petersburg studio of popular science films
- 2004–2006 – it was reformed as a federal state unitary enterprise creative-production association St. Petersburg studio of popular movies
- 2006–2012 – it was called OAO Kinostudio "Lennauchfilm"
- 2012–present – after the reorganization and merger with JSC Gorky Film Studio (also known as Central Film Studio), it is now called Branch "Lennauchfilm" of JSC "CNF".

During the siege of Leningrad, the studio continued to work, in Leningrad, to provide newsreels delivered immediately to theaters, as well as to the front lines.

Over the years, such documentary cinematographers as Pavel Klushantsev and others worked at the studio.
