= Bride of the Monster =

1955 American science fiction horror film by Ed Wood

- Original theatrical poster
- Directed by: Ed Wood
- Written by: Alex Gordon; Ed Wood
- Produced by: Ed Wood; Donald McCoy; Samuel Z. Arkoff; Lyman C. Abbott; Don Nagel
- Starring: Bela Lugosi; Tor Johnson; Tony McCoy; Loretta King
- Cinematography: Ted Allan; William C. Thompson
- Edited by: Warren Adams
- Music by: Frank Worth
- Production company: Rolling M. Productions
- Distributed by: Banner Pictures
- Release date: May 11, 1955
- Running time: 68 minutes
- Country: United States
- Language: English
- Budget: $70,000

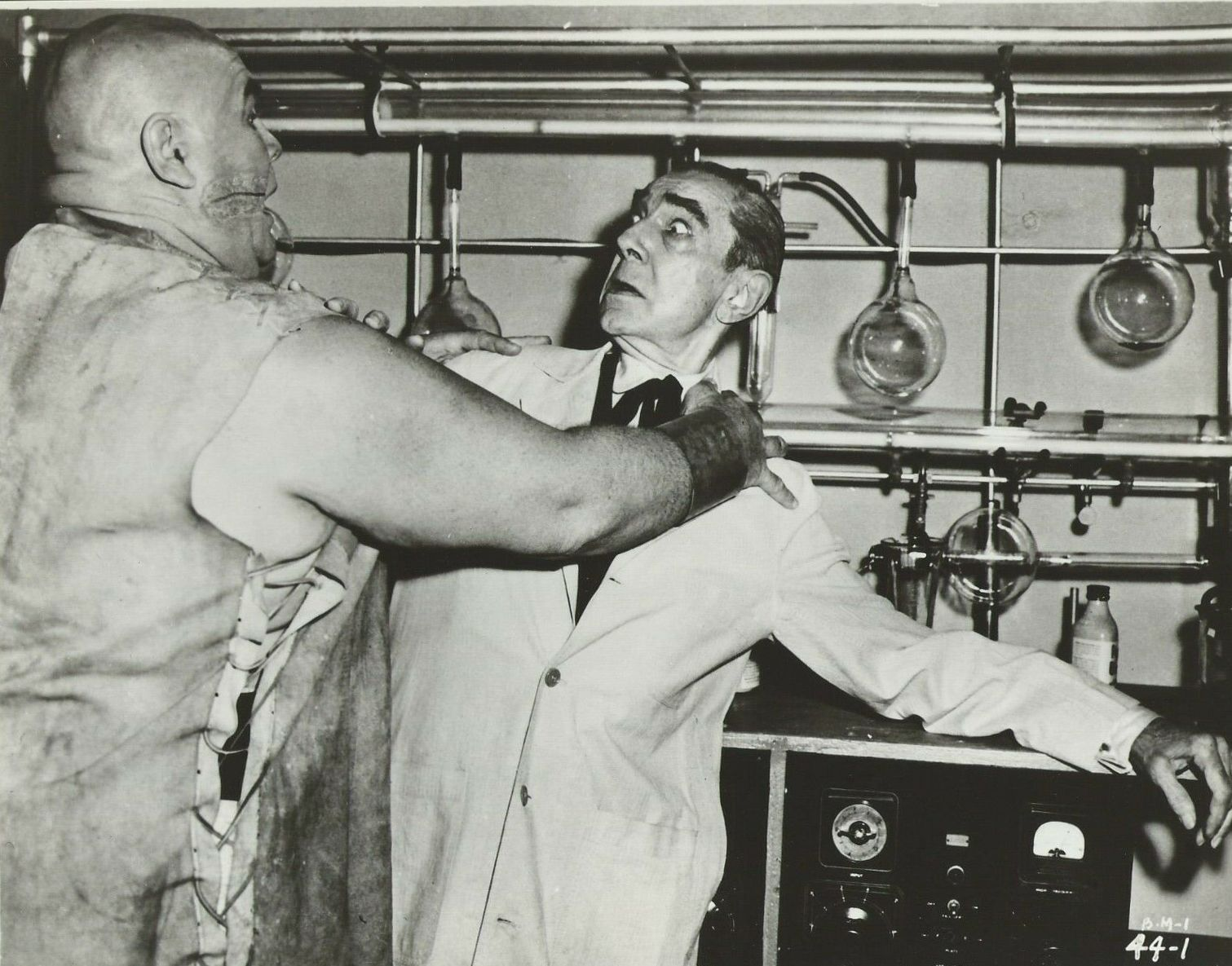
Tor Johnson and Bela Lugosi in Bride of the Monster (1955)

Bride of the Monster is a 1955 American independent science fiction horror film co-written, produced, and directed by Edward D. Wood Jr. The story follows Dr. Erich Vornoff (portrayed by Bela Lugosi in his final speaking role), a fugitive scientist conducting experiments with atomic radiation to create enhanced supermen at a secluded island laboratory. Supporting roles include Tor Johnson as Vornoff's mute assistant Lobo, Tony McCoy as investigative reporter Dick Craig, and Loretta King as Craig's fiancée Janet Lawton.

The film is considered to have Wood's biggest budget at $70,000. Production commenced in 1954 but, due to funding shortages, was not completed until 1955. It was released in May 1955 under the original title Bride of the Atom, initially on a double bill with Macumba. In February 1956, it played (retitled Bride of the Monster) at drive-ins on a double feature with The Beast with a Million Eyes.

== Plot ==
In a stretch of woods, two hunters are caught in a thunderstorm. They decide to seek refuge in Willows House, supposedly abandoned and haunted. They find Willows House occupied, and the current owner, scientist Dr. Eric Vornoff, denies them hospitality. They attempt to force their entry into the house, but are then scared off by Vornoff's mute assistant Lobo. With the hunters on the run, Vornoff heads to his laboratory through a secret tunnel behind a fireplace and releases a giant octopus from its tank to send it after the hunters. The octopus kills one of them, while Lobo captures the other as he tries to save his friend from the octopus. Vornoff experiments on the unwilling hunter, who dies on the operating table.

There are now twelve missing victims. Reporter Janet Lawton vows to go to Lake Marsh to investigate. Officer Tom Robbins and Lieutenant Dick Craig, Janet's fiancé, talk to Professor Vladimir Strowski, an intellectual from Europe who agrees to assist in investigating the Marsh but not at night. That night, another storm begins. Janet drives alone to Lake Marsh, but visibility is poor, and she drives off the road and into a ravine. Lobo rescues her.

Janet awakens to find herself a prisoner of Vornoff, who uses hypnosis to put her back to sleep. The following day, Craig and Robbins drive to the area around Lake Marsh, a swamp. The partners discuss the strange weather and mention that the newspapers could be right about "the atom bomb explosions distorting the atmosphere". The duo eventually discovers Janet's abandoned car; she becomes the thirteenth missing victim. They leave the swamp while Strowski drives a rented car to the swamp.

Janet awakens at Willows House. Vornoff assures her that Lobo is harmless, but the giant seems fascinated with Janet. Lobo is human, and Vornoff found him in the "wilderness of Tibet". Vornoff hypnotically places Janet back to sleep. He orders Lobo to transport her to Vornoff's private quarters.

Meanwhile, Strowski approaches Willows House and enters through the unlocked front door. While Strowski searches the house, Vornoff arrives to greet him. Their country of origin is interested in Vornoff's experiments with atomic energy and wants to recruit him. Two decades prior, Vornoff had suggested using experiments with nuclear power, which could create superhumans of great strength and size. In response, he was branded a madman and exiled by his country. Strowski dreams of conquest in their country's name, while Vornoff dreams of his creations conquering in his own name. Disappointed that Vornoff has no intention of returning home to their country, Strowski threatens him with a gun but is then attacked by Lobo, dragged to the lab and forced into the octopus's tank, where it kills him. Meanwhile, Craig and Robbins return to the swamp and discover Strowski's abandoned car. The partners split up to search the area, Craig heading towards Willows House. In the secret laboratory, Vornoff uses a wave of his hand to telepathically summon Janet to his current location. She arrives dressed as a bride. Vornoff has decided to use her as the next subject of his experiments. Lobo is reluctant to participate in this experiment, and Vornoff uses a whip to re-assert his control over him. Meanwhile, Craig enters the house and accidentally discovers the secret passage to the lab. He is himself captured by Vornoff and Lobo.

Bride of the Monster (full film)

As the experiment is about to begin, Lobo is distressed. He decides to rebel and knocks Vornoff out. Lobo then releases Janet and transports the unconscious Vornoff to the operating table. Vornoff becomes the subject of his own human experiment. This time the experiment works and Vornoff transforms into an atomic-powered superhuman being. He and Lobo physically struggle, and their fight destroys the laboratory and starts a fire. Lobo is electrocuted when Vornoff shoves him into a control panel. Vornoff grabs Janet and escapes from the flames. Robbins and other officers arrive to help Craig. The police pursue Vornoff through the woods. There is another thunderstorm, and a lightning strike further destroys Willows House. With his home and equipment destroyed, a distressed Vornoff abandons Janet and attempts to escape. Craig rolls a rock at him and lands him in the water with the octopus. They struggle until a nuclear explosion obliterates both combatants. Apparently, the end result of the chain reaction started at the destroyed laboratory. Robbins says of Vornoff "he tampered in God's domain".

== Cast ==
- Bela Lugosi as Dr. Eric Vornoff
- Tor Johnson as Lobo
- Tony McCoy as Lt. Dick Craig
- Loretta King as Janet Lawton
- Harvey B. Dunn as Captain Robbins
- George Becwar as Professor Strowski
- Paul Marco as Officer Kelton
- Don Nagel as Martin
- Bud Osborne as Mac
- John Warren as Jake
- Ann Wilner as Tillie
- Dolores Fuller as Margie
- William "Billy" Benedict as Newsboy
- Ben Frommer as Drunk

== Production and release ==
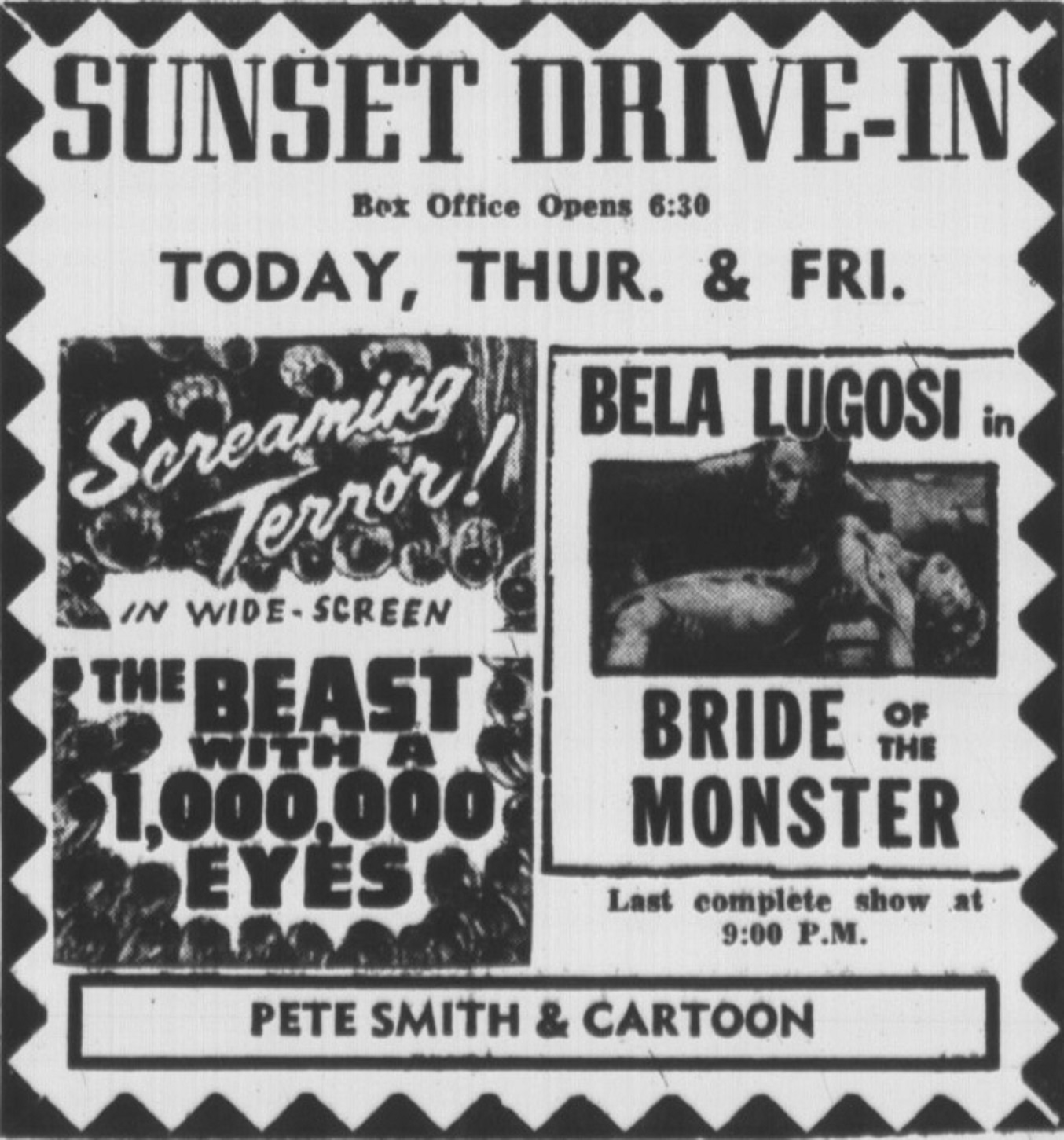
Drive-in advertisement from 1956 for Bride of the Monster and co-feature, The Beast with a Million Eyes

The first incarnation of the film was a 1953 script by Alex Gordon titled The Atomic Monster, but a lack of financing prevented any production. Later Ed Wood revived the project as The Monster of the Marshes. Actual shooting began in October 1954 at the Ted Allan Studios, but further money problems quickly halted the production. The required funds were supplied by a meat packing plant owner named Donald McCoy, who became credited as the film's producer on the condition that his son Tony was to star as the film's hero. According to screenwriter Dennis Rodriguez, casting the younger McCoy as a protagonist was one of two terms Donald imposed on Wood. The other term was to include an atomic explosion at the film's finale. Production resumed in 1955 at Centaur Studios.

Actor George Becwar, who played the bearded Russian agent Strowski, after getting paid for his one day of work on the film, complained to the Screen Actors Guild that he had been underpaid and caused the production to be temporarily shut down for an investigation. Wood as a result had to raise more money from backers and lost another piece of the ownership of the film as a result. An actor friend of Wood's, John Andrews, said in an interview: "Eddie hated, loathed, despised, wanted murdered, George Becwar ....I'm not overdoin' it man, I'm telling you straight. He hated George Becwar to the day he deceased, and I mean with a passion!"

The film premiered at Hollywood's Paramount theater on May 11, 1955, under the title Bride of the Atom. Wood related the story of how, after the film played, he asked the theater's manager what he thought of the picture, to which the manager replied "Stinks". Wood took scissors and physically cut the man out of an 8 X 10 group shot that was taken that night after the premiere as a publicity photo. When asked "Who was that you cut out?", Wood replied "Well, he's not there any more, so it doesn't matter".

The film was officially released in February 1956 under the "Bride of the Monster" title, on a double feature with The Beast with a Million Eyes. The film was reportedly completed and released through a deal with attorney Samuel Z. Arkoff. Arkoff profited from the film more than Wood, and his earnings contributed to the funding of his American International Pictures. Wood had oversold shares in the picture and wound up owning none of it himself. The ending credits identify the copyright holder of the film as "Filmakers Releasing Organization". Distribution rights were held by Banner Films in the United States, and by Exclusive in the United Kingdom.

== Analysis ==
=== Genre and background ===
The film combines elements of science fiction and horror fiction, genres which were frequently combined in films of the 1950s. Like many of these contemporaries, Bride serves in part as a Cold War propaganda film. The country of origin for Vornoff and Strowski is left unnamed. The only clues is that it is European and has its own dreams of conquest. By implication, the country which exiled Vornoff in the 1930s could be Nazi Germany or the Soviet Union. Their role as villains for the American cinema had already been solidified by the 1950s, and Wood could be alluding to both of them. Strowski uses the term master race, which is a key concept in Nazism.

Both the working title "Bride of the Atom" and the final title Bride of the Monster allude to the film Bride of Frankenstein (1935). The film otherwise follows the template of the Poverty Row horror films of the 1940s. The Atomic Age influences the film in its ominous implications concerning nuclear weapons and the threat they posed towards human civilization.

=== Content ===
This was Bela Lugosi's last speaking role in a feature film. Lugosi subsequently played a silent part in The Black Sleep (1956). Plan 9 from Outer Space (1957) uses silent archive footage of Lugosi, since he died prior to the creation of its script. Lock Up Your Daughters (1959) recycled footage from Lugosi's earlier films, possibly mixed with some new material.

According to Rob Craig, in Bride, Lugosi for the last time plays "a charismatic villain whose megalomania leads to downfall and destruction". Craig considers this to be one of Lugosi's finest roles, citing the surprisingly energetic performance of the aging actor. The scenes involving hypnosis contain close-ups of Lugosi's eyes. Wood was probably trying to recreate similar scenes from an older film of Lugosi's, White Zombie (1932). Lugosi did not actually play Vornoff in the scenes demanding physicality. The film made use of body doubles for Lugosi: Eddie Parker and Red Reagan. Parker was also the body-double of Lugosi in Frankenstein Meets the Wolf Man (1943). Lugosi's fee for the film is estimated to have been $1,000.00.

The story is similar to an earlier Bela Lugosi movie, The Corpse Vanishes (1942). In both movies, each bride at her wedding was given an orchid, which she sniffed before passing out. In The Corpse Vanishes, Lugosi played a doctor who captured the brides and took some kind of liquid from each bride's body and injected it into his wife to make her temporarily young again. Characters included his wife, an old woman, the old woman's grown son, and a dwarf. In Bride of the Monster, Lugosi again plays a doctor doing experiments, but his only housemate/assistant is Lobo, and when his experiment fails to turn someone into an "atomic-powered superman", he throws the dead subject to an octopus or an alligator, similar to Lugosi throwing a body into a river in Murders in the Rue Morgue (1932).

The hunters of the opening scenes, Jake Long and Blake "Mac" McCreigh, were played by John Warren and Bud Osborne. The police station scenes feature cameos by a drunk and a newspaper seller. The former is played by Ben Frommer (known for playing Count Bloodcount in Transylvania 6-5000). The latter is played by William Benedict (known as one of The Bowery Boys). Janet Lawton briefly speaks with a co-worker called Margie. Margie is played by Dolores Fuller (Ed Wood's girlfriend at the time). Dick Craig's partner, Martin, is played by Don Nagel. Both Fuller and Nagel had worked with Wood in Wood's previous film Jail Bait (1954).

The film uses stock footage of a real octopus, and a fake, rubber octopus in scenes where "the monster" interacts with the actors. It is widely believed this was a prop from the John Wayne film Wake of the Red Witch (1948). Contradictory accounts claim that Wood either stole or legally rented the prop from Republic Pictures, which produced the earlier film. The struggle between Vornoff and the octopus was filmed at Griffith Park.

Craig comments that there is a stark contrast between the characters of Dick Craig and Janet Lawton. Dick speaks in a deadpan unemotional way and seems to be a rather lethargic character. Janet is a "brassy girl reporter", a dynamic character with a sense of autonomy. The role of Janet was reportedly intended for Dolores Fuller. According to Fuller's recollections, Loretta King bribed Wood into casting her as Janet, with promises of securing further funding for the film. Fuller was thus reduced to playing a cameo role, "Margie", and this led to her later breakup with Ed Wood and her moving to New York to start a songwriting career with Elvis Presley. King always vehemently denied bribing Wood in any way, saying the story was ridiculous since she never had any money to invest in films in the 1950s.

In a subplot of the film, there are storms every night for three months and strange weather patterns. The characters attribute the phenomenon to the effects the nuclear explosions have on the atmosphere. This probably reflects actual anxiety of the 1950s about potential climate change. Until the Partial Nuclear Test Ban Treaty (1963), atmospheric nuclear weapons testing was used widely and recklessly. Rob Craig suggests that the months of constant storms could be inspired by the Genesis flood narrative. In the context of the film, the strange weather is implied to be a side-effect of the experiments of Vornoff which apparently release radioactivity into the atmosphere.

The dialogue of the film includes lines such as "Home? I have no home!", "One is always considered mad, when one discovers something which others cannot grasp", and the closing "He tampered in God's domain." The phrases could well apply to the fates of avant-garde artists and thinkers. The title "Bride of the Atom", which Vornoff uses for Janet in the bridal dress, is inexplicable unless the scientist is actually attempting to use Janet to replace his long-lost wife. One of his reassuring lines to Janet concerning the experiment, "It hurts, just for a moment, but then you will emerge a woman...", sounds as if he is preparing her for the loss of her virginity. The scene of a young woman, in a bridal gown, restrained by leather shackles seems to be sadomasochistic in nature.

Throughout the film, the mute Lobo is implied to have an unspecified intellectual disability and to be of sub-human intelligence. Yet he successfully operates complex machinery as if trained to do so. Craig views this scene as implying that supposedly "dumb" servants can have a capacity of learning the secrets of their masters.

The final scenes, with the mushroom cloud of the nuclear explosion, use stock footage from the blast of a thermonuclear weapon ("hydrogen bomb").

The apparent fetish of Lobo with angora wool is a reflection of Wood's own fetish for the material. This serves as the film's connection to Glen or Glenda (1953), where the fetish plays a more prominent role. In 1961's The Beast of Yucca Flats, Johnson strangely pets and hugs a rabbit as he dies in that film's finale.

The character of Lobo appeared again in Wood's Night of the Ghouls, horribly burned but still alive. This film serves as a sequel of sorts to Bride. Vornoff is absent from the later film, but there are references to the activities of "the mad doctor". Tor Johnson also plays a character called Lobo in The Unearthly (1957) who also serves as a henchman to the main villain.

This film is part of what Wood aficionados refer to as "The Kelton Trilogy", a trio of films featuring Paul Marco as Officer Kelton, a whining, reluctant policeman. The other two films are Plan 9 from Outer Space and Night of the Ghouls. Kelton is the only character to appear in all three films.

== Critical reception ==
Writing for Famous Monsters in 1962, Joe Dante included Bride of the Monster on his list of the worst horror films of all time. Dante declared it as "definitely one of the most inexpensive thrillers ever. The sets were cardboard, and the direction card-boring." Film critic Glenn Erickson wrote in DVD Talk that "nearly every dialogue exchange is an embarrassment and every camera setup somehow wrong," but noted that Lugosi's performance "is better than okay, rising to the demands of the awful script," and that the film is "too endearing to hate." A review by Bruce Eder in AllMovie noted that the film "is ineptly made and it has seams - including mismatched interior and exterior sets and scenery that shakes during the fight scenes," that it has "some of the strangest incidental dialogue that anyone had ever heard," and that "there is a lot to laugh at in the movie, most of it unintentional." A review of the film in TV Guide described it as a "masterpiece of involuntary farce," that the "marvelously idiotic dialog keeps things moving along without stopping for breath [or] logic," and that the "final images of poor old decrepit Lugosi struggling in the arms of a motionless rubber octopus are incomparably bathetic."

== Legacy ==
In 1986, the film was featured in the syndicated series the Canned Film Festival.

The making of the film is depicted in the film Ed Wood (1994).

The late 1990s dream trance track "Alright", by DJ Taucher, sampled a monologue from Bela Lugosi during the interlude of the song.

In 2005, The Devil's Rejects footage of the film was played in the movie.

In 2008, a colorized version was released by Legend Films. This version was also released on Amazon Video on Demand.

In 2010, a retrospective on the movie entitled Citizen Wood: Making 'The Bride', Unmaking the Legend was included in the Mystery Science Theater 3000 Volume 19 DVD set as a bonus feature for said episode featuring the movie. Horror host Mr. Lobo is among the interviewees of the 27 minute documentary.

=== Mystery Science Theater 3000 ===
Bride of the Monster was featured on episode #423 of the comedy series Mystery Science Theater 3000. The episode features a short, the first half of the Jam Handy short "Hired," and premiered on Comedy Central on January 23, 1993. Joel Robinson, Crow T. Robot, Tom Servo and Gypsy parody the short by performing "Hired! The Musical". The last line of the film — "He tampered in God's domain" — was a favorite of the writers, and variations of the line showed up in subsequent episodes.

In his rankings of the first twelve seasons of MST3K, Paste writer Jim Vorel placed the episode at #90 (Note: Ranking based on 197 episodes as of 2018.). "The acting is atrocious," Vorel writes, "full of weirdo Ed Wood character actors," which includes the "bumbly, rumbly visage of Tor Johnson." Writer Chris Morgan includes the film in a list of the ten worst films included on MST3K.

The MST3K version of the film is included as part of the Mystery Science Theater 3000, Volume XIX DVD collection, released by Shout! Factory on November 9, 2010. Special features with the film include the documentary Citizen Wood: Making the Bride, Unmaking the Legend and the movie's theatrical trailer. The other episodes in the four-disc set utilize the films Robot Monster (#107), Devil Doll (#818), and Devil Fish (#911).

== Controversies ==
In 1980, the book The Golden Turkey Awards claims that Lugosi's character declares his manservant Lobo (Tor Johnson) is "as harmless as a kitchen" [sic]. This allegedly misspoken line is cited as evidence of either Lugosi's failing health/mental faculties, or as further evidence of Wood's incompetence as a director. However, a viewing of the film itself reveals that Lugosi said this line correctly, the exact words being, "Don't be afraid of Lobo; he's as gentle as a kitten." The easier explanation would be that authors Michael Medved and Harry Medved saw the film in a theater setting with inferior sound quality, or viewed a damaged print. A single viewing in such conditions could result in mishearing some lines of dialogue. The inaccurate claim managed to achieve urban legend status, and continues circulating.

The biopic Ed Wood portrays the filmmakers stealing the mechanical octopus (previously used in the film Wake of the Red Witch) from the Republic Studios backlot, while failing to steal the motor which enabled the prop to move realistically. These events are alleged to have actually occurred in the 2004 documentary The 50 Worst Movies Ever Made. However, other stories circulated that Wood legitimately rented the octopus, along with some cars, for the picture. To remedy the lack of movement from the octopus prop, whenever someone was killed by the monster in the film, they simply flailed around in the shallow water while holding the tentacles around themselves to imitate its movements.

Rudolph Grey's book Nightmare of Ecstasy: The Life and Art of Edward D. Wood Jr. contains anecdotes regarding the making of this film. Grey notes that participants in the original events sometimes contradict one another, but he relates each person's information for posterity. He also includes Ed Wood's claim that only one of his films made a profit and surmises that it was most likely Bride of the Monster, but that Wood had oversold the film and could not reimburse all of the backers afterward. Most biographies mention The Violent Years as being Wood's most profitable film, though he did not produce or direct it.

== See also ==
- List of American films of 1955
- List of killer octopus films
- Ed Wood filmography
