= Timothy Farrell =

American actor

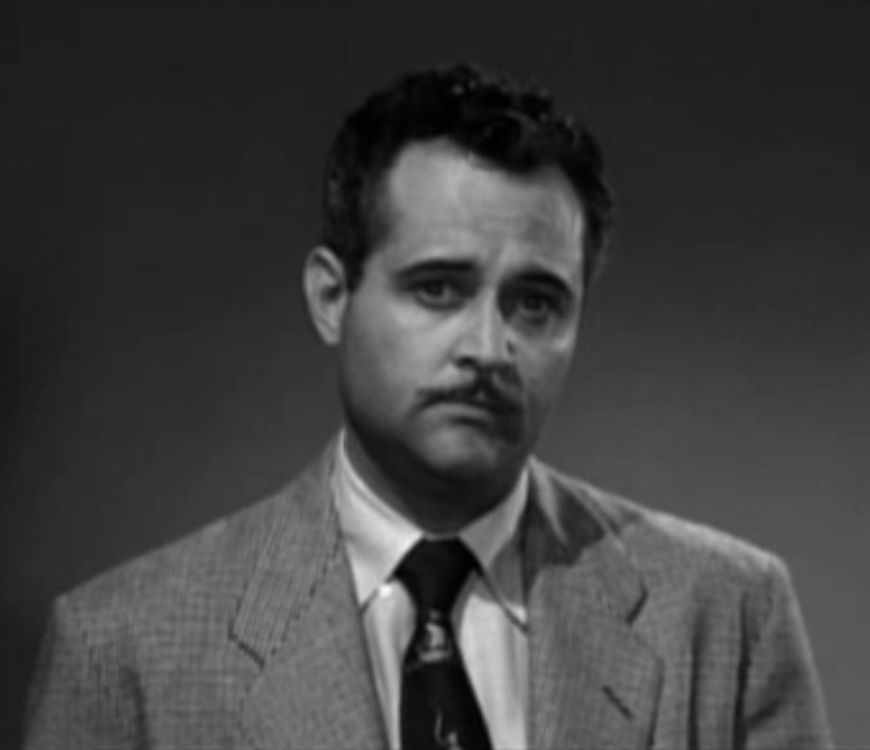
- In the 1954 film Jail Bait
- Born: Timothy Sperl; June 26, 1922; Los Angeles, California, U.S.
- Died: May 9, 1989 (aged 66); Santa Monica, California, U.S.
- Occupations: Actor, activist, businessman

Timothy Farrell (birth name: Timothy Sperl)(June 26, 1922 – May 9, 1989) was an American film actor, best known for his roles in Ed Wood films such as Jail Bait, The Violent Years and Glen or Glenda. He also worked for the County Marshal of Los Angeles, California.

== Early life ==
Born as Timothy Sperl, he was a native of Los Angeles and graduate of Alexander Hamilton High School. During World War II Farrell served in the Army Air Corps.

Farrell worked as a Bailiff for the Los Angeles Marshal's Department while also working in low-budget exploitation movies. In 1948 he portrayed a doctor in the film Test Tube Babies, explaining to a young couple that there is no shame in test-tube fertilization (a similar role to that in the subsequent Glen or Glenda). Both films were produced by George Weiss, who used Farrell in a string of exploitation films in the 1950s. In 1951, Farrell, along with everyone else on the film set of Paris After Midnight, was swept up in a police vice raid, which caused him professional embarrassment with his courtroom career.

== Characters ==
Farrell's career was notable for its recurring roles:

- He made three low-budget exploitation movies for George Weiss in which he played the part of sleazy gymnasium owner Umberto Scalli. These films, largely a vehicle for female-wrestling footage, include Devil's Sleep, Racket Girls, and Dance Hall Racket. Scalli is gunned down at the end of Racket Girls but alive and well in Dance Hall Racket.
- His character of "Joe the Pimp" appeared in Girl Gang and Gun Girls.
- His character of "Dr. Wright" appeared in Hometown Girls and the aforementioned Test Tube Babies.
- In 1954, his legal and theatrical careers dovetailed in the George Cukor movie A Star Is Born, in which he played a bailiff. It happened again in 1958, when he appeared as a bailiff in the short-lived television series Accused.

== L.A. County Marshal's Office ==
He went on to work 26 years for the Los Angeles County Marshal's Office, rising through the ranks and eventually was appointed the County Marshal in 1971. However, in 1975 he was fired after his conviction on felony charges for "illegal use of deputy marshals in political activities". He was given a six-month sentence, but received probation due to poor health.

== Personal life ==
His later years were spent in business, such as operating a lumber mill in South Dakota and rental properties in Los Angeles, California. He was extremely active in the "Animal Rights and Welfare Movement", begun by his wife, Shirley. He donated some of his estate to "The Sperl Family Foundation", a no-cost spay and neuter organization for animals.

His daughter, Timmie, was a bit part actress on the soap opera General Hospital, and died from a drug overdose. His son, Anthony Kelly Sperl, runs the Sperl Family Foundation from his residence in Sun Valley, California. Anthony had briefly been a police officer in Stanton, California, until March 1983 when he fatally shot 5-year-old Patrick Andrew Mason in his home, mistaking the boy's toy gun for a real weapon. Sperl quit the force, claiming post-traumatic stress disorder and was awarded a disability pension soon after being cleared of wrongdoing.

== Death ==
Farrell died on May 9, 1989, aged 66, at St. John's Hospital in Santa Monica, California of a heart attack. He was preceded in death by his wife Shirley who also was an actress. She died of natural causes.

== Filmography ==
Year	Title	Role	Director	Notes
1948	Test Tube Babies	Dr. Wright	W. Merle Connell	
1948	Hometown Girl	Dr. Wright	W. Merle Connell	
1949	The Devil's Sleep	Umberto Scalli	W. Merle Connell	
1951	Racket Girls	Umberto Scalli	Robert C. Dertano	
1951	Paris After Midnight	Sargent Eddie	Robert C. Dertano	
1953	Dance Hall Racket	Umberto Scalli	Phil Tucker	
1953	Glen or Glenda	Dr. Alton / Narrator	Ed Wood	
1954	Jail Bait	Vic Brady	Ed Wood	
1954	A Star Is Born	Bailiff	George Cukor	Uncredited
1954	Girl Gang	Joe, a degenerate drug dealer	Robert C. Dertano	
1956	The Violent Years	Lt. Holmes	William Morgan	
1957	Gun Girls	Joe	Robert C. Dertano	
