= Dolores Fuller =

American actress and songwriter (1923–2011)

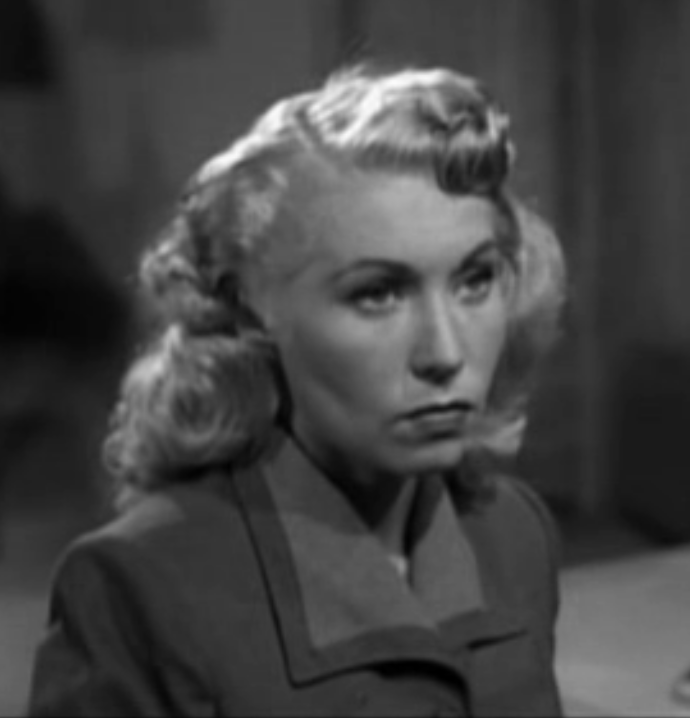
- Fuller in Jail Bait (1954)
- Born: Dolores Agnes Eble; March 10, 1923; South Bend, Indiana, United States
- Died: May 9, 2011 (aged 88); Las Vegas, Nevada, United States
- Resting place: Palm Memorial Park
- Other name: Sherry Caine
- Occupations: Actress; songwriter
- Years active: 1934, 1952–2000
- Spouses: Donald Kenneth Fuller (m. 1941; div. 1955); Philip Chamberlin (m. 1988)
- Children: 2

Dolores Agnes Fuller (née Eble, later Chamberlin; March 10, 1923 – May 9, 2011) was an American actress and songwriter. Beginning her career as a child actress, she made her acting debut in the romantic comedy film It Happened One Night (1934). Nearly two decades later, she had lead and supporting roles in films such as Glen or Glenda (1953), Jail Bait (1954), and Bride of the Monster (1955), all of which were written and directed by her then-boyfriend Ed Wood. After Fuller ended her relationship with Wood in 1955, she began a successful career as a songwriter, in which many of her songs were performed and recorded by Elvis Presley, Peggy Lee and Nat King Cole.

== Film career ==
Her first screen appearance was at the age of 10, when she appeared briefly in Frank Capra's It Happened One Night. According to Fuller, the female lead in Bride of the Monster was written for her but Wood gave it to Loretta King instead.

In August 1954, Fuller was cast in Wood's The Vampire's Tomb, intended to star Bela Lugosi. Frank Yaconelli was named as her co-star and 'comic killer'. The film was never made. She ended up making an appearance in Bride of the Monster (1956), also with Lugosi. Fuller hosted a benefit for Lugosi which preceded the showing of Bride of the Atom (early working title of Bride of the Monster) on May 11, 1955. A cocktail party was held at the Gardens Restaurant at 4311 Magnolia Avenue in Burbank, California. Vampira attended and was escorted by Paul Marco. A single screening of the film was presented at the Hollywood Paramount.

According to Fuller, as quoted in Wood biography Nightmare of Ecstasy (1992), she first met Ed Wood when she attended a casting call with a friend for a movie he was supposed to direct called Behind Locked Doors (which he did not go on to direct); it has also been stated that they met in a restaurant.

She became his girlfriend shortly thereafter and began acting in his films. Her movie career included a bit part in It Happened One Night (1934) and roles in Outlaw Women (1952), Glen or Glenda (1953), Body Beautiful (1953), The Blue Gardenia (1953), Count the Hours (1953), Mesa of Lost Women (1953), College Capers (1954), Jail Bait (1954), The Raid (1954), This Is My Love (1954), The Opposite Sex (1956), and many years later appearances in The Ironbound Vampire (1997) and Dimensions in Fear (1998).

== Television performer and songwriter ==
Fuller had already had earlier experience on television in Queen for a Day and The Dinah Shore Show.

She also appeared on an episode of It's a Great Life as "the blonde in the mink coat."

Fuller's ability as a songwriter manifested itself through the intervention of her friend, producer Hal Wallis; Fuller had wanted to get an acting role in the Elvis Presley movie Blue Hawaii, which Wallis was producing, but instead he put her in touch with Hill & Range, the publisher that provided Presley with songs. Fuller went into a collaborative partnership with composer Ben Weisman and co-wrote one song, "Rock-A-Hula Baby", for the film. Over time, this led to Presley recording a dozen of her songs, including "I Got Lucky" and "Spinout", primarily for his film soundtracks, though he also recorded "Cindy, Cindy" for his 1971 album Love Letters From Elvis. Fuller's music was also recorded by Nat 'King' Cole, Peggy Lee, and other leading talents of the time. Toward the end of her life, Dolores helped edit and score a short western film Ed Wood had begun, but never completed, in the 1940s called Crossroads of Laredo

== Private life ==
Dolores married Donald Fuller in 1941, with whom she had two children. At the time she met Ed Wood, she was in the process of divorcing her husband (they finally divorced in 1955). She and Wood shared an apartment together for several years. Wood biographer Rudolph Grey quotes Fuller as saying of the period before her success,

He [Ed Wood] begged me to marry him. I loved him in a way, but I couldn't handle the transvestism. I'm a very normal person. It's hard for me to deviate! I wanted a man that was all man… After we broke up, he would stand outside my home in Burbank and cry. "Let me in, I love you!" What good would I have done if I had married him? We would have starved together… I bettered myself. I had to uplift myself.

She has also been quoted as saying that "His dressing up didn't bother me—we all have our little queer habits" and giving Wood's drinking as the reason for their breakup.

Dolores remarried in 1988 at age 65, to Philip Chamberlin, and they remained married until her death in 2011. Fuller's autobiography, A Fuller Life: Hollywood, Ed Wood and Me, co-authored by Stone Wallace and Philip Chamberlin, was published in 2008.

== Portrayal in Ed Wood ==
Fuller was portrayed by Sarah Jessica Parker in Tim Burton's 1994 Wood biographical film Ed Wood, a portrayal of which she disapproved due to the fact that she was depicted smoking in the film, while Fuller said she herself was a lifelong non-smoker. She also complained that she was only portrayed as "sort of as an actress" and did not feel she was given credit for her other accomplishments and contributions towards Wood's career. However, she stated that she liked the film overall, praising Johnny Depp's performance in the title role.

== Filmography ==
=== Film ===
Year	Title	Role	Notes
1934	It Happened One Night	Minor role	Uncredited
1952	Outlaw Women	One of Uncle Barney's Girls	Uncredited; Alternative title: Boot Hill Mamas
1953	Glen or Glenda	Barbara	
1953	Girls in the Night	Beauty Contestant for Miss Third Avenue	Alternative title: Life After Dark
1953	The Blue Gardenia	Woman at bar	Uncredited
1953	Count the Hours	Reporter	Uncredited; Alternative title: Every Minute Counts
1953	Mesa of Lost Women	Blonde "Watcher in the Woods"	Alternative title: Lost Women
1953	The Body Beautiful	June	Credited as Sherry Caine
1953	The Moonlighter	Miss Buckwalter	Uncredited
1954	Jail Bait	Marilyn Gregor	Alternative title: Hidden Face
1954	Playgirl	Girl	Uncredited
1954	The Raid		Uncredited
1954	This Is My Love		Uncredited
1955	Bride of the Monster	Margie	cameo Alternative title: Bride of the Atom
1956	The Opposite Sex	Bit Role	Uncredited
1997	The Ironbound Vampire	Theresa Powell	Direct-to-video release
1998	Dimensions in Fear	TV Station Owner	Alternative titles: City in Terror; Dimension in Fear
2000	The Corpse Grinders 2	Patricia Grant	Direct-to-video release

=== Television ===
Year	Title	Role	Notes
1955	The Great Gildersleeve	Miss Carroll	1 episode
1955	It's a Great Life	Girl	1 episode
1956	Adventures of Superman	Lorraine	1 episode

== Discography ==
Songs recorded by Elvis Presley with lyrics by Dolores Fuller:

- "Rock-A-Hula Baby" (from the film Blue Hawaii, 1961)
- "I Got Lucky" (from the film Kid Galahad, 1962)
- "Steppin' Out of Line" (unused track from the Blue Hawaii sessions, first released on 1962 album Pot Luck)
- "You Can't Say No in Acapulco" (from the film Fun in Acapulco, 1963)
- "Beyond the Bend" (from the film It Happened at the World's Fair, 1963)
- "Barefoot Ballad" (from the film Kissin' Cousins, 1964)
- "Big Love, Big Heartache" (from the film Roustabout, 1964)
- "Do the Clam" (from the film Girl Happy, 1965)
- "Spinout" (from the film Spinout, 1966)
- "I'll Take Love" (from the film Easy Come, Easy Go, 1967)
- "Have a Happy" (from the film Change of Habit, 1969)
- "Cindy, Cindy" (Love Letters from Elvis, 1971 studio album)

According to AllMusic, other songs co-written by her include "I'll Touch a Star" by Terry Stafford, "Lost Summer Love" by Shelley Fabares and "Someone to Tell It To" by Nat King Cole.
