= Racket Girls =

- Directed by: Robert C. Dertano
- Written by: Robert C. Dertano
- Produced by: George Weiss
- Starring: Peaches Page; Timothy Farrell; Clara Mortenson; Rita Martinez
- Cinematography: William C. Thompson
- Production company: Arena Productions
- Distributed by: Screen Classics
- Release date: 1951
- Running time: 70 mins
- Country: United States
- Language: English

Racket Girls (also called Blonde Pickup and Pin Down Girls) is an American film noir crime film, directed by Robert C. Dertano and released in 1951 by Screen Classics.

== Plot ==
In the seedy underbelly of 1950s Los Angeles, Umberto Scalli is a small-time gangster who acts as a manager for women's wrestling in order to cover his involvement in many crime rings, including racketeering, bookmaking, and prostitution. He must dodge both police investigations and the local mob. Deep in debt to the mob for $35,000, Scalli finds himself squeezed between police investigations and dangerous collectors. He takes on the contract of Peaches Page, an up-and-coming wrestler, in order to drum up business.

As his fortunes worsen and the mob boss "Mr. Big" demands his money, Scalli desperately attempts to raise it, firing one of his bookies who is accused of pocketing money, and having his assistant Joe dope a horse to fix an upcoming race, only for Joe to accidentally kill the horse. At the same time, he begins an affair with the naïve Peaches, over the concerns of the trainer Ruby, who had previously warned Peaches about Scalli forcing a woman who owed him into prostitution, and who herself had fallen for Scalli's charm.

Scalli is summoned to appear before a committee investigating organized crime, while attempting to get wrestlers Clara Mortenson and Rita Martinez to throw their upcoming match to no avail. At the committee hearing, which is broadcast over the radio, a hearing member mentions that they will go after Mr. Big. Scalli works to gather funds to flee, but Monk, a bookmaker for Scalli, sells him out to Mr. Big; in turn, Mr. Big sends him and his men to the gym to take the money out of Scalli's safe. At the gym, Monk lets the gangsters in, and Scalli flees in his car while Joe is shot and killed running with him. Scalli is shot by one of Big's men in a car chase, as police cars follow them. Scalli attempts to flee by foot but bleeds out, and Big's men are arrested by the police.

== Cast ==
Real life wrestlers Peaches Page and Rita Martinez, as well as former world champion Clara Mortensen, play fictional versions of themselves.

- Peaches Page as Peaches Page
- Timothy Farrell as Umberto Scalli
- Clara Mortensen as Clara Mortensen, world champion
- Rita Martínez as Rita Martinez, champion of Mexico
- Muriel Gardner as Ruby McKenzie
- Don Ferrara as Joe the Jockey
- Matt Douglas as Ronnie, a mobster
- Paul Merton as Monk, a book-keeper
- Eric Schenk as Mugsy, fight fixer
- Matt Malinowski as Long Haired Enforcer
- Bruce Spencer as Eddie, a gangster
- Tony Zarro as Lefty, a mobster
- Mary Jean Walker as Jackie, a bookie
- William Lamont as Senate investigator
- Phil Bernard as Mr. Big, the gang leader
- Jimmy Lennon Sr. as Jimmy Lennon
- Phil Solomon as Phil Solomon, a referee

== Production ==
The film was produced by George Weiss and Arena Productions, a Metro-Goldwyn-Mayer-based company headed by Norman Felton.

== Derived works ==
The film was the subject of a 1994 episode of the sixth season of the movie-mocking show Mystery Science Theater 3000.
