= Chained Girls =

1965 American sexploitation film

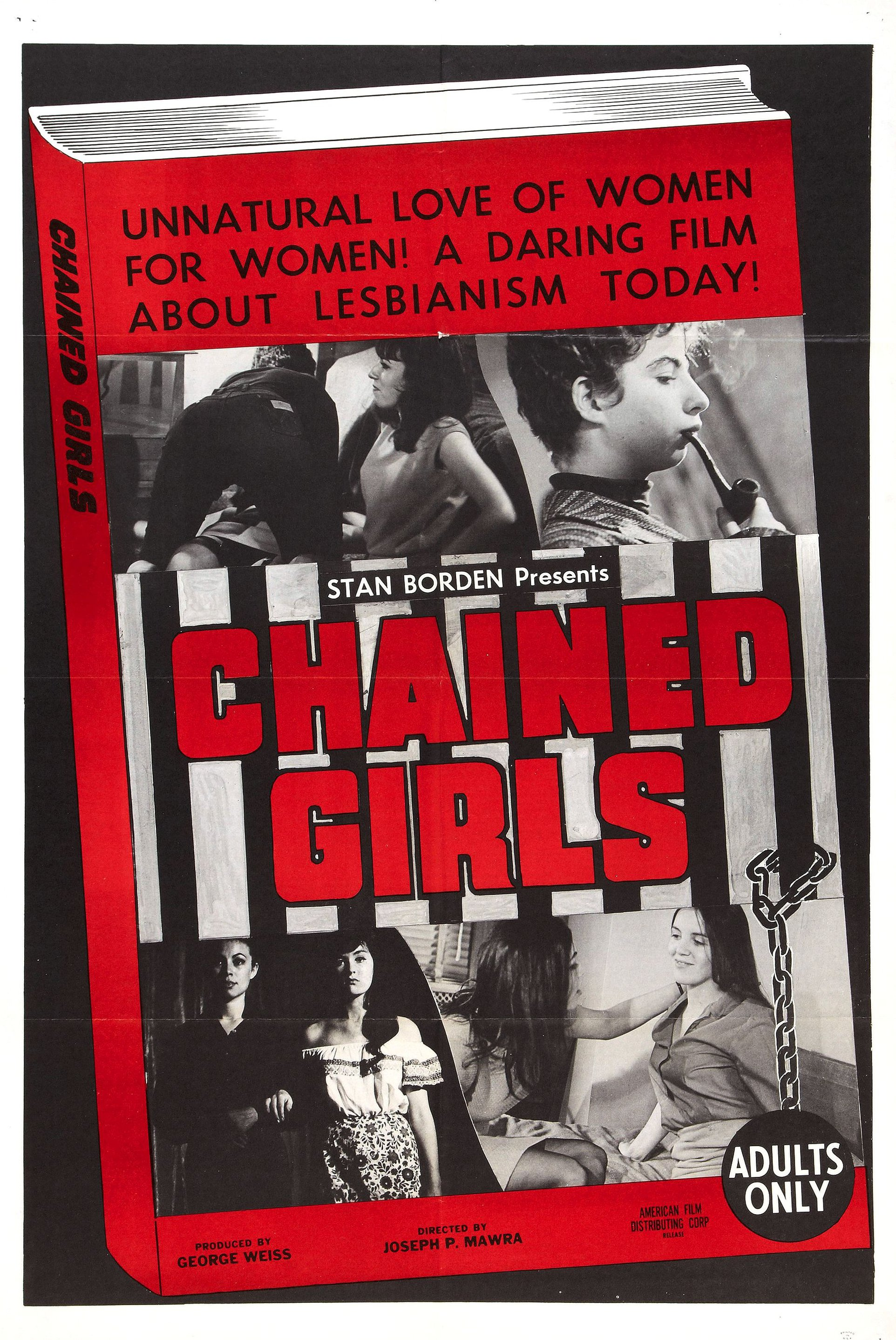
- Directed by: Joseph P. Mawra
- Written by: Joseph P. Mawra
- Produced by: George Weiss
- Starring: Marlene Eck; June Roberts; Marlene Starr
- Narrated by: Joel Holt
- Cinematography: Werner Rose
- Music by: Gene St. Jean
- Distributed by: American Film Distribution Corp.
- Release date: 1965
- Running time: 65 minutes
- Country: United States
- Language: English

Chained Girls is a 1965 American sexploitation film written and directed by Joseph P. Mawra. The film stars Marlene Eck, June Roberts and Marlene Starr. It was produced by George Weiss, best known for Glen or Glenda.

== Synopsis ==
This "exposé" takes a purported factual slant on gay culture. This was a way of getting around censorship, to include what was by the standards of the time fairly explicit material. It includes some bizarre scenes, including what purports to be a lesbian initiation, with a woman gang-raped by a group of dykes led by a bull dyke, and two dykes fighting each other (apparently to the death) over the same femme lesbian. The background music is by Tchaikovsky, who was gay.

The film opens with a voice-over that asks: "Who and what is a lesbian? Is lesbianism a disease or natural occurrence? Is it reserved for a few or a common happening? How do lesbians live? Are they happy with their lives? And how does society accept them?"

It consists of two auditory components: narration and orchestral music composed for the film. There is no dialogue, and there are only five visual elements: (1) scenes of the streets of New York City; (2) an interior recreation of a photo shoot at a modeling agency; (3) statistics compiled from medical reports in graphic form; (4) a narrative of a coming-out party in a "fashionable part of town"; and (5) a bedroom scene of prostitution virtually indistinguishable from the coming-out party.

== Cast ==
- Joel Holt (narrator)
- Marlene Eck
- Audren Campbell
- June Roberts
- Marlene Starr

== Release ==
The film was released on DVD by Something Weird Video, as a double feature with Daughters of Lesbos.

== Reception ==
Melissa Sky said in Bright Lights Film Journal that the film "is both hilarious and outrageous in its ignorance. Its promotion of excessive lip-licking, for example, as a reliable index of lesbianism, a kind of 1960s gaydar, is outright laughable, whereas other tropes, such as the scene of one dyke murdering another in a jealous rage, shirts torn open to reveal plenty of cleavage of course, prove more unnerving." She also observed that while "these types of exploitation films are viewed as mere trash; sorting through the trash of a culture can be extremely telling."

Lilian Jensen of The Lesbian News wrote "this 'lost' lesbian camp documentary is a priceless cinematic gem. Attempting to be objective about the 'problem' of lesbianism, the film takes us to their lairs to show us what these sexually deviant women do. There are hilarious statistics thrown in; explanations of the different types of lesbians and acted out scenes of seduction, indoctrination, and recruitment. Mothers hold hard to your daughters!"

Don Gorton wrote in The Gay & Lesbian Review Worldwide that "this film is the lesbian Reefer Madness, where gangs of baby butches terrorize everyone who falls in their path; lesbians have coming out parties, where the special moment is choreographed and the dykes draw straws in order to plan the femme's rite of initiation, which is gang rape." He further argues that "the patriarchal approach of the film is clear. Women are a sexualized commodity for straight men, and because lesbians reject that role, they are nothing at all." Gary Thompson from the Philadelphia Daily News also made the connection to Reefer Madness, calling it an "oddball documentary."

Erik Piepenburg of The New York Times said that "sexploitation looked to lesbians for titillation and shock; but in this purported documentary, their relationships were treated as real and valuable." Film historian Frank Henenlotter explained that "these were films about lesbians made by guys who didn't care about lesbians; they cared about showing two girls doing it rather than one girl and a guy."

== See also ==
- List of American films of 1965
- List of LGBTQ-related films of 1965
