= The Violent Years =

1956 film

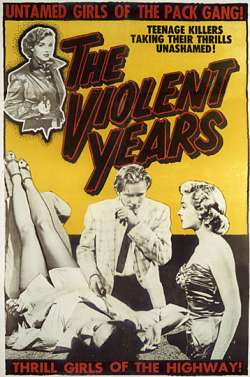
- Theatrical poster
- Directed by: William Morgan
- Written by: Ed Wood (screenwriter uncredited); Roy Reid (story)
- Produced by: Roy Reid
- Starring: Jean Moorhead; I. Stanford Jolley; Barbara Weeks; Timothy Farrell
- Cinematography: William C. Thompson
- Edited by: Gerard Wilson
- Distributed by: Headliner Productions
- Release date: 1956
- Running time: 57 minutes
- Country: United States
- Language: English
- Budget: $38,000

The Violent Years is a 1956 American exploitation film directed by William Morgan and starring Playboy Playmate Jean Moorhead as Paula Parkins, the leader of a gang of juvenile delinquent high school girls. The film is notable for having an uncredited Ed Wood as the author of its screenplay. It was released in 1956 on a double bill with the reissued 1954 German import Conchita and the Engineer (a.k.a. Macumba).

== Plot ==
Paula Parkins leads a gang of bored young women. The gang's core members—besides Paula—are Georgia, Phyllis, and Geraldine ("George", "Phil", and "Gerry" for short).

The gang agrees to wreck a school as the request of a local criminal, Sheila. (The film implies that Sheila is in league with the Communist Party and their anti-American movement.) Gerry and Phil are fatally shot while fleeing the wrecked school; Paula herself guns down one of the cops. Seeking refuge from the police, George and Paula return to Sheila's, where they report their wrecking of the school. But Sheila, who never had any intention of paying the girls, attempts to have them arrested as "loose ends"; as she reaches for the phone, Paula shoots and kills her. A highway patrolman notices the girls driving Sheila's car and wearing clothes from her wardrobe. In the heat of the ensuing car chase, the girls crash their car through a store's plate-glass window; George is killed and Paula is hospitalized. Because Paula is a minor and therefore ineligible for the death penalty, the judge sentences her to life imprisonment without possibility of parole. However, Paula gets a reprieve of sorts...dying from the complications of giving birth to a child she accidentally conceived, either from the man she and the gang "criminally attacked" in lover's lane or during her make-out party with Sheila's fellow mobsters. The judge who delivered Paula's conviction also denies Jane and Carl custody of their granddaughter, based on the neglectful way they raised Paula.

The cynical tag line "So what?" is used repeatedly by the girls to underscore their uncaring, nihilistic attitude.

== Cast ==
- Jean Moorhead as Paula Parkins
- Barbara Weeks as Jane Parkins
- Arthur Millan as Carl Parkins
- Theresa Hancock as Georgia
- Glen Corbett as Barney Stetson
- Joanne Cangi as Geraldine
- Gloria Farr as Phyllis
- Lee Constant as Sheila
- I. Stanford Jolley as Judge Clara
- Timothy Farrell as Lt. Holmes
- F. Chan McClure as Det. Artman
- Bruno Metsa as Manny
- Harry Keaton as Doctor

== Production ==
- The screenplay, originally titled Teenage Girl Gang, was written (without billing) by Edward D. Wood, Jr., the director of Glen or Glenda and Plan 9 from Outer Space. The Violent Years was the most financially successful film with creative input from Ed Wood.
- Star Jean Moorhead was the Playboy Playmate for October 1955.

The film's working titles were "Teenage Girl Gang" and "Teenage Killers". The opening credits indicate that Headliner Productions copyrighted the film in 1956. The Violent Years was actually based on the story by Roy Reid.

== Reception and legacy ==
Film historian Leonard Maltin savaged the picture giving it a rare BOMB rating calling it "tawdry and preachy" with "wooden acting all around..."

The industrial metal band Ministry incorporated many lines of the film's dialogue in their song "So What?" from the 1989 album The Mind Is a Terrible Thing to Taste. Long stretches of the judge's monologue are used in two different parts of the song ("you have had all that money can give you...", "kill for a thrill", etc), as well as multiple characters' readings of the song's titular line.

The film was mocked on a 1994 episode of Mystery Science Theater 3000 (Season 6, Episode 10). Subjects for jokes included the occasionally wooden acting, the same car-on-road shots being repeated, and the judge's rambling closing monologue.

=== Home media ===
The film was released on VHS several times, including a release under Rhino's "Teenage Theater" banner- hosted by Mamie Van Doren. The film received several DVD releases of varying quality, one from Something Weird Video, as part of the Ed Wood box set Big Box of Wood, and the box set of vintage exploitation films called Girls Gone Bad.

On November 21, 2017, the film was released on Blu-ray through a partnership by Something Weird Video and the American Genre Film Archive (AGFA) including a commentary track from Frank Henenlotter and Rudolph Grey.

== See also ==
- List of American films of 1956
- Girls with guns
- Ed Wood filmography
