= Girl gang (disambiguation) =

A gang is a group or society of associates, friends or members of a family with a defined leadership and internal organization.

Girl gang may also refer to:

- Girl Gang, American crime film
- "Girl Gang" (Ciara song), song by Ciara featuring on her album Beauty Marks
- Girl Gang Boss Detective: Revenge of the Three Kazama Sisters, Japanese film
