= George Weiss (producer) =

American film producer

- Born: George G. Weiss; United States
- Occupation: Film producer
- Years active: 1954–1993

George G. Weiss was an American film producer who specialized in independent 'road show' exploitation Z movies during the 1950s and sexploitation shockers in the 1960s that openly defied the motion picture production code of the day.

== Glen or Glenda ==
Weiss is best known as the producer who funded the exploitation film Glen or Glenda (1953) directed by Ed Wood, originally conceived as a fictionalized story of the sexual reassignment surgery of Christine Jorgensen. When Jorgensen refused to collaborate on the film, Wood wrote a new autobiographical script about his own struggle with being a closet transvestite and added stock film footage about sexual reassignment surgery. Weiss appears in the film in an uncredited cameo as "man at transvestite's suicide." Adding to the film's already extensive fantasy sequence, Weiss included incongruous scenes of scantily clad women, bondage, and whipping taken from another project inspired by the fetish films of Irving Klaw. This was done partly to increase the film's length up to the required 70 minutes.

In 1956, Weiss backed another Wood project, a juvenile delinquent film with the working title Hellborn. The project was soon abandoned. Wood later incorporated the footage into his films The Sinister Urge and Night of the Ghouls.

== Timothy Farrell films ==
Another connection between Weiss and Ed Wood is actor Timothy Farrell, the sympathetic doctor in Glen or Glenda. Farrell had a major role as a gangster in Wood's Jail Bait, and a supporting part in The Violent Years.

For Weiss, Farrell also played doctors in Hometown Girl (1949) and Test Tube Babies (1948), an exploitation film about artificial insemination. In 1951 he was in the risque burlesque film Paris After Midnight with famous stripper Tempest Storm.

He played Umberto Scalli, a sleazy gymnasium owner and drug pusher in three films: The Devil's Sleep (1949), Racket Girls (a.k.a. Pin Down Girls (1951)) and Dance Hall Racket (1954) with iconoclastic comedian Lenny Bruce in his only film role. These films were largely an excuse for showcasing "cat fight" female-wrestling footage.

In Girl Gang (1954), Farrell plays another degenerate drug dealer in a film noteworthy for showing the step-by-step process of preparing and injecting heroin. (Weiss did not shy away from taboo subjects in any of his films.)

== Stock footage features ==
As did Ed Wood, Weiss also cobbled together footage from other sources and created a flimsy plot as a framing device. From his collection of erotic burlesque films he released Hollywood After Midnight, Baghdad After Midnight (both 1954) and The Peek Snatchers (1965), among others.

Nudist Life (1961) was mostly put together from assorted nudist camp films from the previous two decades.

Weiss even stole from himself, as in The Pill (1967), which he also directed. The bulk of the film is recycled from Test Tube Babies dressed up as a clinical study on birth control.

Many of Weiss' films are presented in a pseudo-documentary style accompanied by earnest voice-over narration (pretending to be an educational film was a way to circumvent censorship laws). Chained Girls (1965) is an example of this practice.

== The Olga series ==
Besides Glen or Glenda, Weiss may be best remembered for producing some of the first "roughie" sexploitation films of the 1960s with his "Olga" series. Directed by Joseph P. Mawra and starring Audrey Campbell as the sadistic white slaver Olga, Weiss unleashed Olga's House of Shame (which he also co-wrote), White Slaves of Chinatown, Olga's Girls (all from 1964), Mme. Olga's Massage Parlor (1965) and Olga's Dance Hall Girls (1969). Weiss has a brief role as a doctor in White Slaves of Chinatown. Although tame by today's standards, the series was shocking and unique in its day. Underground filmmaker John Waters cites Olga's House of Shame as a major early influence.

Weiss was friendly with New York filmmaker Michael Findlay and his wife Roberta Findlay, an actress and cinemaphotographer. In 1964 Weiss encouraged them to follow in the trail blazed by the Olga films. The Findlays went on to make a series of even more extreme sexploitation films, including The Touch of Her Flesh and its two sequels.

- Weiss was played by actor Mike Starr in Tim Burton's 1994 biographical film Ed Wood.
- Weiss is quoted at length throughout the interview-filled oral history biography on Ed Wood: Nightmare of Ecstasy: The Life and Art of Edward D. Wood, Jr., by Rudolph Grey (Feral House, Inc., 1992).
