= The Devil's Sleep =

- Film poster
- Directed by: W. Merle Connell
- Written by: Richard S. McMahan
- Produced by: George Weiss
- Production company: Screen Classics
- Release date: 1949
- Running time: 70 minutes
- Country: United States
- Language: English

The Devil's Sleep is a 1949 exploitation film directed by W. Merle Connell and produced by George Weiss. Connell had previously directed a number of American burlesque films. The film looks at juvenile delinquency, phony women's health gyms, and the pushing of narcotics to teenagers. Using many of the same cast and crew as Test Tube Babies, the film is the first of Timothy Farrell's "Umberto Scalli" trilogy.

== Plot ==
Umberto Scalli has returned from a prison sentence with two lucrative enterprises: a women's health spa that gives the women Dinitrophenol tablets that reduce weight but may have dangerous side effects; and selling Benzedrine to teenagers through a young man who provides them through swinging parties held at a house Scalli owns. Some of the teenagers attempt to pay for their drugs by committing burglaries. Judge Rosalind Ballentine and Police Detective Sergeant Dave Kerrigan unite to end the menace, but Scalli attempts to blackmail the judge with photographs of her daughter Margie willfully drugged and nude at one of the parties.

== Cast ==
- Lita Grey ... Judge Rosalind Ballentine
- William Thomason ... Detective Sergeant Dave Kerrigan
- Will Charles ... Inspector Darnell
- Timothy Farrell ... Umberto Scalli
- Fred Smith ... Tony Donardi
- Muriel Gardner ... Ruby McKenzie
- Jim Tyde ... Bob Winter
- Stan Freed ... Hal Holmes
- Tracy Lynne ... Margie Ballantine
- John Mitchum ... Intern
- George Eiferman as Himself

== See also ==
- List of films in the public domain in the United States
