= Test tube baby (disambiguation) =

A test tube baby is baby conceived through in vitro fertilisation, or specifically the first such child, Louise Brown.

It may also refer to:

- Brainiac's Test Tube Baby, a TV programme
- Test Tube Babies (film), a 1948 film
