= Gun Girls =

- Film poster
- Directed by: Robert C. Dertano
- Written by: Robert C. Dertano (based on his novel Girls on Parole)
- Produced by: Edward Finney as Edward Frank
- Starring: Jeanne Ferguson; Timothy Farrell; Jacquelyn Park; Eve Brent
- Cinematography: William C. Thompson
- Production company: Eros Productions
- Distributed by: Astor Pictures
- Release date: 1957
- Running time: 67 mins
- Country: United States
- Language: English

Gun Girls is an American crime film, written, edited and directed by Robert C. Dertano as well as being based on Dertrano's novel Girls on Parole. The film starred Jeanne Ferguson, Jacquelyn Park, Eve Brent and Timothy Farrell and was released in 1957 by Astor Pictures.

== Plot ==
Joy beats up Trixie after finding her in her boyfriend's apartment

Teenagers Teddy (Ferguson) and Dora (Park) rob a man of his wallet. Dora's boyfriend Jimmy (Booth) tries to talk her out of associating with Teddy, but Dora refuses to listen. Using the money they have saved from previous crimes, they buy two guns from Joe (Farrell) and hold up a gas station. Joe then convinces the girls to steal a $6,000 payroll from a chemical company where his girlfriend Joy (Brent) works. After discovering that they only ended up with $14 the two girls ask Joe for money so they can leave the area and avoid arrest. When he refuses, they pull their guns on him and take his money. Joy then comes by Joe's apartment and tells him that she is pregnant, resulting in Joe throwing her out of his apartment. Later, when she returns, she finds his new girlfriend, Trixie (Cameron), in the apartment. The two girls fight and a beaten Trixie leaves. Joe returns to the apartment and surprises Joy, who shoots him. Teddy is killed in a car crash and Dora is mortally injured when they are chased by the police attempting to flee the area. At the hospital, just before she dies, Dora tells Jimmy that she was wrong and should have listened to him.

== Cast ==
- Jeanne Ferguson as Teddy
- Jacquelyn Park as Dora Jones
- Eve Brent as Joy Jenkins (as Jean Ann Lewis)
- Timothy Farrell as Joe
- Calvin Booth as Jimmy
- Eleoise Cameron as Trixie

== See also ==
- Catfight
- List of American films of 1957
