= Jail Bait (1954 film) =

1954 film by Ed Wood

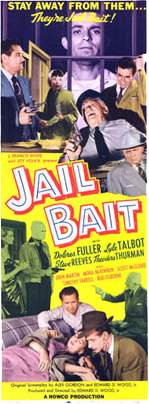
- Theatrical release poster
- Directed by: Ed Wood
- Written by: Alex Gordon; Ed Wood
- Produced by: Ed Wood; Joy Newton Houck Sr. J. Francis White
- Starring: Timothy Farrell; Dolores Fuller; Clancy Malone; Herbert Rawlinson; Steve Reeves; Lyle Talbot
- Cinematography: William C. Thompson
- Edited by: Charles Clement; Igo Kantor
- Music by: Hoyt Kurtain
- Production company: Howco Productions
- Distributed by: Howco Productions
- Release date: May 12, 1954
- Running time: 71 minutes
- Country: United States
- Language: English
- Budget: US$22,000 (adjusted for inflation: $263,755)

Jail Bait (working title was The Hidden Face) is a 1954 American film noir directed by Ed Wood, with a screenplay by Wood and Alex Gordon. The film stars Clancy Malone as the delinquent son of a famous doctor, and his involvement with a dangerous criminal. Famed bodybuilder Steve Reeves made his first major screen appearance in the film, and it was one of the few films he made using his own voice (most of the films he made thereafter in Italy were dubbed in post production using other actors' voices). The film belongs to the film noir genre, and contains themes typical of it such as plastic surgery and identity theft.

== Plot ==
At a police station, Marilyn Gregor meets Inspector Johns and Lieutenant Bob Lawrence, as her brother Don Gregor had been arrested for carrying an unlicensed handgun. After she posts bail for him, he is released, but the police refuse Don's request to return his handgun. Johns suspects the young man is an associate of gangster Vic Brady.

The Gregor siblings return home, where Don opens a book and retrieves a hidden revolver. As he prepares to leave, Don has a chance encounter with his father Dr. Boris Gregor, a famous plastic surgeon, at the front door. Boris then heads for the book safe and discovers that the revolver is missing.

The scene shifts to a bar, where Don and Brady meet, and Don receives his share of the money for his role in a recent robbery. Brady then reminds his partner that they are going to rob the payroll of the Monterey Theatre, although Don has his doubts about the plan. Brady and Don break into the theater and ambush the nightwatchman, who is forced at gunpoint to open the safe but they are disturbed by Miss Willis, a bookkeeper who is leaving for the night, and Don shoots and kills the nightwatchman, while Brady shoots the fleeing woman in the back. Afterwards, Brady collects their loot while Don seems to be in shock over his own actions. The two criminals flee while police sirens are heard approaching the theatre. The two manage to escape the police, while at the theater it turns out that Miss Willis has survived the shooting, and she later identifies Don as the killer of the nightwatchman.

Brady leads Don to the residence of his girlfriend, Loretta. Don leaves unnoticed, and Brady decides to search for him. The following night, Don visits his father's office and confesses the murder to him; Boris urges his son to surrender to the police. The guilt-ridden Don agrees to do so eventually and his father helps him escape the arriving police. While fleeing, Don is captured by Brady, who drives him back to Loretta's residence. They hear on the radio that they are both suspects for the robbery, although Don is wanted for murder. Don repeatedly expresses his decision to surrender and face the consequences of his actions. Fearing for his own safety, Brady kills his partner. He temporarily stores the corpse behind a curtain in the kitchen.

At this point, Brady conceives a plan to elude the police by undergoing plastic surgery, and he contacts Boris, claiming that he is holding Don hostage until plastic surgery is completed. Boris decides to have Marilyn assist him, since she is a trained nurse.

A few days later, Brady, Boris, Loretta, and Marilyn gather in preparation of the operation. Brady expresses his distrust of the Gregors and has to be convinced that anesthesia is necessary. With Brady sedated, Boris searches Loretta's kitchen for a water basin. He finds it, but also finds Don's stored corpse. He keeps this a secret and maintains a facade of calmness while performing the operation. He claims that the bandages covering Brady's face have to stay on for two weeks.

Two weeks later, Brady and Loretta arrive at the Gregor residence on schedule, but so do Johns and Lawrence, who were both summoned by Boris. They want to know who the bandaged man is. When Brady's bandages are removed, his new face is revealed to be that of Don. Besides Boris, everyone else considers him to be the wanted murderer, and Boris claims that the man is his son. A horrified Brady attempts to flee and is killed in a shootout with the police. His dying body falls into a swimming pool.

== Cast ==
- Lyle Talbot as Inspector Johns
- Steve Reeves as Lieutenant Bob Lawrence, Johns's associate
- Herbert Rawlinson as Dr. Boris Gregor, a successful plastic surgeon and father of Don and Marilyn
- Clancy Malone as Don Gregor, Dr. Gregor's son and an associate of gangster Vic Brady
- Dolores Fuller as Marilyn Gregor, Dr. Gregor's daughter and Don's sister
- Timothy Farrell as Vic Brady, a gangster
- Theodora Thurman as Loretta, Brady's mistress
- Bud Osborne as Paul McKenna, a Night Watchman in a theater
- Mona McKinnon as Miss Willis, a bookkeeper in a theater
- La Vada Simmons as Miss Lytell, Dr. Gregor's receptionist
- Regina Claire as a Newspaper Reporter
- John Robert Martin as Detective McCall
- Don Nagel as Detective Dennis
- John Avery as a Police Doctor

== Production notes ==
Jail Bait is set in Southern California, though this does not translate to the abundance of sunlight which is typically associated with the location. The action of the film takes place over several weeks, but "always at night". This perpetual night and darkness gives the film an "otherworldly ambience".

The script of the film was co-written by Ed Wood and Alex Gordon. The narrative of the film has a tighter structure and a more coherent storyline than Wood's other known films, elements which Rob Craig suggests were the contributions of Gordon to the story. The music of the film was composed by Hoyt Curtin and previously used in the film Mesa of Lost Women (1953). The repetitious and nearly continuous soundtrack makes use of a flamenco guitar and a piano, with their sounds combined in what seems to be a free jazz composition. Craig sees the music as failing to add to the suspense of the film, instead giving the scenes using it a dream-like quality.

The film was produced by Howco, a production company co-owned by Joy Newton Houck Sr. and J. Francis White. They were also the owners of their own chain of movie theaters in the Southern United States. According to the recollections of George Weiss, the producers took advantage of Wood. In exchange for the film's modest budget, Wood agreed to quit any demands on the film's box office earnings.

Clancy Malone was actually a delivery boy for a grocery store before he expressed interest to Wood about becoming an actor. As such, this was his first and only role. The role of Dr. Gregor was originally intended for Bela Lugosi, but went to Herbert Rawlinson instead. Like Lugosi, Herbert Rawlinson was a seasoned actor who had seen better days. He was a leading man of the silent film and his career had lasted for about 40 years. Jail Bait was his swan song, as Rawlinson died from lung cancer the night after the film completed shooting. This was also famed model and radio star Theodora Thurman's only motion picture credit, as she entered a career in radio soon after the film was made.

The performance of Cotton Watts in some film prints was not filmed by Wood. The production company used film footage from one of Watts' stage shows to lengthen the film's running time. Watts was a white actor who performed in blackface at the nightclubs of Panama City Beach, Florida from 1947 to 1959. He was one of the last notable performers in the genre, as its popularity had declined following World War II and the Civil Rights Movement opposed attempts at revival. The inclusion of the footage in this film probably reflects the sensibilities of the intended audience. Jail Bait was primarily released in areas of the Deep South, where blackface still held a nostalgic appeal. The footage was previously used in the film Yes Sir, Mr. Bones (1951).

== Analysis ==
The role of Marilyn as the protective sister to the troubled young man is somewhat unusual. In the B movies of the 1950s, it was not unusual for a female character to express concern over her male counterpart. But said female typically was the romantic interest of the protagonist, not his sister. Craig finds that Marilyn takes on the role of Don's wife, without any actual sexual tension between the siblings.

The absence of a loving mother figure is said to be at the root of Don's problematic behavior. This is reminiscent of Glen or Glenda (1953), where Glen and his mother did not have a loving relationship and this was stated to be at the root of his problems. In both cases, the scripts emphasize the importance of a mother to a nuclear family.

Don Gregor is one of Wood's typical sympathetic characters, a relatively decent man with a bad habit. The story follows the template of a tragedy.

== Reception ==
The film holds a "rotten" 29% rating at the film review aggregator website Rotten Tomatoes, receiving two positive reviews out of seven, not enough for a consensus. Film critic Dennis Schwartz gave the film a C rating, citing its poor acting and script, but stating it has a "complete and understandable story" that makes it Wood's best film ever, without as much unintentional humor as his other films.

== See also ==
- Ed Wood filmography

== Bibliography ==
- Craig, Rob (2009), "Jail Bait (1954)", Ed Wood, Mad Genius: A Critical Study of the Films, McFarland & Company, ISBN 978-0-7864-5423-5
- Craig, Rob (2009), "Notes", Ed Wood, Mad Genius: A Critical Study of the Films, McFarland & Company, ISBN 978-0-7864-5423-5
- Killer Joe (2011), a film by William Friedkin
- Rudolph Grey, Nightmare of Ecstasy: The Life and Art of Edward D. Wood, Jr. (1992) ISBN 978-0-922915-24-8
- Park, William (2011), "Appendix A:Within the Genre", What is Film Noir?, Bucknell University Press, ISBN 978-1-6114-8363-5
- The Haunted World of Edward D. Wood, Jr. (1996), documentary film directed by Brett Thompson
