= The Cape Canaveral Monsters =

1960 film

- Directed by: Phil Tucker
- Written by: Phil Tucker
- Produced by: Richard Greer
- Starring: Jason Johnson; Katherine Victor; Scott Powers; Linda Connell
- Cinematography: W. Merle Connell
- Edited by: Richard Greer
- Music by: Gene Kauer
- Production company: CCW Productions
- Release date: 1960
- Running time: 68 Minutes
- Country: United States
- Language: English

The Cape Canaveral Monsters is a 1960 independent American black-and-white science-fiction film, produced by Lionel Dichter and Richard Greer, and written and directed by Phil Tucker. It stars Katherine Victor, Jason Johnson, Scott Peters and Linda Connell, Though planned as a theatrical feature, it was ultimately released directly to television. The movies deals with two extraterrestrials who have come to earth to "transmit" healthy, living humans, especially women, back to their home planet and to disrupt rockets launched from Cape Canaveral. It was made shortly before the start of the USA's crewed space program and has been categorized by a reviewer as a later entry in the "reds-under-the-beds," fear-of-communism films that were often part of sci-fi during the 1950s.

== Plot ==
Two mysterious white circles move about on a solid black background. As they move, a woman's voice says they must obtain human bodies to carry out their mission.

Meanwhile, a man and woman leave a beach near Cape Canaveral, Florida. The circles descend on them, causing their car to crash. Both are killed. But their bodies jerk back to life as they are taken over by the white circles, which are actually extraterrestrials. The woman's face is badly cut from smashing into the windshield and the man's left arm has been torn off. When they exit the wrecked car, the male alien, Hauron, leaves his severed arm behind. The woman alien, Nadja, retrieves it and tells him that she will sew it back on at the laboratory, in an artificial cave they have built as their headquarters.

When Hauron reconnoiters Cape Canaveral one night, an MP's guard dogs attack him and tear off his recently reattached arm. Nonetheless, he uses his "disruptor ray" to shoot down the rockets as soon as they are launched. The rocket scientists, who do not know about the extraterrestrials, work diligently to try to understand why their rockets are exploding.

Meanwhile, Tom Wright and Sally Markham, who both work at the launch site, go on a double-date with their friends Bob and Shirley. Tom says that the static coming in over a transistor radio means that an illegal transmitter is operating nearby and theorizes that it may have something to do with the launch failures. He and Sally search for the transmitter but are unable to find it.

The four go back another night to look again, but while Tom and Sally are searching, Bob and Shirley are kidnapped by Hauron and Nadja. Bob dies during his capture, so Nadja removes his arm and grafts it onto Hauron. She says Bob had a handsome chin and replaces Hauron's scarred chin with it. Shirley and Bob are both transmitted to the aliens' planet, even though Bob is dead and the aliens have been admonished about sending dead or otherwise damaged specimens.

Not knowing that Shirley and Bob have already been transmitted, Tom and Sally find the cave and are captured. They are kept intact, although held in place by an electronic device. Tom frees himself after discovering he can disable the device by waving his wristwatch's radium dial at it. He goes for help, but leaves Sally behind, forcing him to return because she is still a captive.

Help arrives in the form of sheriff's deputies, Army personnel and rocket scientists. They demand that Nadja and Hauron surrender themselves, but they're captured en masse. Hauron and Nadja incapacitate them, then revert to circle form to transmit themselves home. But before they are able to, the captives awaken. Tom, and Sally's father, the head rocket scientist, concoct a method to prevent the extraterrestrials from transmitting themselves. The humans escape from the cave just before a powerful explosion destroys it. They congratulate each other because Sally and Tom have been rescued and now the space program is safe.

But just as it appears that all is well, Sally and the chief deputy get into his patrol car. As they drive out of there, the tires screech, there are sounds of a crash and Sally screams.

== Cast ==
The credits at the end of the film list the cast in the following order of appearance:

- Jason Johnson as Hauron
- Katherine Victor as Nadja
- Harriet Dichter as Woman Scientist
- Chuck Howard as Maj. Gen. Hollister
- Bill Vess as Capt. Martin
- Joe Chester as Dr. Meister
- Gary Travis as Bob Hardin
- Billy Greene as Dr. Heinrich von Hofften
- Scott Peters as Tom Wright
- Linda Connell as Sally Markham
- Tom Allen as Cpl. Williams
- Tony Soler as Newsboy
- Thelaine Williams as Shirley
- Brian F. Wood as Elmer Wesson
- Flori Jo Johnson as Police Dispatcher
- Lyle Felisse as Chief Deputy
- Matt Shaw as Deputy
- David King as Detective Allen

== Production ==
The film was shot in Griffith Park and Bronson Caves in Los Angeles and on a beach in Malibu, California, although it was set in and around Cape Canaveral, Florida. Griffith Park and Bronson Caves were the same locations used by Tucker for his first sci-fi movie, Robot Monster, in 1953.

The Cape Canaveral Monsters was apparently the only movie in which Linda Connell, the daughter of the film's cinematographer, W. Merle Connell, appeared. Likewise, Harriet Dichter seems to have had no other film or television roles. Despite the similarity of last name, it is not known if Harriet Dichter, credited as "Woman Scientist", is or was related to Lionel Dichter, the film's executive producer. It appears to have been the only film Lionel Dichter produced.

According to Katherine Victor, the movie was to be filmed in color on a two-week shooting schedule, with financing provided by "group of dentists or doctors". Victor recalled being paid $420 or $450 for her role. However, the movie ended up being shot in black-and-white and in single takes because of budget cuts.

The movie was apparently intended to be distributed through states' rights film distributors. However, film historian Bill Warren notes that while the film was "offered" to theaters, it "may not have been released theatrically," despite being listed by gross magazine as being "available in 1960".

The Cape Canaveral Monsters was sold to television in early 1964 by the distribution company M and A Alexander. It was part of the "Chiller Science Fiction Package" of four movies. The other three were Flight of the Lost Balloon (1961), The Hideous Sun Demon (1959) and The Monster of Piedras Blancas (1961).

== Soundtrack ==
Four songs played during The Cape Canaveral Monsters can be heard coming from the characters' transistor radio. The songs are listed in the opening credits as "Please Somebody," written by Jerry Coates and performed by Terry Miller; "Love is the Thing," written by John Nieel Jr. and performed by Skip Shane; and "Think of Me" and "I'll Find a Way," written by Morey Bernstein and performed by Jerry Savoy. "Please Somebody" was released in February 1960 on Lute Records (no. L-5903) as the B-side of a 45 rpm single by Terry Miller, with "I'm Available" on the A-side.

== Reception ==
No reviews from the time the movie was completed are known to exist.

In 1995, British critic Phil Hardy called The Cape Canaveral Monsters a "belated entry in the reds under the bed cycle of films, which started at the beginning of the Cold War, when the fear of communist "subversion from within became a prevalent force" in the USA. The notion in science fiction is exemplified by such movies as Invasion of the Body Snatchers, which Hardy called a "classic example of an anti-communist film of the period for its handling of the take-over from within theme," although "it is far better and far more complex than such crude reductions suggest." The "anxiety and paranoia" that "marched hand in hand" during the 1950s was reflected in reds-under-the-bed films and events in real life. "Early fifties paranoia tended to link Russians and flying saucers and numerous UFO sightings were imagined to be Russian spy ships or, worse, carrying Russian weapons."

Warren called the film a "stilted, limited disaster", although he added that "Tucker seemed to be sincere in his efforts to make it a good low-budget film." Kay Glenn wrote, "Though not as ineptly made as Robot Monster, this is all cut-rate stuff, full of plot holes, bad acting, and a few unintentional laughs thanks to the aliens, who bicker like a married couple." Bryan Senn dismissed the film as "an obscure curio in the '60s horror/cinematic cabinet, neither good enough nor bad enough to really stand out."

Several authors have noted that the movie has sexual and gender undertones. Nadja and Hauron "seem to enjoy an active sex life, probably a first for invading aliens." After a hard day's work, "'Let's get some rest,' Hauron suggests, lifting [Nadja's] head with a finger," writes Warren. Bruce Eder says that a greater emphasis on the extraterrestrial's "strange focus on the lusty side of being human" might have "made for a more interesting movie." David Elroy Goldweber notes that the film "verges on the prurient or perverse in its treatment of helpless Earthwomen (in bondage, undressed, and generally useless)", comparing it to Tucker's Robot Monster.
