= Joanne Arnold =

American actress and model (born 1931)

Playboy centerfold appearance
- May 1954
- Preceded by: Marilyn Waltz
- Succeeded by: Margie Harrison

Personal details
- Born: April 1, 1931 (age 94) Fullerton, California, U.S.
- Height: 5 ft 5 in (1.65 m)

Joanne Arnold (born April 1, 1931) is an American actress and model. She was Playboy magazine's Playmate of the Month for the May 1954 issue. She also appeared on the covers of the March 1954 and August 1955 issues. As of 2025, Arnold lives in a retirement community in Washington.

== Filmography ==
- Invasion of the Star Creatures (1962) (as Gloria Victor) .... Dr. Puna
- Son of Sinbad (1955) (uncredited) .... Raider
- The Adventures of Hajji Baba (1954) (as Joann Arnold) .... Susu
- Girl Gang (1954) .... June
- Marry Me Again (1953) .... W.A.C.
- The Caddy (1953) (uncredited) .... Bathing Beauty
- I Love Melvin (1953) (uncredited) .... Chorine
- Stop, You're Killing Me (1952) (uncredited) .... Party Girl
- You for Me (1952) (uncredited) .... Nurse
- Just This Once (1952) (uncredited) .... Eleanor
- Ten Tall Men (1951) (uncredited) .... Lady in Waiting

== See also ==
- List of people in Playboy 1954–59

Margie Harrison	Margaret Scott	Dolores Del Monte	Marilyn Waltz	Joanne Arnold	Margie Harrison
Neva Gilbert	Arline Hunter	Jackie Rainbow	Madeline Castle	Diane Hunter	Terry Ryan
