= Girl Gang =

- Film poster
- Directed by: Robert C. Dertano
- Written by: Robert C. Dertano; George Weiss
- Produced by: George Weiss
- Starring: Joanne Arnold; Timothy Farrell
- Cinematography: William C. Thompson
- Production company: Broadway Roadshow Productions
- Distributed by: Screen Classics
- Release date: 1954
- Running time: 63 mins
- Country: United States
- Language: English

Girl Gang is an American crime film, co-written, edited and directed by Robert C. Dertano and co-written and produced under the personal supervision of George Weiss. The film starred Joanne Arnold and Timothy Farrell and was released in 1954.

== Plot ==
Joe (Timothy Farrell) controls a gang of young girls who commit robberies and prostitution for him by getting them hooked on drugs.

== Cast ==
- Joanne Arnold as June
- Timothy Farrell as Joe the Big Boss
- Harry Keaton as Doc Bradford (as Harry Keatan)
- Lou Monson as Jack the Mechanic
- Mary Lou O'Connor as Wanda Johnson
- Mildred Kalke as Daisy, Joe's Girlfriend
- Norman Stanley as Brown, June's Employer
- Thelma Montgomery as Gang Girl
- Bernard Carroll
- Ray Morton
- Marie Metier as Gang Girl
- Irene Gilmore as Gang Girl
- Peggy Winters as Gang Girl

=== Rest of cast listed alphabetically ===
- Miliza Milo as Woman Calling the Police (uncredited)

=== Produced by ===
- George Weiss

=== Supervising producer Cinematography by ===
- William C. Thompson - director of photography Film Editing by
- Robert C. Dertano - (as Bob Derteno) Set Decoration by
- James R. Connell (uncredited) Art Department
- James R. Connell set designer Sound Department
- Dale Knight - sound recordist Special Effects by
- Ray Mercer - special effects Camera and Electrical Department
- Bert Shipman - camera operator (as Bert Shippan) Crew verified as complete
