= Jimmy Lennon Jr. =

American boxing announcer

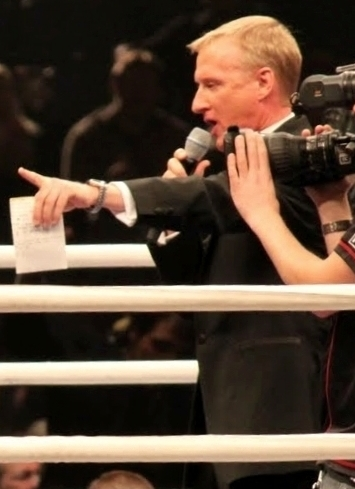
Lennon introducing Carl Froch during the Super Six World Boxing Classic at Hartwall Arena in Helsinki in November 2010.

James Frederick "Jimmy" Lennon Jr. (born August 5, 1958) is an American boxing ring announcer who was employed primarily by Showtime and Fox Sports as ring announcer for their Showtime Championship Boxing and Premier Boxing Champions, also by Bob Arum's Top Rank on ESPN events. Lennon was also employed by Fox Sports when it previously had rights to professional boxing and was the ring announcer for Don King Promotions' fights that aired on various networks. He is best known for his catchphrase, "It's showtime!" but the catchphrase was not spoken during Fox's fight coverage.

== Announcing career ==
Born in Santa Monica, California, Lennon has been a ring announcer for over 40 years, during which he has been at the microphone for some historic fights, including Mike Tyson vs. Evander Holyfield, Winky Wright vs. Félix Trinidad and Floyd Mayweather Jr. vs. Manny Pacquiao. He followed in the footsteps of his father Jimmy Lennon who was a ring announcer as well. He also announced MMA fight cards for Strikeforce, both the regular MMA shows which aired on CBS and Showtime and Strikeforce's SHO XC shows which aired on Showtime. He formerly announced fights for the now-defunct Elite XC mixed martial arts promotion, and also for the K-1 promotion in Japan.

He occasionally subbed for Michael Buffer on HBO World Championship Boxing and even Buffer subbed for Lennon on Showtime Championship Boxing.

Lennon began doing ring introductions with PBC promotions in January 2019.

Lennon, much like his father, speaks Spanish and makes an effort to pronounce all fighters' names correctly.

Lennon has also done work for EA Sports, having been the ring announcer for its Knockout Kings series of boxing video games and its EA Sports MMA game within Strikeforce rules.

== Movies ==
He has appeared as himself in several movies, most notably Hot Shots!, Southpaw, and Creed III.

== Honors ==
Lennon has been inducted into the World Boxing Hall of Fame. He was also selected as an inductee into the International Boxing Hall of Fame in 2013.

== See also ==
- Chuck Hull
- Michael Buffer
