= Ed Wood (film) =

1994 film by Tim Burton

- Theatrical release poster
- Directed by: Tim Burton
- Written by: Scott Alexander; Larry Karaszewski
- Based on: Nightmare of Ecstasy: The Life and Art of Edward D. Wood Jr. by Rudolph Grey
- Produced by: Denise Di Novi; Tim Burton
- Starring: Johnny Depp; Martin Landau; Sarah Jessica Parker; Patricia Arquette; Jeffrey Jones; Bill Murray
- Cinematography: Stefan Czapsky
- Edited by: Chris Lebenzon
- Music by: Howard Shore
- Production companies: Touchstone Pictures; Tim Burton Productions; Di Novi Pictures
- Distributed by: Buena Vista Pictures Distribution
- Release dates: September 24, 1994 (New York Film Festival); September 30, 1994 (United States)
- Running time: 126 minutes
- Country: United States
- Language: English
- Budget: $18 million
- Box office: $13.8 million

Ed Wood is a 1994 American biographical film directed and produced by Tim Burton and starring Johnny Depp as the eponymous cult filmmaker. The film concerns the period in Wood's life when he made his best-known films as well as his relationship with actor Bela Lugosi, played by Martin Landau. Sarah Jessica Parker, Patricia Arquette, Jeffrey Jones, Lisa Marie, and Bill Murray are among the supporting cast.

The film was conceived by writers Scott Alexander and Larry Karaszewski. Alexander first proposed it as a documentary, when he was a student at the USC School of Cinematic Arts. Years later, irritated at being thought of solely as writers for family films with their work on Problem Child (1990) and its 1991 sequel, Alexander and Karaszewski struck a deal with Burton and Denise Di Novi to produce Ed Wood. Initially, Michael Lehmann was chosen to direct the project, but due to scheduling conflicts with his work on the film Airheads (1994), he had to vacate the director's position, which was taken over by Tim Burton.

Ed Wood was originally in development at Columbia Pictures, but the studio put the film in "turnaround" over Burton's decision to shoot in black-and-white. Ed Wood was taken to Walt Disney Studios, which produced the film through its Touchstone Pictures banner. The film proved financially unsuccessful, returning only $13.8 million against an $18 million budget, but was met with critical acclaim upon release, with particular praise for Depp and Landau's performances and the makeup, and won two Academy Awards: Best Supporting Actor for Landau and Best Makeup for Rick Baker (who designed Landau's prosthetic makeup), Ve Neill and Yolanda Toussieng. The film is now considered to be a cult classic and one of Burton's best works.

== Plot ==
In 1952, aspiring writer and director Ed Wood is struggling to break into the film industry. After learning that producer George Weiss is trying to purchase Christine Jorgensen's life story, Ed meets with Weiss to direct a now fictionalized film titled I Changed My Sex! but is rejected. Ed then meets his longtime idol, horror film actor Bela Lugosi, whom he befriends. Ed persuades Weiss to let him direct by arguing that having a star in the film would sell tickets, and they could sign the financially struggling Lugosi for a low price. Ed shows the film's completed script to his girlfriend, Dolores Fuller, and reveals that he is secretly a transvestite (having worn women's clothing for personal comfort since childhood), but Fuller struggles to accept this.

During production for Glen or Glenda, which is now about a transvestite, Ed takes to film production with an unusual approach, shooting only one take per scene, giving actors little direction, and using stock footage to fill in gaps. The film is released to critical and commercial failure, preventing Ed from getting work at Weiss' Screen Classics or making a partnership with Warner Bros. executive Feldman. On the advice of Fuller, Ed decides to finance his next film, Bride of the Atom, independently. He befriends Tor Johnson after a wrestling match and casts him, while also becoming friends with famous psychic The Amazing Criswell, who advises Ed on how to sell himself better. Meanwhile, Ed discovers that Lugosi has developed a morphine addiction.

Following a failed fundraising dinner at the Brown Derby, Ed meets Loretta King, whom he mistakes for a wealthy heiress; he asks her to fund the film and casts her as the lead instead of Fuller, who is relegated to a smaller role, infuriating her. Filming begins but is halted when it is revealed that Loretta is actually poor, so Ed convinces meat-packing industry tycoon Don McCoy to continue funding the film, who agrees as long as his son is cast as the lead. At the wrap party for the film, now retitled Bride of the Monster, Fuller breaks up with Ed due to his cross-dressing and the poor quality of his films.

After the government cuts off Lugosi's unemployment benefits, he checks himself into rehab to cure his drug addiction, and Ed meets Kathy O'Hara, who is visiting her father there. He takes her on a date and reveals his transvestism to her, which she accepts, and they begin a relationship. After Lugosi is checked out of rehab, he and Ed shoot scenes for a new film outside his home. Ed and company—including TV horror host Vampira—later attend the premiere of Bride of the Monster, where an angry mob chases them out of the theater.

Lugosi dies, leaving Ed without a star. After learning that his landlord's church is struggling to produce a series of religious films about the Twelve Apostles, Ed convinces him to have his church fund his script for a science fiction film, Grave Robbers from Outer Space, which could result in a box-office success and generate enough money for the landlord's dream project. Ed hires Vampira, Tor, Criswell, and Kathy's chiropractor Dr. Tom Mason to star in the film (the latter being a stand-in for Lugosi), and he and all his friends partake in a baptism ceremony at the church.

During filming, Ed clashes with the Baptists over the title, script content, and Ed's B movie directing style, eventually renaming the film Plan 9 from Outer Space. Frustrated, Ed goes to the nearest bar, where he encounters filmmaker Orson Welles who, struggling with similar issues while working on Don Quixote, encourages Ed to assert his artistic vision, and cites Citizen Kane as the project where he had complete creative control. Filming concludes with Ed defying his producers' wishes.

At the premiere of Plan 9 from Outer Space, Ed dedicates the film to Lugosi, and as the film plays, he quietly tells himself, "This is the one I'll be remembered for." Afterwards, Ed and Kathy head to Las Vegas to get married. A textual epilogue reveals that Ed failed to achieve mainstream success in Hollywood before his death in 1978, and was posthumously named "Worst Director of All Time", though that honor eventually earned him worldwide acclaim and a new generation of fans.

== Cast ==
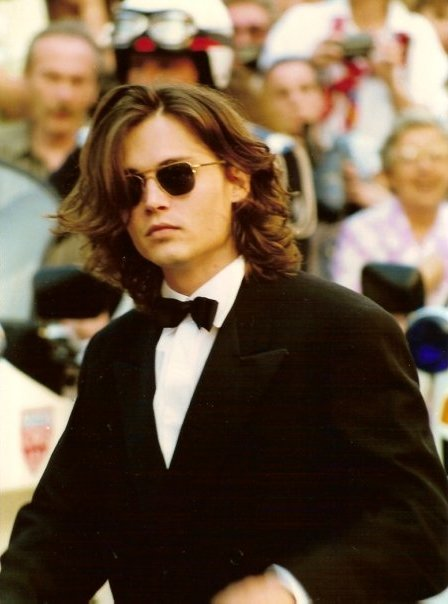
Johnny Depp (pictured in 1992) plays Ed Wood.

- Johnny Depp as Ed Wood: Burton approached Depp and "within 10 minutes of hearing about the project, I was committed," the actor remembers. At the time, Depp was depressed about films and filmmaking. By accepting this part, it gave him a "chance to stretch out and have some fun" and working with Martin Landau "rejuvenated my love for acting". Depp was already familiar with some of Wood's films through John Waters, who had shown him Plan 9 from Outer Space and Glen or Glenda. To get a handle on how to portray Wood, Depp studied the performance of Jack Haley as the Tin Man in The Wizard of Oz, and the acting of Mickey Rooney, Ronald Reagan and Casey Kasem. He watched several Reagan speeches because the actor felt that "he had a kind of blind optimism that was perfect for Ed Wood." Depp also borrowed some of Kasem's cadence and "that utterly confident, breezy salesman quality in his voice".
- Martin Landau as Bela Lugosi: An old popular horror film actor whom Ed helps. Rick Baker created Landau's prosthetic makeup. Baker did not use extensive make-up appliances, only enough to resemble Lugosi and allow Landau to use his face to act and express emotion, which consisted of a set of ears, nose, chin, and an appliance that covered his upper lip. For research, Landau watched 25 of Lugosi's films and seven interviews between 1931 and 1956. Landau did not want to deliver an over-the-top performance: "Lugosi was theatrical, but I never wanted the audience to feel I was an actor chewing the scenery... I felt it had to be Lugosi's theatricality, not mine."
- Sarah Jessica Parker as Dolores Fuller: Ed's girlfriend before his relationship with Kathy. Dolores is embarrassed by Ed's transvestism, which leads to their breakup. Dolores later becomes a successful songwriter for Elvis Presley.
- Patricia Arquette as Kathy O'Hara: Ed's girlfriend after his relationship with Dolores. Kathy does not have a problem with Ed's transvestism, and eventually marries Ed. Their marriage lasts until Ed's death in 1978. She never remarried. Arquette met her real-life counterpart during filming. The actress found her to be "very graceful and very nice".
- Jeffrey Jones as The Amazing Criswell: A local psychic TV entertainer. Criswell helps Ed with usual production duties, finding investors and acting in Ed's films.
- G. D. Spradlin as Reverend Lemon: a Baptist minister who funds Plan 9 from Outer Space.
- Vincent D'Onofrio as Orson Welles: Appears in a cameo late in the film. Maurice LaMarche provided Welles' voice in an uncredited performance.
- Lisa Marie as Maila Nurmi / Vampira: Hostess of the local Vampira Show. She is dismissive of Ed at first but agrees to join the cast of Plan 9 from Outer Space, on the condition that she has no lines.
- Bill Murray as John "Bunny" Breckinridge: Ed's drag queen friend who helps him with Plan 9 from Outer Space.
- Mike Starr as George Weiss: Short-tempered and foul-mouthed Z movie producer, known for his work on exploitation films. Weiss hires Ed to direct Glen or Glenda. He threatens to kill Ed over the phone following Glen or Glenda's critical and commercial failure.
- Max Casella and Brent Hinkley as Paul Marco and Conrad Brooks: Two of Ed's all-around production assistants and frequent actors. Paul is hired to find the Lugosi stand-in for Plan 9 from Outer Space, while Conrad accidentally has a brief dispute with Lugosi during Glen or Glenda.
- Juliet Landau as Loretta King: King replaces Dolores in Bride of the Monster after Wood mistakes her for an heiress able to front the money for the production costs.
- George "The Animal" Steele as Tor Johnson: A Swedish professional wrestler hired by Wood to be in two of his films, Bride of the Monster and Plan 9.
- Ned Bellamy as Dr. Tom Mason: Kathy's chiropractor who is chosen to be Lugosi's stand-in for Plan 9.
- Stanley DeSantis as Mr. Feldman: an executive at Warner Bros., to whom Ed shows the first cut of Glen or Glenda in an attempt to make films for Warner Bros.; he later tells Ed over the phone that it is the worst picture he has ever seen.
- Rance Howard as Old Man McCoy: a meat-packing tycoon, who agrees to fund Ed's next picture, Bride of the Monster, in exchange for his son Tony being the leading man and the film ending with an explosion.
- Korla Pandit, credited as "Indian musician", essentially appears as himself; like he originally did on his 1950s TV program, Pandit plays organ and does not speak in this cameo.

The film also includes cameos from actors who worked with Wood on Plan 9 from Outer Space, Conrad Brooks (as a bartender) and Gregory Walcott (as a potential backer).

== Production ==
Writers Scott Alexander and Larry Karaszewski conceived the idea for a biopic of Ed Wood when they were students at the USC School of Cinematic Arts. Alexander even proposed making a documentary about Wood, The Man in the Angora Sweater, in his sophomore year at USC. However, Karaszewski figured, "there would be no one on the planet Earth who would make this movie or want to make this movie, because these aren't the sort of movies that are made." Irritated at being thought of solely as writers for family films for their work on Problem Child and Problem Child 2, Alexander and Karaszewski wrote a 10-page film treatment for Ed Wood and pitched the idea to Heathers director Michael Lehmann, with whom they attended USC film school. The basis for their treatment came from Rudolph Grey's Nightmare of Ecstasy: The Life and Art of Edward D. Wood Jr., a full-length biography, which draws on interviews from Wood's family and colleagues. Lehmann presented their treatment to his producer on Heathers, Denise Di Novi. Di Novi had previously worked with Tim Burton on Edward Scissorhands, Batman Returns and The Nightmare Before Christmas, and a deal was struck with Lehmann as director and Burton and Di Novi producing.

Burton began reading Nightmare of Ecstasy and some of Wood's letters. He was taken by how he "wrote about his films as if he was making Citizen Kane, you know, whereas other people perceived them as, like, the worst movies ever". Burton admits to having always been a fan of Ed Wood, which contributed to the film being more sympathetic to Wood than another director might have been. The relationship between Wood and Lugosi in the script echoes closely Burton's relationship with his own idol and two-time colleague, Vincent Price. He said in an interview, "Meeting Vincent had an incredible impact on me, the same impact Ed must have felt meeting and working with his idol." Meanwhile, Burton had been asked to direct Mary Reilly for Columbia Pictures with Winona Ryder in the title role.

However, Burton dropped out of Mary Reilly over Columbia's decision to fast-track the film and their interest with Julia Roberts in the title role instead of Ryder. This prompted Burton to become interested in directing Ed Wood himself, on the understanding that it could be done quickly. Lehmann said, "Tim wanted to do this movie immediately and direct, but I was already committed to Airheads." Lehmann was given executive producer credit. Alexander and Karaszewski delivered a 147-page screenplay in six weeks. Burton read the first draft and immediately agreed to direct the film as it stood, without any changes or rewrites. Ed Wood gave Burton the opportunity to make a film that was more character-driven as opposed to style-driven. He said in an interview, "On a picture like this I find you don't need to storyboard. You're working mainly with actors, and there's no effects going on, so it's best to be more spontaneous."

Initially, Ed Wood was in development with Columbia, but when Burton decided he wanted to shoot the film in black-and-white, studio head Mark Canton would not agree to it unless Columbia was given a first-look deal. Burton said black-and-white was "right for the material and the movie, and this was a movie that had to be in black-and-white". He insisted on total creative control, and so in April 1993, a month before the original start date, Canton put Ed Wood into turnaround. The decision sparked interest from Warner Bros., Paramount Pictures, and 20th Century Fox in optioning the film rights, but Burton accepted an offer from Walt Disney Studios, who had previously produced The Nightmare Before Christmas. Similar to The Nightmare Before Christmas, Disney released Ed Wood under their Touchstone Pictures banner. With a budget of $18 million, Disney did not feel the film was that much of a risk, and granted Burton total creative autonomy. Burton also refused a salary, and was not paid for his work on Ed Wood. Principal photography began in August 1993, and lasted 72 days. Despite his previous six-film relationship with Danny Elfman, Burton chose Howard Shore to write the film score. Under the pressure of finishing the score for Batman Returns, Burton's relationship with Elfman became strained and Burton admitted he and Elfman experienced "creative differences" during The Nightmare Before Christmas.

The film was shot at various locations in and around the Los Angeles area.

== Historical accuracy ==
When describing the film's accuracy, Burton explained, "It's not like a completely hardcore realistic biopic. In doing a biopic you can't help but get inside the person's spirit a little bit, so for me, some of the film is trying to be through Ed a little bit. So it's got an overly optimistic quality to it." Burton acknowledged that he probably portrayed Wood and his crew in an exaggeratedly sympathetic way, stating he did not want to ridicule people who had already been ridiculed for a good deal of their life. Burton decided not to depict the darker side of Wood's life because his letters never alluded to this aspect and remained upbeat. To this end, Burton wanted to make the film through Wood's eyes. He said in an interview, "I've never seen anything like them, the kind of bad poetry and redundancy– saying in, like, five sentences what it would take most normal people one ... Yet still there is a sincerity to them that is very unusual, and I always found that somewhat touching; it gives them a surreal, weirdly heartfelt feeling."

According to Forrest Ackerman, Dolores Fuller, Richard Sheffield, and Lugosi's son Bela G., the film's portrayal of Lugosi is inaccurate: in real life, he never used profanity, owned small dogs, or slept in coffins. Additionally, contrary to what was presented in the film, Bela was not thrown by a comic's ad-libbing in a skit on a TV show involving Wood, but on another show years earlier before the two ever met.

Burton biographer Ken Hanke criticized the depiction of Dolores Fuller. "The real Fuller is a lively, savvy, humorous woman," Hanke said, "while Parker's performance presents her as a kind of sitcom moron for the first part of the film and a rather judgmental and wholly unpleasant character in her later scenes." During her years with Wood, Fuller had regular TV jobs on Queen for a Day and The Dinah Shore Show, which are not mentioned. Fuller criticized Parker's portrayal and Burton's direction, but still gave Ed Wood a positive review. "Despite the dramatic liberties, I think Tim Burton is fabulous. I wished they could have made it a deeper love story because we really loved each other. We strove to find investors together, I worked so hard to support Ed and I".

== Release ==
Ed Wood had its premiere at the 32nd New York Film Festival at Lincoln Center. The film was then shown shortly after at the 21st Telluride Film Festival and later at the 1995 Cannes Film Festival, where it was in competition for the Palme d'Or.

=== Home media ===
The DVD edition of Ed Wood initially had difficulty reaching store shelves in the United States and Canada due to unspecified legal issues. The initial release had a featurette on transvestites, not relating to the film or its actors in any way, which was removed from subsequent releases. An initial street date of August 13, 2002, was announced only to be postponed. A new date of February 3, 2003 was set, only for it to be recalled again without explanation, although some copies quickly found their way to collectors' venues such as eBay. The DVD was finally released on October 19, 2004. It was released on Blu-ray in September 2012.

== Reception ==
=== Box office ===
Ed Wood had its limited release on September 30, 1994. It went into wide release on October 7, 1994 (just three days before what would have been Wood's 70th birthday) in 623 theaters. The film grossed $1,903,768 in its opening weekend. The film went on to gross $5,887,457 in the United States and Canada and $13.8 million worldwide, less than the production budget of $18 million.

=== Critical response ===
On Rotten Tomatoes, Ed Wood holds an approval rating of 92% based on 73 reviews, with an average rating of 8/10. The website's critical consensus states, "Tim Burton and Johnny Depp team up to fête the life and work of cult hero Ed Wood, with typically strange and wonderful results." On Metacritic, the film has a weighted average score of 71 out of 100, based on 20 critics, indicating "generally favorable" reviews. Audiences polled by CinemaScore gave the film an average grade of "B+" on an A+ to F scale.

Roger Ebert gave a largely positive review: "What Burton has made is a film which celebrates Wood more than it mocks him, and which celebrates, too, the zany spirit of the 1950s exploitation films, in which a great title, a has-been star, and a lurid ad campaign were enough to get bookings for some of the oddest films ever made." Ebert and Gene Siskel gave the film "Two Thumbs Up" on Siskel and Ebert, with Siskel calling it "a tribute to creative passion and also to friendship" and "one of the year's very best".

Peter Travers of Rolling Stone praised Burton's decision to not make a direct satire or parody of Wood's life. "Ed Wood is Burton's most personal and provocative movie to date," he wrote. "Outrageously disjointed and just as outrageously entertaining, the picture stands as a successful outsider's tribute to a failed kindred spirit."

Janet Maslin, writing in The New York Times, thought Johnny Depp "proved" himself as an established "certified great actor". "Depp captures all the can-do optimism that kept Ed Wood going, thanks to an extremely funny ability to look at the silver lining of any cloud." Todd McCarthy from Variety called Ed Wood "a fanciful, sweet-tempered biopic about the man often described as the worst film director of all time. Always engaging to watch and often dazzling in its imagination and technique, [the] picture is also a bit distended, and lacking in weight at its center. The result is beguiling rather than thrilling."

Richard Corliss, writing in Time magazine, gave a negative review. "The script by Scott Alexander and Larry Karaszewski posits Wood as a classic American optimist, a Capraesque hero with little to be optimistic about since he was also a classic American loser. That's a fine start, but the film then marches in staid chronological order." Corliss continued, "One wonders why this Burton film is so dishwatery, why it lacks the cartoon zest and outsider ache of Beetlejuice, Edward Scissorhands or Batman Returns." Burton calls Ed Wood one of his best films he made.

=== Accolades ===
==== Year-end lists ====
- 1st – Dan Craft, The Pantagraph
- 3rd – Gene Siskel, Chicago Tribune
- 4th – Peter Travers, Rolling Stone
- 4th – Joan Vadeboncoeur, Syracuse Herald American
- 5th – National Board of Review
- 5th – Scott Schuldt, The Oklahoman
- 5th – Michael Mills, The Palm Beach Post
- 6th – Glenn Lovell, San Jose Mercury News
- 6th – David Elliott, The San Diego Union-Tribune
- 7th – Kevin Thomas, Los Angeles Times
- 7th – Robert Denerstein, Rocky Mountain News
- 7th – Christopher Sheid, The Munster Times
- Top 10 (listed alphabetically, not ranked) – Mike Clark, USA Today
- Top 10 (listed alphabetically, not ranked) – Mike Mayo, The Roanoke Times
- Top 10 (listed alphabetically, not ranked) – William Arnold, Seattle Post-Intelligencer
- Top 10 Runner-ups – Bob Ross, The Tampa Tribune
- Best "sleepers" (not ranked) – Dennis King, Tulsa World
- Top 10 runner-ups (not ranked) – Janet Maslin, The New York Times
- Honorable mention – Betsy Pickle, Knoxville News-Sentinel
- Honorable mention – George Meyer, The Ledger
- Honorable mention – Bob Carlton, The Birmingham News

==== Awards ====
Ed Wood was nominated for three Golden Globes: Best Musical or Comedy, Johnny Depp for Best Actor in a Musical or Comedy and Martin Landau for Best Supporting Actor. Landau won in his category, while Depp lost to Hugh Grant (for Four Weddings and a Funeral). Landau and Rick Baker won Academy Awards for their work on the film. Landau also won Best Supporting Actor at the first Screen Actors Guild Awards. Scott Alexander and Larry Karaszewski were nominated for Best Screenplay Written Directly for the Screen by the Writers Guild of America, which was a surprise as few predicted that it would be considered.

Award	Date of ceremony	Category	Recipient(s)	Result	Ref(s)
Academy Awards	March 27, 1995	Best Supporting Actor	Martin Landau	Won	
Academy Awards	March 27, 1995	Best Makeup	Rick Baker, Ve Neill, Yolanda Toussieng	Won	
American Comedy Awards	1995	Funniest Supporting Actor in a Motion Picture	Martin Landau	Won	
Belgian Syndicate of Cinema Critics	1995	Grand Prix	Ed Wood	Nominated	
Boston Society of Film Critics	December 18, 1994	Best Supporting Actor	Martin Landau	Won	
Boston Society of Film Critics	December 18, 1994	Best Cinematography	Stefan Czapsky	Won	
British Academy Film Awards	April 23, 1996	Best Supporting Actor	Martin Landau	Nominated	
British Academy Film Awards	April 23, 1996	Best Makeup	Rick Baker, Ve Neill, Yolanda Toussieng	Nominated	
Chicago Film Critics Association	1995	Best Supporting Actor	Martin Landau	Won	
Golden Globes	January 21, 1995	Best Motion Picture – Comedy or Musical	Ed Wood	Nominated	
Golden Globes	January 21, 1995	Best Actor – Comedy or Musical	Johnny Depp	Nominated	
Golden Globes	January 21, 1995	Best Supporting Actor	Martin Landau	Won	
London Film Critics' Circle	1996	Actor of the Year	Johnny Depp	Won	
Los Angeles Film Critics Association	December 10, 1994	Best Supporting Actor	Martin Landau	Won	
Los Angeles Film Critics Association	December 10, 1994	Best Cinematography	Stefan Czapsky	Won	
Los Angeles Film Critics Association	December 10, 1994	Best Music	Howard Shore	Won	
National Society of Film Critics	January 3, 1995	Best Supporting Actor	Martin Landau	Won	
National Society of Film Critics	January 3, 1995	Best Cinematography	Stefan Czapsky	Won	
New York Film Critics Circle	January 22, 1995	Best Supporting Actor	Martin Landau	Won	
New York Film Critics Circle	January 22, 1995	Best Cinematography	Stefan Czapsky	Won	
Saturn Awards	June 26, 1995	Best Actor	Martin Landau	Won	
Saturn Awards	June 26, 1995	Best Music	Howard Shore	Won	
Saturn Awards	June 26, 1995	Best Make-Up	Ve Neill and Rick Baker	Won	
Saturn Awards	June 26, 1995	Best Fantasy Film	Ed Wood	Nominated	
Saturn Awards	June 26, 1995	Best Writing	Scott Alexander and Larry Karaszewski	Nominated	
Writers Guild of America	March 19, 1995	Best Original Screenplay	Scott Alexander and Larry Karaszewski	Nominated	

== See also ==
- List of black-and-white films produced since 1966

== Bibliography ==
- French, Lawrence (October 1994). "Playing Bela Lugosi". Cinefantastique.
- Hanke, Ken (1999). "Ed Wood in Hollywood". Tim Burton: An Unauthorized Biography of the Filmmaker. Renaissance Books. ISBN 978-1580630467.
- Rhodes, Gary D.; Sheffield, Richard (2007). Bela Lugosi: Dreams and Nightmares. Collectables Press. ISBN 978-0977379811.
- Rhodes, Gary D.; Weaver, Tom (2015). Ed Wood's Bride of the Monster. BearManor Media. ISBN 978-1593938574.
- Rhodes, Gary D. (2006). Lugosi: His Life on Film, Stage, and in the Hearts of Horror Lovers. McFarland & Company. ISBN 978-0-78-642765-9.
- Salisbury, Mark, ed. (2006). "Cabin Boy and Ed Wood". Burton on Burton. Farrar, Straus and Giroux. ISBN 978-0-57-122926-0.
