= Jimmy Lennon =

American wrestling announcer

- Lennon (left) raising the hand of Pedro Morales
- Born: Jimmy Lennon Sr. April 13, 1913
- Died: April 20, 1992 (aged 79)
- Occupations: Boxing and professional wrestling ring announcer
- Spouse: Doris Lennon
- Children: 4; Including Jimmy Jr.

Jimmy Lennon Sr. (April 13, 1913 – April 20, 1992) was a ring announcer for boxing and professional wrestling matches.

== Early life ==
Lennon sang as a young boy in church and later formed a singing group, The Lennon Brothers, with his brothers in Venice, California. He also served the World War II effort by becoming a commissioned civil instructor as a butcher and cook. At age 17, Lennon was planning to go to college and become an English professor, but his father Herbert Lennon became ill and died at age 44. This left Jimmy and his 19-year-old brother John Henry to work and support the large surviving family. He worked at multiple jobs singing and performing at sports events, athletic, patriotic, and police events in and around Los Angeles.

== Announcing career ==
Lennon first became a ring announcer in Santa Monica, California at the Ocean Park Arena, while working there as the regular singer of "The Star-Spangled Banner". The regular ring announcer at the time was unavailable so the event coordinator asked Lennon if he would fill in as ring announcer. At the time Lennon was wearing a tuxedo, which he also wore for his first announcing job. His boss liked Lennon's performance so well, he hired Lennon as the regular fight announcer.

He was a stickler for details, a prime example being his painstaking effort to pronounce tongue-twisting names correctly. “A man is entitled to the dignity of his own name,” he once told the Los Angeles Times.

== Other media ==
Lennon appeared in 75 productions, including Raging Bull, Rocky III, Main Event, California Split, Tough Guys, Kid Galahad, The Munsters, and The Monkees. Lennon was the character of a Jakks Pacific action figure released in 2007, depicting his Rocky III appearance.

== Personal life ==
The second born of seven brothers, Jimmy was later the uncle of the Lennon Sisters vocal group on The Lawrence Welk Show. The popular singing sisters were the daughters of Bill Lennon, younger brother of Jimmy. Sadly, brother Bill was brutally gunned down in the parking lot of his place of employment, at the then Marina del Rey Golf Course, in August 1969. His deranged killer took his own life two months later.

== Death ==
After ten years of heart problems, Lennon was admitted to St. John's Hospital in Santa Monica, California, where he died in ER on April 20, 1992. Private funeral services were first attended by family and friends in Santa Monica, followed by a larger public open-casket service and burial. Lennon was survived by his wife, Doris, and four children: Scott, Robin Thomas, Kim Fitzgerald and Jimmy Jr., who is also a boxing ring announcer.

== Awards and accomplishments ==
- World Boxing Hall of Fame
  - Hall of Fame
- Wrestling Observer Newsletter
  - Wrestling Observer Newsletter Hall of Fame (Class of 1997)

== Selected filmography ==
- Killer McCoy (1947) - Ring Announcer (uncredited)
- State of the Union (1948) - Reporter (uncredited)
- Fighting Fools (1949) - Ring Announcer (uncredited)
- Alias the Champ (1949) - Ring Announcer
- Fighting Coast Guard (1951) - Announcer (uncredited)
- Iron Man (1951) - Announcer (uncredited)
- Racket Girls (1951) - Himself
- The Ring (1952) - Ring announcer Aragon fight (uncredited)
- Champ for a Day (1953) - Fight Announcer (uncredited)
- City of Bad Men (1953) - Fight Announcer (uncredited)
- World in My Corner (1956) - Ring Announcer
- Kid Galahad (1962) - Fight Announcer (uncredited)
- The Munsters (1964, S1, E8 "Herman The Great") - Ring Announcer
- Joe Frazier vs. Eddie Machen (1966) - Himself
- The Monkees (1967) – Ring Announcer in S1:E20, "Monkees in the Ring"
- Hammer (1972) - Announcer
- Let's Do It Again (1975) - Fight Announcer
- Train Ride to Hollywood (1975) - Himself
- The One and Only (1978) - Ring Announcer in New York (uncredited)
- Matilda (1978) - Ring announcer
- Movie Movie (1978) - The Announcer (segment "Dynamite Hands")
- The Main Event (1979) - Announcer
- Atlantic City (1980) - Himself
- Raging Bull (1980) - Ring Announcer - Second Robinson Fight and Dauthuille Fight
- Thomas Hearns vs. Pipino Cuevas (1980) - Himself
- Body and Soul (1981) - Ring Announcer
- Rocky III (1982) - Title Announcer
- Delta Pi (1984) - Ring Announcer
- Tough Guys (1986) - Himself

== See also ==
- Chuck Hull
- Michael Buffer
