= Dance Hall Racket =

1953 film by Phil Tucker

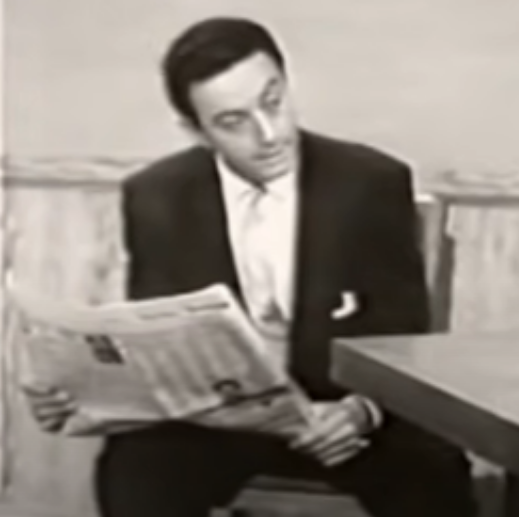
- Lenny Bruce as Vincent in a still from the film
- Directed by: Phil Tucker
- Screenplay by: Lenny Bruce
- Produced by: George Weiss
- Starring: Timothy Farrell; Lenny Bruce; Honey Harlow
- Cinematography: W. Merle Connell
- Edited by: Adrian Weiss
- Music by: Charles Ruddy
- Production company: Film Classics
- Distributed by: Screen Classics (United States, 1953, theatrical); Screen Classics (United States, 1956, re-release, theatrical); Something Weird Video (United States, 1994, David Friedman's Roadshow Rarities, Vol. 25, VHS)
- Release date: 1953
- Running time: 63 minutes
- Country: United States
- Language: English

Dance Hall Racket is a 1953 American low-budget noir crime drama film directed by Phil Tucker and starring Timothy Farrell. It was written by Lenny Bruce, who also stars in the film with his wife Honey Harlow.

== Plot summary ==
A gangster who operates a sleazy dance hall uses a sadistic bodyguard to keep his girls afraid and his customers in line. A merchant marine seaman is found murdered at the place and suspicion quickly falls upon the operator of a dime-a-dance honky tonk joint. A federal undercover agent is planted in the place to gather evidence, and he soon learns that the dive is only a cover-up for diamond-smuggling activities, and that one of the operation's henchmen, who is handy with a switch-blade knife, is the actual killer. Before they can be arrested, the henchman kills his boss and is shot while trying to escape.

== Cast ==
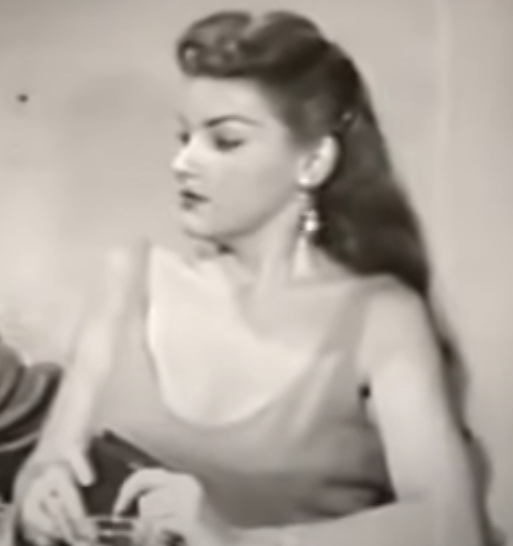
Honey Harlow as Rose

- Timothy Farrell as Umberto Scalli
- Lenny Bruce as Vincent
- Bernie Jones as Punky, the Swedish Sailor
- Honey Bruce Friedman Rose (as Honey Harlow)
- Sally Marr as Hostess
- Bunny Parker as Dancehall Girl
- Joie Abrams as Dancehall Girl
- Ronald Lee
- Bill King
- Mary Holiday as Dancehall Girl
- Harry Keaton
- Joe Piro as Henchman

== Soundtrack ==
Music Department Sanford H. Dickinson ... music consultant (as Sandford H. Dickinson) Charles Ruddy ... musical director (uncredited)
