= Honey Bruce =

American exotic dancer (1927–2005)

Honey Harlow
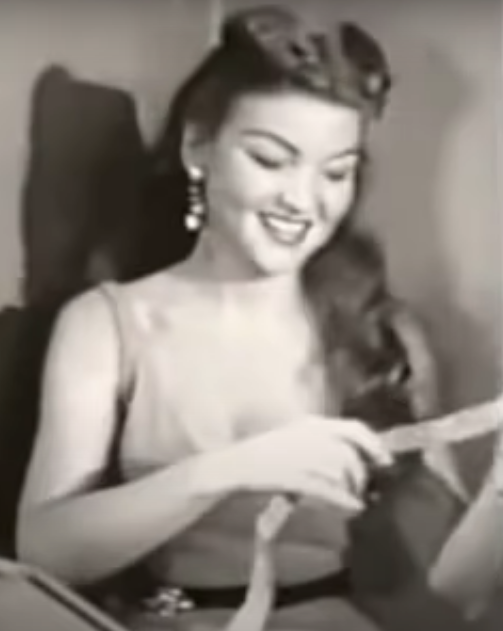
- Honey Harlow as Rose in Dance Hall Racket
- Born: Harriett Elizabeth Jolliff; August 15, 1927; Manila, Arkansas, U.S.
- Died: September 12, 2005 (aged 78); Honolulu, Hawaii, U.S.
- Occupations: Stripper, showgirl
- Spouses: Lenny Bruce (m. 1951; div. 1957) Jeffrey Friedman (m. 1984)
- Children: 1

Honey Bruce Friedman (born Harriett Elizabeth Jolliff; August 15, 1927 – September 12, 2005), also known by her professional name Honey Harlow, was an American stripper and showgirl who was married to comedian Lenny Bruce. In 1976, she released her autobiography, titled Honey: The Life and Loves of Lenny's Shady Lady.

== Early life ==
Friedman was born Harriett Jolliff in Manila, Arkansas, the daughter of unmarried teenage parents Mabel Layson and Murl Jolliff. She never knew her father, who died in a tuberculosis sanitarium. She was named after her paternal grandmother, Harriett Joliff (1877–1941), but as a child her nickname was Poochie.

Her mother, Mabel, moved her and her sister Virginia to Detroit, Michigan, in search of work. Finding work at nightclubs, Mabel married a local hustler who often was in trouble with the law. While ostensibly owning a bookshop, in reality he was operating an illegal business from their attic.

Young Harriet's mother and step-father enforced strict Catholic rules on her, and reportedly the home was an abusive environment. Harriet dreamed of leaving home for a career in show business, and she intently studied Hollywood movie stars like Lana Turner and Rita Hayworth.

Harriet's unstable home life led to rebellion, and she started skipping school and staying away from home. Eventually she ran away from home with a female friend and two boys to nearby Toledo, Ohio, and from there, the four teenagers went to Florida. The boys hot-wired cars to steal transportation, and soon they arrived in Miami where they rented a room. To earn money to support themselves, the girls answered an ad in the paper for showgirls; Harriet was hired to be a topless dancer, but her friend was deemed not pretty enough and so was given a job as a cigarette girl.

Once Harriet had earned enough money for the group to continue on their journey, she quit the dancing job, and the group planned to move from Miami Beach to Palm Beach. The two boys she was with had enlisted in the army and were "sowing some oats" before heading to basic training for World War II. One of the boys raped Harriet while she was sleeping, which she shrugged off as "the way things were." Harriet's friend left the group and went home to Detroit.

With Harriet and the two boys in need of more money, they decided to break into a vending machine. They broke out the glass and managed to get cigarettes, candy, and cash into their pockets and escaped on foot into a nearby orange grove, but were caught by police. Once in custody, it was established that the group was responsible for several cars being stolen in addition to the theft, and Harriet was sentenced to one year incarceration at Florida State Prison.

After her release, she successfully worked as a stripper in Miami under the name Hot Honey Harlow.

== Lenny Bruce ==
On June 15, 1951, she married comedian Lenny Bruce after meeting him in Baltimore. Bruce tried to become her manager and make her a legitimate star, but she fought against this. She sometimes performed with her husband on stage, including an act based on the Bride of Frankenstein.

As an actress she appeared in the 1953 indie film Dance Hall Racket, which also starred Lenny Bruce.

They divorced on January 21, 1957, after having a daughter, Kitty. The two fought a custody battle over their daughter.

== Later life and death ==
Harlow successfully lobbied New York Governor George Pataki to pardon Bruce posthumously for the obscenity conviction resulting from his performance and arrest at the Cafe Au Go Go in Greenwich Village in 1964. Lenny Bruce died of a drug overdose in 1966, and she continued to promote his legacy.

She is credited in the 1974 film Lenny as being an advisor for the film.

She married Jeffrey Friedman in 1984, and they remained married and lived in Hawaii until her death. She had legally changed her name to Honey Bruce Friedman.

She died from complications of colitis at age 78 on September 12, 2005, in Honolulu.

== Filmography ==
- Princess of the Nile (1954)
- Dance Hall Racket (1953)
