= Phil Tucker =

American film director

Phil Tucker (May 22, 1927 – November 30, 1985) was an American film director, producer, writer, and editor. While Tucker directed his first six feature films in the span of two years (while still in his mid-20s), he is best known for his first film, the science fiction B movie Robot Monster, often considered an example of "so bad it's good" film-making in the Ed Wood vein, and for the Lenny Bruce movie Dance Hall Racket featuring Bruce's wife Honey Harlow.

In 1952, he was reportedly offered $300,000 to make a sympathetic biopic about Lucky Luciano.

In December 1953, he attempted suicide in response to the poor reception of Robot Monster and his subsequent inability to find work. According to Keep Watching The Skies! by Bill Warren, his attempted suicide was actually fueled by depression and a dispute with the film's distributor, who had allegedly refused to pay Tucker his contracted percentage of the film's profits.

There are further claims that after 1955, Tucker was blacklisted within the film industry, though he did go on to direct a number of other productions, including 1960's The Cape Canaveral Monsters.

By the 1970s, Tucker had established himself as a formidable film editor, finally escaping the stigma of his early directorial work. He contributed to such well-known films as Orca and the 1976 remake of King Kong, and remained in post-production throughout the rest of his career.

In addition to his love of film, Tucker had an avid interest in all things mechanical. He invented a rotary engine known as the CT Surge Turbine (CT stood for Carnot/Tucker) for which he was granted a US patent. Tucker built and operated a prototype of the engine which he tried, unsuccessfully, to sell to the automobile industry as a more efficient alternative to the conventional internal combustion engine.

In 2010, Zed Fest Film Festival named a top award after Phil Tucker. The Phil Tucker Spirit Award is given out to encourage and support independent filmmakers that work in the horror, suspense, science fiction, drama, action, adventure, and art house genres. The event is held annually every November in North Hollywood Arts District.

== Filmography ==
Year	Film	Director	Producer	Writer	Editor
1953	Robot Monster	☒	☒		
1953	Dance Hall Racket	☒			
1954	Tia Juana After Midnite	☒			
1954	Dream Follies	☒			
1954	Baghdad After Midnight	☒			
1955	Broadway Jungle	☒	☒	☒	
1960	The Cape Canaveral Monsters	☒		☒	
1960	Kiss Me Baby				☒
1976	Death Riders		☒		
1980	The Nude Bomb				☒
1985	Out of Control				☒
