= Loretta King Hadler =

American actress

- Born: Loretta King; August 20, 1917; Phoenix, Arizona, U.S.
- Died: September 10, 2007 (aged 90); Century City, California, U.S.
- Occupation: Actress
- Spouse: Herman Hadler (m. 1970)

Loretta King Hadler (August 20, 1917 – September 10, 2007) was an American actress, best known for the brevity of her career and her work with director Ed Wood.

== Biography ==
Born in Phoenix, Arizona, she performed in Mister Roberts at the Sombrero Playhouse during March 1954 with Don Taylor and Marshall Thompson.

She then starred in Wood's 1955 Bride of the Monster and, during the 1970s, she appeared in two movies by director Horace Jackson, Johnny Tough and Joey, under the name Loretta Hadler. In 2007, she died of natural causes in Century City, California at age 90, and was survived by her husband, Herman Hadler.

== Legacy ==
King was portrayed by Juliet Landau in the 1994 Tim Burton bio-pic Ed Wood.

== Filmography ==
- Dr. Harvey W. Wiley (1955) (TV) as Woman
- The Pirate and the Lawyer (1955) (TV) as Louise Livingston
- Bride of the Monster (1955) as Janet Lawton
- Tough (1974) as Teacher
- Joey (1977)
