= Frank Worth =

American photographer

- Born: 1923
- Died: 2000 (aged 76–77)
- Occupation: Photographer
- Known for: Vintage photographer of Hollywood stars

Frank Worth (1923–2000) was an American photographer who befriended and photographed many Hollywood actors and actresses between 1939 and 1964. His black and white candid pictures are unusual for the era, when most stars limited themselves to carefully posed glamour portraits. He kept many of his photographs private so that they were not seen until after his death. He was rumored to have been intimate with several of his subjects including Marilyn Monroe and Jayne Mansfield; he confirmed his affair with Monroe shortly before his death.

Worth was born in New York City. He became interested in photography in high school. Moving to Hollywood, he was hired to photograph movie stars but quickly became a freelance photographer. He made friends with Rudy Vallee and his wife, who allowed him to live with them and introduced him to other stars. Among his early subjects was Rita Hayworth, then an unknown starlet. Worth became a friend of numerous well known actors and actresses including James Dean, Marilyn Monroe, Frank Sinatra, James Cagney and Pat O'Brien. These friendships plus "a knack for being in the right place at the right time" allowed him to capture unique images of the stars. He was allowed onto the set of classic films such as Rebel Without A Cause and The Seven Year Itch. He filmed Elizabeth Taylor's first wedding. He also did sports photography and was the original photographer for the Los Angeles Dodgers.

He gradually gave up photography and fell into poverty, but he refused to sell the photographs of the people who had been his friends. After his death in December 2000, his cousin acting as executor found more than 10,000 negatives in his apartment. Eventually a friend realized the possible value of the photos and formed a company to publish them. They were the subject of several heavily publicized exhibitions, including one in London in 2002 which Christie's auction house described as "the most extraordinary collection of its kind for the past 50 years" and a Sotheby's exhibition in 2003. The London exhibition was curated by twins Austin and Howard Mutti-Mewse, whose longtime obsession with Hollywood helped them to sort out the long-lost collection.
