= Glen or Glenda =

1953 film

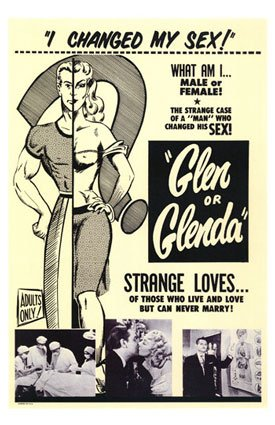
- Theatrical film poster
- Directed by: Ed Wood
- Written by: Ed Wood
- Produced by: George Weiss
- Starring: Bela Lugosi; Ed Wood; Timothy Farrell; Dolores Fuller; Tommy Haynes; Lyle Talbot; Conrad Brooks
- Narrated by: Timothy Farrell
- Cinematography: William C. Thompson
- Edited by: Bud Schelling
- Music by: William Lava (uncredited)
- Distributed by: Screen Classics
- Release date: April 1953
- Running time: 65 minutes
- Country: United States
- Language: English
- Budget: $20,000 (equivalent to $241,000 in 2025)

Glen or Glenda is a 1953 American independent exploitation film directed, written by and starring Ed Wood (credited in his starring role as "Daniel Davis"), and featuring Wood's then-girlfriend Dolores Fuller and Bela Lugosi. It was produced by George Weiss who also made the exploitation film Test Tube Babies that same year.

The film is a docudrama about cross-dressing and transvestism, and is semi-autobiographical in nature. Wood himself was a cross-dresser, and the film is a plea for tolerance. It was widely considered one of the worst films ever made upon release. However, it has since been reevaluated and has become a cult film due to its low-budget production values, idiosyncratic style, and early cinematic themes of transgender acceptance.

== Plot ==
A police inspector investigating the suicide of a transvestite named Patrick/Patricia seeks the advice of Dr. Alton, who narrates for him the story of Glen/Glenda.

Glen started out by asking to wear his sister's dress for a Halloween party. The narrative explains that Glen is a transvestite, but not a homosexual. He hides his cross-dressing from his fiancée, Barbara, fearing that she will reject him. She voices her suspicion that there is another woman in his life, unaware that the woman is his feminine alter ego, Glenda.

Alton narrates that Glen is torn between the idea of being honest with Barbara before their wedding or waiting until after. Glen confides in a transvestite friend of his, John, whose wife left him after catching him wearing her clothes.

Glen/Glenda is caught in a storm. The sound of thunder drives him to collapse to the floor. An extended dream sequence begins, containing several vignettes symbolically depicting Glen's struggle with his sexuality. Glen/Glenda wakes and decides to tell Barbara the truth. She initially reacts with distress, but ultimately decides to stay with him. She offers him an angora sweater as a sign of acceptance.

Back in Dr. Alton's office, he relates another narrative, this one concerning a World War II veteran named Alan who underwent sex reassignment surgery to become "a lovely young woman" named Ann.

Dr. Alton says that Glen's case is less severe than Alan/Ann's. Alton tells Glen that he can take the Glenda identity, which comes from his father's meanness and his mother's dislike for her own father, and project it onto Barbara. Barbara says she will help Glen with his struggles, even accepting his wearing women's clothing; and eventually Glen and Barbara are happy together, as he successfully projects the Glenda identity onto her.

Throughout the film, a threatening scientist in a skull-filled room makes bizarre pronouncements including some about the old nursery rhyme what little girls and boys are made of (snails and puppy dogs' tails, etc.).

== Cast ==
- Bela Lugosi as Scientist/Spirit
- Ed Wood as Glen/Glenda
- Timothy Farrell as Dr. Alton/Narrator
- Dolores Fuller as Barbara
- 'Tommy' Haynes as Alan/Anne
- Lyle Talbot as Inspector Warren
- Charlie Crafts as Johnny
- Conrad Brooks as Banker/Reporter/Pickup Artist/Bearded Drag
- William M. A. deOrgler aka Captain DeZita as The Devil

== Production ==
Shot in four days, the film was loosely inspired by the sex reassignment surgery of Christine Jorgensen, which made national headlines in the U.S. in 1952. George Weiss, a Hollywood producer of low-budget films, commissioned a movie to exploit the case. Originally Weiss made Jorgensen several offers to appear in the film, but these were turned down. Wood convinced Weiss that his own transvestism made him the perfect director despite his modest résumé. Wood was given the job, but instead made a movie about transvestism. Nonetheless, posters for the film still claimed it was based on Jorgensen's case.

Wood persuaded Lugosi, at the time poor and drug-addicted, to appear in the movie. Lugosi's scenes were shot at the Jack Miles Studios in Los Angeles. He was reportedly paid $5000 for the role, although some stories state the actual amount was only $1000. Lugosi is credited as "The Scientist", a character whose purpose is unclear. He acts as a sort of narrator but gives no narration relevant to the plot; that job is reserved for the film's primary narrator, Timothy Farrell.

This was the only film Wood directed but did not also produce. Wood played the eponymous character, but under the pseudonym "Daniel Davis". His then-girlfriend, Dolores Fuller, played Glen's girlfriend/fiancée Barbara. Wood later returned to Glen or Glenda in his pulp novel Killer in Drag (1963). The plot features a transvestite called Glen whose alter-ego is called Glenda. He is executed in the sequel Death of a Transvestite (1967) after a struggle for the right to go to the electric chair dressed as Glenda.

The erotic-themed striptease/bondage vignettes were not created by Wood. They were reportedly added by producer George Weiss. He needed extra scenes to add to what he felt was an overly-short film. While not organic parts of the narrative, they seem to tell their own tales of gender dynamics and so fit in with the general themes of the film. The whipping scene suggests a master/slave relationship. The man is dominant and the woman submissive, seeming to reflect male chauvinism. The flirtatious and striptease-themed vignettes were typical of 1950s exploitation films, as was the rape scene. Wood's original director's cut of the film without those added scenes runs 65 minutes, while the producer's cut of film with the added scenes runs 71 minutes.

The film has several deleted scenes. In the theatrical trailer, included in LaserDisc and DVD editions, the scene in which Fuller hands over her angora sweater is a different take than the one in the release version — in the trailer, she tosses it to Wood in a huff, while the release version shows her handing it over more acceptingly. There is also a shot of Wood in drag, mouthing the word "Cut!"

The second part of the film, titled Alan or Anne, is much shorter, told largely through stock footage, and was made to meet the distributor's demand for a sex change film. Alan, whose story is essentially unrelated to that of Glen, is a pseudo-hermaphrodite who fights in World War II wearing women's underwear and undergoes sex reassignment surgery after returning from the war.

== Release ==
Domestically, the film was limited in release, having been pre-sold to some theaters (under alternative titles such as I Led Two Lives, He or She? and I Changed My Sex). Internationally, the film was also limited, and in France and Belgium, the title was translated as Louis ou Louise and in Argentina as Yo Cambié Mi Sexo (I changed my sex); the film had a brief screening in the Republic of China. It was re-released to theaters in 1981 by Paramount.

According to Tim Dirks, the film was one of a wave of "cheap teen movies" released for the drive-in market. They consisted of "exploitative, cheap fare created especially for them [teens] in a newly-established teen/drive-in genre."

It was denied classification by the British Board of Film Classification upon submission on February 26, 1958.

The Image DVD release from 2000 was mastered from a censored print and is missing several salacious bits.

In 2009, Glen or Glenda became the final film to be restored and colorized by Legend Films, who subsequently released it on DVD.

A restored HD print of the film was released in a shortened 60-minute version from Something Weird Video and the American Genre Film Archive in 2020 via the short-lived Alamo Drafthouse on-demand service.

== Critical reception ==
Describing the film as "a half-mad old movie Paramount hasn't so much rescued as disinterred", critic Janet Maslin wrote in a 1981 review of the film in The New York Times that "it's dreadful enough to have a certain comic appeal", that the Lugosi character "presides over the action like some sex change deity", that it is "impassioned [and] incoherent", but noted that "there is plenty of inadvertent humor in Glen or Glenda, with its weirdo homilies, rotten acting and frequent talk of underwear." Writing in DVD Talk, critic Ian Jane wrote that "Wood throws in all manner of strange stock footage of Buffalo and bound women alongside clips of Bela Lugosi freaking out", that the film is "so utterly messed up that it borders on arthouse rather than simple b-movie exploitation", but that it "holds up immensely for multiple viewings due to its total incoherence". A review by Andrea LeVasseur in AllMovie described the film as a "showcase of Wood's infamous ineptitude", and noted that "the personal stories of two transvestites are spoken with ridiculous dialogue, terrible acting, and interspersed with irrelevant stock footage. Every so often, a drug-addicted Bela Lugosi would appear with some strange and pointless narration."

The critic Leonard Maltin names Glen or Glenda as "possibly the worst movie ever made". Maltin further added: "Dizzying hodgepodge of stock footage, demented dream sequences, and heartfelt plea for tolerance linked by campy Lugosi narrating from haunted house." Richard Barrios describes Glen or Glenda as "one of the funniest and worst movies ever made".

== Legacy ==
In 1980, Wood was posthumously given the accolade of 'Worst Director of All Time' at the Golden Turkey Awards, and a revival of interest in his work followed. This led to Glen or Glenda being reissued in 1982. This cut included six minutes of additional footage. One of the restored scenes features Glen rejecting a pass made to him by a man. At this point, the film was reviewed seriously, and reclaimed as a radical work, by Steve Jenkins in the Monthly Film Bulletin.

In his book Cult Movies 3, Danny Peary suggests this is actually a radical, if ineptly made, film that presents a far more personal story than is contained in films by more well-respected auteurs.

In 1994, Tim Burton chronicled the troubled production of Glen or Glenda in Ed Wood. The film includes re-creations of several key scenes, including Lugosi's narration and Glen's plea for his girlfriend Dolores Fuller's understanding at the end of the film.

The character Glen in the film Seed of Chucky, the fifth film in the Child's Play series, was named after the film.

Director David Lynch named the film as one of his favorites.

The mascot of Plan 9 from Bell Labs, the name of which is a reference to one of Wood's other films, Plan 9 from Outer Space, is a bunny named "Glenda".

== See also ==
- Transgender in film and television
- Cross-dressing in film and television
- List of cult films
- List of 20th century films considered the worst
- Ed Wood filmography

== Sources ==
- Craig, Rob (2009), "Glen or Glenda? (1953)", Ed Wood, Mad Genius: A Critical Study of the Films, McFarland & Company, ISBN 978-0-7864-5423-5, archived from the original on April 28, 2019
- Rudolph Grey, Nightmare of Ecstasy: The Life and Art of Edward D. Wood, Jr. (1992) ISBN 978-0-922915-24-8
- The Haunted World of Edward D. Wood, Jr. (1996), a documentary film directed by Brett Thompson
