= Test Tube Babies (film) =

1948 film

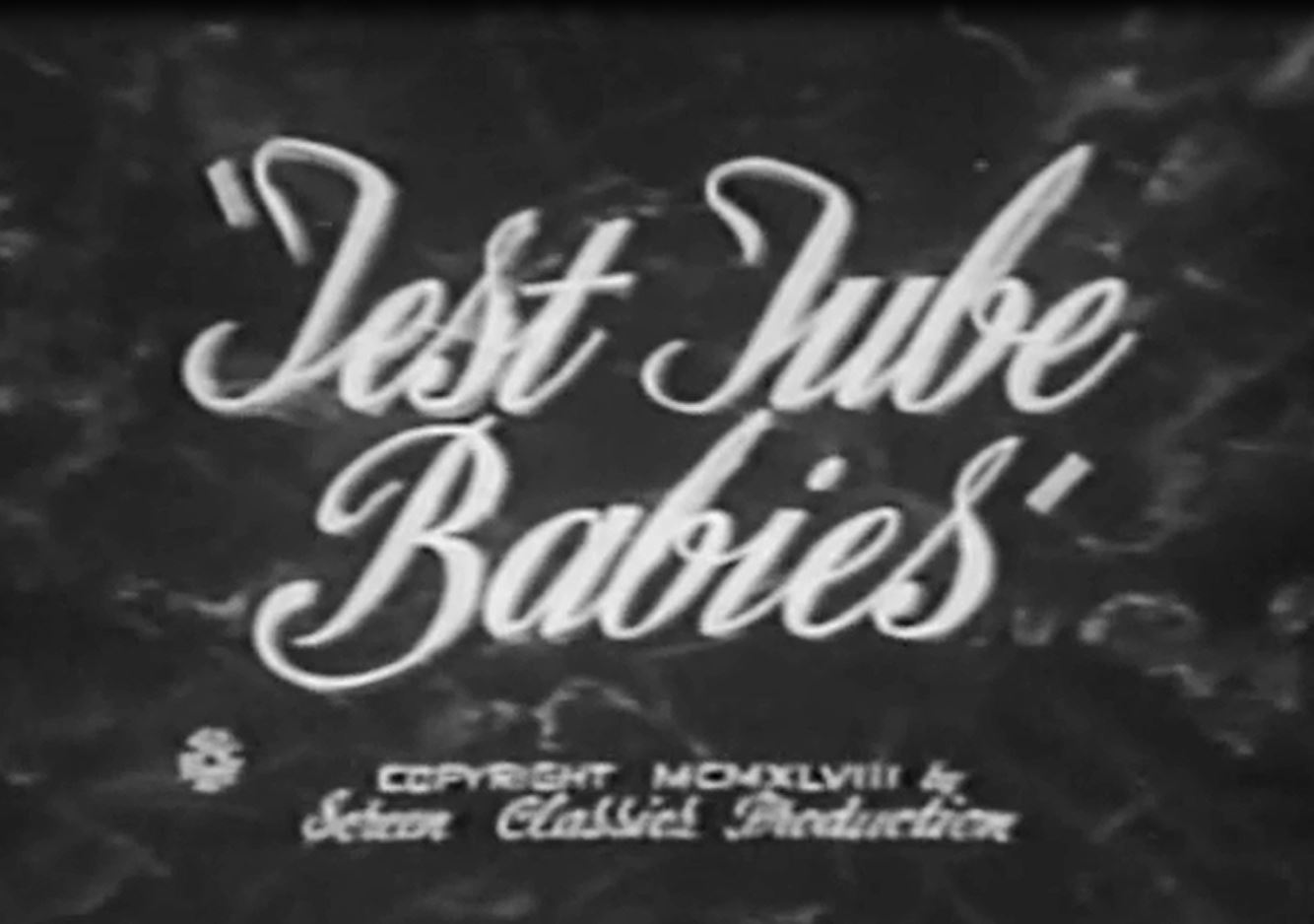
- Title card
- Directed by: W. Merle Connell
- Written by: Richard S. McMahan
- Produced by: George Weiss
- Starring: Dorothy Duke; William Thomason; Timothy Farrell; John Michael; Peggy Roach
- Cinematography: Irving Akers
- Edited by: Nathan Cy Braunstein; Sheldon Nemeyer
- Production company: Screen Classics
- Distributed by: Screen Classics
- Release date: April 9, 1948
- Running time: 70 minutes
- Country: United States
- Language: English

Test Tube Babies, also known as Blessed Are They (American reissue title), Sins of Love (American reissue title) and The Pill (America reissue title, recut version), is a 1948 American independent exploitation film directed by W. Merle Connell and produced by George Weiss. It is a narrative about artificial insemination with scenes of nudity and sexual promiscuity included. One scene shows the male lead character's sperm viewed through a microscope.

== Plot ==
A young married couple find themselves drifting apart. Wife Cathy Bennet finds temporary pleasure at swinging parties or in the arms of another man, Frank Grover. Husband George Bennet confronts his wife about the widening chasm between them; she tells him she feels they are somehow incomplete without children. She undergoes testing to see why she hasn't conceived. George, who has accompanied her, is asked to also undergo testing and is found to be the problem: he is sterile. Physician Dr. Wright suggests artificial insemination using a sperm donor. This proves successful and the Bennetts begin a new and happy phase of their marriage.

== Cast ==
- Dorothy Duke as Cathy Bennett
- William Thomason as George Bennett
- Timothy Farrell as Dr. Wright
- John Michael as Frank Grover
- Peggy Roach as Cathy's mother
- Stacey Alexander as Don Williams
- Georgie Barton as Betty Williams
- Mary Lou Reckow as Dolores LaFleur
- Bebe Berto as Jerry
- Guy Gordon as Phil
- Helen Cogan as Grace
- Gine Franklin as Ralph
- Zona Siggins as Nurse Mason

== See also ==
- List of films in the public domain in the United States
