= William C. Thompson (cinematographer) =

American cinematographer (1889–1963)

- Born: March 30, 1889; Bound Brook, New Jersey, U.S.
- Died: October 22, 1963 (aged 74); Los Angeles, California, U.S.
- Occupation: Cinematographer

William C. Thompson (March 30, 1889 – October 22, 1963) was an American cinematographer.

Thompson started his career in the 1910s and is best remembered today as the cinematographer of many of the films of Ed Wood, including Glen or Glenda (1953), Jail Bait, The Sinister Urge (1960), Night of the Ghouls (1959), The Violent Years (1955), Bride of the Monster (1955) and Plan 9 from Outer Space (1957). Other films he worked on include Maniac (1934), Dementia (1955), Journey to Freedom (1957), and The Astounding She-Monster (1957).

== Partial filmography ==
- Shore Acres (1914)
- Destiny (1915)
- The Curse of Eve (1917)
- Revenge (1918)
- Satan Junior (1919)
- Pals (1925)
- Trails of the Golden West (1931)
- Pueblo Terror (1931)
- No Greater Love (1932)
- Found Alive (1933)
- A Demon for Trouble (1934)
- The Brand of Hate (1934)
- The Irish Gringo (1935) also produced and directed
- Lucky Fugitives (1936)
- Project Moon Base (1953)
