= Ed Wood filmography =

This is a list of films written, produced or directed by Ed Wood. Acting roles are also noted.

== Filmography ==
Year	Film	Role	Notes
1948	The Streets of Laredo	Director, screenwriter, actor	Half-hour western not completed by Wood, the film was shot silent and on very low quality film stock; Wood had planned to use minimal dialogue and fill most of the soundtrack with cowboy songs; the film was decades later completed, scored and theatrically premiered by Dolores Fuller and Crawford John Thomas as Crossroads of Laredo posthumously in 1995 (see below under 1995).
1950	The Baron of Arizona	Stuntman only	A biopic about James Reavis starring Vincent Price as the conman who nearly stole the Arizona Territory; Wood worked as a stuntman dressed as a woman on a runaway stagecoach.
1951	The Sun Was Setting	Co-Producer, Co-Director, Screenwriter, Music	aka The Sun Also Sets; 14-minute B&W short about a young woman coming to terms with her impending death. This film only aired locally in Los Angeles. It was codirected by Ben Brody, and stars Tom Keene, Phyllis Coates and Angela Stevens. Filmed on 16mm at KTTV Studios in December 1951; never available on home video, but a print can be watched on YouTube;
1952	Trick Shooting with Kenne Duncan	Director	This 9-minute documentary consists of Kenne Duncan performing trick shooting stunts and showcasing weapons by Remington Arms. The weapons showcased are a Remington Model 552 and a Remington Nylon 66. This film was made in 1952, around the same time Wood co-produced The Lawless Rider with Kenne Duncan. Sinister Cinema released this short as a bonus feature on a home video release with The Lawless Rider (1952)
1952	The Lawless Rider	Associate Producer, Plot	Hour-long Western film shot in 1952, directed by Yakima Canutt, starring Johnny Carpenter, Frankie Darro, Noel Neill and Kenne Duncan. It was not released until 1954. Wood co-produced the film with Alex Gordon and Carpenter, and claimed that he wrote the plot on which Johnny Carpenter's screenplay was based (originally to be called The Outlaw Marshall).
1952	Double Noose	Co-Screenwriter (with Michael Hayes)	TV Western show shot in 1952, produced by Sidney R. Ross, directed by Derwin Abbe and starring Tom Keene. Only the script apparently survives.
1953	Glen or Glenda	Director, screenwriter, actor	This 1953 fictional documentary approach to transvestitism, also known as I Changed My Sex! or I Led Two Lives!, is semi-autobiographical in nature and many suggest that Wood made it as a plea for tolerance. The story was prompted by the world's first successful sex change operation. Movie producer George Weiss wanted to capitalize on the current buzz by making a freak-show type film about sex reassignment surgery. Wood made a pitch, took the money and, much to Weiss' horror, produced this compassionate film about transvestites instead. The film stars Wood himself as Glen/Glenda (credited as Daniel Davis), Bela Lugosi, Dolores Fuller, Lyle Talbot, Conrad Brooks and Timothy Farrell.
1953	Son of the Renegade	Co-Screenwriter	Another Johnny Carpenter Western film (running 55 minutes) directed by Reg Brown; Wood allegedly helped Carpenter with the plot, uncredited. This film is available on DVD and online
1953	Crossroad Avenger: The Adventures of the Tucson Kid	Director, screenwriter, actor	Unsold 25-minute Pilot for an unproduced television series (filmed in Color) starring Tom Keene and featuring Lyle Talbot, Harvey B. Dunn, Don Nagel, Kenne Duncan, Tom Tyler (and Wood playing a Pony Express rider); Wood later expanded this film into a 50-minute feature called The Adventures of the Tucson Kid; available on DVD
1953	Boots	Director, screenwriter	Written and directed by Ed Wood (approximately 25 minutes) for Tucson Kid Productions, this was made as a sequel to Crossroad Avenger.
1954	Jail Bait	Co-Producer, Director, Screenwriter	A film noir in which a criminal has a face swap operation in order to avoid the police. The original shooting title was The Hidden Face; Co-produced by Ed Wood, Joy Newton Houck Sr. and J. Francis White; Co-written with Alex Gordon, the film stars Lyle Talbot, Steve Reeves, Dolores Fuller, Herbert Rawlinson, Theodora Thurman, Don Nagel and Timothy Farrell; Rawlinson died the day after he finished shooting his scenes. A racist "blackface" dance number replaced a stripper act at the last minute (without consulting Wood); Distributor Ron Ormond (of Howco) changed the title to Jail Bait just before releasing it.
1955	Bride of the Monster	Co-Producer, Director, Screenwriter	Originally titled The Atomic Monster or Bride of the Atom. Stars Bela Lugosi, Tor Johnson, Paul Marco, Conrad Brooks, Harvey B. Dunn, Loretta King. Lugosi plays a mad scientist bent on creating a race of atomic supermen that will allow him to take over the world. Tor Johnson plays his lumbering assistant, Lobo. The film features an obviously rubber octopus (rumored to have been stolen by Wood and his colleagues from storage at Republic Studios) in the finale. The part of the leading lady was given to Loretta King, which led to Wood's later breakup with his girlfriend Dolores Fuller who had been promised the part. Bela Lugosi was hospitalized for drug addiction soon after the film was completed. Tim Burton affectionately relates much of the story behind this movie in Ed Wood (1994).
1956	The Violent Years	Screenwriter (uncredited)	A.k.a. Female or Teenage Girl Gang. Directed by William M. Morgan and based on an original story by the film's producer Roy Reid called Teenage Killers. A neglected, rich teenage girl and three of her friends go on a crime spree, robbing gas stations, vandalizing classrooms and forcing total strangers to have sex with them at gunpoint. It was the most financially successful film of Wood's career. Stars Jean Moorehead and Timothy Farrell.
1957	Plan 9 from Outer Space	Co-Producer, Director, Screenwriter, Editor	This is Wood's best known movie. Made in 1956, the film had a theatrical premiere on March 15, 1957 at the Carlton Theatre in Hollywood under the title Grave Robbers From Outer Space. It was put into general release in July 1958, retitled Plan Nine From Outer Space. It stars Tor Johnson, Gregory Walcott, Bela Lugosi, Vampira, Tom Keene, Duke Moore, Lyle Talbot, Conrad Brooks, Dudley Manlove, Bunny Breckinridge, Paul Marco and Criswell. Bela Lugosi died in 1956 before production began, but Wood incorporated some earlier footage he had taken of Lugosi into the film.
1957	Final Curtain	Producer, Director, Screenwriter	Unsold 22-minute pilot for a projected TV anthology series called Portraits in Terror, starring Duke Moore and Jeannie Stevens, narrated by Dudley Manlove; Bela Lugosi was considering this script when he died, and had to be replaced in the cast by Duke Moore; footage from this unsold pilot was later integrated into Wood's 1959 Night of the Ghouls; Wood always regarded Final Curtain to be one of his best works. It resurfaced in 2011 and is now available for viewing on the internet.
1957	The Night the Banshee Cried	Producer, Director, Screenwriter	22-minute short TV film which is apparently a lost film; it was made as an episode for a projected TV anthology series called Portraits in Terror; in 1960, Wood tried once again to sell his Portraits in Terror TV series, including Banshee and Final Curtain in the package, but again it failed to sell.
1958	The Bride and the Beast	Screenwriter	Also known as Queen of the Gorillas, it was produced and directed by Adrian Weiss. Ed Wood wrote the screenplay with input from Weiss. A woman (Charlotte Austin) becomes romantically attracted to a great ape kept caged in her husband's basement. When hypnotised, it is discovered that, in a previous life, she was a queen of the gorillas. A RiffTrax version was released in 2014.
1958	The Astounding She-Monster	Consultant	Wood served as an unofficial "consultant" on this Ronald Ashcroft film such as advising on the use of stock footage. Stars Robert Clarke, Shirley Kirkpatrick and Kenne Duncan; released in England as The Mysterious Invader.
1959	Revenge of the Virgins	Screenwriter	A 1959 American "nudie cutie" Western film directed by Peter Perry Jr. Ed Wood wrote the screenplay.
1959	Night of the Ghouls	Writer, Director	This film was made in 1959 but was not released until 1984 (see under film's actual release date (1984)).
1960	The Sinister Urge	Co-producer, Director, Screenwriter	Stars Dino Fantini, Duke Moore, Kenne Duncan, Conrad Brooks, Carl Anthony and Jean Fontaine. Crime drama about women going missing or turning up dead, victims of the pornography industry. Film incorporates footage from Wood's unfinished 1956 film Hellborn (a.k.a. Rock and Roll Hell). This was Ed Wood's last attempt to make a "real movie".
1961	Anatomy of a Psycho	Contributed to Screenplay	Stars Ronnie Burns (George Burns' son) and Michael Granger. Directed by Boris Petroff (a.k.a. Brooke L. Peters), who was Jane Mann's husband. Wood just contributed to Jane Mann's screenplay. Music excerpts from Plan 9 from Outer Space (1959) were used in this film.
1962	Married Too Young	Co-Screenwriter (Wood collaborated with Nat Tanchuck)	Directed by George Moskov, this film was about young newlyweds who get mixed up with a gang of car thieves. Stars Harold Lloyd Jr., Anthony Dexter, Marianna Hill, Jana Lund.
1963	Shotgun Wedding	Screenwriter (Wood's script was based on a story idea by Jane Mann)	Hour-long film produced and directed by Boris Petroff (Jane Mann's husband), starring J. Pat O'Malley, Jenny Maxwell, William Schallert, Valerie Allen; story of two warring hillbilly clans and a young girl who is scheming to get one of the yokels to marry her.
1965	Orgy of the Dead	Screenwriter, Assistant Director	Originally titled Nudie Ghoulies, this was Ed Wood's first plunge into the world of movie erotica. In the film, a writer and his girlfriend crash their car and find themselves in a cemetery where they are forced to watch the dead dance for a Lord of the Dead, played by Criswell. A bevy of dancing strippers outfitted in various motifs make up the bulk of this movie, though it also oddly features a werewolf and a mummy. Strangely assembled and surreal in its plot and blatantly low-budget, it was directed by Stephen Apostolof. Filmed in "AstraVision" and "Shocking SexiColor", it stars Pat Barringer, Criswell and Texas Starr. A paperback novel version of the film written by Wood was published in 1966.
1967	For Love and Money	Wood contributed the plot; James Rogers wrote the screenplay	A group of well-endowed women decide to use sex to become successful in business; adapted from Wood's novel Sexecutives, directed by Donald A. Davis.
1969	Operation Redlight	Screenwriter, actor	Based on Wood's novel Mama's Diary (written as Dick Trent). Wood plays a popular porn novelist managing a whorehouse in Vietnam; produced by Jacques Descent and directed by Don Doyle.
1969	Gun Runners	Screenwriter	Low budget Western film directed by Donald A. Davis; Ed Wood wrote the script.
1969	One Million AC/DC	Screenwriter	Film is about a tribe of horny cave dwellers in prehistoric times who run afoul of a very antagonistic Tyrannosaurus Rex. Wood wrote the screenplay using the pseudonym 'Akdov Telmig' (Vodka Gimlet spelled backwards), though a typographical error in the credits lists him as 'Akdon Telmig'. Produced and directed by Ed De Priest, the film stars Susan Berkely and Billy Wolf. Gary Graver was the cameraman (80 minutes).
1969	The Photographer	Co-Screenwriter, Actor	A.k.a. The Love Feast or Pretty Models All in a Row. Soft-core pornographic movie with Ed in the lead role of Mr. Murphy (the film's comic relief). Believed to have been written and directed by Ed's friend (and fellow war veteran) Joseph F. Robertson, while others (including Robertson himself) stated that Ed Wood directed it uncredited. Probably Wood's most humiliating role, playing a very strange guy who submits to the fetishistic desires of a group of housewives who are having sex at his house, forcing Wood to wear a baby doll nightie and a dog collar and leash affixed to his neck.
1970	Mrs. Stone's Thing	Actor	Also known as The Sensuous Wife. Ed's friend Joseph F. Robertson wrote and directed this film. Ed plays a bashful and depressed-looking transvestite. A housewife learns that her husband has been attending sex orgies, and persuades him to take her along with him to get in on the action. Stars Ed Wood, Victor Rich, Karen Johnson, Nancy Holliday, "Lida" and Jerry Moore.
1970	Take It Out in Trade	Director, Screenwriter, Film editor, Actor	Wood's first completely pornographic picture about a private eye who tracks down a missing millionaire's daughter to a sleazy whorehouse. It mostly features ex-girlfriends of Wood's friends and people from Ed Wood's neighborhood, most notably real-life sex worker Nona Carver (as "Sleazy Maisie Rumpledinck"), Duke Moore, Linda Colpin, Donna Stanley, Monica Gayle and Louis Ojena. Ed Wood plays a transvestite named Alecia in a bizarre 7-minute sequence. Silent outtakes were discovered years later and released by Something Weird Video in 1995. (see below under 1995)
1970	Excited	Screenwriter	Wood wrote the screenplay for this film, once again using the pseudonym 'Akdov Telmig' (Vodka Gimlet spelled backwards). Directed by Gary Graver and starring Maria Lease, this film is about two hot young girls who go off on a sexual adventure.
1970	Venus Flytrap (a.k.a. The Revenge of Dr. X)	Screenwriter (uncredited)	An American-Japanese monster film starring James Craig as a mad scientist who creates sentient life from plants. Written by Ed Wood in the 1950s, the screenplay was reworked by Norman Earl Thomson. It was released in America on VHS under the name The Revenge of Dr. X, the videotape packaging deleting the film's proper credits and instead listing the credits for a contemporary Filipino horror movie called The Mad Doctor of Blood Island. The film was released in Japan as Akuma no Niwa (The Devil's Garden).
1971	The Only House In Town	Director, Screenwriter	This one-hour film shot on 16mm has nothing to do with Wood's novel The Only House (which was filmed as Necromania). Stars Uschi Digard (playing three different characters) with Wood late-career regulars Lynn Harris and Neola Graef. In Wood's own words (in Wild Screen Reviews), "The Only House In Town is about lust, rape, crime, hate, sex, love, money, death, blood, lesbians, orgies, whores, bootleggers and ghosts. It is also the story of a house and what that house does to people's minds.” The film was lost for a long time and was only released in 2016, billed as an Ed Wood oddity. A 69-minute hardcore version is rumored to exist but still has not turned up.
1971	Necromania	Producer, Director, Screenwriter, Editor	The screenplay to this film was based on Wood's earlier novel The Only House; a married couple are having sexual problems and they decide to employ the assistance of a necromancer called Madame Heles and her assistant Tanya who conduct their business from a spooky haunted house. Wood worked Bela Lugosi's name into one line of dialogue as a homage. Stars Rene Bond, Ric Lutze, Maria Arnold and "Tanya". Maila Nurmi, who played Vampira in "Plan 9 from Outer Space" (1957), said she declined Wood's request to do a nude scene in the film while sitting up in a coffin, with the excuse that she was recovering from a stroke. Wood had a bit part in the film which was later edited out. The one-hour-long film was shot on 16 mm film for about $7,000 (two different versions were made simultaneously). This movie was long thought lost, but a copy of the softcore version surfaced first in 1992, then a hardcore version was discovered in an L.A. warehouse later by Wood biographer Rudolph Grey in 2001.
1971	Nympho Cycler	Director, screenwriter (uncredited), Actor	A sex-starved nympho named Misty leaves her transvestite weirdo husband and goes on the road with a violent motorcycle gang; Ed Wood acts in this film in the role of "Francis Edwards" (the weirdo husband), using the pseudonym 'TV Edwards'. Also stars Casey Larrain, Lottie Moore, Sherry Duz and Stud Stetson. A 37 minute version appears on the 2014 DVD "Ed Wood's Dirty Movies".
1971	The Young Marrieds	Screenwriter, Director	A pornographic film that was thought to be lost until a 52-minute print was discovered in 2004 in a projection room at the Venus Theatre in Vancouver, British Columbia. A man tries to loosen up his wife's inhibitions until he learns that she is even more sexually active than him. The print was edited by someone at the theatre to eliminate Wood's original "gay ending", but seems otherwise complete. Stars Dick Burns, Alice Friedland, George Black and Cynthia Walker. The full 61 minute version with gay ending intact appears on the 2014 DVD "Ed Wood's Dirty Movies"
1972	Panty Girls	Director (uncredited?)	Possibly directed by Ed Wood, since the film is about a salesman of women's underwear.
1972	The Class Reunion	Co-Screenwriter	This film was produced and directed by Stephen Apostolof and consists of an endless stream of people having sex after meeting at a class reunion event. It stars Rene Bond, Marsha Jordan, Ric Lutze, Flora Weisel and Sandy Carey.
1972	Shot On Location	Co-Screenwriter (uncredited?)	Stars Rick Lutze and Rene Bond; this is an adult film that Wood supposedly helped write, although his participation has still not been confirmed; the film is included nonetheless on the 2014 DVD "Ed Wood's Dirty Movies".
1972	The Undergraduate	Screenwriter	Produced by Jacques Descent (who produced Operation Redlight above); directed by John Flanders and written by Ed Wood; stars John Dullaghan, Billy Lane, Suzanne Fields, Lynn Holmes, Sunny Boyd. Plays more like a Sex Education film.
1972	The Cocktail Hostesses	Co-Screenwriter	Produced and directed by Stephen Apostolof. A young girl decides to become a cocktail hostess in order to improve her sex life. Stars Rene Bond, Cory Brandon, Terry Johnson, Rick Cassidy, Ric Lutze and Candy Samples.
1972	Drop-out Wife	Co-Screenwriter, Actor (bit part)	Also known as Pleasure Unlimited, this film was produced and directed by Stephen Apostolof. A young woman decides to enter the Swinging Scene and learns it is not as great as she thought it would be. Fans consider it one of Wood's best porno films. Stars Ric Lutze, Angela Carnon, Terry Johnson, Rick Cassidy, and Ed Wood in a bit part.
1973	The Snow Bunnies	Co-Screenwriter	Produced and directed by Stephen Apostolof, starring Rene Bond, Marsha Jordan, Terri Johnson, Sandy Carey, Ric Lutze. Three horny young girls hit the ski slopes looking for action.
1974	Fugitive Girls (a.k.a. Five Loose Women)	Co-Screenwriter, Assistant Director, Actor	Produced and directed by Stephen Apostolof. Ed Wood plays two roles in this film, "Pops" and The Sheriff (wearing sunglasses and a moustache). Stars Jamie Abercrombie, Rene Bond, and Talia Cochrane. There are at least three different VHS versions of this film. The version titled Fugitive Girls (a.k.a. Five Loose Women) appears to be the only complete one. (Hot on the Trail contains less sex, while Women's Penitentiary VIII features less plot.)
1975	The Encyclopedia of Sex	Co-Director, Co-Screenwriter (uncredited)	A series of twelve Super-8 mm sex education movies, all written and directed by Ed Wood and Charles Anderson. Their names never appear in the credits on any of these films.
1976	The Beach Bunnies	Co-Screenwriter	A.k.a. The Sun Bunnies, this film was produced and directed by Stephen Apostolof. Stars Rick Cassidy, Wendy Cavanaugh, Brenda Fogerty, Forman Shane and John Aquaboy.
1977	Meatcleaver Massacre	Co-Director with Keith Burns Under The Joint Pseudonym of Evan Lee	Notorious for having a prologue and epilogue narration by Christopher Lee that had been shot for another failed project and purchased for use in this film; Wood's actual involvement with this film is not 100% verified.
1984	Night of the Ghouls	Co-Producer, Director, Screenwriter, Film editor (uncredited)	This film was made in 1959 but was not distributed at that time. Kansas City film hobbyist-entrepreneur Wade Williams (1942-2023) managed to locate the film, paid the long overdue bills to the lab, and claimed full ownership of it. He also gave it its first home video release via VHS in 1984. This was the film's world premiere.
1993	Hellborn (a.k.a. Rock and Rock Hell)	Director, Screenwriter, Film editor, Actor	Wood and actor Conrad Brooks began shooting a film called Hellborn in the mid-1950s. They only shot ten minutes of the film before producer George Weiss abandoned the project, but a few scenes were later used as stock footage in Wood's films Night of the Ghouls and The Sinister Urge. The 1993 release called Hellborn collects the entire ten minutes of footage that they shot.
1993	Plan 69 From Outer Space (X-Rated)	loosely based on Ed Wood's 1957 cult classic	A hardcore adult parody of Plan 9 From Outer Space.
1994	Glen and Glenda (X-Rated)	loosely based on Ed Wood's 1953 Glen or Glenda	A hardcore adult re-telling of Glen or Glenda.
1994	Ed Wood	Based on the life story of Ed Wood	A biopic on Ed Wood's life, starring Johnny Depp and Martin Landau, directed by Tim Burton.
1995	Crossroads of Laredo	Director, screenwriter, actor (posthumously completed)	Originally shot in 1948 as The Streets of Laredo, this was the first film Wood shot. He wrote, directed and appeared in it, but the film was never completed in Wood's lifetime. Shot without a soundtrack, the final film was assembled with added narration and songs written by Ed's ex-girlfriend Dolores Fuller. It plays like a silent film with a sound effects track.
1995	Take It Out in Trade: The Outtakes	Director, screenwriter	In the 1990s, three reels of silent outtake footage from Wood's 1970 film Take It Out in Trade were discovered in the projection booth of a Santa Monica movie theatre containing bloopers, behind-the-scenes footage, deleted scenes, and alternative takes. The footage was released on DVD by Something Weird Video as Take It Out in Trade: The Outtakes.
1998	I Woke Up Early the Day I Died	Screenwriter (posthumously produced)	This film, based on Wood's unproduced 1974 script, stars Billy Zane and features performances from many established stars like Christina Ricci and John Ritter. Features Conrad Brooks, Kathy O'Hara Wood (Ed's widow) and Maila Nurmi in bit roles.
1999	Devil Girls	based on Ed Wood's 1967 novel	Independent production that adapts the 1967 Ed Wood novel, directed by Andre Perkowski; the film is about a girl gang that pulls off various crimes until they run afoul of Sheriff "Buck" Rhodes and a crime fighting clergyman named Reverend Steele. The film attempts to look and sound like a 1950s B Movie. Stars Stefanie Caterer and Paul Hoffman (72 minutes).
2013	The Vampire's Tomb	based on Ed Wood's 1954 screenplay	Completed in 2006, this extremely low-budget production adapts Ed Wood's unproduced screenplay, directed by Andre Perkowski; Wood initially wrote the script in 1954 with Bela Lugosi in mind for the lead role of Dr. Acula; features archival 1950s footage of The Amazing Criswell (77 minutes).

== Bibliography ==
- Hogan, David J. (1997), "Edward D. Wood, Jr", Dark Romance: Sexuality in the Horror Film, McFarland & Company, ISBN 978-0786462483
- Rhodes, Gary D.; Weaver, Tom (2015). Ed Wood's Bride of the Monster. BearManor Media. ISBN 978-1-59393-857-4.
- Weaver, Tom (2000), "Paul Marco", Return of the B Science Fiction and Horror Heroes: The Mutant Melding of Two Volumes of Classic Interviews, McFarland & Company, ISBN 978-0786407552
