= The Sinister Urge (film) =

1960 film by Ed Wood

- Theatrical release poster
- Directed by: Ed Wood
- Written by: Ed Wood
- Produced by: Ed Wood; Roy Reid
- Starring: Kenne Duncan; James "Duke" Moore; Jean Fontaine; Carl Anthony; Dino Fantini; Jeanne Willardson; Harvey B. Dunn; Reed Howes; Fred Mason; Conrad Brooks
- Cinematography: William C. Thompson
- Edited by: John Soh
- Music by: Manuel Francisco
- Distributed by: Headliner Productions
- Release date: December 8, 1960
- Running time: 71 min
- Country: United States
- Language: English
- Budget: $20,125 (estimated)

The Sinister Urge is a 1960 crime drama film that was written, directed and co-produced by Ed Wood. It starred Kenne Duncan, Duke Moore, Dino Fantini, Jean Fontaine, Harvey Dunn and Conrad Brooks. Wood originally wrote the script under the working title The Racket Queen

The film was featured in season 6, episode 13 of the cult television show Mystery Science Theater 3000 after the short educational film Keeping Clean and Neat.

== Plot ==
Police Lieutenant Matt Carson and his associate, Sergeant Randy Stone, arrive at a crime scene in the local park. While viewing the body of a young woman in her underwear, they list off similarities to previous murders in the park and suspect a connection to the local "smut picture racket."

In the studio of pornographic director Jaffe, his superior Johnny Ryde brings orders from their boss, Gloria Henderson. She wants their smut inventory moved to a safer location than Jaffe's storeroom. Jaffe promises to do so after finishing that day's shoot. After Johnny leaves, the police raid his studio, arrest everyone, and seize all the films and pictures.

Carson and Stone are berated by their superior, demanding quicker action in exposing the racket. Local businessman Mr. Romaine visits the two officers, asking why taxpayers' money is being wasted on persecuting pornography, which he views as harmless compared to juvenile gangs and violent crime. Carson claims that the dirty picture racket is connected to all major crimes. He shows Romaine pictures of the murder victims and explains the connection between their work and their violent deaths. Shaken, Romaine leaves.

Gloria is visited by Johnny, who informs her of the recent police raid. Their conversation reveals the woman at the beginning of the film was killed by their lackey Dirk for attempting to blackmail Gloria. Johnny states that he is worried about Dirk since he clearly enjoys killing with his knife. Their talk moves to their teenage customers' demand for new bondage photos.

At Jake's Pizza Joint, teenagers enjoy themselves when one man challenges another to a fight. The fight moves outside. Dirk observes from afar. Back inside, Jake negotiates the purchase of more smut pictures from Janet, an agent of the pornography ring. He complains about the inventory of photos he already has and demands new ones. Janet assures him new ones are coming and asks him to keep the old ones at the restaurant until they can make a trade. Outside, Dirk tires of the fight and calls the police before fleeing. While responding to the call, the police find Jake's smut supply and arrest him along with the two fighting men, revealed to be rival smut peddlers fighting over the right to sell to Jake.

At Gloria's house she and Johnny watch 16 mm films and discuss Dirk. Gloria points out that the increasingly unstable Dirk is triggered to kill by viewing pornography. Johnny claims that he can still keep the killer under control. Meanwhile, Dirk has returned to the park. He is flirting with a woman, and the two kiss, but then he strips off her clothes and stabs her to death.

In the police station, Carson and Stone talk about the type of women who get mixed up in pornography rackets. The film follows the path of a young woman named Mary Smith. Unable to find legitimate film work, she accepts an offer from Johnny Ryde. One day she is called to "audition" for a hostile Gloria, who reveals that Mary's debt to her can only be paid off by working for her. Mary ends up in Jaffe's studio posing for cheesecake photos, where Jaffe states she'll soon be in pornography. She is later murdered in the park by Dirk, who found her pictures after breaking into Gloria's house. He accidentally leaves the photos behind, and the police trace his identity through his fingerprints. With Dirk's name in the paper, Gloria's bosses in "the Syndicate" visit her to demand Dirk's murder before he gets them into more trouble.

Gloria wants to kill Dirk directly, but Johnny suggests sending Dirk on an errand in a car with faulty brakes so that it appears he had a car accident. The next day, Dirk goes back to the park to stalk another victim. The woman he chooses is actually Officer Kline, disguised as a woman on orders from Carson. While Kline successfully subdues Dirk, Johnny arrives just in time and knocks Kline out. Dirk agrees he needs to leave town and drives off in the faulty car. When the brakes fail, Dirk survives his "accident" by leaping out of the vehicle.

Out for revenge, Dirk makes it to Gloria's house. He manages to ambush an arriving Johnny, who claims it was Gloria's idea to kill him. He explains that the two men could replace Gloria as ringleaders as soon as they access her Syndicate contacts. Dirk hides outside as Gloria arrives. Johnny informs her Dirk is alive. He demands he be treated as an equal to Gloria, asking to meet her contacts in The Syndicate. Gloria seemingly agrees and goes to change clothes. Dirk then stabs Johnny in the backyard. Gloria comes back and shoots Dirk, mistaking him for Johnny because of the darkness. She calls the police with a story about how Dirk shot Johnny and then ran away, but they arrest her when they discover both bodies.

== Cast ==
- Kenne Duncan as Lt. Matt Carson
- James "Duke" Moore as Sgt. Randy Stone
- Carl Anthony as Johnny Ryde
- Dino Fantini as Dirk Williams
- Jean Fontaine as Gloria Henderson
- Conrad Brooks as Connie
- Harvey B. Dunn as Mr. Romaine
- Harry Keatan as Jaffe
- Reed Howes as Police Inspector
- Fred Mason as Officer Kline
- Ed Wood as rival pornography distributor in fistfight (stock footage from Wood's unfinished Hellborn)
- Vic McGee as Syndicate man
- Jeanne Willardson as Mary Smith

== Production and analysis ==
In 1959, Ed Wood completed a screenplay titled The Racket Queen. Producer Roy Reid of Headliner Productions was willing to fund the project, though Wood had to revise his script in early 1960. The result was The Sinister Urge, which was filmed primarily in July 1960. The film project was influenced by a box office hit of the time, Psycho (June 1960) by Alfred Hitchcock. Both films were about sexually motivated psychopaths, and Reid and Wood likely aimed to capitalize on the similarity of their concepts. Dino Fantini, who played the psycho killer in the film, said Ed Wood picked him for the role at an audition he and the other students participated in at the acting school they were enrolled at (he was only 18 at the time).

Rob Craig suggests that the film can be seen as an early entry in a new subgenre of exploitation films, the so-called "roughies". These were sexually oriented films which featured sexual violence towards women. This 1960s subgenre was itself derivative of Psycho. The primary position of the film is that there is a connection between pornography and violence against women. The film in fact suggests one is the cause, and the other the effect. Similar positions have since appeared in sociological writings, such as Pornography: Men Possessing Women (1981) by Andrea Dworkin.

The opening scene offers the sight of an attractive woman to the gaze of the, presumably male, audience. The connection between the dark vicarious thrills of a film audience and that of an actual voyeur was both suggested and further explored by Psycho and Peeping Tom (1960).

Craig suggests that Officer Kline serves as a stand-in for Officer Kelton, a recurring character in Wood films. The main difference between the two characters being that Kelton served as a comic relief, while Kline seems humorless—perhaps because comic relief would seem out of place in a film about violent sexual death.

The inventory of films captured in the police raid is represented by the image of a motion picture editing room, containing numerous film cans. Craig suggests that the scene may depict the actual editing room where Wood edited his films.

The film includes a fight scene Wood shot for his unfinished project Hellborn, a.k.a. Rock and Roll Hell. The scene is edited to include footage of Dino Fantini's character observing the events and some additional dialogue audio to connect the scene to the film's plot. The same fight scene was also used in another of Wood's films, Night of the Ghouls.

In a certain scene, Johnny Ryde reflects on the path of his career. "I look at this slush, and I try to remember, at one time, I made good movies." Craig suggests that voices the self-reflection of Wood. He started out trying to create serious science fiction films and horror films, only to be reduced to making a sexploitation film. There is some irony in the fact that the film is apparently meant to decry pornography, since most of Ed Wood's later works, such as Take It Out in Trade, Necromania and The Young Marrieds, were to some degree pornographic.

The cautionary tale concerning aspiring actresses is similar to Hollywood Rat Race (1964), a book written by Wood. The office of Johnny Ryde is decorated with the movie posters of four previous Wood productions: Jail Bait (1954), Bride of the Monster (1955), The Violent Years (1956), and Plan 9 from Outer Space (1959).

Craig finds that the film functions well as an "engaging and coherent" melodrama, as a work of social criticism, and as a treatise against the exploitation of women. All this was accomplished with a Skid Row budget of 20,000 dollars. Wood's director's salary was $2,600.00, and the combined salaries of all the cast members was $3,020.00. Dino Fantini recalled that the film premiered in Palmdale, California where Wood had some of the actors appear in person and sign autographs for the fans who attended. He added that it played for 13 consecutive weeks at a particular theatre on 42nd Street in New York City.

He notes this was the swan song for cinematographer William C. Thompson, who was losing his eyesight. For Wood himself, it was his last mainstream work as both writer and director. He would subsequently write screenplays for other exploitation films and direct pornographic films.

In 1960, Wood wrote a screenplay called The Peeper, which was supposed to be a sequel to The Sinister Urge, also starring Kenne Duncan and Duke Moore, but the project never got off the ground.

== Critical reception ==
Writing in AllMovie, critic Fred Beldin described the film as "cynical, bad-tempered [and] filled with sex killers and pornographers whom Wood condemns even as he exploits them," but added that "fans of Wood's better known films will find plenty to enjoy in The Sinister Urge. The same bizarre dialogue, flimsy production values, and sly autobiographical touches ('At one time I made good movies,' complains Johnny, a director reduced to illicit stags) that make Wood's films delirious and endearing are all here." Critic Dennis Schwartz described it as an "amusing film for those who prefer bad films over good ones" that was "ineptly shot and acted, which only adds to its perverse charm."

== See also ==
- Ed Wood filmography
- List of American films of 1960

== Bibliography ==
- The Haunted World of Edward D. Wood, Jr. (1996), documentary film directed by Brett Thompson
- Rudolph Grey, Nightmare of Ecstasy: The Life and Art of Edward D. Wood, Jr. (1992) ISBN 978-0-922915-24-8
- Craig, Rob (2009), "The Sinister Urge (1960)", Ed Wood, Mad Genius: A Critical Study of the Films, McFarland & Company, ISBN 978-0786454235
