= Take It Out in Trade: The Outtakes =

Take it Out in Trade: The Outtakes
- Video box
- Directed by: Edward D. Wood, Jr.
- Written by: Edward D. Wood, Jr.
- Starring: Edward D. Wood, Jr. Duke Moore; Nona Carver
- Cinematography: Hal Guthu
- Edited by: Edward D. Wood, Jr. Michael J. Sheridan
- Distributed by: Something Weird Video
- Release date: January 1995
- Country: United States

Take It Out in Trade: The Outtakes is a compilation film of bloopers, alternate takes, behind-the-scenes footage, and deleted scenes from the 1970 soft-core pornographic film, Take It Out in Trade, directed by Ed Wood. The footage is completely silent with an instrumental musical score.

== History ==
Take It Out in Trade was written and directed by Wood during his long downward spiral into alcoholism and pornography. Long (though disputedly) believed to be a lost film, three cans of outtake footage were found in the projection booth of a Santa Monica movie theatre and released on VHS by Something Weird Video in 1995 as Take It Out in Trade: The Outtakes. Rudolph Grey, the author of Wood biography Nightmare of Ecstasy (1992), claimed he located a print during research for his book. The outtakes were the only commercially available footage from the production for over twenty years, until the full 80-minute film's recovery, restoration and release on Blu-ray in 2018. The eventual home video release was sourced from a 16mm theatrical print and scanned by the American Genre Film Archive (AGFA).

== See also ==
- Ed Wood filmography
