= Live at Glenn Miller Café =

Live at Glenn Miller Café may refer to:

- Live at Glenn Miller Café (Arthur Doyle and Sunny Murray album), 2001
- Live at Glenn Miller Café Vol 1, a 2002 album by Jemeel Moondoc
- Live at the Glenn Miller Café, a 1999 album by the AALY Trio and Ken Vandermark
