= The Young Marrieds (film) =

1971 film by Ed Wood

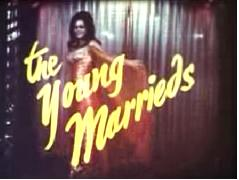
Screenshot of The Young Marrieds

The Young Marrieds (1972) is a pornographic film written and directed by Ed Wood. Reportedly, this was made after Necromania, and is thought to be Wood's last film (as director) before his death.

== Preservation ==
Previously thought lost, a 16 mm print was discovered by Dimitrios Otis, a researcher of historic adult films in Vancouver, British Columbia, in 2004. The film was released on DVD by Alpha Blue Archives on August 1, 2014 and by After Hours Cinema on November 18, 2014.

== See also ==
- Ed Wood filmography
- List of rediscovered films

== Bibliography ==
- The Haunted World of Edward D. Wood, Jr. (1996), documentary film directed by Brett Thompson
- Rudolph Grey, Nightmare of Ecstasy: The Life and Art of Edward D. Wood, Jr. (1992) ISBN 978-0-922915-24-8
