= Songwriter (disambiguation) =

A songwriter is an individual who writes both the lyrics and music to a song.

Songwriter may also refer to:

- Songwriter (Justin Hayward album)
- Songwriter (Apo Hiking Society album)
- Songwriter (Bill Anderson album)
- Songwriter (Richard Marx album)
- Songwriter (Johnny Cash album)
- The Songwriter, an album by Arthur Doyle
- Songwriter (film), a 1984 film directed by Alan Rudolph
