= Arthur Doyle =

American musician

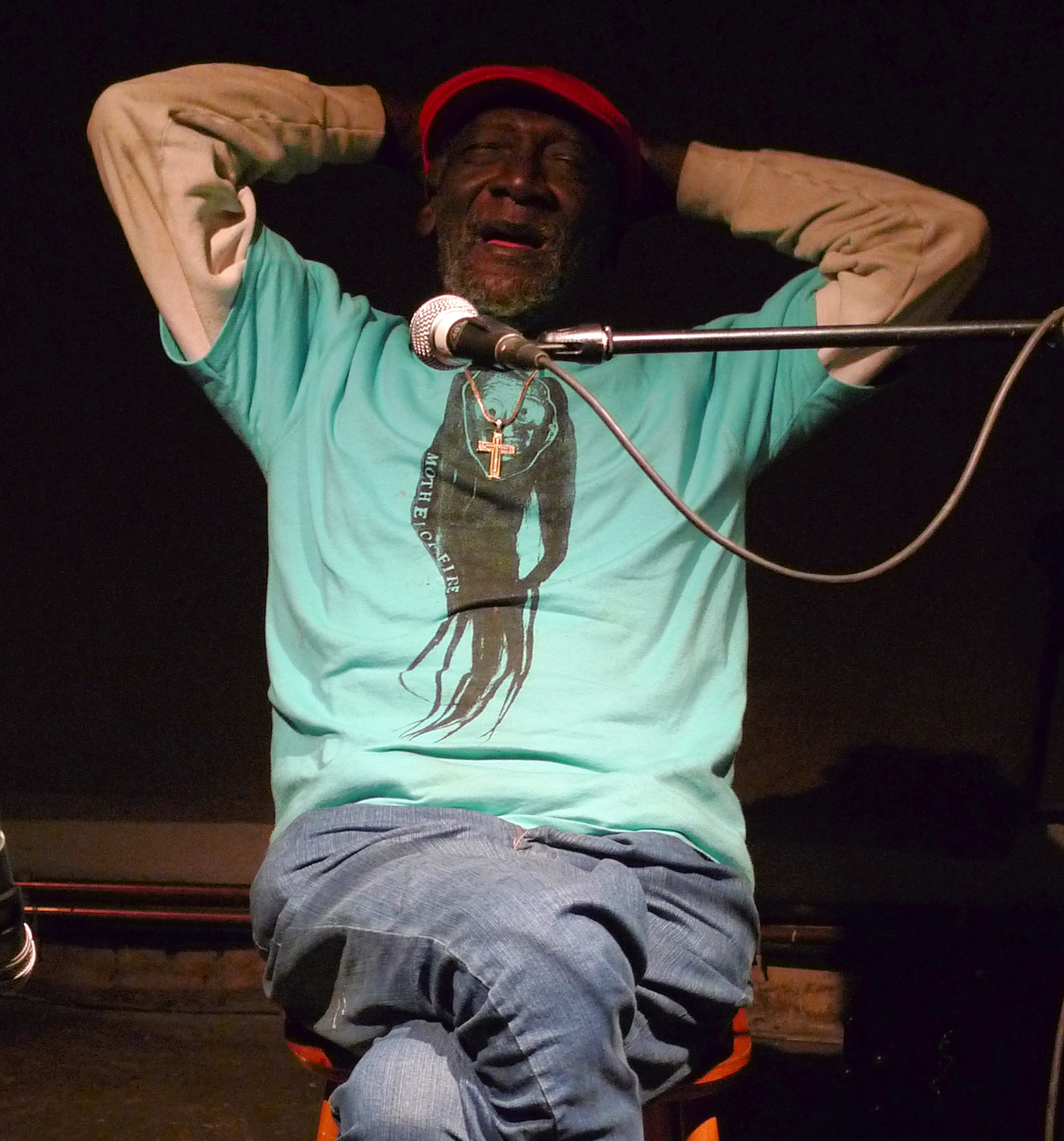
- Doyle in 2011

Background information
- Born: June 26, 1944
- Origin: Birmingham, Alabama, United States
- Died: January 25, 2014 (aged 69)
- Genres: Free jazz, avant-garde jazz
- Occupations: Musician, composer
- Instruments: Tenor saxophone, flute, recorder, bass clarinet, piano, vocals
- Formerly of: Noah Howard, Milford Graves, Rudolph Grey, The Blue Humans

Arthur Doyle (June 26, 1944 – January 25, 2014) was an American jazz saxophonist, bass clarinettist, flutist, and vocalist who was best known for playing what he called "free jazz soul music". Writer Phil Freeman described him as having "one of the fiercest, most unfettered saxophone styles in all of jazz", "a player so explosive that it seems like microphones and recording equipment can barely contain him".

== Biography ==
Arthur Doyle was born in Birmingham, Alabama, in 1944, and was inspired to play music as child after watching Louis Armstrong and Duke Ellington on television. During his high school years, he began listening to Miles Davis, John Coltrane and Sonny Rollins, and picked up gigs as a saxophonist. While still a teenager, he played with saxophonist Otto Ford and trumpeter Walter Miller (an associate of Sun Ra), and also played in R&B and blues groups.

After graduating high school, Doyle attended Tennessee State University in Nashville, receiving a degree in Music Education. While in Nashville, he played with trumpeter and Horace Silver associate Louis Smith and singers Gladys Knight and Donny Hathaway. He also briefly went to Detroit to play with hard bop trumpeter Charles Moore. During this time, he became involved in civil rights protests. Although he was at first uninterested in free jazz, he gradually gravitated toward it after playing at a Black Panthers festival, having developed a sound that was "raw and unpolished, charged with vocal glossolalia arrived at by using a soft reed and singing through the horn".

In 1968, Doyle moved to New York City, where he worked with Sun Ra and Bill Dixon, and met and befriended saxophonist Pharoah Sanders and guitarist Sonny Sharrock. The following year, he appeared on Noah Howard's album The Black Ark. While in New York, Doyle met drummer Milford Graves, who encouraged him to pursue his natural affinity for pure sound. In 1976, he and saxophonist Hugh Glover played on Graves's album Bäbi, released the following year. In 1977, he recorded Alabama Feeling, his first album as a leader. In the late 1970s, Doyle also began playing with guitarist Rudolph Grey, often in noisy duo settings, and performing in clubs such as Max's Kansas City. In 1980, Doyle, Grey, and drummer Beaver Harris, together known as The Blue Humans, recorded Live NY 1980.

At around this time, Doyle began struggling with anxiety issues, and moved to Endicott, New York, where he worked as a counselor. In 1981, he moved to Paris, where he began an association with multi-instrumentalist Alan Silva and his Celestrial Communication Orchestra, and participating in the recording of the album Desert Mirage in 1982. The following year, while in France, he was accused of rape and imprisoned. He maintained his innocence, and was pardoned and released in 1988. During his time in prison, he wrote over 150 songs and assembled what he called the Arthur Doyle Songbook.

In the early 1990s, Doyle returned to the United States, moving back to Endicott, and restarted his involvement in music. He resumed his association with Grey, playing at CBGB and releasing Arthur Doyle Plays and Sings from the Songbook Volume One on Grey's Audible Hiss label. Doyle also came to the attention of Thurston Moore, who described him as "spitting out incredible post-Aylerisms... Mystic music which took on the air of chasing ghosts and spirits through halls of mirrors", and who would release two of Doyle's albums (More Alabama Feeling (1993) and The Songwriter (1995)) on his Ecstatic Peace! label. (Moore's band Sonic Youth would later pay tribute to Doyle in their song "Kim Gordon and the Arthur Doyle Hand Cream", which appeared on their 2004 album Sonic Nurse.)

Over the next decade, Doyle toured and recorded extensively, releasing over a dozen albums on small labels. During this time, he played and recorded with drummers Hamid Drake, Sabu Toyozumi, and Sunny Murray, among others, and formed The Arthur Doyle Electro-Acoustic Ensemble. Doyle spent his final years in his home town of Birmingham. He was the subject of a 2012 documentary titled The Life, Love and Hate of a Free Jazz Man and His Woman, written and directed by Jorge Torres-Torres. He died on January 25, 2014, in Alabama.

== Musical style ==
Doyle was known for his "wild, full-blast playing" and for his unique sound, which resulted from what one writer called his having "approach(ed) his instruments in a manner that makes the term 'idiosyncratic' seem painfully inept." Dave Cross wrote: "His sound is a mixture of African folk song delicacy and pure Albert Ayler overload. His vocal style (both as pure element and incorporated into his sax and flute styling) is unidentifiable and seemingly from an alternate (jazz) world." Doyle reflected: "I had this reed on that was too soft and my voice came through my saxophone. I liked the sound so I began singing and playing at the same time." He also began to alternate playing with singing, shouting, scatting, and chanting, referring to his style as "free jazz soul music". He explained: "You can't separate the singing from the saxophone, you can't separate the flute from the saxophone, you can't separate none of it from the saxophone. It all revolves around one instrument and that is Me, Myself."

Doyle was also known for the poor quality of some of his recordings, a number of which were created on a portable cassette recorder. Alabama Feeling was described as having been "recorded in fidelity that would make garage punk aficionados wince", while More Alabama Feeling was "raw, with pause button slams, Doyle muttering incomprehensibly, multiple takes of shrieking sax power lift..."

In a tribute following Doyle's death, Jon Dale wrote: "if anything, the crudeness, the rudeness of the recordings posit these albums as exalted and exultant documents of deeply personal expression... At his greatest, Doyle was a pure energy source – a thousand shafts of light vaulting out from the breath-sax nexus, and one great, pure and soulful voice, crying deep from the maw, its deceptive simplicity paradoxically singing out the complexity of life on this old earth. And now he's gone, and I don't think we'll see many like him again."

== Discography ==
=== As leader ===
Release Year	Recording Year	Album	Label	Notes
1978	1977	Alabama Feeling	AK-BA	Debut as leader
1993	1990	More Alabama Feeling	Ecstatic Peace!	
1995	1992	Plays and Sings from the Songbook Volume 1	Audible Hiss	Solo album
1995	1994	The Songwriter	Ecstatic Peace!	Solo album
1995	1995	Love Ship / Mama Love Papa Love	Audible Hiss	7" single
1996	1995	Live at the Cooler	The Lotus Sound	With Rudolph Grey on guitar.
1997	1997	Do the Breakdown	Ain-Soph	Solo album
1998	1997	Live In Japan Doing The Breakdown	Yokoto Music	
2000	1999	A Prayer for Peace	Zugswang	
2000	1999	Egg Head	Hell's Half Halo	7" single
2000	2000	Dawn of a New Vibration	Fractal	With Sunny Murray
2001	1999	Plays the African Love Call	Ecstatic YOD	With the Arthur Doyle Electro-Acoustic Ensemble
2001	2000	Live at Glenn Miller Cafe	Ayler	With Sunny Murray
2002	2000	Live at the Dorsch Gallery	Carbon	
2002	2002	Conspiracy Nation	Qbico	With the Arthur Doyle Electro-Acoustic Ensemble
2003	1997	Live in Japan, 1997	Qbico	With Takashi Mizutani/Sabu Toyozumi
2003	2001	The Basement Tapes	Durto	With Edward Perraud/Dan Warburton
2004	2004	National Conspiracy	Carbon	Remix of pre-recorded and live material
2004	2003	Your Spirit is Calling	Qbico	With Hamid Drake
2005	1989/2004	No More Crazy Women	Qbico	
2005	2005	No More Evil Women Tour	Carbon	
2006	2004	Patriotic Act	Qbico	With the Arthur Doyle Electro-Acoustic Ensemble
2007	2006/2007	Bushman Yoga	Ruby Red Editora	With Arthur Doyle's Free Jazz Soul Orchestra
2010	1980	Ghosts II	Foreign Frequency	7" single (with Rudolph Grey on guitar)
2011	2004	Live In Nashville & Louisville	Sagittarius A-Star	With the Arthur Doyle Electro-Acoustic Ensemble
2012	2011	In Solo	8mm Records	
2016	2012	First House	Amish Records	
2017	2000	Live at the Tunnel	Sinner Lady Gloria	With Sunny Murray

=== As sideman ===
Release Year	Recording Year	Artist	Album	Label
1972	1969	Noah Howard	The Black Ark	Freedom Records
1977	1976	Milford Graves	Bäbi	IPS
1982	1982	Alan Silva and the Celestrial Communication Orchestra	Desert Mirage	IAPC
1988	1988	Rudolph Grey	Transfixed	New Alliance
1995	1989	Sun Ra	Someday My Prince Will Come - Second Star To The Right: Salute to Walt Disney	Leo
1995	1980	The Blue Humans	Live NY 1980	Audible Hiss
2002	2002	Konx	Wholy Ghost	Eyedrum
2023	1976	Milford Graves	Children of the Forest	Black Editions Archive
