= Arthur Doyle Plays and Sings from the Songbook Volume One =

Studio album by Arthur Doyle
- Released: 1995
- Recorded: 1992
- Genre: Free jazz
- Label: Audible Hiss; AH 004

Arthur Doyle Plays and Sings from the Songbook Volume One is a solo album by saxophonist Arthur Doyle. It was recorded in 1992, and was released in 1995 by Audible Hiss. The album features music from the "Arthur Doyle Songbook," written during his five-year imprisonment in France. It was recorded using a portable cassette machine.

== Reception ==
Professional ratings
Review scores
Source	Rating
AllMusic	3/5 stars
The Penguin Guide to Jazz	3/4 stars

In a review for AllMusic, Dan Warburton wrote: "'Yo Yoo>Yo Yoo'... and "Hey Minnie Hey Wilbur Hey Mingus" are solo tenor saxophone tracks featuring his distinctive smeared sonority... rendered even grittier here by the atrocious homemade cassette recording. On 'Ozy Lady Dozy Lady'... Doyle accompanies himself on the family piano, as he does on 'Flue Song' (the recording, though decidedly lo-fi, also captures what sounds like fingernails on the keys) before switching to recorder halfway through. After 'Just Get the Funk Spot,' which features the most energetic free blowing on the album, the final 'Goverey' references Doyle's early R&B background... and brings the proceedings to a touching close."

Clifford Allen, writing for Tiny Mix Tapes, stated that, on the album, "there are views of an artistic figure whose specificity plays to the universal, and that's part of what makes Doyle's solo work so unique." He commented: "It isn't polished or pretty, and its delicate, personal expression can be a lot to bear — even for someone weaned on the avant-garde. Doyle's songs occupy a special place outside any pantheon, yet their realness is shocking and captivating."

The editors of MusicHound Jazz: The Essential Album Guide called the recording "one of the most disturbingly open jazz albums ever."

== Track listing ==
All compositions by Arthur Doyle.

1. "Ozy Lady Dozy Lady" – 8:26
2. "Yo Yoo>Yo Yoo" – 5:21
3. "Olca Cola In Angola" – 10:34
4. "Hey Minnie Hey Wilbur Hey Mingus" – 3:28
5. "Flue Song" – 9:30
6. "Just Get The Funk Spot" – 5:14
7. "Goverey" – 3:55

== Personnel ==
- Arthur Doyle – tenor saxophone, flute, piano, voice
