= Alabama Feeling =

Live album by Arthur Doyle
- Released: 1978
- Recorded: November 11, 1977
- Studios: The Brook, New York City
- Genre: Jazz
- Length: 37:57
- Label: Dra / Ak-Ba

Alabama Feeling is an album by American jazz saxophonist Arthur Doyle, recorded in 1977 at The Brook, a loft near Union Square in New York City, which Doyle had rented. It was produced by Doyle's Dra Records, and initially released in 1978 on Charles Tyler's Ak-Ba label in a limited LP pressing of 1000. It was transferred to CD format in 1998 by Wharton Tiers and reissued on Dra Records, and was also reissued in Germany in 2009 on the Rank And File label. His first recording as leader, it features Doyle on "tenor voice-o-phone" (tenor saxophone), "bass voice-o-net" (bass clarinet), and flute, along with trombonist Charles Stephens, electric bassist Richard Williams, and drummers Bruce Moore and Rashied Sinan. (The band is referred to as "Arthur Doyle Plus 4".)

== Reception ==
Professional ratings
Review scores
Source	Rating
AllMusic	4.5/5 stars

In an AllMusic review, Dan Warburton awarded the album 4.5 stars, and wrote that it "pounds the listener into the ground with thrilling energy, playing easily on a par with classic albums on labels such as ESP and BYG Actuel." Warburton also acknowledged the album's "dreadful sound quality" but concluded: "Connoisseurs of Sun Ra... have long been prepared to forego quality sound in the name of great music, and any listener prepared to do the same will not be disappointed." In a review for Red Bull Music Academy, Jon Dale called Alabama Feeling "a particularly staggering set of fearless group improvisation", and wrote that it was "surprising for some of the instrumental approaches, particularly with the electric bass. While in a jazz context, this often screams 'fusion,' Richard Williams’s grunting attack on the instrument is unhooked from formal constraints, playing with all the unchecked rawness and limber physicality of Doyle's roaring, gutbucket sax, and the sea-sick whinnying of Charles Stephens' trombone. The way Doyle and Stephens move from splayed torrents of rapid-fire notes to long, drawn-out, revenant moans, gasping for air while tones intermingle and cross-cut in the air, makes for some of the most thrilling free playing of its time."

In an article for Perfect Sound Forever, Dave Cross wrote: "the record was a screaming, raw continuation to a now completely out of style music. Free jazz in 1978? Please. The band is wild, loose and free and Doyle is completely off the hook. The performance of electric bass man Richard Williams is totally nuts, and at times comes close to upstaging Doyle... What a band, what a great recording, totally removed from time." Bradford Bailey, writing for The Hum, called Alabama Feeling "one of the fiercest documents of Free-Jazz. It is a brick to the face. A howling storm of creative energy called forth from all of the anger raging within the African American community at the time. It is the sound of revolution and retribution. It's an album that forever stays in my listening stack and rarely returns to the shelves. Doyle was a player of remarkable energy and dexterity. His presence and importance during the era is often overlooked. If you want to find out how punk Free-Jazz was, this is the place to start."

Phil Freeman, writing for Burning Ambulance, stated: "there's something viscerally thrilling about a player so explosive that it seems like microphones and recording equipment can barely contain him... Recorded in fidelity that would make garage punk aficionados wince, the album is a blistering assault that nevertheless retains its power no matter how many times you play it, something that can't be said of very many albums, regardless of genre." Thurston Moore included Alabama Feeling in his "Top Ten From The Free Jazz Underground" list, first published in 1995 in the second issue of the defunct Grand Royal Magazine. Moore called the album a "lo-fi masterpiece" and a "spiraling cry of freedom and fury", stating that Doyle made "mystic music which took on the air of chasing ghosts and spirits through halls of mirrors". (Moore's record label Ecstatic Peace! released Doyle's followup album More Alabama Feeling in 1993.) Clifford Allen called the album "raw and quite fuzz-laden in fidelity", having "an almost ethnographically field-recorded vibe, as though energy music and free improvisation could be documented as an expressionistic ritual". He wrote: "Although it may at first seem like an utterly white-hot mass of sound, Alabama Feeling ebbs and flows with a natural, conversational quality, in which soupy funk and charged energy playing are equal partners."

== Track listing ==
All compositions by Arthur Doyle

1. "November 8th Or 9th - I Can't Remember When" - 4:04
2. "Something For Caserlo, Larry, & Irma" - 3:36
3. "A Little Linda, Debra, Omita, Barry & Maria" - 9:01
4. "Ancestor" - 7:22
5. "Mother Image, Father Image" - 6:02
6. "Development" - 7:52
  1. "BaBi Music For Milford & Huge"
  2. "Alabama Soul For Arthur"
  3. "Ramie & Master Charles Of The Trombone"

- Recorded at The Brook, New York City on November 11, 1977

== Personnel ==
- Arthur Doyle - "tenor voice-o-phone" (tenor saxophone), "bass voice-o-net" (bass clarinet), flute
- Charles Stephens - trombone
- Richard Williams - Fender bass
- Bruce Moore - drums
- Rashied Sinan - drums
