= Take It Out in Trade =

- Directed by: Ed Wood
- Written by: Ed Wood
- Produced by: Edward Ashdown; Richard Gonzalez
- Starring: Ed Wood; Duke Moore; Nona Carver; Michael Donovan O'Donnell; Linda Colpin
- Cinematography: Hal Guthu
- Edited by: Ed Wood
- Distributed by: Ashdown-Gonzalez Productions
- Release date: 1970
- Running time: 80 minutes
- Country: United States
- Language: English

Take It Out in Trade is a 1970 softcore pornographic comedy, written, directed and edited by Ed Wood. The plot centers on a couple who hire a private investigator to locate their missing daughter. He finds her in a "house of ill-repute," full of various soft-core couplings. Ed Wood played a transvestite named Alecia in the film.

Ed Wood's widow Kathy remarked in 1992, "It was a cute little film that he cut and edited in his den on a moviola. He used some of our neighbors. Kenne Duncan's old girlfriend Nona Carver played an old whore, Sleazy Maizie Rumpledink. He wasn't really making any money out of it. He never did." Nona Carver said "We made it in Lakewood, in some private home, in about two days...There were two versions of the film, I think one had quite a bit of pornographic business in it, and there was one that didn't..... In the film this guy comes in, starts beating me up, and I scream and cry. Evidently, it sounded so real the police came!" Sci-fi film director Ron Ashcroft commented that he watched Wood edit some of the film in his den, and did not think that he was that competent at editing from what he saw.

Long believed to be a lost film, a single complete 80-minute 16mm release print from the archive of Something Weird Video was digitally scanned and screened in 2017, followed by a Blu-ray release in 2018.

== Cast ==
- Nona Carver - Sleazy Maisie Rumpledinck
- Duke Moore - Frank Riley
- Michael Donovan O'Donnell - Mac McGregor
- Donna Stanley - Shirley Riley
- Ed Wood - Alecia, a transvestite
- Linda Colpin
- Monica Gayle

Apart from The Amazing Criswell (who appeared in Orgy of the Dead), Duke Moore is the only one of Wood's stable of actors from his 1950s films to appear in one of his sexploitation films. Nona Carver was a girlfriend of Wood regular Kenne Duncan.

== Unavailability ==
Take It Out in Trade was commonly believed to be a lost film, but a full 80-minute print was publicly exhibited at Anthology Film Archives in New York City in September 2014. In Nightmare of Ecstasy, his 1992 biography of Ed Wood, Rudolph Grey claimed to have discovered a rare copy during his research. He reported that the film has "psychedelic touches," with red being dominant in the film's visual scheme.

The website of Something Weird Video also claims that it is not a lost film. In the 1990s, three reels of silent outtake footage was discovered in the projection booth of a Santa Monica movie theatre containing bloopers, behind-the-scenes footage, deleted scenes, and alternative takes. The footage was released on VHS in 1995 by Something Weird Video as Take It Out in Trade: The Outtakes, and later made available on DVD and via download.

On 25 September 2017, a 2K transfer of the film was presented as a "Secret Screening" at the 2017 Fantastic Fest. The screening ignited controversy as it took place during the fallout of a sexual harassment scandal involving festival personnel. In October 2017, Alamo Drafthouse exhibited the film to a "surprise" audience who had not been told about the film or its subject ahead of time.

== Home release ==
On 31 July 2018, it was announced that Take It Out in Trade would be released on Blu-ray via the American Genre Film Archive (AGFA). It contains the new 2K transfer, as well as special features, including commentary by filmmaker Frank Henenlotter, Ed Wood's biographer Rudolph Grey, and AGFA's Joseph A. Ziemba, 70 minutes of outtakes, liner notes by Grey, a bonus film The Love Feast (also in new 2K transfer), and reversible cover art. The set was released on 13 November 2018.

== See also ==
- Ed Wood filmography
