= Do the Breakdown =

Studio album by Arthur Doyle
- Released: 1997
- Recorded: April 20, 1997
- Genre: Free jazz
- Label: Ain Soph

Do the Breakdown is a solo album by saxophonist Arthur Doyle. It was recorded in April 1997, and was released later that year by the Ain Soph label. The album features music from the "Arthur Doyle Songbook," written during his five-year imprisonment in France. It was recorded using a portable cassette machine, and was intended to coincide with his tour of Japan in the fall of 1997. That tour yielded the album Live in Japan Doing the Breakdown (Yokoto Music, 1998).

== Reception ==
Professional ratings
Review scores
Source	Rating
AllMusic	2.5/5 stars
The Penguin Guide to Jazz	2/4 stars

In a review for AllMusic, Brian Flota wrote: "If there is a thin line between being a visionary and merely being a lolling lush, Arthur Doyle's Do the Breakdown easily exists on both sides of the divide... This was recorded in one day, and it sounds like it. But it is a hunch that it would have none of the charm, spontaneity, or wit that it does if one day more was spent working on it."

The authors of the Penguin Guide to Jazz Recordings commented that the album "has the lo-fi feel of a field recording, and has a certain shambolic power."

Clifford Allen, writing for Tiny Mix Tapes, stated that, on the album, "there are views of an artistic figure whose specificity plays to the universal, and that's part of what makes Doyle's solo work so unique." He commented: "It isn't polished or pretty, and its delicate, personal expression can be a lot to bear — even for someone weaned on the avant-garde. Doyle's songs occupy a special place outside any pantheon, yet their realness is shocking and captivating."

== Track listing ==
All compositions by Arthur Doyle.

1. "Breakdown Take 1" – 7:02
2. "Breakdown Take 2" – 6:19
3. "Street Player" – 10:01
4. "African Queen" – 8:01
5. "Alabama Feeling" – 2:35
6. "Battle of Jericho" – 3:57
7. "He Exists" – 2:00

== Personnel ==
- Arthur Doyle – tenor saxophone, flute, voice
