= Crossroad Avenger =

1953 film by Ed Wood

Crossroad Avenger is a 1953 Western film intended to serve as a television pilot. It was directed by Ed Wood (who also wrote the script) and served as a star vehicle for Tom Keene. Keene had become known as a star of B movie Westerns in the 1930s and 1940s, but was experiencing a downturn in his career in the 1950s. Wood served as both writer and director. He also had a small acting role as a Pony Express rider.

The film lasts 25 minutes. The series failed to find a buyer. It was eventually combined with another Western starring Keene into a longer film called The Adventures of the Tucson Kid and was syndicated to television as a movie c. 1954.

== Plot ==
Keene plays the "Tucson Kid", an insurance investigator who travels to any town where a suspicious insurance claim has appeared. The career description would allow the proposed series to adopt an anthology format, with a different location and storyline in each episode. The other hero of the story is a sheriff's deputy called Ed (Tom Tyler). Both are middle aged men.

The film is set in a small town by the name of Crossroads. The Tucson Kid, under the alias Duke Smith, is here to investigate the burning of a saloon and the reason the owner demands payment in cash by the insurance company. Said owner is local businessman Bart Miller (Lyle Talbot), who recently arranged the murder of Jim Hawks (the co-owner of the saloon) and the destruction of the saloon in an act of arson. The murdered man was also the local sheriff. Miller employs a criminal gang consisting of Dance (Don Nagle), Lefty (Kenne Duncan), and Max (Bud Osborne).

The gang intends to frame someone for the recent murder and by chance they choose the Tucson Kid. A lynch mob soon gathers, but the prisoner is rescued by "desert rat" Zeke (Harvey B. Dunn). Ed arranges for "Duke Smith" to remain in Zeke's custody. Zeke soon reveals to his guest that Hawks was locked up in the saloon and supposed to die in the fire. He rescued the man from the flames, only to see him murdered shortly afterwards. He suspects Bart Miller was the murderer.

Elsewhere, the gang conspires to murder Zeke and frame "Duke" for the murder. In the resulting gunfight, Zeke is killed and Lefty is wounded. The Tucson Kid buries the man in a makeshift grave. The gang exhumes the body and alerts Ed, who insists that the body should be left to rest in peace. He also insists on a fair trial for "Duke". At this point "Duke" reveals the findings of his recent investigation. The partnership of Hawks and Miller extended to a new drilling rig, and the two had found oil. But Hawks was entitled to a lion's share of the profits, which was the motive of his murder. Realizing that "Duke" and Ed now know the truth, Miller orders his gang to attack. All the villains are killed, including Miller whose death is the result of a friendly fire incident. Ed thanks the Tucson Kid for his help, and the investigator rides out of town. Ending the film.

== Sources ==
- Craig, Rob (2009), "Selected Short Subjects", Ed Wood, Mad Genius: A Critical Study of the Films, McFarland & Company, ISBN 978-0786454235
- Hayes, David C.; Davis, Hayden (2001), "The Complete Filmography", Muddled Mind: The Complete Works of Edward D. Wood, Jr., Lulu, ISBN 978-1605430539
