= The Blue Humans =

American improvisational musical group

The Blue Humans is the name used by experimental guitarist Rudolph Grey for the improvised performances he leads with a variety of other musicians. Grey first came to notice in the late-1970s New York City post punk and art scene which also produced Sonic Youth and Swans, and played in the influential no wave band Mars. Since then, he has released solo material as well as several Blue Humans records, the latter mostly live recordings. Blue Humans members and collaborators have included Tom Surgal, Arthur Doyle, Beaver Harris, Alan Licht, Charles Gayle, and Thurston Moore.

Blue Humans lineups are often trios, sometimes two guitars and drums, sometimes guitar-sax-drums. Their sound is fast-moving, noisy, and aggressively atonal, although on longer pieces such as the 20-minute title track of Clear to Higher Time, they can produce a precisely-controlled build of tension.

== Discography ==
Date	Album	Notes	Label
1993	Clear to Higher Time	Studio recording 1991, produced by Thurston Moore	New Alliance Records
1993	To Higher Time	Live CBGB 1990	New Alliance Records
1995	Incandescence	CBGB opening for Sonic Youth	Shock
1995	Live NY 1980	with Arthur Doyle and Beaver Harris	Audible Hiss
1996	Live in London 1994	-	Blast First
