= A Prayer for Peace =

Live album by Arthur Doyle
- Released: 2000
- Recorded: June 19 and 20, 1999
- Venue: Larry's, Endicott, New York
- Genre: Free jazz
- Label: Zugswang; 0002

A Prayer for Peace is a live album by saxophonist Arthur Doyle. It was recorded in June 1999, and was released in 2000 by the Zugswang label. On the album, Doyle is joined by bassist James Linton and drummer Scott Rodziczak

== Reception ==
Professional ratings
Review scores
Source	Rating
AllMusic	3/5 stars

In a review for AllMusic, Dan Warburton wrote: "The rough-and-ready sound quality of a Doyle album tends to come as something of a shock... the raw direct-to-DAT edge... may be somewhat unsettling at first, but the force of this music quickly overrides superficial aesthetic considerations. Equally unsettling for newcomers to Doyle's universe are his vocals, which can come across as stoned ranting... but are in fact nothing less than the perfect distillation of his improvising practice... A Prayer for Peace makes it absolutely clear that his tenor, flute, and recorder function as natural extensions of his body/voice, all of which helps to explain why Doyle calls his music 'free jazz-soul'."

Derek Taylor, writing for One Final Note, called Doyle's style "a nakedly emotive brand of playing, brutal in both its obstinate honesty and absence of virtuosity in the traditional sense of that usually ill-fitting word." He commented: "Doyle remains an easy target for listeners who base their opinions primarily on the pedantic fulcrum of musical technique. His approaches appear rudimentary on the surface, but there's significant thought and, more importantly, passion behind them. This sort of probity should count for something and, if one suspends the desire to dissect and simply digests the music as its made, rewards do manifest themselves."

== Track listing ==
All compositions by Arthur Doyle.

1. "That Happiness" – 3:38
2. "I Am Somebody" – 6:33
3. "Ahead a Pothead" – 3:14
4. "A Prayer for Peace" – 3:20
5. "Chemistry of Happiness" – 5:51
6. "Homo" – 5:18
7. "Joy of Life" – 8:33
8. "Flue Song" – 5:02
9. "Free Love, Good Love" – 6:09
10. "Flue Song (Tenor Variation)" – 4:50
11. "A Head a Pothead" – 3:50
12. "African Express" – 5:28

== Personnel ==
- Arthur Doyle – tenor saxophone, flute, recorder, voice
- James Linton – double bass, cornet, bells, loops
- Scott Rodziczak – drums, cymbal
