= Duke Moore =

American actor (1913–1976)

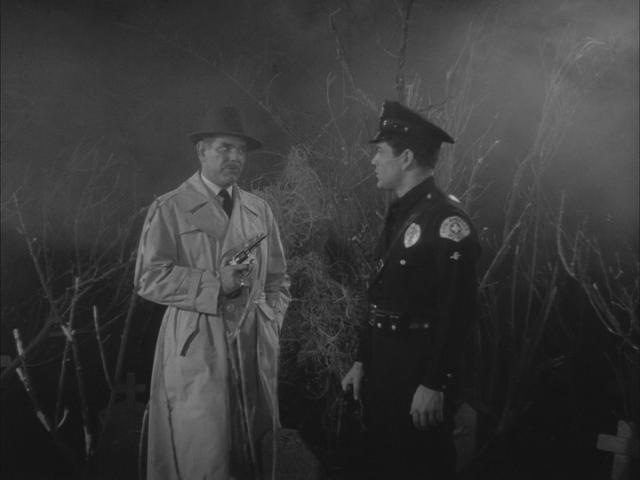
- L-R: Duke Moore and Carl Anthony in Plan 9 from Outer Space
- Born: James Moore; July 15, 1913
- Died: November 16, 1976 (aged 63); Los Angeles, California, U.S.
- Occupation: Film actor

Duke Moore (born James Moore; July 15, 1913 – November 16, 1976) was an American actor who has the distinction of spending his entire on-screen career in productions by Ed Wood.

Between 1953 and 1970, Moore appeared in the following for Wood:

- Crossroads of Laredo
- Final Curtain
- Plan 9 from Outer Space (1957)
- Night of the Ghouls (1959)
- The Sinister Urge (1960)
- Take it Out in Trade (1970)

Moore also received a posthumous addition to his oeuvre when outtake footage to Take it out in Trade was found in a projectionist's booth in a pornographic theater in California and subsequently released on video in "as is" form. This footage can be seen in Take it Out in Trade: The Outtakes.

Duke died from a heart attack in Hollywood, on November 16, 1976, at the age of 63.
