= Crossroads of Laredo =

1995 film

Crossroads of Laredo is a Western film compiled from extant silent footage of the unfinished Streets of Laredo (c. 1948), the first known film project of Ed Wood. It runs 23 minutes in length. Wood was the director, the writer, and one of the actors of the film. The film today includes an added music score by Ben Weisman and added narration by Cliff Stone, but still plays like a silent movie with a sound effects track. The film was not restored, as its myriad scratches and splices are still very evident (it was shot on very inferior quality film stock initially).

The original footage was located by Brett Thompson, John Crawford Thomas, and Wood's ex-girlfriend Dolores Fuller. (John Crawford Thomas had produced the film back in 1948 and saved the extant footage for decades, hoping to some day do something with it.) They were responsible for editing the film and adding a soundtrack to it.

Dolores Fuller wrote an original theme song for the picture and had Elvis Presley Jr. sing it on the film's soundtrack. The film was first shown at a special screening in Hollywood in 1995, along with the premiere of the 1995 documentary The Haunted World of Edward D. Wood, Jr.. The screening was in tribute to Ed Wood and was attended by many of Wood's friends and acquaintances, including Paul Marco, Maila Nurmi (Vampira), Dolores Fuller, John Crawford Thomas, Conrad Brooks, Gregory Walcott, Ann Robinson, the Reverend Lyn Lemon and make-up man Harry Thomas. It was later included on the DVD release of the documentary in 2005, digitally restored.

== Plot ==
The film opens to close-ups of "a gun holding a six-gun in its holster". A young cowboy (played by Ed Wood) is introduced, who according to the narrator sold his herd of cattle at San Antonio for top dollar. He is now seen riding in a crossroads town in the vicinity of Laredo, Texas, looking for an old friend. He is soon ambushed by another cowboy, called Tex (Don Nagel) who first disarms him and then shoots him in cold blood.

Later, Tex heads for the local saloon, and the narrative introduces two other main characters: Lem (Duke Moore) and Barbara (Ruth McCabe). They are old friends who are seen walking together. But Tex wants Barbara, and he soon manages to kiss her. Lem chooses not to interfere, and Tex proceeds to propose marriage. According to the narrator, Tex has had many women and knows just what to say to sweep Barbara off her feet. They are married right away.

A year later, a more weary Barbara is seen. Tex has proved to be a neglectful husband. A scene depicts him rejecting his wife and newborn child. He claims that he only needs his gun and the money it brings him. He spends his money with saloon girls. Lem heads out to see Barbara and informs her of Tex's cheating ways. He also explains his suspicion that Tex kills men for money, then confesses his own love for her. He offers to kill Tex for her.

The two gunfighters meet in a fight at the streets of the small town, and Lem bests his rival. Tex is fatally wounded and soon dies; only four prostitutes are seen mourning for him. The camera then follows his funeral procession to the grave. Barbara leaves Tex's gun and holster on the wooden cross of the grave. Lem chooses the funeral as his moment to surrender to the local sheriff.

The crowd attending the funeral turns into a lynch mob and the sheriff is willing to execute Lem without a trial. Then Barbara approaches the prisoner and gives him a passionate kiss. She informs the crowd that she loves the man. No longer eager to avenge the widow, the crowd releases Lem. The new couple walks out of town together.

== Cast ==
- Ed Wood as Cowboy
- Duke Moore as Lem
- Don Nagel as Tex
- Ruth McCabe as Barbara
- Chuck LaBerge as the Sheriff
- Crawford John Thomas as the Deputy
- Bill Ames as the Bartender
- Dolores Fuller as Woman at the Hanging
- Christopher Longshadow as the Preacher

== Sources ==
- Craig, Rob (2009), "Selected Short Subjects", Ed Wood, Mad Genius: A Critical Study of the Films, McFarland & Company, ISBN 978-0786454235
- Hayes, David C.; Davis, Hayden (2001), "The Complete Filmography", Muddled Mind: The Complete Works of Edward D. Wood, Jr., Lulu, ISBN 978-1605430539
