= Harvey B. Dunn =

American actor

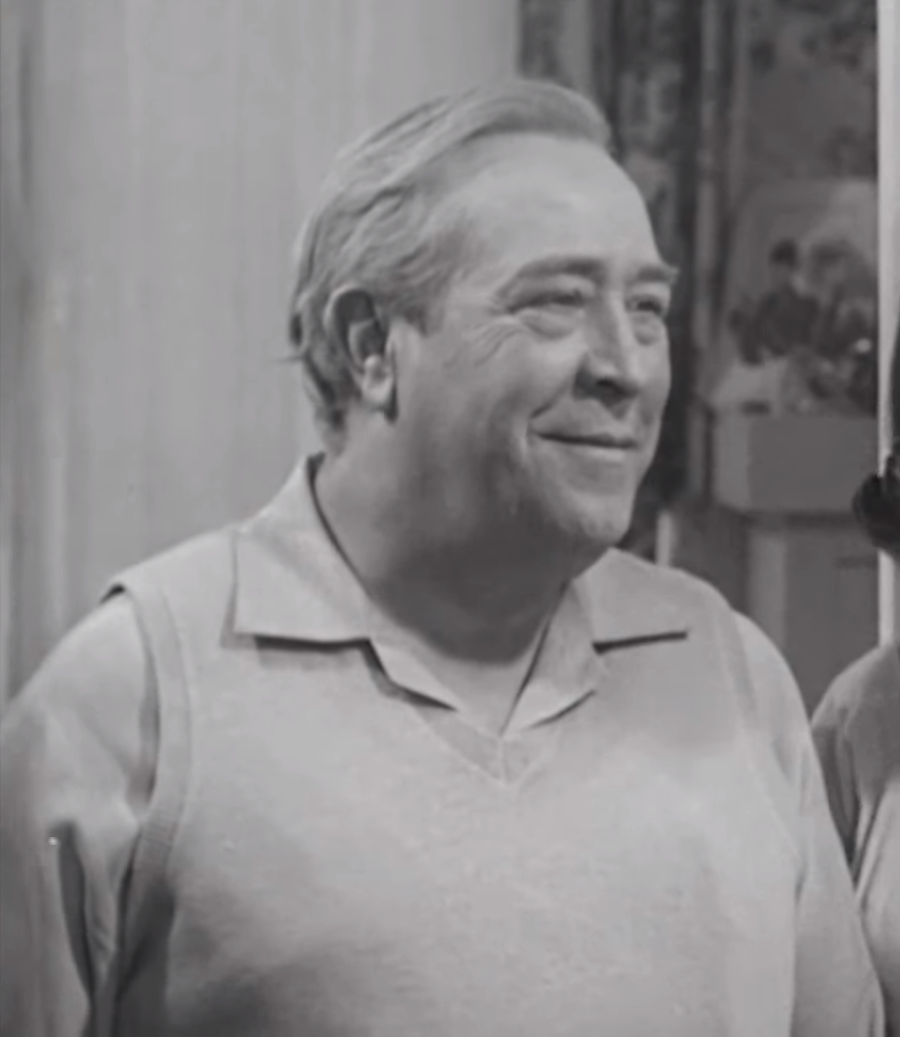
- Harvey B. Dunn as Gramps Morgan in Teenagers from Outer Space (1959)
- Born: August 19, 1894; Yankton, South Dakota, U.S.
- Died: February 21, 1968 (aged 73); Hollywood, Los Angeles, California, U.S.
- Other name: Harvey Dunn
- Occupation: Actor

Harvey B. Dunn (August 19, 1894 – February 21, 1968) was an American television and film actor. Dunn was best known for his appearances in several 1950s B movies including three Ed Wood films, Bride of the Monster (1955), Night of the Ghouls (1959), and The Sinister Urge (1961). He also appeared in Wood's television pilot, Crossroad Avenger: The Adventures of the Tucson Kid. He co-starred in the 1959 cult film Teenagers from Outer Space. Dunn additionally performed in a USO show Three Men or a Horse, singing as part of a male quartet.

== Trademark ==
Dunn is often identified by his missing index finger on his right hand. Called "the man with the missing finger" by such periodicals as The Times Record, Dunn lost his finger at the age of 13. Dunn became so tired of explaining how he lost his finger, initially he would lie and say it was run over by a steamer or it had been nipped off by a woodpecker. Finally, he had a printed card that explained its loss:

The story of my finger cut off July 18, 1908: "Caught in a cogwheel of a printing press at the Press and Dakotan office, Yankton, S. D., while working around the press. Attending physician Dr. Moorehouse. I did not sue for damages. I can write just as well now, if not better, than before the accident. The stub of the finger has the tendency to melt in summer and freeze in winter. I swear this is a true statement to the best of my knowledge." Sincerely yours, Harvey B. Dunn.

== Filmography ==
Year	Title	Role	Notes
1948	Superman	Railroad Track Worker	Uncredited (chapters 1 & 2)
1951	Vengeance Valley	Poker Dealer	Uncredited
1951	Racket Squad	1st Man - Ed	Episode: "The Case of the Miracle Mud"
1951	Bannerline	Grand Jury Clerk	Uncredited
1951	Reunion in Reno	Court Clerk	Uncredited
1952	Fireside Theater		Episode: "Another Harvest"
1953	Crossroad Avenger: The Adventures of the Tucson Kid	Zeke	Television movie
1953	The Cisco Kid	Cookie	Episode: "Smuggled Silver"
1954	I Led Three Lives	Photography clerk	Episode: "Asylum"
1954	Dragon's Gold	Board Member	Uncredited
1954	Sabrina	Party Guest with Tray	Uncredited
1955	The Whistler		Episode: "The First Year"
1955	Bride of the Monster	Captain Tom Robbins	Alternative title: Bride of the Atom
1955	One Desire	Lamplighter	Uncredited
1955	Tales of the Texas Rangers	Bert Haskins	Episode: "Carnival Criss-Cross"
1955	Producers' Showcase		Episode: "Out Town"
1955	It's a Dog's Life	Pawnbroker	Uncredited
1956	Giant	After dinner speaker	
1956	Medic	Harvy	Episode: "Just Like Your Father"
1956	Ransom!	Elderly Man	Uncredited
1956	I Killed Wild Bill Hickok	Dr. Reed	
1956	Highway Patrol	Charlie Webster	Episode: "Prospector"
1956	The Fastest Gun Alive	Teller	Uncredited
1956 to 1958	Sky King	Appleby; Bailey	2 episodes
1957	Last of the Badmen	Gallatin telegraph operator	Uncredited
1957	The Kettles on Old MacDonald's Farm	Judge	
1958	Desire Under the Elms	Farmer	Uncredited
1958	Bat Masterson	Mayor	Episode: "General Sherman's March Through Dodge City"
1959	Night of the Ghouls	Henry	Alternative title: Revenge of the Dead
1959	The Remarkable Mr. Pennypacker	The Verger	Uncredited
1959	Teenagers from Outer Space	Gramps Morgan	Alternative title: The Gargon Terror
1960	The Deputy	Sleepy Man	Episode: "Passage to New Orleans"
1960	The Untouchables	Apartment Superintendent	Episode: "The Purple Gang"
1960	The Sinister Urge	Mr. Romaine	
1961	Ada	Politician	Uncredited
1964	My Fair Lady	Ascot extra	Uncredited
1965	The Long, Hot Summer	Barlett	Episode: "Home Is a Nameless Place"
1965	Bob Hope Presents the Chrysler Theatre		Episode: "The Admiral"
