= Hollywood Rat Race =

Autobiographical book by Ed Wood Jr.

- Author: Ed Wood Jr.
- Language: English
- Genre: Memoir, autobiography
- Publisher: Four Walls Eight Windows
- Publication date: 1998
- Publication place: United States
- Media type: Print
- Pages: 138

Hollywood Rat Race is an autobiographical book by Ed Wood Jr., written in 1965 and published posthumously in 1998.

== Overview ==
The chronicles of filmmaker Ed Wood Jr. on how to make it in Hollywood. Wood advises new writers to "just keep on writing. Even if your story gets worse, you'll get better", and also recounts tales of dubious authenticity, such as how he and Bela Lugosi entered the world of nightclub cabaret.
