= Meatcleaver Massacre =

- Theatrical release poster
- Directed by: Keith Burns; Ed Wood (onscreen credit to Evan Lee)
- Screenplay by: Keith Burns; Ray Atherton
- Produced by: Ray Atherton
- Starring: Christopher Lee; Larry Justin; J. Arthur Craig
- Cinematography: Guerdon Trueblood
- Edited by: Miklos Gyulai; Jim Bryan (re-cut)
- Production company: Cine Repertory Group
- Distributed by: Group 1 International Distribution
- Release date: November 2, 1977
- Running time: 85 minutes (Note: The cut of the film titled Hollywood Meatcleaver Massacre, which does not feature the Christopher Lee prologue or epilogue, runs 77 minutes.)
- Country: United States
- Language: English

Meatcleaver Massacre is a 1977 American slasher film directed by Keith Burns and Ed Wood, credited to the pseudonymous Evan Lee. It follows a college professor who, after several of his disgruntled students murder his family and leave him permanently disabled, invokes a Gaelic demon to enact revenge.

The film was originally released as Hollywood Meatcleaver Massacre in 1977. It was re-released under the shorter Meatcleaver Massacre title in an alternate version that features a bookending prologue and epilogue narrated by Christopher Lee. The footage featuring Lee was actually shot for a different project that never came to fruition, and was purchased by the producers of Hollywood Meatcleaver Massacre, who grafted it onto the film and re-released it.

== Plot ==
In Los Angeles, Professor Cantrell, a prolific expert in the occult, gives a lecture on a Gaelic demon named Morak at the university where he is employed. Afterward, a malcontent student, Mason Harrue, and his friends Sean Allen, Dirk Kramer, and Phil Jones, get drunk and go driving through the city. They decide to visit Professor Cantrell's home and play a prank on him. However, the prank goes awry when Mason bludgeons the Professor and orders the others to murder his wife and children, which they agree to, stabbing them each to death. Professor Cantrell survives the attack, but is left paraplegic and in a coma. Detective Wexler investigates the crime, and his only lead is a small piece of cloth triangle that was discovered at the scene. In his unconscious state, Cantrell invokes the demon Morak to avenge him.

Later, a guilt-addled Sean has a hallucinatory nightmare in which he is chased by an unseen force through a mausoleum and on an empty beach. He awakens and his girlfriend Darlene confronts him about his change in behavior. Sean goes on a walk in the desert to clear his head, but is haunted by disembodied voices and sees a vision of Cantrell's blood, deceased daughter. He is then attacked by the invisible demonic force, which disembowels him. When Sean fails to return, Dirk and Phil confide to Mason that they are frightened that they will be arrested. A defiant Mason assures them that Cantrell will never be able to speak again.

Dirk contemplates committing suicide by cutting his wrists, but stops short of doing so. Instead, Dirk reports to his night shift as a mechanic in Topanga Canyon. While working on a car in the garage, Dirk hears strange noises before the demon slams the car hood on him repeatedly, crushing him to death. Detective Wexler connects the cloth triangle from the Cantrell crime scene to Dirk's jacket. He subsequently begins to investigate the potential occult elements of the case.

Phil visits a massage parlor in Hollywood, where he has sex with a classmate, Patty. That night, while working alone as a projectionist at a movie theater, Phil has disturbing visions of the Cantrell murders before he is killed by an exploding film projector. Wexler becomes convinced that Cantrell has somehow orchestrated the deaths of the three young students through supernatural means. Wexler attempts to confront Mason when he returns to the crime scene at the Cantrell home, believing that Mason may be able to save himself if he can find a counter-incantation that will nullify that which Cantrell used to invoke Morak. A disgruntled Mason instead murders Wexler, before being attacked by Morak.

Later, Mason, now in a psychiatric institution, is mocked by those around him for his claim that he was assaulted by a demon.

== Cast ==
- Christopher Lee as On-Screen Narrator
- Larry Justin as Mason Harrue
- J. Arthur Craig as Detective Wexler
- James Habif as Professor Cantrell
- Robert Clark as Sean Allen
- Doug Senior as Dirk Kramer
- Bob Mead as Phil Jones
- Alisa Beaton as Darlene

== Production ==
Cinematographer Roy H. Wagner, in a Facebook post on August 10, 2022, wrote, "In 1974 I photographed a movie in four days with my Mitchell BNCR and ARRI IIC called Meatcleaver Massacre. It’s terrible. Thank god they never paid me ($500 including my equipment) for they took my name off the credits. The original director was [co-screenwriter] Keith Burns who was replaced by Ed Wood. Jim Bagdonas ASC, first day in the business was as my assistant on this film. The producer was film collector, Ray Atherton." In the Andrew Rausch book Trash Cinema: A Celebration of Overlooked Masterpieces, Wagner and secondary film editor James Bryan corroborate Wood's role as replacement director. Wagner stated its original title was Morak's Chant, followed by Cantrell's Messiah, before Meatcleaver Massacre was applied to it.

Wagner later revealed more information on Ed Wood's involvement, "He had been on the set because he was someone's friend and was there with a still camera doing some stuff, but he ended up principally directing the movie. Ed was very ebullient. He believed he was making a great movie and he convinced all of us that we were making a great movie, but really it was just a piece of junk. It was the last film he made." Reflecting further, Wagner said, "All I knew of Ed was that he was a sweet guy who really loved movies - that is the key thing I remember about him. You could mention any movie and he knew everything about it... As a director, Ed didn't tell me to do anything; he was just there, almost like a cheerleader. He kind of allowed you to do whatever you wanted to do." (Although Ed Wood was said to be on the set during production, whether or not he "co-directed" the film is unverified. His name does not appear in the credits.)

== Release ==
The film premiered as Hollywood Meatcleaver Massacre in Casa Grande, Arizona on November 2, 1976. It was re-released in 1977 under the shorter Meatcleaver Massacre title, featuring a bookending prologue and epilogue narrated by Christopher Lee. The footage featuring Lee was actually shot for a different project that never came to fruition, and was purchased by the producers of Hollywood Meatcleaver Massacre, who grafted it onto the film and re-released it.

== Legacy ==
In 2022, American home video label Shout! Factory released a restoration of Meatcleaver Massacre on Blu-ray. The release, which was limited to 1,500 units, included two cuts of the movie – an 85-minute cut featuring the intro/outro with Christopher Lee and a 77-minute cut without Lee – as well as the original theatrical trailer.

In 2023, UK home video label 101 Films released a limited edition Blu-ray of Meatcleaver Massacre as part of their Black Label series. In addition to including both cuts of the movie and the original theatrical trailer, the 101 Films release featured new video interviews with director/writer Keith Burns, actor Doug Senior, and actor Paul Kelleher. It also included two limited edition booklets: Axploitation in Blazing Color by Dylan Dean Staley and the original lost script Professor Cantrell’s Messiah by Keith Burns and Ray Atherton. The release was well-received, particularly the restoration and extras, with one reviewer writing of the film itself, "a seedy '70s exploitation stew that I find quite tasty."

== Sources ==
- Stine, Scott Aaron (2015). The Gorehound's Guide to Splatter Films of the 1960s and 1970s. Jefferson, North Carolina: McFarland. ISBN 978-0-786-49140-7.
