= Live at Glenn Miller Café (Arthur Doyle and Sunny Murray album) =

Live album by Arthur Doyle and Sunny Murray
- Released: 2001
- Recorded: March 28, 2000
- Venue: Glenn Miller Café, Stockholm, Sweden
- Genre: Free jazz
- Length: 1:06:43
- Label: Ayler Records aylCD-002

Live at Glenn Miller Café is a live album by saxophonist Arthur Doyle and drummer Sunny Murray. It was recorded in March 2000 at the Glenn Miller Café in Stockholm, Sweden, and was released in 2001 by Ayler Records. Although the album is credited to Doyle and Murray, the first three tracks are a duet between Murray and saxophonist Bengt Frippe Nordström, who died several months after the concert.

== Reception ==
Professional ratings
Review scores
Source	Rating
AllMusic	3/5 stars
The Penguin Guide to Jazz	3/4 stars
All About Jazz	3/5 stars

In a review for AllMusic, Steve Loewy wrote: "this is one of [Doyle's] better-recorded displays, with some intense work on both tenor and flute. Veteran Sunny Murray... is... highly effective, keeping the saxophonist on target.... This is an important album for a rare glimpse of Nordström, and for an unusually coherent Doyle. While it may not convert Doyle's detractors, it should satisfy his admirers. The sound quality is remarkably good considering this was a live date."

The authors of the Penguin Guide to Jazz Recordings referred to Murray as Doyle's "motor," and stated that "Two Free Jazz Men Speak" "apotheosizes their duet manner."

Derek Taylor of All About Jazz called the album "visceral energy music designed to strike the ears with maximum emphatic impact," and commented: "this Glenn Miller set is... proof that true improvisatory music never unfolds the same way twice. Whether you love Doyle or despise him there’s no denying the stamina and resolve he puts into his performances."

Writing for Paris Transatlantic, Dan Warburton stated: "The recording wisely mixes Murray's drums behind Doyle's horns... and the interplay between the musicians is evident throughout... Murray's... playing on this album ought to serve as an inspiration for generations to come. Doyle's reading of 'Nature Boy'... is awesome... both of these special musicians are still, to quote John Zorn, kicking butt."

== Track listing ==
1. "Spontaneous Creation, Part 1" (Nordström) – 2:00
2. "Spontaneous Creation, Part 2" (Nordström) – 6:36
3. "Spontaneous Creation, Part 3" (Nordström) – 3:19
4. "African Love Call" (Doyle) – 12:33
5. "Two Free Jazz Men Speak" (Doyle/Murray) – 20:16
6. "Nature Boy" (eden ahbez) – 9:27
7. "Joy" (Doyle/Murray) – 12:33

== Personnel ==
- Arthur Doyle – tenor saxophone, flugelhorn, voice (tracks 4–7)
- Bengt Frippe Nordström – alto saxophone (tracks 1–3)
- Sunny Murray – drums
