= The Songwriter =

Studio album by Arthur Doyle
- Released: 1995
- Recorded: November 8 and 9, 1994
- Genre: Free jazz
- Label: Ecstatic Peace! E# 48

The Songwriter is a solo album by saxophonist Arthur Doyle. It was recorded in November 1994 and released in 1995 by Ecstatic Peace! The album features music from the "Arthur Doyle Songbook," written during his five-year imprisonment in France. It was recorded using a portable cassette machine.

== Reception ==
Professional ratings
Review scores
Source	Rating
AllMusic	4/5 stars

In a review for AllMusic, Dan Warburton wrote: "These extraordinary solo recordings, made in Doyle's apartment and recorded in glorious lo-fi on a cassette recorder (complete with stop-start clunks) have more in common with field recordings of ethnic music, be it folk from the backwoods of the United States or pygmy music from the heart of Africa... there is little in the recorded canon of American folk and jazz, with the possible exception of Harry Partch's early hobo songs or certain tracks on Harry Smith's Anthology of American Folk Music, to prepare the listener for the raw and uninhibited expression of The Songwriter... An indispensable album from one of the last true originals."

Clifford Allen, writing for Tiny Mix Tapes, stated that, on the album, "there are views of an artistic figure whose specificity plays to the universal, and that's part of what makes Doyle's solo work so unique." He commented: "It isn't polished or pretty, and its delicate, personal expression can be a lot to bear — even for someone weaned on the avant-garde. Doyle's songs occupy a special place outside any pantheon, yet their realness is shocking and captivating."

In an article for Red Bull Music Academy, Jon Dale commented that "the crudeness, the rudeness" of the recordings posit them "as exalted and exultant documents of deeply personal expression."

A writer for Aquarium Drunkard called the album "some of the loneliest and most urgent music ever released."

== Track listing ==
All compositions by Arthur Doyle.

1. "Ancestor" – 9:53
2. "African Express" – 7:17
3. "Noah Black Ark" – 8:25
4. "Are You Sleeping" – 7:47
5. "Prophet John C" – 4:44
6. "Chemistry Of Happiness" – 6:15

== Personnel ==
- Arthur Doyle – tenor saxophone, flute, voice
