= Ed Wood =

American filmmaker, actor and author (1924–1978)

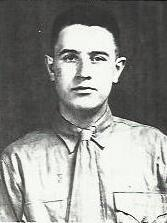
- Undated portrait of Wood from the United States Armed Forces
- Born: Edward Davis Wood Jr. October 10, 1924; Poughkeepsie, New York, U.S.
- Died: December 10, 1978 (aged 54); Los Angeles, California, U.S.
- Other names: Shirley; Daniel Davis; Ann Gora; Edward D. Wood Jr. Akdov Telmig; Larry Lee; Don Miller
- Occupations: Filmmaker; author; actor
- Years active: 1947–1978
- Spouses: Norma McCarty (m. 1956; sep. 1956) Kathy O'Hara (m. 1956)
- Children: 1 (disputed)
- Military career
- Branch: United States Marine Corps
- Service years: 1942–1946
- Conflicts: World War II: Gilbert and Marshall Islands campaign

Edward Davis Wood Jr. (October 10, 1924 – December 10, 1978) was an American filmmaker, actor and novelist. In the 1950s, Wood directed several low-budget science fiction, crime and horror films that later became cult classics, notably Glen or Glenda (1953), Jail Bait (1954), Bride of the Monster (1955), Plan 9 from Outer Space (1957) and Night of the Ghouls (1959). (Note: Night of the Ghouls was finished in 1959, but was shelved until 1984.) In the 1960s and 1970s, he moved towards sexploitation and pornographic films such as The Sinister Urge (1960), Orgy of the Dead (1965) and Necromania (1971), and wrote over 80 lurid pulp crime and sex novels.

Marked by their campy aesthetics, technical errors, unsophisticated special effects, integration of poorly-matched stock footage, eccentric casts, idiosyncratic stories and non sequitur dialogue, Wood's films remained largely obscure until he was posthumously awarded a Golden Turkey Award for Worst Director of All Time in 1980, renewing public interest in his life and work. Some film critics, like Will Sloan, have argued against the Worst Director label, making the case that Wood was creative in working with the financial and cinematic limitations he faced.

A biography, Nightmare of Ecstasy: The Life and Art of Edward D. Wood Jr. by Rudolph Grey, was released in 1992. It was adapted into the film Ed Wood (1994), directed by Tim Burton. Starring Johnny Depp as Wood and Martin Landau as his frequent collaborator Bela Lugosi, the film received critical acclaim.

== Early years ==
Wood's father worked for the United States Post Office as a custodian, and his family relocated numerous times around the United States. Eventually, they settled in Poughkeepsie, New York, where Wood was born in 1924. According to his second wife, Kathy O'Hara, Wood's mother Lillian would dress him in girl's clothing when he was a child because she had always wanted a daughter (Wood had one brother, several years younger than himself). For the rest of his life, Wood crossdressed, infatuated with the feel of angora on his skin.

During his childhood, Wood was interested in the performing arts and pulp fiction. He collected comic books and pulp magazines, and adored movies, especially Westerns, serials, and the occult. Buck Jones and Bela Lugosi were two of his earliest childhood idols. He often skipped school in order to watch motion pictures at the local movie theater, where stills and lobby cards from last week's films would often be thrown into the trash by theater staff, allowing Wood to salvage the images, and to add to his extensive collection.

On his 12th birthday, in 1936, Wood received as a gift his first movie camera, a Kodak "Cine Special". One of his first pieces of footage showed the airship Hindenburg passing over the Hudson River at Poughkeepsie, which he filmed hours before its disastrous crash at Lakehurst, New Jersey. One of Wood's first paid jobs was as a cinema usher, and he also sang and played drums in a band. Subsequently, he formed a quartet called "Eddie Wood's Little Splinters" in which he sang and played multiple stringed instruments.

=== Military service ===
In 1942, Wood enlisted at age 17 in the United States Marine Corps, just months after the attack on Pearl Harbor. Assigned to the 2nd Defense Battalion, he reached the rank of corporal before he was discharged in 1946 at age 21. Although Wood reportedly claimed to have faced strenuous combat (including having his front teeth knocked out by a Japanese soldier whom he then stabbed to death in a rage), his actual military adventures included recovering bodies on Betio following the Battle of Tarawa and experiencing minor Japanese bombing raids on Betio and the Ellice Islands. A recurring filariasis infection left him performing clerical work for the remainder of his enlistment. His wartime dental extractions were carried out over several months by Navy dentists, unconnected to any combat. Wood had false teeth that he would slip out from his mouth when he wanted to make his wife Kathy laugh, showing her a big toothless grin. Wood later claimed that he feared being wounded in battle more than he feared being killed, mainly because he was afraid a combat medic would discover him wearing a pink bra and panties under his uniform during the Battle of Tarawa.

== Career ==
=== Directing and screenwriting ===
In 1947, Wood moved to Hollywood, California, where he wrote scripts and directed television pilots, commercials and several forgotten micro-budget westerns, most of which failed to sell. Wood biographer Rudolph Grey states that Ed Wood made approximately 125 commercials for Story-Ad films and approximately 30 commercials for Play-Ad Films, in addition to a few commercials for "Pie-Quick".

In 1948, Wood wrote, produced, directed, and starred in The Casual Company, a play derived from his own unpublished novel which was based on his service in the United States Marine Corps. It opened at the Village Playhouse to negative reviews on October 25. That same year, he wrote and directed a low-budget western called Crossroads of Laredo with the aid of a young producer he met named Crawford John Thomas. The film was shot silent and was only completed posthumously decades after Wood's death.

In 1949, Wood and Thomas acted together in a play called The Blackguard Returns at the Gateway Theatre (Wood played the Sheriff and Thomas was the villain). Wood joined the Screen Actors Guild in 1951, and worked very briefly as a stuntman among other things. When writing, Wood used a number of different pen names, including Ann Gora (in reference to Angora, his favorite textile) and Akdov Telmig (the backwards spelling of his favorite drink, the vodka gimlet).

In 1952, the 28-year-old Wood was introduced to actor Bela Lugosi by friend and fellow writer-producer Alex Gordon (Wood's roommate at the time who was later involved in creating American International Pictures). Lugosi's son, Bela George Lugosi Jr., has been among those who felt Wood exploited the senior Lugosi's stardom, taking advantage of the fading actor when he could not afford to refuse any work. However, most documents and interviews with other Wood associates in Nightmare of Ecstasy suggest that Wood and Lugosi were genuine friends and that Wood helped Lugosi through the worst days of his clinical depression and drug addiction. Lugosi had become dependent on morphine as a way of controlling his debilitating sciatica over the years, and was in a poor mental state caused by his recent fourth divorce.

==== Glen or Glenda ====
In 1953, Wood wrote and directed the semi-documentary film Glen or Glenda (originally titled I Changed My Sex!) with producer George Weiss. The film starred Wood (under the alias "Daniel Davis") as a transvestite, his girlfriend Dolores Fuller, Timothy Farrell, Lyle Talbot, Conrad Brooks and Bela Lugosi as the narrator/scientist. Fuller was shocked when she learned soon afterward that Wood actually was a cross-dresser.

In 1953, Wood wrote and directed a stage show for Lugosi called The Bela Lugosi Review (a take-off on Dracula) that was put on at the Silver Slipper in Las Vegas. When Lugosi appeared on the TV show You Asked For It that same year, he announced that Ed Wood was producing a Dr. Acula TV show for him, but it never materialized. Wood acted as Lugosi's dialogue coach when he guest-starred on The Red Skelton Show in 1954, alongside Lon Chaney Jr. and Vampira (aka Maila Nurmi).

==== Jail Bait ====
Wood co-produced and directed a crime film, Jail Bait (1954, originally titled The Hidden Face), along with his co-writer/roommate Alex Gordon, which starred Herbert Rawlinson (as the plastic surgeon), Lyle Talbot, Dolores Fuller, Timothy Farrell, Theodora Thurman and Steve Reeves (in one of his first acting jobs). Bela Lugosi was supposed to play the lead role of the plastic surgeon, but was busy with another project when filming started and had to bow out. His replacement, Herbert Rawlinson, died the day after he filmed his scenes. Distributor Ron Ormond changed the title from The Hidden Face to Jail Bait just before releasing it.

==== Bride of the Monster ====
Wood produced and directed the horror film Bride of the Monster (1955, originally titled Bride of the Atom or The Monster of the Marshes), based on an original story idea by Alex Gordon which he had originally called The Atomic Monster. It starred Bela Lugosi as the mad scientist, Swedish wrestler Tor Johnson as mute manservant "Lobo", Paul Marco, Billy Benedict ("Whitey" of The Bowery Boys), Harvey B. Dunn and Loretta King. Soon after the film was completed, Bela Lugosi committed himself to the Norwalk State Hospital for three months, to be treated for drug addiction. The film premiered on May 11, 1955, at the Paramount theater in Hollywood while Lugosi was institutionalized, but a special screening was arranged for him upon his release, pleasing him greatly.

==== The Violent Years ====
In 1956, Wood wrote the screenplay (uncredited) for the film The Violent Years (originally titled Teenage Girl Gang), which was directed by William M. Morgan, starring Playboy model Jean Moorhead, Timothy Farrell, and serial star I. Stanford Jolley (as a judge).

Wood began filming a juvenile delinquency film called Rock and Roll Hell (a.k.a. Hellborn) in 1956, but producer George Weiss pulled the plug on the project after only ten minutes of footage had been completed. Wood's friend Conrad Brooks purchased the footage from Weiss, and some scenes were later incorporated as stock footage into Wood's later Night of the Ghouls (1959). (The entire ten minutes of footage was later released complete on VHS in 1993, as Hellborn.)

==== Plan 9 from Outer Space ====
Plan 9 from Outer Space, full film; runtime 01:19:03

In late 1956, Wood co-produced, wrote, and directed his science fiction opus Plan 9 from Outer Space (his screenplay was originally titled Grave Robbers from Outer Space), which featured Bela Lugosi in a small role. (Although Lugosi died in August 1956 before production began, Wood used footage he had shot of Lugosi in 1955–1956.) The film also starred Tor Johnson, Vampira (Maila Nurmi), Tom Mason (who doubled for Lugosi in some scenes), and the Amazing Criswell as the film's narrator. Plan 9 premiered on March 15, 1957, at the Carlton Theatre in Hollywood, and later went into general release in July 1958 (retitled Plan Nine from Outer Space) in Texas and a number of other Southern states. It was finally sold to late night television in 1961, thereby finding its audience over the years. It became Wood's best-known film and found a cult following in 1980 when Michael Medved declared this film "the worst film ever made" in his book The Golden Turkey Awards.

==== Final Curtain ====
In 1957, Wood wrote and directed a pilot for a suspense-horror TV series called Portraits in Terror that ultimately failed to sell. The pilot, entitled Final Curtain, sees an old and world-weary actor wandering in an empty theatre, imagining ghosts and a living mannequin haunting the backstage area, until he realizes that he himself is dead. The episode has no dialogue, and Dudley Manlove narrates the thoughts of Duke Moore as the actor. Lugosi would have starred in this short film had he lived. Parts of the unsold pilot were later recycled for use in Wood's Night of the Ghouls (1959). The episode was thought to be lost until a complete print was located c. 2010. It was remastered and given its first ever cinema showing in a theater in February 2012. Today it is widely available online and on DVD.

==== Night of the Ghouls ====
In 1958, Wood wrote, produced, and directed Night of the Ghouls (originally titled Revenge of the Dead), starring Kenne Duncan, Tor Johnson (reprising his role as "Lobo" from Bride of the Monster), Criswell, Duke Moore, and Valda Hansen. The film premiered at the Vista Theatre in Hollywood on a double bill with the Lana Turner movie Imitation of Life on March 17, 1959, and then promptly vanished from circulation. For many years, it was thought to be a lost film, but distribution of the film was held up for 25 years because Wood had not paid the lab bill. Video producer Wade Williams paid the bill and released the film on videocassette in 1984, copyrighting the film in his own name.

In 1958, Wood also wrote the screenplay for The Bride and the Beast (1958), which was directed by Adrian Weiss. Wood's screenplay was based on Weiss' plot.

Wood also wrote the screenplay (as "Peter LaRoche") for a 1959 "nudie cutie" film called Revenge of the Virgins, which was directed by Peter Perry Jr.

==== The Sinister Urge ====
Wood wrote and directed the exploitation film The Sinister Urge (1960), starring Kenne Duncan, Duke Moore, Dino Fantini, Harvey B. Dunn and Carl Anthony. Filmed in just five days, this is the last mainstream film Wood directed. The film contains an "eerily prescient" scene, in which Carl Anthony's character states, "I look at this slush, and I try to remember, at one time, I made good movies". The scenes of the teenagers at the pizzeria had been previously shot in 1956 for Wood's unfinished juvenile delinquency film, Rock and Roll Hell (a.k.a. Hellborn).

Also in 1960, Wood wrote the screenplay for The Peeper, which he intended as a direct sequel to his 1960 film The Sinister Urge, but it was never produced.

Wood also contributed to the plot of Jane Mann's 1961 screenplay Anatomy of a Psycho. The film was directed by Mann's husband Boris Petroff.

In 1963, Wood wrote the screenplay for Shotgun Wedding (an exploitation film directed by Boris Petroff about hillbillies marrying child brides in the Ozarks). Wood wrote the screenplay from a story idea by Jane Mann. Wood's friend, cameraman William C. Thompson, died around this time.

==== Orgy of the Dead ====
Wood's 1965 transitional film Orgy of the Dead (originally titled Nudie Ghoulies) combined the horror and sexploitation genres. Wood handled various production details while Stephen C. Apostolof directed under the pseudonym A. C. Stephen. The film begins with a recreation of the opening scene from Night of the Ghouls. Criswell, wearing one of Lugosi's old capes, rises from his coffin to deliver an introduction taken almost word-for-word from the previous film. Set in a misty graveyard, the Lord of the Dead (Criswell) and his sexy consort, the Black Ghoul (a Vampira look-alike), preside over a series of macabre performances by topless dancers from beyond the grave (recruited by Wood from local strip clubs). Together, Wood and Apostolof went on to make a string of sexploitation films up to 1977. Wood co-wrote the screenplays with Apostolof and occasionally even acted in some of the films.

In 1969, Wood appeared in The Photographer (a.k.a. Love Feast or Pretty Models All in a Row), the first of two films produced by a Marine buddy, Joseph F. Robertson, with Wood portraying a photographer using his position to engage in sexual antics with his models.

Wood had a smaller role in Robertson's second film, Mrs. Stone's Thing (1970), as a transvestite who spends his time at a party trying on lingerie in a bedroom.

In 1969, Wood adapted his own novel Mama's Diary written under the pseudonym Dick Trent into Operation Red Light for Jacques Descent Production. Over half the footage was destroyed in a film-processing accident and the film is considered lost.

Venus Flytrap (1970) aka The Revenge of Dr. X, a US/Japanese co-production, was based on an unproduced Ed Wood screenplay from the 1950s. The film was produced and directed by Sci-Fi pulp writer Norman Earl Thomson. The film involves a mad scientist who uses lightning to transform plants into man-eating monsters. Wood did not participate in the actual making of the movie.

==== Take It Out in Trade ====
In 1970, Wood wrote and directed his own pornographic film, Take It Out in Trade, starring Duke Moore and Nona Carver. Wood played a transvestite named Alecia in the film.

In 1970, Wood produced a 45 rpm record which featured Tor Johnson on one side reading The Day The Mummy Returned, and Criswell reading The Final Curtain on the other. It has never been determined whether or not the record was actually released, but many of them were definitely produced.

==== Necromania ====
In 1971, Wood produced, wrote and directed Necromania (subtitled A Tale of Weird Love) under the pseudonym "Don Miller". The film was an early entry to the new subgenre of hardcore pornographic films. Thought lost for years, it resurfaced in edited form on Mike Vraney's Something Weird imprint in the late 1980s and was re-released later on DVD by Fleshbot Films in 2005. In the Rudolph Grey biography Nightmare of Ecstasy, Maila Nurmi ("Vampira") said she declined Wood's offer to do a nude scene sitting in a coffin for Necromania, claiming she was recovering from a stroke at the time.

From 1971 to 1972, Wood directed an unknown number of short X-rated films produced by the Swedish Erotica film company. These were short 12-minute loops that were silent films with subtitles. Wood was paid $100 for every ten loops he subtitled.

Wood's friends Kenne Duncan and Tor Johnson both died during this period. Wood was named executor of Kenne Duncan's estate, and following Duncan's death, Wood held a small memorial funeral for him with his wife and some friends in his backyard around the swimming pool where they eulogized the departed Western film star. Wood's friend Duke Moore died in 1976.

Throughout the 1970s, Wood worked with his friend Stephen C. Apostolof, usually co-writing scripts with him, but also serving as an assistant director and an associate producer. (Together they had made Wood's Orgy of the Dead back in 1965.) Wood's last known on-screen appearance (a dual role) was in Apostolof's 1974 film Fugitive Girls (a.k.a. Five Loose Women), in which he played both a gas station attendant called "Pops" and a sheriff on the fugitive women's trail. In 1974, Wood was allegedly on the set of an ultra-low budget film called Meatcleaver Massacre (1977) and is said to have co-directed at least one scene in the film (uncredited), but his involvement is dubious.

At the time of his death, Wood was working on a biographical screenplay based on the last years of actor Bela Lugosi to be called Lugosi Post Mortem, which was supposed to star actor Peter Coe as Lugosi, and Karl Johnson as his own father, Tor Johnson. The nearly completed script was left behind the last time Wood was evicted and is presumed to have been discarded in the trash. Wood was also working on a screenplay for a film called Venus De Milo, a mystery that would explain the famous statue's missing arms.

Technically, Wood's last acting job was in the 1978 Stephen Apostolof film Hot Ice. Ed Wood played a janitor in the film, but his scene was cut out at the last minute due to his drunkenness on the set. Wood died soon after this film was made in 1978, at age 54. Apostolof himself stopped making films as well at this time.

=== Books and novels ===
Beginning in 1963 up until his death, Wood wrote at least 80 lurid crime and sex novels in addition to hundreds of short stories and non-fiction pieces for magazines and daily newspapers.

His novels include Black Lace Drag (1963) (reissued in 1965 as Killer in Drag), Orgy of the Dead (1965), Parisian Passions (1966), Watts the Difference (1966), Side-Show Siren (1966), Drag Trade (1967), Watts After (1967), Devil Girls (1967), It Takes One to Know One (1967), Death of a Transvestite (1967), Suburbia Confidential (1967), Night Time Lez (1968), The Perverts (1968), Bye Bye Broadie (1968), Raped in the Grass (1968), Sex, Shrouds and Caskets (1968), Love of the Dead (1968), The Sexecutives (1968), Young, Black and Gay (1968), Hell Chicks (1968), The Gay Underworld (1968), Carnival Piece (1969), Toni, Black Tigress (1969), Mama's Diary (1969), To Make a Homo (1969), Mary-Go-Round (1969), The Sexual Woman (1971), The Only House (1972), A Study of Fetishes and Fantasies (1973), Tales for a Sexy Night Part 1 and 2 (1973), Sex Star (1973), Death of a Transvestite Hooker (1974). Forced Entry (1974), and TV Lust (1977).

In 1965, Wood wrote the quasi-memoir Hollywood Rat Race, which was only published years later in 1998. In it, Wood advises new writers to "just keep on writing. Even if your story gets worse, you'll get better", and also recounts tales of dubious authenticity, such as how he and Bela Lugosi entered the world of nightclub cabaret.

Thirty-two short stories known to be written by Wood (he sometimes wrote under pseudonyms such as "Ann Gora" and "Dr. T.K. Peters") are collected in an anthology Blood Splatters Quickly, published by OR Books in 2014.

=== Unrealized projects ===
- Dr. Acula – Wood was supposed to write and direct this proposed 1953 TV series in which Bela Lugosi was supposed to play a mysterious investigator of the supernatural, to be produced by Ted Allan, but it was never made. (Lugosi mentioned it when he appeared that year on You Asked for It.)
- Sequel to Mother Riley Meets the Vampire – Lugosi was offered the lead role in a proposed 1953 sequel to the Mother Riley comedy film he made in England in 1951, provided he travel back to England to appear in it. This sequel was never made however as Lugosi was too ill at the time to travel. In 1953, Ed Wood's friend producer Alex Gordon proposed creating an extended version of the 1951 film to be called King Robot which would incorporate newly filmed footage of Lugosi shot in Hollywood. The project was abandoned since by that time, Lugosi appeared too ill to match the earlier footage.
- The Six Arms of Siva – This was a 1953 adventure novel written by Walter C. Brown which Wood and Lugosi were considering buying the film rights to, but the deal fell through.
- The Vampire's Tomb – This was a planned July, 1954 horror film starring Bela Lugosi as the "Dr. Acula" character again. The cast would also have included Loretta King, Bobby Jordan (of The Bowery Boys), Dolores Fuller, Lyle Talbot, Duke Moore, Tom Keene and a Vampira-lookalike named "Devila". Wood's plot was very similar to that of Tod Browning's London After Midnight, only with a female vampire. Wood shelved this project and filmed Bride of the Monster instead. Wood however did film some test footage of Lugosi wearing his Dracula cape in a local graveyard for this project which became part of the stock footage which was later incorporated into Wood's 1957 Plan 9 from Outer Space film.
- Doctor Voodoo (a.k.a. Voodoo Doctor) – A projected 1954 horror film (similar in plot to the 1934 Universal film The Black Cat) that was supposed to have starred both Bela Lugosi and Boris Karloff, but Allied Artists rejected the script. It is said Karloff really wanted no part in the project anyway.
- The Ghoul Goes West (or The Phantom Ghoul) – Wood worked on this script for two years, and had planned to produce it in Color/ Widescreen (and possibly 3-D). It was a proposed 1955 Western/Horror film that would have starred Gene Autry, Bela Lugosi, Tor Johnson, Lon Chaney Jr. and John Carradine, with Harold Daniels slated to direct. The plot was very similar to that of Bride of the Monster, only in a Western setting. Gene Autry dropped out, and Wood tried to replace him with either Bob Steele or Ken Maynard, to no avail. Lugosi was reading the script the whole time he was confined to the Norwalk State Hospital in 1955, where he was being treated for drug addiction. Coincidentally, Lugosi, Chaney, Tor Johnson and Carradine all appeared together the following year in The Black Sleep (a project that did not involve Ed Wood).
- Repeat Performance – This was a 1956 movie script that was written by Richard Sheffield, a Hollywood teenager who was a close personal friend of Bela Lugosi. He sold the script to Ed Wood for $1.00, but the film was never made since Wood was unable to interest financiers. The plot involved a "poor, retired actor of horror films" who is cast aside and rejected by the four film producers he once worked for, and he winds up murdering all four of them "in a gruesome manner similar to the way he was killed in many of his horror films". This may have been Wood's inspiration for his 1958 proposal to Sam Arkoff, which Wood claimed was stolen from him and later became AIP's How to Make a Monster (1958 film). (see below under 1958).
- Rock and Rock Hell (or Hellborn) – Wood's version of Rebel Without a Cause, it was supposed to have starred Conrad Brooks, Duke Moore, Tom Mason and Wood himself, to be produced by George Weiss. It began shooting in June 1956, but Weiss decided to abandon the project and sold the ten minutes of footage they shot to Conrad Brooks. Footage from this film was later incorporated into Wood's 1959 Night of the Ghouls.
- The Dead Never Die – Criswell and Paul Marco came up with the story for this 1957 project, which Wood was slated to direct. It would've starred Criswell, Paul Marco, Bunny Breckinridge and Vampira (Maila Nurmi), but it never got off the ground.
- How to Make a Monster – Wood's widow Kathy claimed in a 1992 interview that her husband always felt that the idea for How to Make a Monster was stolen from him by AIP producer Sam Arkoff. She said, "Eddie condemned Arkoff, he really hated him. Eddie gave (AIP) a script for approval, and they changed the characters a little bit around. Eddie had written it for Lugosi (circa 1956). It was about this old horror actor who couldn't get work anymore, so he took his vengeance out on the studio. They changed it to a make-up man who takes revenge on a studio." Arkoff always denied Wood's claim was true, stating Herman Cohen originated the entire project.
- Masquerade into Eternity – A 1959 Cold War political drama that Wood was supposed to write and direct, about a troupe of actors who get stranded in post-Revolution Cuba; it was to be produced by Ben Frommer, who was slated to play a Communist Colonel, but the project fell through.
- House of Horrors – Kenne Duncan and Tor Johnson were supposed to star in this 1960 film, which never materialized. Kenne Duncan was to play a mad artist who paints pictures of kidnapped women he confines in a dungeon, while Tor played a Lobo-like henchman.
- Portraits in Terror – A 1960 made-for-TV trilogy consisting of three episodes; it was to include "The Final Curtain", "The Night the Banshee Cried" and Into My Grave (all written and directed by Wood), but the project fell through, with only the first two installments produced.
- Tangier – A 1966 proposed action-adventure TV series that was supposed to be produced by Wood's friend Stephen Apostoloff. Wood wrote a sample screenplay for the series which was never produced.
- 69 Rue Pigalle – In 1966, Stephen Apostoloff was set to produce and direct a film called 69 Rue Pigalle, based on Ed Wood's novel Parisian Passions, but the financing never materialized. The plot was supposed to be about a transvestite who solves a series of murders in Paris, and Lon Chaney Jr. was supposed to have been in the cast.
- The Enchanted Isle – An unfilmed 1966 Ed Wood screenplay for a film that was supposed to feature Lon Chaney Jr., Dana Andrews and John Ireland, about a Mafia princess stranded on a South Sea island and a mystery involving black pearls. (Wood originally wrote the screenplay back in 1954 and had tried at that time to interest producer Ron Ormond in the project, unsuccessfully.)
- Devil Girls – An unrealized 1967 Crime Drama about a drug-smuggling teenage girl gang who hang out at a seedy hamburger joint. Tor Johnson was to have played the brutish "Chief", a goon who works for a retired race car driver named "Jockey". It was based on Wood's eponymous novel.
- The Life of Mickey Cohen – A 1967 proposed Crime Drama Wood was working on, in which Paul Marco was supposed to play the infamous gangster (a full decade after Marco appeared in Plan 9 From Outer Space). (At this point, Wood's career became primarily focused on the pornographic industry.)
- The Day the Mummies Danced – A 1976 unproduced Ed Wood script that was supposed to be Wood's long-awaited return to directing horror films; it was set to star John Agar (a long-time drinking buddy of Wood's), Aldo Ray and Dudley Manlove (who was also supposed to produce the film). The filming was set to take place in Guanajuato, Mexico at the famous Mexican mummies exhibit there, but it never happened.

Wood's list of unrealized film projects also included scripts called The Peeper (a proposed 1960 sequel to The Sinister Urge), Joaquin Murieta (a 1965 biopic about the infamous bandit of the Old West), To Kill a Saturday Night (1973, which was set to star John Carradine), I Awoke Early the Day I Died (1974, a rewrite of Wood's unmade 1961 Silent Night), Heads, No Tails (1974, a take-off on Sweeney Todd), and Shoot Seven (1977, Wood's proposed musical based on the St. Valentine's Day Massacre).

== Personal life ==
=== Relationships and marriages ===
Wood was in a long-term relationship with actress and songwriter Dolores Fuller, whom he met in late 1952. She was in the process of divorcing her first husband Donald Fuller, with whom she had had two sons. Wood and Fuller shared an apartment for three years, and Wood cast her in three of his films: Glen or Glenda, Jail Bait and, in a very brief cameo, in Bride of the Monster. Fuller later said she initially had no idea that Wood was a crossdresser and was mortified when she saw Wood dressed as a woman for the first time in Glen or Glenda. The couple broke up in 1955 after Wood cast another actress for the lead role in Bride of the Monster (Wood originally wrote the part for Fuller but later reduced her part to a brief cameo appearance) and because of Wood's excessive drinking. Fuller relocated to New York City where she embarked on a successful songwriting career, writing for famous singers like Elvis Presley and Nat King Cole. Fuller died on May 9, 2011, at age 88.

In 1956, soon after his breakup with Fuller, Wood married actress Norma McCarty. McCarty appeared as Edie, the airplane stewardess, in Plan 9 from Outer Space, and was recently divorced with two sons, Mike and John McCarty, from her earlier marriage. The marriage took Wood's friends by surprise; one night, Wood called everyone to the sound stage for what they thought was a cast party, but when everyone was present, Wood brought out a huge wedding cake and a preacher, and announced he was getting married. The marriage ended approximately one month later after McCarty discovered that Wood was a crossdresser, and while it has been reported that their marriage was annulled, according to film archivist Wade Williams, they neither annulled the marriage nor legally divorced. McCarty died on June 27, 2014, at age 93.

Wood moved in with his friend Paul Marco for a short while after McCarty left him. Later in 1956, Wood met Kathy O'Hara in a bar one night where he was drinking with Bela Lugosi. O'Hara fell in love with Wood immediately; they were married in Las Vegas a short while later, and Wood always considered O'Hara his legal wife despite the fact that his first marriage had not been legally annulled. Wood and O'Hara remained together until Wood's death in December 1978. O'Hara never got along with his mother Lillian, calling her "a strict disciplinarian" who damaged Wood psychologically from early childhood. Wood occasionally sent money to his mother in the mail without O'Hara's knowledge. O'Hara died on June 26, 2006, due to esophageal cancer. She was 84 years old.

=== Alleged daughter ===
Wood was shocked to learn he had fathered a child out of wedlock after World War II with a young woman he had dated while he was in the Marines. According to Conrad Brooks, Wood and his wife Kathy only met the woman (also named Kathy) in 1967 when she was already 21 years old. Born on May 23, 1946, she had been living in Lancaster, California, and had managed to trace her father's whereabouts. Wood's mother Lillian said she had been contacted by the girl back in 1963 when she sent his mother a photo and introduced herself to Lillian as her granddaughter. Lillian said she sent the girl a watch for her graduation in 1964, but never heard back from her.

There is a photo of the young woman in Rudolph Grey's biography on Wood. She visited the Woods and stayed over at their house for a couple of days, but apparently the two women did not get along well. In fact, Wood's wife physically threw her out of the house on the second day when she found her sleeping on their sofa.

Wood's wife Kathy never believed that the girl was Wood's daughter, saying in an interview, "There was never any proof, only the woman's statement on a birth certificate." Wood told Kathy that the woman he had sex with in 1946 used to sleep around regularly "with 10 or 20 other Marines at the base", so he probably wasn't the girl's father. She said, "She's not your daughter, that bitch lied to you! The father could have been anyone. There's only her accusation."

Actress Valda Hansen said, "I met Ed's daughter at his house in the Valley. She looked just like him. Beautiful, delicate. Green eyes, dark chocolate brown hair. She was very sweet." Art director Bob Derteno, who worked with Wood on Orgy of the Dead, said that Wood later travelled to attend his daughter's wedding in New York and was later told that Wood had become a grandfather.

=== Cross-dressing ===
In Rudolph Grey's 1992 biography Nightmare of Ecstasy: The Life and Art of Edward D. Wood Jr., Wood's wife Kathy O'Hara recalls that Wood told her that his mother dressed him in girls' clothing as a child. O'Hara stated that Wood's cross-dressing was not a sexual inclination, but rather a neomaternal comfort derived mainly from angora fabric (angora is featured in many of Wood's films). Even in his later years, Wood was not shy about going out in public dressed in drag as "Shirley", his female alter ego (a name that appeared in many of his screenplays and stories). In his partly autobiographical film Glen or Glenda, the heterosexual Wood takes pains to emphasize that a male cross-dresser is not automatically also a homosexual. In a 1996 interview, American International Pictures co-founder Sam Arkoff said Wood came into his office for the first time dressed as a woman. Wood directed many of his pornographic films in drag, but usually would not take the time to shave, which made for a bizarre sight, according to his friends. Wood always swore that he had never had a single homosexual relationship in his life, and was even considered quite a womanizer by many of his acquaintances. He once said that if he could have anything in life, it would be reincarnation as a blonde woman.

== Later years ==
During the last 15 years of his life, Wood depended almost entirely on writing pornographic novels to earn a living, receiving an average of $1,000 per novel which he spent almost immediately on alcohol at the local liquor store. Friends have stated how, in his final years, he eventually stopped bathing, and that his apartment became so filthy that he eventually would not allow friends to come over and visit because he knew they would be horrified to see how unkempt it had become. Paul Marco said Wood was constantly moaning, "My God, I've given everything away. I should be a millionaire. I should have a million bucks right now!"

Actor John Agar, an alcoholic himself, was drinking at Wood's apartment one day in the late 1960s when the afternoon news program erroneously announced Agar's obituary. Wood called the studio and told them that Agar was not dead. He told them "He's alive... he's sitting right here with me now!". The story was corrected shortly thereafter.

Ed Wood and his wife were routinely evicted from their apartments for non-payment of rent. Each time they moved, Wood would immediately establish credit with the liquor store nearest his new address. Their last apartment was in a high-crime ghetto area at the corner of Yucca and Cahuenga, Hollywood inhabited by drug addicts, gamblers and prostitutes. Wood, who regularly pawned his typewriters for cash, was mugged regularly when he would stumble down the street to the liquor store. Eventually he had his publisher send his paychecks directly to the various liquor store owners so that he would not have to carry cash when he went there.

The Woods' apartment was always in danger of being burglarized. One night, a cross-dresser was beaten to death in the hallway just outside Wood's apartment door and the sound of gunshots outside the building was a nightly occurrence.

According to friends, Wood and his wife often became violent when they drank. Stories abound of the two beating each other; Wood sometimes knocked Kathy unconscious. Criswell commented once, "I always had the feeling that one would kill the other. And if you were there, the killer would say you did it!" Nonetheless, years after Wood's death, his wife always professed to love him dearly.

Bela Lugosi biographer Robert Cremer interviewed Wood once in his Yucca apartment for his 1976 book Lugosi: The Man Behind the Cape two years before Wood died. Cremer said Wood began the interview sober, but quickly became intoxicated over the next hour as the interview proceeded. Cremer said, "He started getting really angry at me because he felt he was the person who should be writing (the book)... He went out in the kitchen, grabbed a bottle of Wild Turkey... He smashed the bottle on the kitchen counter and then came after me with it. He lunged at me, but he was so drunk, I just pushed him against the wall, and he collapsed. I just walked out the door and said 'Okay Ed, I guess that was our last interview. I'll see you.'"

== Death ==
By 1978, Wood's depression had worsened as he and his wife Kathy O'Hara had both succumbed to alcoholism. They were evicted from their Hollywood apartment on Yucca Street on December 7, 1978, in total poverty by two sheriff's deputies called by their landlord for failure to pay their overdue rent. Wood had to leave behind all of his scrapbooks and unfinished screenplays, which the landlord allegedly threw into a garbage dumpster. Wood's large film collection of his early commercials were also thrown out following his eviction. The couple moved into the small North Hollywood apartment of their friend, actor Peter Coe, located at 5636 Laurel Canyon Boulevard. Wood spent the weekend drinking vodka and desperately calling old friends for money, but to no avail.

Around noon on Sunday, December 10, Wood felt ill and went to lie down in Coe's bedroom while Coe, O'Hara and a few friends were watching a football game on TV. From the bedroom, he asked O'Hara to bring him a drink, which she refused to do. A few minutes later, he yelled out, "Kathy, I can't breathe!", a plea O'Hara ignored as she later said she was tired of Wood bossing her around. After hearing no movement in the bedroom for twenty minutes, O'Hara sent a female friend to check on Wood, who discovered him dead on the bed from a heart attack. O'Hara later said, "I still remember when I went into that room that afternoon and he was dead, his eyes and mouth were wide open. I'll never forget the look in his eyes. He clutched at the sheets. It looked like he'd seen hell."

Wood was cremated at the Utter-McKinley mortuary, and his ashes were scattered at sea. Paul Marco, O'Hara, David DeMering and The Amazing Criswell attended Wood's makeshift memorial service, which was held at Peter Coe's apartment following the cremation. Marco recalled how devastated O'Hara was at the time.

== Legacy and homages ==
At the time of his death, Wood's name and career had become so obscure that most local Los Angeles newspapers, including the entertainment magazine Variety, did not run an obituary about him.

The 1982 film It Came from Hollywood featured a "Tribute to Ed Wood" segment.

In 1986 in an essay paying homage to Wood in Incredibly Strange Films, Jim Morton wrote: "Eccentric and individualistic, Edward D. Wood Jr. was a man born to film. [...] Lesser men, if forced to make movies under the conditions Wood faced, would have thrown up their hands in defeat".

In 1994, director Tim Burton released the biopic Ed Wood, starring Johnny Depp in the title role and Martin Landau, who won an Academy Award for Best Supporting Actor for his portrayal of Bela Lugosi. It also won an Academy Award for Best Makeup for Rick Baker. Conrad Brooks appeared in the movie in a cameo role as "Barman", along with Gregory Walcott in the role of a potential backer. The film premiered on September 30, 1994, just ten days before what would have been Wood's 70th birthday. Despite receiving critical acclaim, the movie did poorly at the box office; however, it has since developed a cult following.

In 1996, Reverend Steve Galindo of Seminole, Oklahoma, created a legally recognized religion with Wood as its official savior. Founded as a joke, the Church of Ed Wood now boasts more than 3,500 baptized followers. Woodites, as Galindo's followers are called, celebrate "Woodmas" on October 10, which was Wood's birthday. Numerous parties and concerts are held worldwide to celebrate Woodmas. On October 4–5, 2003, horror host Mr. Lobo was canonized as the "Patron Saint of late night movie hosts and insomniacs" in the Church of Ed Wood.

In 1997 the University of Southern California began holding an annual Ed Wood Film Festival, in which student teams are challenged to write, film, and edit an Ed Wood-inspired short film based on a preassigned theme. Past themes have included Rebel Without a Bra (2004), What's That in Your Pocket? (2005), and Slippery When Wet (2006).

American singer songwriter Will Wood derives his pseudonym from Ed Wood. Will's songs and performances often reference mental instability, struggles with alcohol and drugs use, and transvestism as a tribute to the late director.

=== Documentaries ===
- The Incredibly Strange Film Show (Season 2, Episode 4), presented by Jonathan Ross. It was first broadcast Oct. 13, 1989. Guests interviewed included actors Vampira (aka Maila Nurmi), Norma McCarty, Paul Marco, Dolores Fuller, biographer Rudolph Grey and critic Harry Medved.
- Flying Saucers Over Hollywood: The Plan 9 Companion, was released in 1992. This exhaustive two-hour documentary by Mark Patrick Carducci chronicles the making of Plan 9 from Outer Space and features interviews with Vampira, Paul Marco, Conrad Brooks, Joe Dante, Valda Hansen, artist Drew Friedman, Forrest J. Ackerman, Gary Gerani, Sam Raimi, Kathy Wood, Carl Anthony, Harry Thomas, Gregory Walcott, Stephen Apostolof, Martha Mason, Norma McCarty, Dolores Fuller, et al. In 2000, Image Entertainment included the documentary on the DVD reissue of Plan 9 from Outer Space (in a two-disc set with Robot Monster).
- The Haunted World of Edward D. Wood Jr., written and directed by Brett Thompson, came out in 1995. This 90-minute documentary—about the life and films of Ed Wood—features interviews with Wood's friends and co-workers, and closely resembles Wood's own style albeit with slightly better miniatures. People interviewed included Maila Nurmi, Bela Lugosi Jr., Dolores Fuller, Paul Marco, Conrad Brooks, Loretta King, Lyn Lemon, Norma McCarty and her son Mike, Mona McKinnon, Lyle Talbot, Gregory Walcott, Crawford John Thomas, makeup man Harry Thomas and Ed Wood himself.
- Dad Made Dirty Movies (2011) Wood biographer Rudolph Grey produced this one-hour documentary about the life and career of 1960s porn film producer Stephen Apostolof, detailing his x-rated co-productions with Wood.

=== Lost films ===
Wood's 1972 film The Undergraduate was a lost film, as was his 1970 film Take It Out in Trade, but they both eventually turned up years later. (Both films in their entirety are now available on DVD.)

An 80-minute print of Take It Out in Trade was discovered and publicly exhibited at Anthology Film Archives in New York City in September 2014. Silent outtakes from the film were released by Something Weird Video.

Wood's 1971 film Necromania was also believed lost for years, until an edited version resurfaced at a yard sale in 1992, followed in 2001 by a complete, unedited print.

A complete print of Wood's lost 1972 pornographic film The Young Marrieds was discovered in 2004. It was released by Alpha Blue Archives in July 2014 as a part of the four-DVD set The Lost Sex Films of Ed Wood Jr..

Wood is said to have filmed some scenes of Lon Chaney Jr. in a werewolf costume in Hollywood in 1964 that were said to have been incorporated into Jerry Warren's film Face of the Screaming Werewolf (1965). Chaney biographer Don G. Smith however has stated that this story was never substantiated.

=== Actors ===
	Glen or Glenda	Crossroad Avenger	Jail Bait	Bride of the Monster	Final Curtain	Plan 9 from Outer Space	Night of the Ghouls	The Sinister Urge	Take It Out in Trade	Crossroads of Laredo	Total
Criswell						X mark	X mark				2
Carl Anthony						X mark		X mark			2
Conrad Brooks	X mark		X mark	X mark		X mark	X mark	X mark			6
Kenne Duncan		X mark					X mark	X mark			3
Harvey B. Dunn		X mark		X mark			X mark	X mark			4
Timothy Farrell	X mark		X mark								2
Dolores Fuller	X mark		X mark	X mark						X mark	4
Tor Johnson				X mark		X mark	X mark				3
Tom Keene		X mark				X mark					2
Bela Lugosi	X mark			X mark		X mark					3
Dudley Manlove					X mark	X mark					2
Paul Marco				X mark		X mark	X mark				3
Tom Mason						X mark	X mark				2
Duke Moore					X mark	X mark	X mark	X mark	X mark	X mark	6
Bud Osborne		X mark	X mark	X mark			X mark				4
Lyle Talbot	X mark	X mark	X mark			X mark					4
Ed Wood	X mark	X mark				X mark	X mark	X mark	X mark		6

== Filmography ==
Directed features
Year	Title	Distributor
1953	Glen or Glenda	Screen Classics
1954	Jail Bait	Howco Productions
1955	Bride of the Monster	Banner Pictures
1957	Plan 9 from Outer Space	Distributors Corporation of America
1960	The Sinister Urge	Headliner Productions
1970	Take It Out in Trade	Ashdown-Gonzalez Productions
1971	Necromania	Stacey Distributors
1984	Night of the Ghouls	Wade Williams Productions

== See also ==
- List of films considered the worst
- B movie
- Z movie
- Tanio Boccia, nicknamed the "Italian Ed Wood"
- Jesus Franco, nicknamed the "European Ed Wood"
- Sam Singer, nicknamed the "Ed Wood of Animation"
- John Waters
- Herschell Gordon Lewis
- Bert I. Gordon
- William C. Thompson was Wood's cinematographer for all but Take It Out in Trade.

== Other references ==
- Benshoff, Harry M. (1997). Monsters in the Closet: Homosexuality and the Horror Film. Manchester University Press. ISBN 0-7190-4473-1.
- Craig, Rob (2009). Ed Wood, Mad Genius: A Critical Study of the Films. McFarland. ISBN 978-0-7864-5423-5.
- Ford, Luke (1999). A History of X: 100 Years of Sex in Film. Prometheus Books. ISBN 1-61592-631-3.
- Gerstner, David A., ed. (2006). Routledge International Encyclopedia of Queer Culture. Routledge. ISBN 0-415-30651-5.
- Grey, Rudolph (1994). Nightmare of Ecstasy: The Life and Art of Edward D. Wood Jr. Feral House. ISBN 0-922915-24-5.
- Hoberman, J.; Rosenbaum, Jonathan (2009). Midnight Movies. Basic Books. ISBN 978-0-7867-4700-9.
- Morton, Jim (1986). Juno, Andrea; Vale, V. (eds.). Incredibly Strange Films (1 ed.). San Francisco, California: RE/Search. ISBN 0-940642-09-3.
- Pontolillo, James (2017). The Unknown War of Edward D. Wood, Jr.: 1942 - 1946. Self-published. ISBN 978-1-5488-6947-2.
- Weaver, Tom, ed. (2004). It Came From Horrorwood: Interviews With Moviemakers In The Science Fiction And Horror Tradition. McFarland. ISBN 0-7864-2069-3.
- Weldon, Michael (1996). The Psychotronic Video Guide. Titan Books. ISBN 1-85286-770-1.
