= Necromania =

1971 film by Ed Wood

- Directed by: Ed Wood
- Written by: Ed Wood
- Based on: The Only House by Ed Wood
- Produced by: Ed Wood
- Starring: Maria Arnold; Rene Bond
- Edited by: Ed Wood
- Distributed by: Stacey Distributors
- Release date: 1971
- Running time: 51 min. (R-rated); 54 min. (X-rated)
- Country: United States
- Language: English
- Budget: $7,000

Necromania (sometimes subtitled A Tale of Weird Love) is a pornographic horror film by Ed Wood, released in 1971. It was produced, written, directed and edited entirely by Wood. The screenplay was based on Wood's own novel, The Only House.

== Plot ==
A young couple, Danny and Shirley Carpenter, drives up to an old mansion in suburban California. They knock first, then enter through the unlocked door. They bicker over the decision to enter unannounced. In a room decorated with occult-related items and containing a coffin, Danny and Shirley are greeted by Tanya. They are there to see necromancer Madame Heles (pronounced "heals") for a solution to Danny's erectile dysfunction. Tanya leads them to a room prepared for their stay. When left alone, the Carpenters resume bickering over their sexual dysfunction. They fail to notice Tanya's eyes watching them through the holes in a painting.

Tanya returns to the room with the coffin and sexually stimulates herself by a ritual of sex magic. Speaking to the coffin, Tanya informs someone that their suspicions were correct; the Carpenters are not married. The significance of this information is not explained. Tanya leaves the room and encounters a man called Carl, who demands to have sex with her, claiming that he paid plenty to be the first to have her. Tanya makes clear that she does not have to service him, but does so anyway out of pity for his sexual frustration.

Back in their room, the Carpenters have their own sexual session, perhaps in an attempt at self-healing. Danny cannot achieve a full erection, however, leaving Shirley unsatisfied. She leaves the room in search of something to satisfy her needs. She is startled by a stuffed wolf in the corridor. Another young woman in a nightgown approaches Shirley and explains that this wolf died of rabies. The woman introduces herself as Barb, an "inmate" of Madame Heles. She compliments Shirley on her beauty, and starts petting her, leading to sex between the two.

Danny wakes up from a nap and heads out to search for Shirley. Barb and Shirley have moved their lovemaking to another bedroom. Danny instead meets Tanya, who leads him to yet another bedroom and seduces him. Two parallel sex scenes follow. The lesbian one is depicted as mutually satisfying, while the heterosexual one only benefits Danny. Tanya leads Danny to a window, where group sex is seen through a prism. Tanya explains that not all people react to "the treatment" successfully. The people depicted through the window are those who will never find satisfaction in their sex lives, as some want too much and others too little. Danny realizes that his own reaction to the treatment was not the proper one. Tanya assures him that he is not like them, since they are lost forever; they can never return to a world which will reject them.

Tanya and Barb lead their lovers to the room with the coffin. Danny and Shirley seem hostile to each other. Tanya and Barb kneel before the coffin and have sex. In reaction, Shirley swoons, while Danny groans in displeasure. The sexual ritual summons Madame Heles from her coffin. Heles asks about the progress of her two newest students. Barb praises Shirley's prowess; in response, Heles proclaims that Shirley will henceforth live for sex alone.

As Shirley walks away with Barb, Danny is left behind. Tanya declares that they still have some work to do on him. Heles proclaims that he needs her personal sex teachings. Barb and Carl enter the room. They help Tanya restrain Danny and take off his clothes. They force him to enter Heles' coffin and then depart. At first, Danny screams, but then he enjoys his healing session with Heles.

== Cast ==
- Marie Arnold (billed as Maria) as Tanya
- Rene Bond as Shirley
- Ric Lutze as Danny

== Production ==
Ed Wood produced, wrote, and directed the film under the pseudonym "Don Miller". The title seems to imply necrophilia, but the content implies an obsession with Death. The film was based on the novel The Only House (1970), also written by Wood. Rob Craig observes that certain elements of the original story were "slavishly" adapted, while others were altered or removed in their entirety. For example, in the novel the rituals of sex magic are depicted in detail, and the Carpenters are actually married, not pretending to be.

The film was shot on a budget of US$7,000. According to Charles Anderson, a Wood collaborator, the director himself played a role in the film. Anderson recalled this role to be a wizard or an evil doctor, but no such role appears in the finished film. Craig suspects it was in a deleted scene.

A coffin owned by The Amazing Criswell is seen in the film, the second of Wood's films (after Night of the Ghouls) in which such a coffin appears. Criswell's family was in the mortician business. The coffin used in Necromania, however, looks antique. According to cinematographer Ted Gorley, Criswell had meant to donate his own coffin, but the crew of the film borrowed the wrong coffin. The one used in the film was a relic dating to Abraham Lincoln's presidency (1861–1865).

In Rudolph Grey's 1992 Ed Wood biography Nightmare of Ecstasy: The Life and Art of Edward D. Wood, Jr., Maila Nurmi, who played Vampira on TV and in Plan 9 from Outer Space, tells the story of how she declined Wood's request for her to do a nude scene sitting up in a coffin in the role of Madame Heles. Nurmi said she was dumbfounded at how Wood had found her after so many years. She was recovering from a stroke and told him that she could hardly walk. Wood told her on the phone: "It's OK, it doesn't matter. You can sit up, can't you? You've got nothing on, you're in this coffin and you just sit up. And this guy jumps on you and [howls like a wolf]". Then he promised her $100 for doing the scene. Nurmi declined. Wood hired another actress for the scene, and made her up to look like Vampira.

During the two-day shoot, Wood directed the film in a pink baby doll nightie and a bra. It was so hot in the studio that actress Rene Bond fainted and the crew had to throw water on her face.

Wood's friend John Andrews acted as his assistant on the project. He said the Arriflex camera Wood was using would jam up constantly, and when he suggested that Wood use an Eclair camera instead with a specific Zoom lens, he was surprised that Wood did not seem to know what he was talking about.

== Analysis ==
The film was an early entry to the new subgenre of hardcore pornographic film. The pioneers of the subgenre were films such as Mona the Virgin Nymph (1970) by Howard Ziehm and Sex USA (1970) by Gerard Damiano. The subgenre went on to enter the mainstream with Deep Throat (1972). The idea of graphic sex as an integral part of an adult-oriented narrative was further explored in Last Tango in Paris (1972) by Bernardo Bertolucci, Sodom and Gomorrah: The Last Seven Days (1974) by Artie Mitchell, and The Opening of Misty Beethoven (1976) by Radley Metzger. As a narrative-driven film, Rob Craig argues that Necromania can also be considered part of the Golden Age of Porn, along with these films.

Wood included the reference to Bela Lugosi as a tribute to his deceased friend, who appeared in Wood's films Bride of the Monster and Glen or Glenda? prior to his death in 1956.

The front door is decorated with the image of a trident. Rob Craig suggests that it can also be seen as the pitchfork of a devil.

The spying eyes, seen through a painting are part of a trope derived from films featuring haunted houses.

Craig sees the group sex sessions seen through the prism as a depiction of the then-ongoing Sexual Revolution.

== Rediscovery ==
Thought considered lost for years, it resurfaced in edited form on Mike Vraney's Something Weird imprint in the late 1980s, then was re-released on DVD by Fleshbot Films in 2005. Opening titles indicate "Produced & directed by Don Miller. Our cast wish to remain anonymous".

The film magazine Cult Movies (issue #36) printed a detailed article about the rediscovery of Wood's Necromania and The Only House in Town. The piece was written by Rudolph Grey, author of the Wood biography Nightmare of Ecstasy.

== Critical reception ==
Writing in AllMovie, critic Fred Beldin noted that "a few of the transvestite auteur's trademark eccentricities [...] emerge for those familiar with his work. The score is wildly inappropriate, spy-movie style bombast, and occasionally, some amusing non-sequitur will slip out of an actor's mouth," and "despite Necromania's occult themes (which weren't completely unusual for the era), it's a fairly ordinary pornographic film, making for a strange coda to an otherwise wholly idiosyncratic career." A review of the film in DVD Drive-In reported that "for a 52-minute film (or should it be called a short?), there is very little in the way of plot or dialogue, but what lines are spoken are typical Wood genius," that "the up-close-and-clinical hardcore sex is anything but sexy, and in fact may invite fast-forwarding," and noted that "once you get past the genealogical bumping and grinding, Necromania is an enjoyable curio for Ed Wood fans and little more."

== Sources ==
- Craig, Rob (2009). "Necromania—A Tale of Weird Love (1971)". Ed Wood, Mad Genius: A Critical Study of the Films. Jefferson, North Carolina: McFarland & Company. ISBN 978-0786454235.
- Grey, Rudolph (1992). Nightmare of Ecstasy: The Life and Art of Edward D. Wood, Jr. Port Townsend, Washington: Feral House. ISBN 978-0-922915-24-8.
- The Haunted World of Edward D. Wood, Jr. (1996), documentary film directed by Brett Thompson
