= Rudolph Grey =

American musician and author

- Genres: No wave; free jazz
- Occupations: Musician; author
- Instrument: Electric guitar
- Years active: 1990s–present
- Label: New Alliance
- Member of: Mars; The Blue Humans

Rudolph Grey is an American musician and the biographer of filmmaker Ed Wood.

As an electric guitarist, Grey has recorded and performed with Mars, with John Giorno in the opera Agamemon (1993), and under his own name. He has also as led and recorded with various ad hoc ensembles called The Blue Humans. His music draws on no wave and free jazz.

Grey is also a motion-picture historian and wrote Nightmare of Ecstasy (1992), a biography of Ed Wood, the director of notoriously awful cult films. Tim Burton's 1994 film Ed Wood was based on Grey's book.

In 2001, in a Los Angeles warehouse, Grey rediscovered a copy of Ed Wood's final feature-length film, Necromania, which had been presumed to be lost.

In 2011, Grey produced a one-hour documentary called Dad Made Dirty Movies, about the life and career of the 1960s porn-film producer Stephen C. Apostolof, detailing his co-productions with Ed Wood.

== Discography ==
=== As leader ===
- Mask of Light (New Alliance, 1991)
- Transfixed (New Alliance, 1994)

As The Blue Humans

- Clear to Higher Time (New Alliance, 1993) – studio recording 1991; produced by Thurston Moore
- To Higher Time (New Alliance, 1993) – Live at CBGB, 1990
- Incandescence (Shock, 1995) – Live at CBGB; opening for Sonic Youth
- Live NY 1980 (Audible Hiss, 1995) – with Beaver Harris and Arthur Doyle
- Live in London 1994 (Blast First, 1996) – with Charles Gayle and Tom Surgal

=== As member/sideman ===
With Mars

Live at Irving Plaza (Feeding Tube / Negative Glam, 2012) – rec. 1978; featured musician on the track "Nn End"

With Red Transistor

- "Not Bite" / "We're Not Crazy" (Ecstatic Peace!, 1990) – 7″ single recorded in 1977 by Red Star Records

With others

- Arthur Doyle, Live at the Cooler (The Lotus Sound, 1996)

== Selected bibliography ==
- Nightmare of Ecstasy: The Life and Art of Edward D. Wood Jr. Feral House. 1992. ISBN 978-0-922915-04-0. Biography of Ed Wood.
