= Bela G. Lugosi =

American attorney and businessperson (born 1938)

Béla G. Lugosi
- Born: Béla George Lugosi; January 5, 1938 (age 88); Los Angeles, California, U.S.
- Other name: Béla Lugosi Jr.
- Education: University of Southern California (BS, LLB)
- Occupations: Lawyer; Producer
- Spouse: Nancy Beauchamp (m. 1957; died 2022)
- Children: 4
- Parent(s): Béla Lugosi; Lillian Arch

Béla George Lugosi (born January 5, 1938) (/ləˈɡoʊsi/, lə-GOH-she; Hungarian: [ˈluɡoʃi]) is an American attorney and the son of actor Béla Lugosi, the latter best remembered for portraying Count Dracula in the horror film classic Dracula (1931) and roles in many other horror films. Lugosi is often referred to as Béla Lugosi Jr. His legal actions in Lugosi v. Universal Pictures led to the creation of the California Celebrities Rights Act.

== Biography ==
Lugosi attended the University of Southern California, where he received his B.S. in 1960 and LL.B. from its School of Law in 1964. He was admitted to the State Bar of California that year. He practiced for much of his career at Hanna & Morton, a Los Angeles litigation boutique. For several years in the late 1990s and early 2000s, he was an executive at C3 Entertainment, Inc., the holding company founded by The Three Stooges. He resigned from the bar in 2018. In 2022, he was inducted into the Rondo Hatton Classic Horror Awards' Monster Kid Hall of Fame.

== Personal life ==
Lugosi met Nancy Beauchamp while both were students at Dorsey High School, marrying in 1957. The marriage lasted 64 years until her death in January 2022. He has four children, sons Greg, Jeff, and Tim, and daughter Lynne Sparks, as well as seven grandchildren.

Lugosi has been among those who felt filmmaker Edward D. Wood Jr. exploited his father's stardom, taking advantage of the fading actor when he could not refuse any work. Most documents and interviews with other Wood associates in Nightmare of Ecstasy suggest that Wood and Lugosi were genuine friends and that Wood helped Lugosi through the worst days of his depression and drug addiction.
