= Fandor =

Film streaming service

- Type: Subscription independent film streaming service
- Founded: March 2011
- Founder: Philip Hopkins
- Headquarters: New York City, New York, United States
- Area served: United States, Canada
- Key people: Philip Hopkins (President)
- Products: Fandor: www.fandor.com Keyframe: keyframe.fandor.com
- Services: Independent Film Streaming Service
- Owner: Cineverse (2021-present), Our Film Festival, Inc. (2011-2021)
- Website: www.fandor.com

Fandor is a division of the American entertainment company Cineverse. It is a streaming service dedicated to independent films, documentaries, international titles and classics.

== History ==
Fandor was founded in 2010 in San Francisco, California by Dan Aronson, Jonathan Marlow and Albert Reinhardt. Fandor announced its initial launch in 2011 at SXSW. Leadership has included former Facebook chief privacy officer Chris Kelly, independent film producer and former director of the San Francisco Film Society Ted Hope and Larry Aidem, former Sundance Channel head. In 2018, Fandor announced the layoff of its staff and the sale of its assets to an undisclosed investment firm.

In January 2021, American independent entertainment company Cinedigm announced the acquisition of Fandor, with plans to relaunch the service and the digital editorial publication Keyframe. Cinedigm announced that Fandor would relaunch under the leadership of film producer, film archivist and president of The Film Detective Philip Hopkins. Fandor returned to SXSW, ten years after its initial launch, to announce the return of the service, dedicated to cinephile culture and independent filmmakers.

In October 2021, Fandor launched its revamped independent streaming service, with a focus on independent films, documentaries, international titles and classics.

== Services ==
Fandor offers over 1,300 independent films from many genres and subgenres ranging from comedy, drama and festival favorites to those of the pre-Code, creature feature and film noir genres.

Fandor is available to stream for free with ads or as a paid premium subscription on the Fandor app, available across web, iOS, Android and Roku. Fandor is also available as an add-on channel on Amazon Prime, available for $3.99 per month following a seven-day free trial. Fandor is also available on Comcast Xfinity X1, Xfinity Flex and YouTube TV.

Films and episodic titles available on the Fandor service include independent films, festival favorites, documentaries, international films and classics from a variety of time periods, including silent films and modern-day festival films and independent titles.

== The Fandor Festival Podcast ==
The Fandor Festival Podcast is a podcast dedicated to independent filmmakers, film festivals and the exploration of cinema. It is available through Spotify, Apple Podcasts, YouTube and across multiple major podcast platforms. The podcast features veteran morning radio personality and producer Hooman Khalili, former Fandor executive Chris Kelly and executive producer Bryn Nguyen.

The podcast releases weekly episodes composed of interviews, such as those with RogerEbert.com CEO Chaz Ebert, Noir Alley host Eddie Muller, Elvira, filmmaker Camille Griffin, University of Michigan head football coach Jim Harbaugh and celebrity chef Tyler Florence.

== See also ==
- Cinedigm
- The Film Detective
