= The Film Detective =

- Country: United States
- Broadcast area: Worldwide
- Headquarters: Rockport, Massachusetts

Programming
- Language: English

Ownership
- Owner: Cineverse
- Key people: Philip Hopkins (President, Founder)

History
- Launched: 2013; 13 years ago

Links
- Website: thefilmdetective.com

Availability

Streaming media
- The Film Detective: thefilmdetective.tv
- The Film Detective 24/7 App: iOS, Android, Amazon Fire TV, Roku, Apple TV
- The Film Detective 24/7 Classic Film & Television Channel: Sling TV, Plex, Stirr, DistroTV, Local Now, Rakuten TV, Rakuten TV, LG

The Film Detective is an American classic film restoration, distribution, and streaming company based in Rockport, Massachusetts, and is a division of the American entertainment company, Cineverse. Launched in 2013, The Film Detective offers an extensive library of over 3,000+ hours of classic films and television series, with a focus on both renowned classics and B-movies across genres including comedy, drama, film noir, horror, musical, mystery, science fiction, and silent. Services offered by The Film Detective include a classic film and television app on web, iOS, Android, Roku, Amazon Fire TV and Apple TV; a 24/7 linear channel offered across multiple leading OTT platforms including Sling TV, Plex, STIRR, DistroTV, Local Now, and Rakuten TV; and exclusive, limited-run Blu-ray and DVD releases.

== History ==
The Film Detective was launched in 2013 by founder Phil Hopkins, film archivist and producer, and previous co-founder of Marengo Films, Dogtown Productions, Inc., and Film Chest. In 2016, The Film Detective launched its classic film and television app on Roku, Amazon Fire TV, and Apple TV, featuring iconic titles, including rare silent films, westerns, film noir, musicals and comedies.

The Film Detective's 24/7 classic film and television channel joined Sling TV's free, live and VOD offerings in 2018, followed by DistroTV and STIRR in 2019; Plex and Glewed TV in 2020; and Local Now, RakutenTV, TCL, LG (US), and Kapang in 2021. In May 2020, The Film Detective announced the launch of its Android app, bringing over four thousand hours of classic film and television to Android users.

The Film Detective features the voice of Dana Hersey, former host of The Movie Loft and legendary broadcast host.

In 2020, an American entertainment company, Cinedigm (which later rebranded as Cineverse) acquired The Film Detective.

In November 2021, The Film Detective launched its first classic film and television app, hosted by classic radio expert Carl Amari. In 2021, The Film Detective announced it would release an original series, Classic Films for Kids, hosted by author Jennifer Churchill and her sidekick Weston.

== Services ==
The Film Detective offers an extensive library of over 4,000+ hours of classic films and television series, with a focus on both renowned classics and B-movies across genres including comedy, drama, film noir, horror, musical, mystery, science fiction, and silent.

The Film Detective is available through The Film Detective classic film and television app, The Film Detective 24/7 linear channel available across multiple leading OTT platforms including Sling TV and Plex, and The Film Detective's special edition Blu-ray and DVD releases. The Film Detective's classic film restorations are also featured on leading broadcast channels and platforms such as Turner Classic Movies.

Programming on The Film Detective 24/7 classic film and television channel features daily curation of horror films, daytime TV, classic comedies and musicals, westerns and adventures, and drama, mystery, and film noir titles. The Film Detective channel offers monthly thematic promotions and weekly features, including Saturday morning cartoons like Superman, Popeye, and Betty Boop; Sunday Serials like The Perils of Pauline and Flash Gordon; and late night weekday TV including The Carol Burnett Show and The Johnny Carson Show. The 24/7 channel is similar in format and programming to 1980's Nostalgia Channel.

In 2020, The Film Detective launched its first content-specific channel, The Lone Star Channel, featuring classic western films and television. The Lone Star Channel is available on Sling TV, DistroTV, Rakuten TV, and Local Now. The channel offers B-westerns, classic western television including Bonanza, The Lone Ranger, and The Roy Rogers Show, singing cowboys like Gene Autry, Tex Ritter, and Roy Rogers, and an evening Dinner with the Duke programming hour featuring John Wayne.

== The Film Detective App ==
Launched in 2016, The Film Detective app is available on web, iOS, Android, Roku, Apple TV, and Amazon Fire TV. The Film Detective app offers restored classics from fan favorites like Charade, His Girl Friday, The Phantom of the Opera, Royal Wedding, Two Women, Sounder, Kansas City Confidential, and House on Haunted Hill. The Film Detective app also features collections of B-movies, drive-in favorites, and underrepresented favorites including The Giant Gila Monster, Creature from the Haunted Sea, A Bucket of Blood, and more.

The Film Detective app also features over 40 television series including You Bet Your Life, Life with Elizabeth, The Lucy Show, Dragnet, The Carol Burnett Show, The Beverly Hillbillies, and Bonanza. Partner films and series available on The Film Detective app include Shout! Factory, Something Weird Video, Trailers from Hell, the British Film Institute, VCI Entertainment, Independent International Pictures, and C3 Entertainment. The Film Detective app showcases original content, often narrated by The Movie Loft host and broadcast legend Dana Hersey, including tributes, documentaries, and film introductions.

== The Film Detective Podcast ==
In October 2021, The Film Detective announced the launch of The Film Detective Podcast, the company's inaugural classic podcast. The Film Detective Podcast is dedicated to classic radio programs from the Golden Age of Radio, hosted by Carl Amari, film producer, syndicated radio host and a foremost authority on the golden age of radio. Through his company, Gulfstream Studios, Amari has spent decades licensing the rights to more than 50,000 hours of original radio programming. Amari has brought radio expertise as producer of multiple award-winning shows, including serving as creator/producer of The Twilight Zone Radio Dramas and producer/host of Hollywood 360.

The Film Detective Podcast rediscovers full classic radio programs including mystery and detective shows like The New Adventures of Sherlock Holmes, The Adventures of the Thin Man, Dragnet, and The Adventures of Sam Spade, Detective; comedies including The Burns & Allen Show, Father Knows Best, and The Jack Benny Program; science fiction and suspense including X Minus One and Suspense; and westerns like Have Gun – Will Travel, Gunsmoke, and The Roy Rogers Show. The Film Detective Podcast is available via Spotify, Apple Podcasts, YouTube, Audacy, Stitcher, etc.

== Restorations ==
The Film Detective releases hundreds of restored classic films on Blu-ray and DVD on Amazon, Allied Vaughn, and MVD, including Crackdown Big City Blues.

The Film Detective also offers special edition Blu-ray and DVD releases, often featuring collections of bonus features in collaboration with Ballyhoo Motion Pictures, ranging from film noir, to musical, and cult classic titles.

Release year	Film year	Film title	Special Features
2022	1966	Girl on a Chain Gang	Full length audio commentary / New, original essay, in a full color booklet / Featurette from Ballyhoo Motion Pictures
2022	1957	Monster from Green Hell	Missouri Born: The Films of Jim Davis, an all-new career retrospective with author/film historian, C. Courtney Joyner / The Men Behind the Monsters, an essay by author Don Stradley featured in a full color booklet / Commentary with artist/author, Stephen R. Bissette / Includes both widescreen (1.85:1) and full frame (1.33:1) versions of film
2022	1936	Dancing Pirate	Audio commentary and original insert essay from author Jennifer Churchill / Glorious Pioneers: The Birth of Technicolor, an interview with author/historian, David Pierce / Ambushed By Mediocrity: Remembering The Dancing Pirate, an interview with film producer/historian, Michael Schlesinger.
2022	1950	The Capture	Audio commentary with author/screenwriter C. Courtney Joyner / Teresa Wright: The Actress Next Door, Brand New Featurette / John Sturges: Man of Action, Brand New Featurette Not Quite Picture Perfect, an essay by author Don Stradley
2021	1930s	The Sherlock Holmes Vault Collection	Disc 1: The Fatal Hour (1931) featuring Arthur Wontner / Essay by Don Stradley / Commentary Track with Jennifer Churchill / The Adventures of Sam Sherman: Part One featurette / Recreated Sherlock Holmes Radio Broadcast / A Black Sherlock Holmes (1918) cut bonus short / A Black Sherlock Holmes (1918) uncut bonus short / Baffled (1900); Disc 2: The Triumph of Sherlock Holmes (1935) featuring Arthur Wontner / Essay by Jason A. Ney / Commentary Track w/ Jason A. Ney / The Adventures of Sam Sherman: Part Two featurette / The Copper Beeches (1912) / Blind Man's Bluff, TV episode (1954); Disc 3: Silver Blaze (1937) featuring Arthur Wontner / Essay by Don Stradley / Commentary Track w/ Phoef Sutton & Jordan Legan / The Adventures of Sam Sherman: Part Three featurette / Sure Luck Holmes, Felix the Cat cartoon / Cousins of Sherlocko (1913); Disc 4: A Study in Scarlet (1933) featuring Reginald Owen / Essay by C. Courtney Joyner / Commentary Track w/ Peter Atkins & David Breckman / Elementary Cinema, an original production by Ballyhoo Motion Pictures / Slick Sleuths, Mutt & Jeff cartoon
2021	1947	The Fabulous Dorseys	Original Essay by Don Stradley, 'The Dorseys in Film' / Full Commentary track by author, Jennifer Churchill / 'The Fabulous Forties: Big Bands on Screen,' an original production by Ballyhoo Motion Pictures
2021	1958	Frankenstein's Daughter	Full Commentary track / Full Color Booklet with original essay / Original featurettes from Ballyhoo Motion Picture Production
2021	1948	The Amazing Mr. X	Commentary by Professor and Film Scholar, Jason A. Ney / Full Color Booklet with essay, 'The Amazing Mr. Bey,' by Don Stradley / An original Ballyhoo Motion Picture Production
2021	1955	A Life at Stake	Commentary by Professor and Film Scholar, Jason A. Ney / Full Color Booklet with essay by Professor and Film Scholar, Jason A. Ney / 'HOLLYWOOD HITCH-HIKERS: INSIDE THE FILMAKERS' an original Ballyhoo Motion Picture Production
2021	1951	Flight to Mars	Audio Commentary by author/film historian Justin Humphreys / Walter Mirisch: From Bomba to Body Snatchers - A new documentary short from Ballyhoo Motion Pictures / Interstellar Travelogues: Cinema's First Space Race - A new documentary short with celebrated science fiction artist/historian Vincent Di Fate from Ballyhoo Motion Pictures / Full color insert booklet with an essay by Don Stradley
2021	1963	Hercules and the Captive Women	Full Feature, Mystery Science Theater 3000 (MST3K): Hercules and the Captive Women / All new documentary: Swords and Sandals / Audio Commentary by film critic, Tim Lucas / Full color insert booklet with essay on film
2021	1958	Giant from the Unknown	Audio Commentary with Author/ Historian Tom Weaver and Guests / Audio Commentary with co-star Gary Crutcher / 'YOU'RE A B-MOVIE STAR, CHARLIE BROWN' - An all-new interview actor/screenwriter Gary Crutcher / 'THE MAN WITH A BADGE: BOB STEELE IN THE 1950'S' - An all-new interview with author/film historian C. Courtney Joyner / All New Trailer
2020	1933	The Sin of Nora Moran	Limited edition Blu-ray and DVD of The Sin of Nora Moran: A stunning 4K restoration from the original 35mm camera negative, original documentary on Zita Johann from Daniel Griffith at Ballyhoo Motion Pictures and a Blu-ray exclusive collect
2020	1971	The Other Side of Madness	Original theatrical trailer (Helter Skelter Murders) / Original theatrical trailer (Original release) / Included Musical CD with songs written and performed by Charles Manson / Essay by Alexander Tuschinski exploring the nuances of the film, with film history / The Other Side of Manson: An Interview with Producer Wade Williams
2020	1980	Fist of Fear, Touch of Death	Fist of Fear, Touch of Death producer Terry Levene, director Matthew Mallinson, and scriptwriter Ron Harvey give their behind-the-camera take on the film in brand new interviews, featurette by Daniel Griffith from Ballyhoo Motion Pictures.
2019	1962	Eegah	Mystery Science Theater 3000 Version (1993), an interview with star Arch Hall Jr., An interview with Mystery Science Theater 3000 creator Joel Hodgson.

== See also ==
- Turner Classic Movies
- Movies!
- Family Movie Classics
- Nostalgia Channel
