= CONtv =

American streaming service

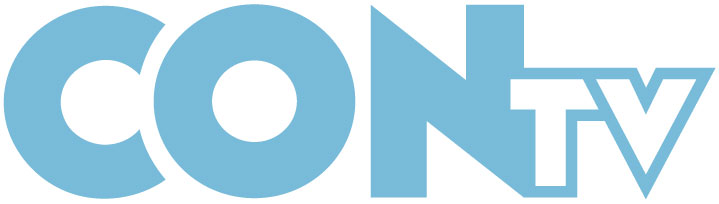
- Type: Subsidiary
- Industry: Entertainment
- Founded: March 2015
- Headquarters: Los Angeles, California, U.S.
- Area served: United States of America
- Services: Digital Streaming
- Owner: Cineverse
- Number of employees: 20

CONtv is an American streaming brand owned by Cineverse.

== History ==
Cineverse (then known as Cinedigm) and Wizard World (now known as Wizard Entertainment) launched an over-the-top streaming service called CONtv in March 2015. CONtv was catered towards fans of geek and nerd culture, featuring cult classic films and television series, digital comics, and behind-the-scenes content from Wizard World's Comic Cons..

In November 2017, Cinedigm announced the launch of CONtv's 24/7 "Always On" channel on Amazon-owned livestreaming platform Twitch.

On February 5, 2019, Viewster was acquired by Cinedigm and, on June 13, 2020, would merge with CONtv.

=== Merger with Midnight Pulp ===
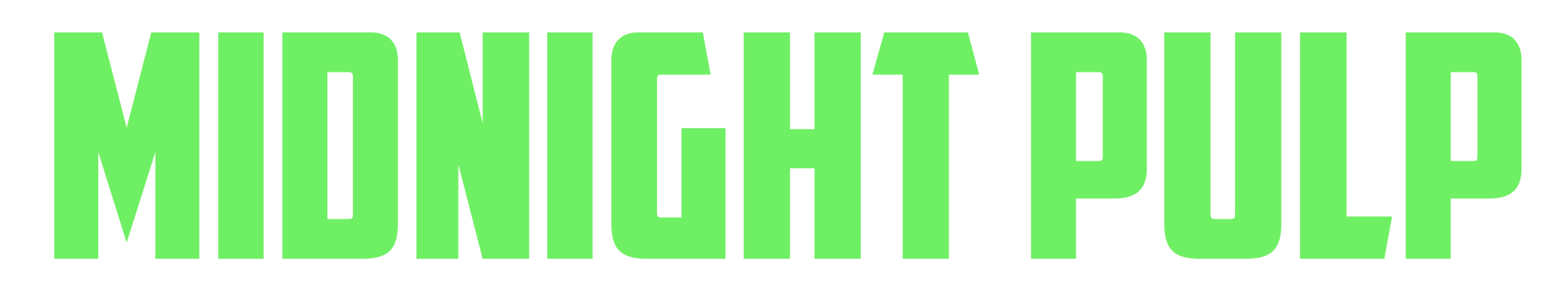
Midnight Pulp Logo used since 2023

In March 2022, Digital Media Rights (DMR), owners of RetroCrush and other streaming brands, was acquired by Cinedigm. Years prior, DMR launched Midnight Pulp in December 2014. Midnight Pulp's content is curated around "strange" cult and Grindhouse films.

On February 12, 2024, an e-mail was sent to followers notifying them that CONtv would rebrand as Midnight Pulp on March 1, 2024.

As of 2026, the CONtv name remains in-use for its Twitch and YouTube channels.

== CONtv Original Programming ==
- Fight of the Living Dead - Following digital celebrities as they fight to survive a "real-world" Zombie Apocalypse.
- Last Fan Standing, a game show hosted by Bruce Campbell.
- My Morphing Life - a reality series following Jason David Frank through his many convention experiences.
- Mythica: A Quest for Heroes - An original feature starring Kevin Sorbo of Hercules: The Legendary Journeys fame.

== Availability ==
The service was available across several devices, including Roku, Apple iOS, Android, Xbox, and smart TVs.
