= Bela Lugosi =

Hungarian actor (1882–1956)

Béla Lugosi
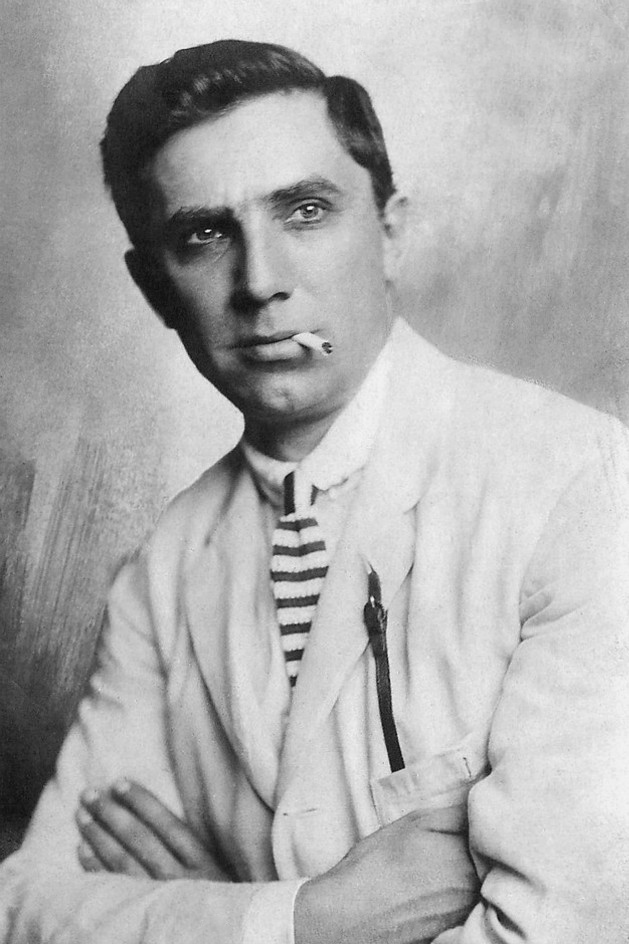
- Lugosi c. 1912
- Born: Béla Ferenc Dezső Blaskó; October 20, 1882; Lugos, Kingdom of Hungary, Austria-Hungary
- Died: August 16, 1956 (aged 73); Los Angeles, California, U.S.
- Resting place: Holy Cross Cemetery
- Other name: Arisztid Olt
- Occupation: Actor
- Years active: 1902–1956
- Spouses: Ilona Szmick (m. 1917; div. 1920); Ilona von Montagh (m. 1921; div. 1925); Beatrice Woodruff Weeks (m. 1929; div. 1929); Lillian Arch (m. 1933; div. 1953); Hope Lininger (m. 1955)
- Children: Béla George Lugosi
- Military career
- Allegiance: Austria-Hungary
- Branch: Austro-Hungarian Army
- Service years: 1914–1916
- Rank: Korporal
- Unit: 43rd Royal Hungarian Infantry
- Conflicts: World War I; Eastern Front; Carpathian Campaign
- Awards: Wound Medal
- Website: belalugosi.com

Béla Ferenc Dezső Blaskó (Note: Hungarian pronunciation: [ˈbeːlɒ ˈfɛrɛnt͡s ˈdɛʒøː ˈblɒʃkoː]) (October 20, 1882 – August 16, 1956), better known by his stage name Béla Lugosi, (Note: /ləˈɡoʊsi/, lə-GOH-she; Hungarian: [ˈluɡoʃi]) was a Hungarian–American actor. He is best remembered for portraying Count Dracula in the horror film classic Dracula (1931), Ygor in both Son of Frankenstein (1939) and Ghost of Frankenstein (1942) and his roles in many other horror films from 1931 through 1956.

Lugosi began acting on the Hungarian stage in 1901, appearing in more than 170 productions. Beginning in 1917, he performed in Hungarian silent films. During World War I, he served as a corporal (in Austrian German: Zugsführer; in Hungarian: szakaszvezető) in the Austro-Hungarian Army from 1914 to 1916. After the failed Hungarian Communist Revolution of 1919, Lugosi chose to immigrate to Germany due to his Socialist party activities. He acted in several films in Weimar Germany, before arriving in New Orleans as a seaman on a merchant ship, then making his way north to New York City and Ellis Island.

In 1927, he starred as Dracula in a Broadway adaptation of Bram Stoker's novel, moving with the play to the West Coast in 1928 and settling down in Hollywood. He later starred in the 1931 film version of Dracula directed by Tod Browning and produced by Universal Pictures. Through the 1930s, he occupied an important niche in horror films, but his notoriety as Dracula and thick Hungarian accent greatly limited the roles offered to him, and he unsuccessfully tried for years to avoid typecasting.

He co-starred in a number of films with fellow horror icon Boris Karloff, including The Black Cat (1934), The Raven (1935), and Son of Frankenstein (1939).

By this time, Lugosi had been receiving regular medication for sciatic neuritis, and he became addicted to doctor-prescribed morphine and methadone. This drug dependence (and his gradually worsening alcoholism) was becoming apparent to producers, and after 1948's Abbott and Costello Meet Frankenstein, Lugosi experienced a career decline and mostly appeared in low-budget films, some of which were directed by Ed Wood. His collaborations with Wood include a brief appearance in Plan 9 from Outer Space, released posthumously in 1957.

Lugosi married five times and had one son, Béla G. Lugosi (with his fourth wife, Lillian). Lugosi would eventually have four grandchildren and seven great-grandchildren, although he did not live long enough to meet any of them.

== Early life ==
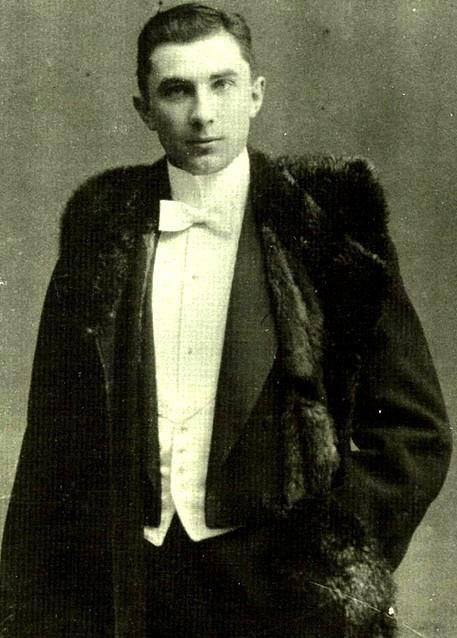
Lugosi at age 18

Lugosi, the youngest of five children (one of them died in an early age), was born Béla Ferenc Dezső Blaskó in 1882 in Lugos, Kingdom of Hungary (now Lugoj, Romania) to Hungarian father István Blaskó, a baker who later became a banker, and Serbian mother Paula de Vojnić (Serbian: Паула де Војнић). He was raised in a Catholic family.

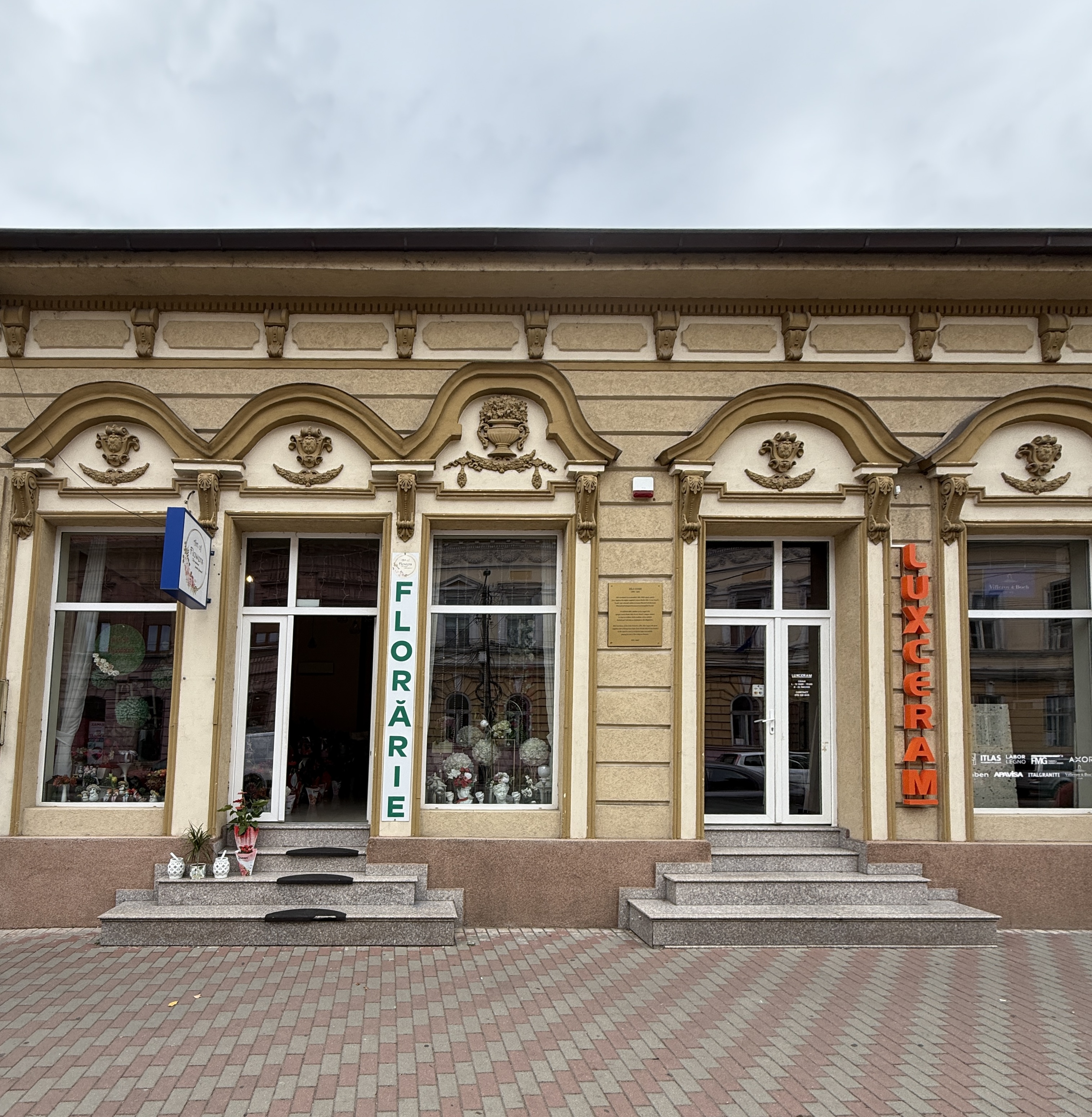
The house in Lugoj where Béla Lugosi was born, located on Bucegi Street, no. 6

Later in life, Lugosi spread a rumor that at the age of 12 – following the death of his father in 1894 – he dropped out of school and left home to work a succession of manual labor jobs. This is most likely not true; even if he did leave home, he surely returned soon afterward. The evidence indicates that he attended school until he had almost reached the age of 14, and moved to Subotica with his mother and sister in 1898. He began his stage acting career in Subotica in 1901. His earliest provable performances are from provincial theatres in spring 1902, playing small roles in several plays and operettas. He took the last name "Lugosi" in 1902 to honor his birthplace (until 1911, the name was mostly spelled Lugosy, sometimes Lugosi, and more rarely Lugossy), and went on to perform in, among others, Shakespearean plays. After moving to Budapest in 1911, he played dozens of roles with the National Theatre of Hungary between 1913 and 1919. Although Lugosi would later claim that he "became the leading actor of Hungary's Royal National Theatre", most of his roles there were small or supporting parts, which led him to enter the Hungarian film industry.

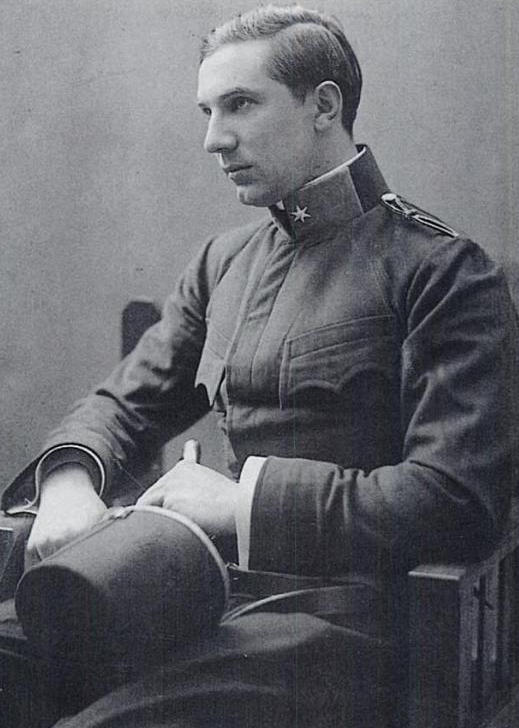
It is often mistakenly claimed that this photograph was taken during World War I; in fact, it was taken during a play (circa 1913)

During World War I, he served in the Austro-Hungarian Army Imperial and Royal 43rd Infantry Regiment from 1914 to 1916, with the rank of a corporal (in Austrian German: Zugsführer; in Hungarian: szakaszvezető). He was probably awarded the Wound Medal for wounds he sustained while serving on the Russian front. Returning to civilian life, Lugosi became an actor in Hungarian silent films, appearing in many of them under the stage name "Arisztid Olt".

Due to his activism in the actors' union in Hungary during the revolution of 1919 and his active participation in the Hungarian Soviet Republic, he left his homeland when the government changed hands, initially accompanied by his first wife Ilona Szmik. They escaped to Vienna before settling in Berlin (in the Langestrasse), where he began acting in German silent films. During these moves, Ilona lost her unborn child, after which she left Lugosi and returned home to her parents, where she filed for divorce and soon after remarried.

Lugosi eventually travelled to New Orleans, Louisiana, in December 1920 working as a crewman aboard a merchant ship, then made his way north to New York City, where he again took up acting in (and sometimes directing) stage plays in 1921–1922, then worked in the New York silent film industry from 1923 to 1926. In 1921, he met and married his second wife, Ilona von Montagh, a young Hungarian emigree and stage actress whom he had worked with years before in Europe. They only lived together for a few weeks, but their divorce was not finalized until October 1925.

He later moved to California in 1928 to tour in the Dracula stage play, and his Hollywood film career took off. Lugosi claimed he performed the Dracula play around 1,000 times during his lifetime. He eventually became a U.S. citizen in 1931, soon after the release of his film version of Dracula.

== Career ==
=== Early films ===
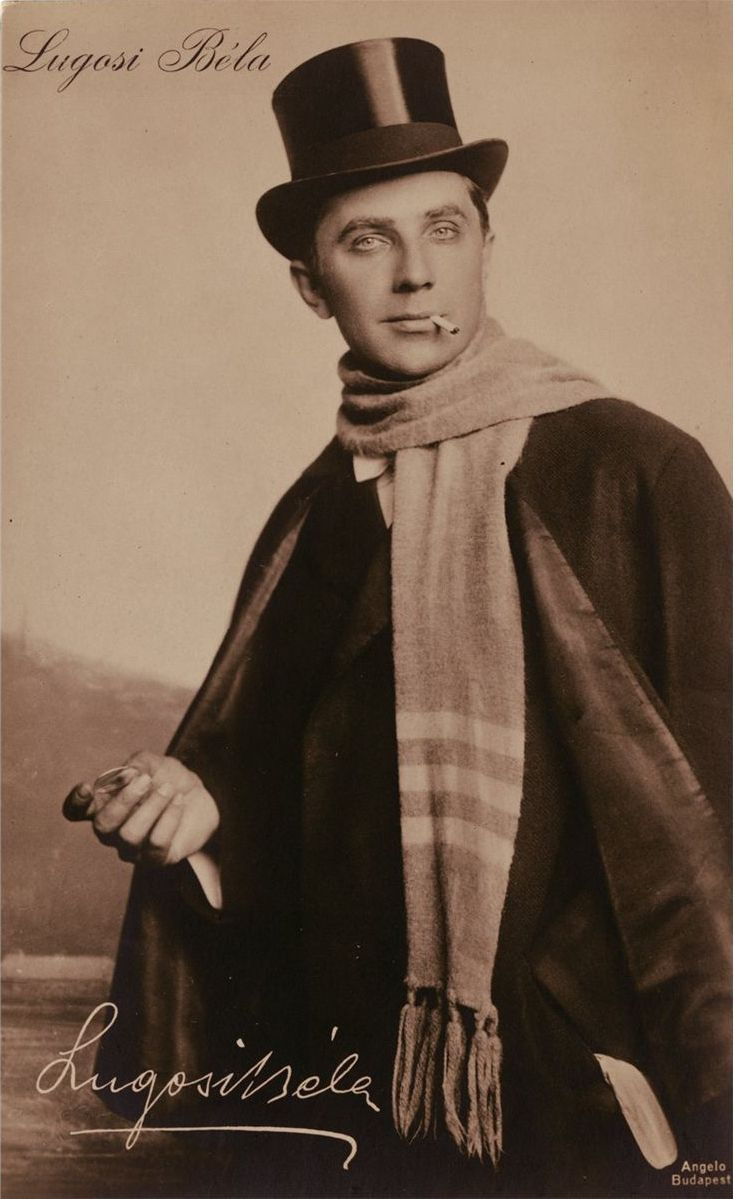
Béla Lugosi in 1920

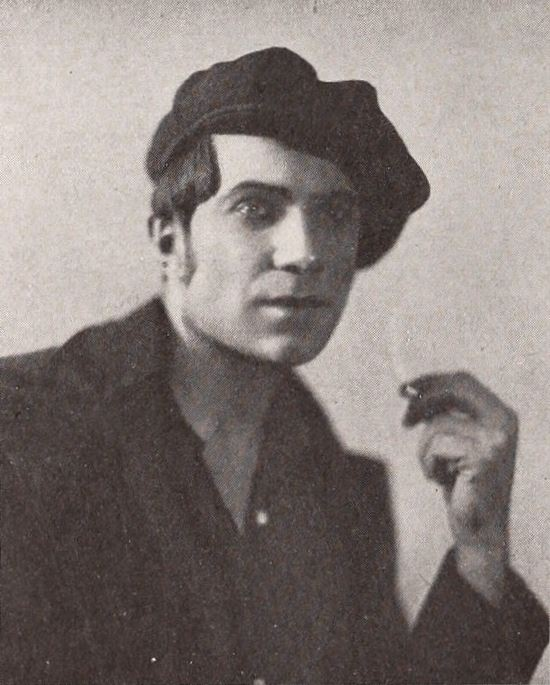
Lugosi in Shadowland Magazine, 1923

Lugosi's first film appearance was in the 1917 Hungarian silent film Az élet királya; the film's public screening took place on January 19, 1918. When appearing in Hungarian silent films, in the films made by Star filmstudio (and directed by Alfréd Deésy), he used the stage name Arisztid Olt. In his two films directed by Michael Curtiz, he used his stagename, Béla Lugosi. He made at least nine films in Hungary between 1917 and 1918 before leaving for Germany. Following the collapse of Béla Kun's Hungarian Soviet Republic in 1919, leftists and trade unionists became vulnerable, some being imprisoned or executed in public. Lugosi was proscribed from acting due to his participation in the formation of an actors' union. Exiled in Weimar-era Germany, he co-starred in at least 14 German silent films in 1920, among them Hypnose: Sklaven fremden Willens (1920), Der Januskopf (1920), and an adaptation of the Karl May novel Caravan of Death (1920).

In October 1920, Lugosi left Germany for the United States and entered the country at New Orleans in December. He made his way to New York and was inspected by immigration officers at Ellis Island in March 1921. He declared his intention to become a US citizen in 1928; on June 26, 1931, he was naturalized.

On his arrival in America, the 6-foot-1-inch (1.85 m), 180-pound (82 kg) Lugosi worked for some time as a laborer, and then entered the theater in New York City's Hungarian immigrant colony. With fellow expatriate Hungarian actors, he formed a small stock company that toured Eastern cities, playing for immigrant audiences. Lugosi acted in several Hungarian language plays before starring in his first English Broadway play, The Red Poppy in 1922. Three more parts came in 1925–26, including a five-month run in the comedy-fantasy The Devil in the Cheese. In 1925, he played an Arab sheik in Arabesque which premiered in Buffalo, New York at the Teck Theatre before moving to Broadway.

His first American film role was in the silent melodrama The Silent Command (1923), which was filmed in New York. Four other silent roles followed, villains and continental types, all in productions made in the New York area. A rumor circulated for decades among film historians that Lugosi played an uncredited bit part as a clown in the first film produced by Metro-Goldwyn-Mayer, He Who Gets Slapped (1924) starring Lon Chaney, but this has been heavily disputed. The rumor originated from the discovery of a publicity still from this film found posthumously in Lugosi's scrapbook, which showed an unidentified clown in heavy makeup standing near Lon Chaney in one scene. It was thought to be evidence that Lugosi appeared in the film, but historians agree that is very unlikely, as Lugosi was in Chicago (appearing in a play called The Werewolf) and New York at the time that film was in production in Hollywood.

=== Dracula ===
Lugosi as Dracula in a 1931 adaptation

Lugosi was approached in the summer of 1927 to star in a Broadway theatre production of Dracula, which had been adapted by Hamilton Deane and John L. Balderston from Bram Stoker's 1897 novel. The Horace Liveright production was successful, running in New York City for 261 performances before touring the United States to much fanfare and critical acclaim throughout 1928 and 1929. In 1928, Lugosi decided to stay in California when the play ended its first West Coast run. His performance had piqued the interest of Fox Film, and he was cast in the Hollywood studio's silent film The Veiled Woman (1929). He also appeared in the film Prisoners (also 1929), believed lost, which was released in both a silent and partial talkie version.

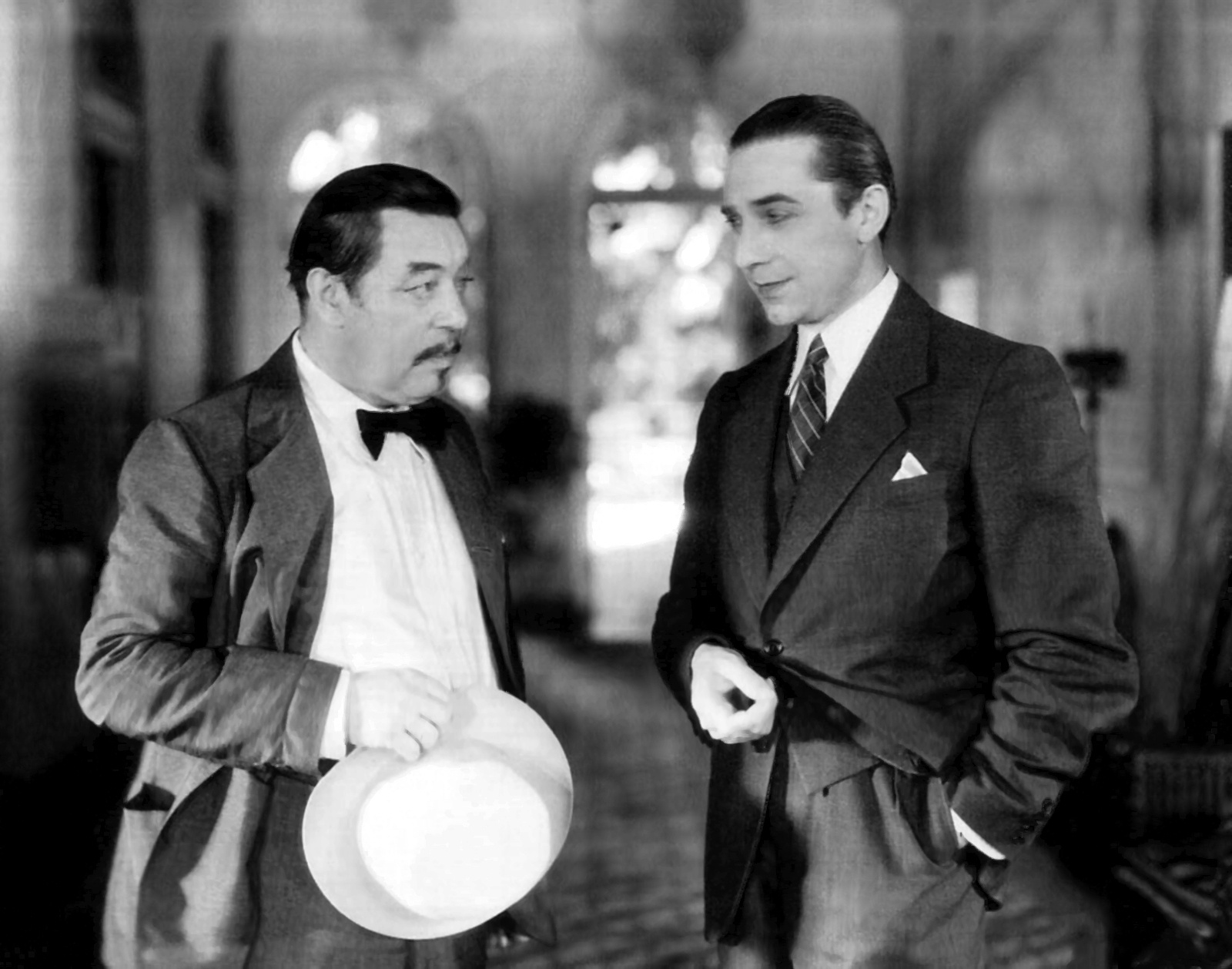
Lugosi as the psychic Tarneverro, with Warner Oland, in The Black Camel (1931)

In 1929, with no other film roles in sight, he returned to the stage as Dracula for a short West Coast tour of the play. Lugosi remained in California where he resumed his film work under contract with Fox, appearing in early talkies often as a heavy or an "exotic sheik". He also continued to lobby for his prized role in the film version of Dracula.

Despite his critically acclaimed performance on stage, Lugosi was not Universal Pictures' first choice for the role of Dracula when the company optioned the rights to the Deane play and began production in 1930. (Note: A persistent rumor asserts that director Tod Browning's long-time collaborator Lon Chaney was Universal's first choice for the role, and that Lugosi was chosen only due to Chaney's death from cancer shortly before production. While there is no question that Chaney would be anyone's first choice, Chaney had been under long-term contract to Metro-Goldwyn-Mayer since 1925, and had negotiated a lucrative new contract just before his death. Chaney and Browning had worked together on several projects (including four of Chaney's final five releases), but Browning was only a last-minute choice to direct the movie version of Dracula after the death of director Paul Leni, who had originally been slated to direct.) Different prominent actors, such as Paul Muni, Chester Morris, Ian Keith, John Wray, Joseph Schildkraut, Arthur Edmund Carewe, William Courtenay, John Carradine, and Conrad Veidt were considered. Lew Ayres was eventually hired to play Jonathan Harker, only to be replaced by Robert Ames after being cast in a different role in a different Universal Pictures film. Ames was in turn replaced with David Manners. Lugosi had played the role on Broadway, and was considered before director Tod Browning cast him in the role. To his good fortune, Lugosi happened to be in Los Angeles with a touring company of the play when the film was being cast. Against the tide of studio opinion, Lugosi lobbied hard and ultimately won the executives over, thanks in part to his acceptance of a "paltry" salary of $3,500 (equivalent to $67,000 in 2025) for seven weeks of work.

=== Typecasting ===
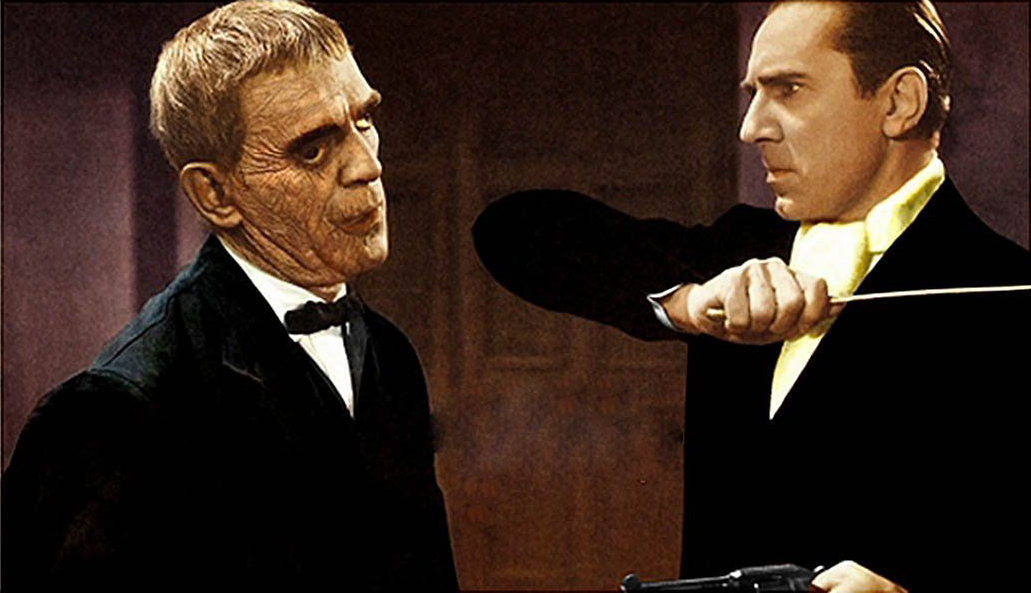
Boris Karloff and Béla Lugosi in The Raven (1935)

Through his association with Dracula (in which he appeared with minimal makeup, using his natural, heavily accented voice), Lugosi found himself typecast as a horror villain in films such as Murders in the Rue Morgue (1932), The Black Cat (1934) and The Raven (1935) for Universal, and the independent White Zombie (1932).

Lugosi auditioned for many roles in an attempt to break from typecasting. He lost out to Lionel Barrymore for the role of Grigori Rasputin in Rasputin and the Empress (also 1932); C. Henry Gordon for the role of Surat Khan in Charge of the Light Brigade (1936), and Basil Rathbone for the role of Commissar Dimitri Gorotchenko in Tovarich (1937), a role Lugosi had played on stage. He played the elegant, somewhat hot-tempered General Nicholas Strenovsky-Petronovich in International House (1933).

Regardless of controversy, five films at Universal — The Black Cat (1934), The Raven (1935), The Invisible Ray (1936), Son of Frankenstein (1939), Black Friday (1940), plus minor cameo performances in Gift of Gab (1934) and two at RKO Pictures, You'll Find Out (1940) and The Body Snatcher (1945) — paired Lugosi with Boris Karloff. Despite the relative size of their roles, Lugosi inevitably received second billing, below Karloff. There are contradictory reports of Lugosi's attitude toward Karloff, with some claiming that he was openly resentful of Karloff's long-term success and ability to gain good roles beyond the horror arena, while others indicated the two actors were amicable. In interviews, Karloff stated that Lugosi was initially mistrustful of him, but they were eventually able to work together amicably. Others have commented that Karloff's on-set demand to break from filming for mid-afternoon tea annoyed Lugosi. Lugosi played a few heroic leads, as in Universal's The Black Cat, The Invisible Ray, and a romantic role in producer Sol Lesser's adventure serial The Return of Chandu (1934), but his typecasting problem appears to have been too entrenched to be alleviated by those films.

Lugosi addressed his plea to be cast in non-horror roles directly to casting directors through his listing in the 1937 Players Directory, published by the Academy of Motion Picture Arts and Sciences. In it, he called it "an error" for directors to believe he was only suited for horror films.

=== Later career and decline ===
Lugosi developed severe, chronic sciatica, ostensibly aggravated by injuries received during his military service. He was initially treated with benign pain remedies such as asparagus juice, but was eventually prescribed opiates. His chronic pain and increased dependence on opiates, particularly morphine and methadone, led to the dwindling of Lugosi's screen offers. The problem first manifested itself in 1937, when Lugosi was forced to withdraw from a leading role in a serial production, The Secret of Treasure Island, due to constant back pain.

Historian John McElwee reports, in his 2013 book Showmen, Sell It Hot!, that Béla Lugosi's popularity received a much-needed boost in August 1938, when California theater owner Emil Umann revived Dracula and Frankenstein as a special double feature. The combination was so successful that Umann scheduled extra shows to accommodate the capacity crowds, and invited Lugosi to appear in person, which thrilled new audiences that had never seen Lugosi's classic performance. Lugosi later said of Umann, "I owe it all to that little man at the Regina Theatre. I was dead, and he brought me back to life." Universal took notice of the tremendous business and launched its own national re-release of the same two horror favorites. The studio then rehired Lugosi to star in new films, re-energizing his career just as his fourth wife had given birth to a son.

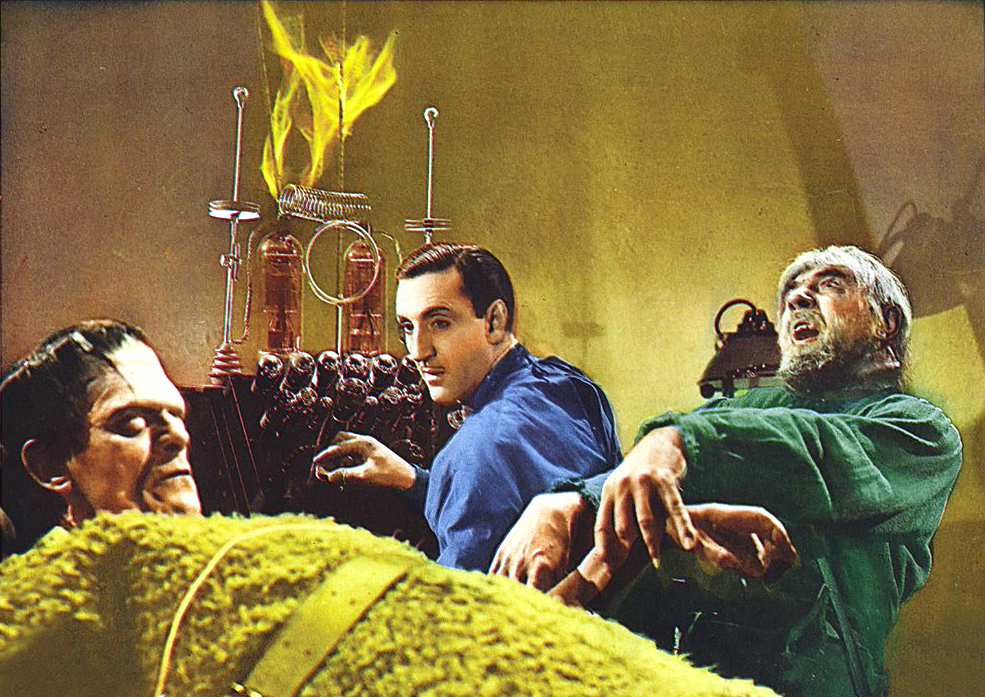
Boris Karloff as Frankenstein's monster, Basil Rathbone as Dr. Frankenstein's son, and Lugosi as Ygor in Son of Frankenstein (1939)

Universal cast Lugosi in Son of Frankenstein (1939), appearing in the character role of Ygor, a mad blacksmith with a broken neck, in heavy makeup and beard. Lugosi was third-billed with his name above the title alongside Basil Rathbone as Dr. Frankenstein's son and Boris Karloff reprising his role as Frankenstein's monster. Regarding Son of Frankenstein, the film's director Rowland V. Lee said his crew let Lugosi "work on the characterization; the interpretation he gave us was imaginative and totally unexpected ... when we finished shooting, there was no doubt in anyone's mind that he stole the show. Karloff's monster was weak by comparison."

Also in 1939, Lugosi made a rare appearance in an A-list motion picture as a stern Soviet commissar in the Metro-Goldwyn-Mayer romantic comedy Ninotchka, starring Greta Garbo and directed by Ernst Lubitsch. Lugosi was quite effective in this small but prestigious character part and he even received top billing among the film's supporting cast, all of whom had significantly larger roles. It could have been a turning point for the actor, but within the year he was back on Hollywood's Poverty Row, playing leads for Sam Katzman at Monogram Pictures. At Universal, Lugosi was usually cast for his name value; he often received star billing for what amounted to a supporting part.

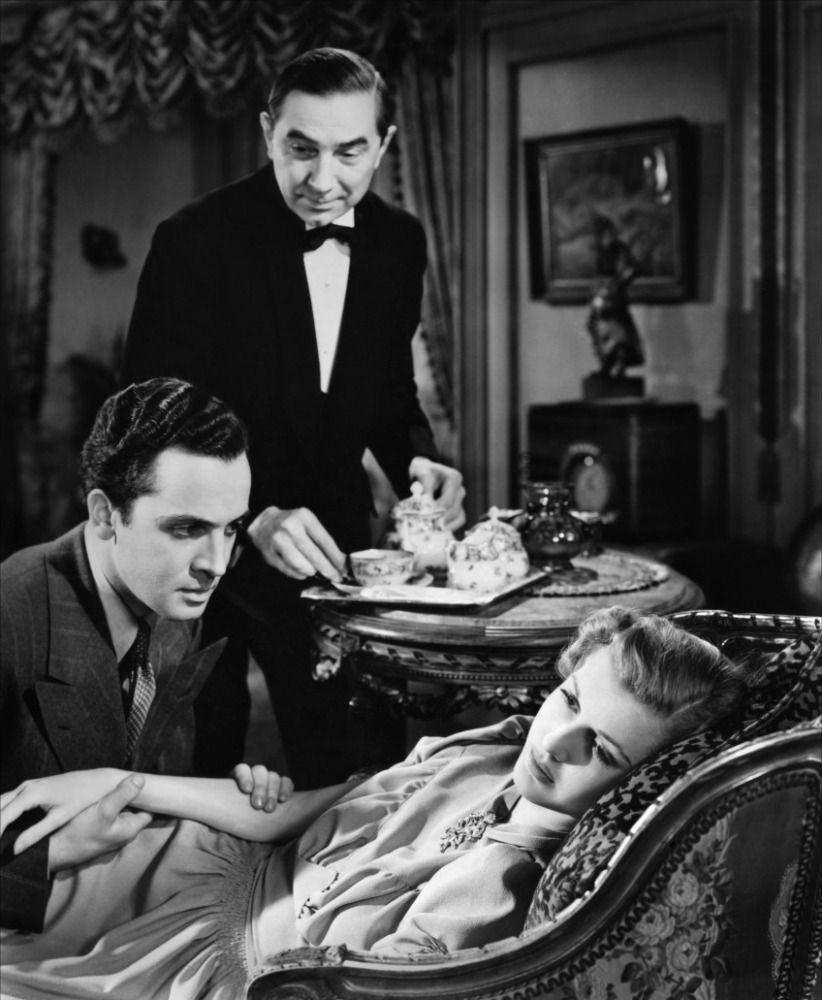
Lugosi as a butler in The Gorilla (1939)

Lugosi went to 20th Century-Fox for The Gorilla (1939), which had him playing straight man as a butler to Patsy Kelly and the Ritz Brothers. When Lugosi's Black Friday premiered in 1940 on a double bill with the Vincent Price film The House of the Seven Gables, Lugosi and Price both appeared in person at the Chicago Theatre where it opened on February 29, 1940, and remained for four performances. Lugosi was brought in by the Walt Disney Company to provide reference poses for Chernabog in the Night on Bald Mountain segment of the studio's third animated film, Fantasia (1940), but Disney animator Bill Tytla who animated the character disliked it and replaced Lugosi with the segments director Wilfred Jackson.

He was cast as Frankenstein's monster for Universal's Frankenstein Meets the Wolf Man (1943). At the end of the previous film in the series, The Ghost of Frankenstein (1942), Lugosi's voice had been dubbed over that of Lon Chaney Jr. since Ygor's brain was now in the Monster's skull. But at the last minute, Lugosi's heavily accented dialogue was edited out after the film was completed, along with the idea of the Monster being blind, leaving his performance featuring groping, outstretched arms and moving lips seeming enigmatic (and funny) to audiences.

Lugosi kept busy during the 1940s as a screen menace. In addition to his nine Monogram features, he worked in three features for RKO and one for Columbia (The Return of the Vampire, 1943). He also accepted the lead in an experimental and economical feature, Scared to Death, shot in the semi-professional 16mm film format and blown up to 35mm for theatrical release. The film was completed April 1946 and released June 1947. It is noteworthy as being Lugosi's only color film.

Lugosi played Dracula for a second and final time on film in Abbott and Costello Meet Frankenstein (1948), which was his last "A" movie. For the remainder of his life, he appeared in obscure, forgettable, low-budget B features. From 1947 to 1950, he performed in summer stock, often in productions of Dracula or Arsenic and Old Lace, and during the rest of the year, made personal appearances in a touring "spook show", and on early commercial television.

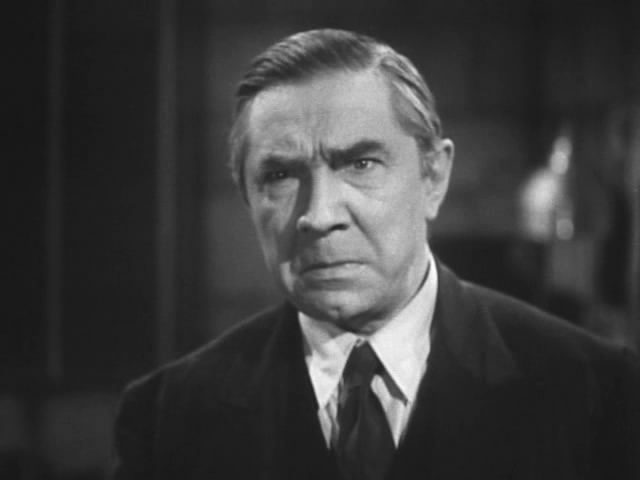
Lugosi in The Devil Bat (1940)

In September 1949, Milton Berle invited Lugosi to appear in a sketch on Texaco Star Theatre. Lugosi memorized the script for the skit, but became confused on the air when Berle began to ad lib. He also appeared on the anthology series Suspense on October 11, 1949, in a live adaptation of Edgar Allan Poe's "The Cask of Amontillado".

In 1951, while in England to play a six-month tour of Dracula, Lugosi co-starred in a lowbrow film comedy, Mother Riley Meets the Vampire (also known as Vampire Over London and My Son, the Vampire), released the following year. Following his return to the United States, he was interviewed for television, and reflected wistfully on his typecasting in horror parts: "Now I am the boogie man". In the same interview, he expressed a desire to play more comedy, as he had in the Mother Riley farce. Independent producer Jack Broder took Lugosi at his word, casting him in a jungle-themed comedy, Bela Lugosi Meets a Brooklyn Gorilla (1952), starring nightclub comedians Duke Mitchell and Jerry Lewis look-alike Sammy Petrillo, whose act closely resembled that of Dean Martin and Jerry Lewis (Martin and Lewis). Hal B. Wallis, Martin and Lewis's producer, unsuccessfully sued Broder.

=== Stage and personal appearances ===
Lugosi enjoyed a lively career on stage, with plenty of personal appearances. As film offers declined, he became increasingly dependent on live venues to support his family. Lugosi took over the role of Jonathan Brewster from Boris Karloff for Arsenic and Old Lace. Lugosi had also expressed interest in playing Elwood P. Dowd in Harvey. He made frequent personal live appearances to promote his horror image or accompanying films.

The Vincent Price film, House of Wax, premiered in Los Angeles at the Paramount Theatre on April 16, 1953. The film played at midnight with a number of celebrities in the audience that night (Judy Garland, Ginger Rogers, Rock Hudson, Broderick Crawford, Gracie Allen, Eddie Cantor, Shelley Winters, and others). Producer Alex Gordon, knowing Lugosi was in dire need of cash, arranged for the actor to stand outside the theater wearing a cape and dark glasses, holding a man costumed as a gorilla on a leash. He later allowed himself to be photographed drinking a glass of milk at a Red Cross booth there. When Lugosi playfully attempted to bite the "nurse" in attendance, she overreacted and spilled a glass of milk all over his shirt and cape. Afterward, Lugosi was interviewed by a reporter who botched the interview by asking the prearranged questions out of order, thoroughly confusing the aging star. Embarrassed, Lugosi left abruptly, without attending the screening.

=== Ed Wood and final projects ===
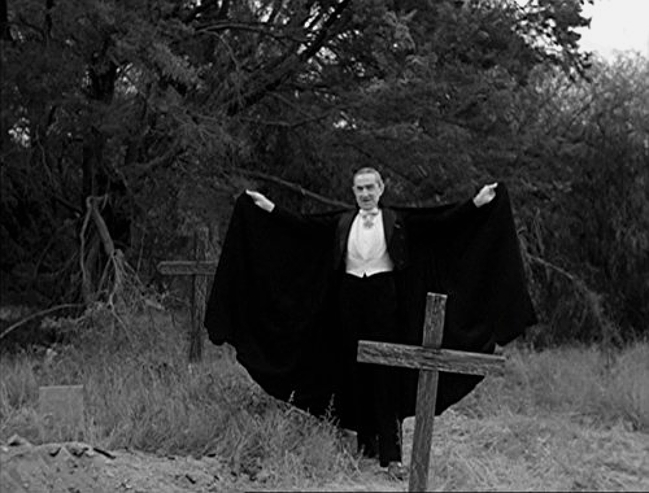
Lugosi in Ed Wood's Plan 9 from Outer Space (1959)

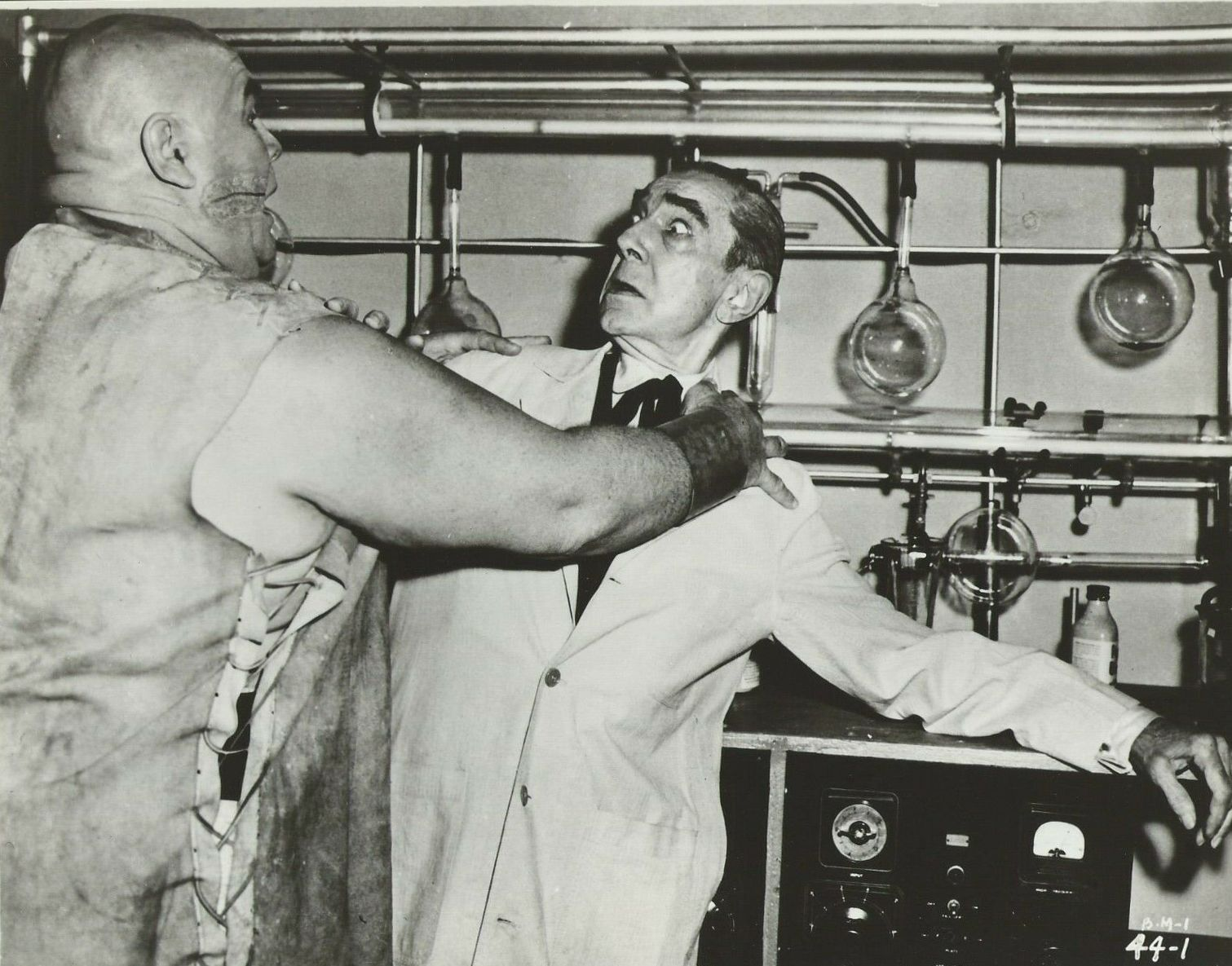
Tor Johnson and Lugosi in Bride of the Monster (1956)

Late in his life, Béla Lugosi again received star billing in films when the ambitious but financially limited filmmaker Ed Wood, a fan of Lugosi, found him living in obscurity and near-poverty and offered him roles in his films, such as an anonymous narrator in Glen or Glenda (1953) and a mad scientist in Bride of the Monster (1955). During post-production of the latter, Lugosi decided to seek treatment for his drug addiction, and the film's premiere was arranged to raise money for Lugosi's hospital expenses. However, the premiere raised a paltry amount of money. According to Kitty Kelley's biography of Frank Sinatra, when the entertainer heard of Lugosi's problems, he visited Lugosi at the hospital and gave him a $1,000 check. Sinatra later recalled Lugosi's amazement at his visit and generosity, since the two men had never met before.

During an impromptu interview upon his release from the drug treatment center in 1955, Lugosi stated that he was about to begin work on a new Ed Wood film called The Ghoul Goes West. This was one of several projects proposed by Wood, including The Phantom Ghoul and Dr. Acula. With Lugosi in his Dracula cape, Wood shot impromptu test footage with no particular storyline in mind, in front of Tor Johnson's home, at a suburban graveyard, and in front of Lugosi's apartment building on Carlton Way. This footage was used in Wood's Plan 9 from Outer Space (1957), which was filmed in 1956 shortly after Lugosi's death. Wood hired Tom Mason, his wife's chiropractor, to double for Lugosi in additional shots. Mason was noticeably taller and thinner than Lugosi, and had the lower half of his face covered with his cape in every shot, as Lugosi sometimes did in Abbott and Costello Meet Frankenstein.

Wood also had plans to build a horror film (to be called Ghouls of the Moon) around another reel of silent film footage that he had taken of Lugosi before he died in 1956, but nothing came of it since by 1958, Wood discovered the film in the can had degraded into an unusable sludge due to bad storage conditions.

Ed Wood and teen-aged Lugosi fan Richard Sheffield petitioned Universal Studios in 1953 to make a Color/ 3-D remake of the 1931 classic Dracula, starring Lugosi in the lead. Although they gathered hundreds of signatures, nothing came of their efforts.

Lugosi was initially considered for the role of the mad doctor in the 1954 horror-comedy The Bowery Boys Meet the Monsters, but he was replaced in the cast by John Dehner at the last minute.

In March 1954, Wood tried to interest a number of comic book publishers in a monthly Béla Lugosi title, to no avail. Among the companies he contacted were DC Comics, Dell, Fiction House, Ziff-Davis, Quality and Toby Press.

Following his treatment, Lugosi made one final film, in late 1955, The Black Sleep, for Bel-Air Pictures, which was released in the summer of 1956 through United Artists with a promotional campaign that included several personal appearances by Lugosi and his co-stars, as well as Maila Nurmi (TV's horror host "Vampira"). To Lugosi's disappointment, his role in this film was that of a mute butler with no dialogue. Lugosi was intoxicated and very ill during the film's promotional campaign and had to return to L.A. earlier than planned. He was never able to see the finished film. Tor Johnson said in interviews that Lugosi kept screaming that he wanted to die the night they shared a hotel room together.

In 1959, a British film called Lock Up Your Daughters, composed of clips from Lugosi's Monogram pictures from the 1940s, was theatrically released in the U.K. The film is considered lost, but a March 16, 1959, critical review in the Kinematograph Weekly mentioned that the movie contained new Lugosi footage, which intrigued historians, since Lugosi died in 1956. In 1950, Lugosi appeared on a one-hour TV program called Murder and Bela Lugosi (broadcast by WPIX-TV on September 18, 1950) in which he was interviewed and provided commentary on his horror films. Historian Gary Rhodes believes that footage from this program was used in the 1959 film.

== Personal life ==
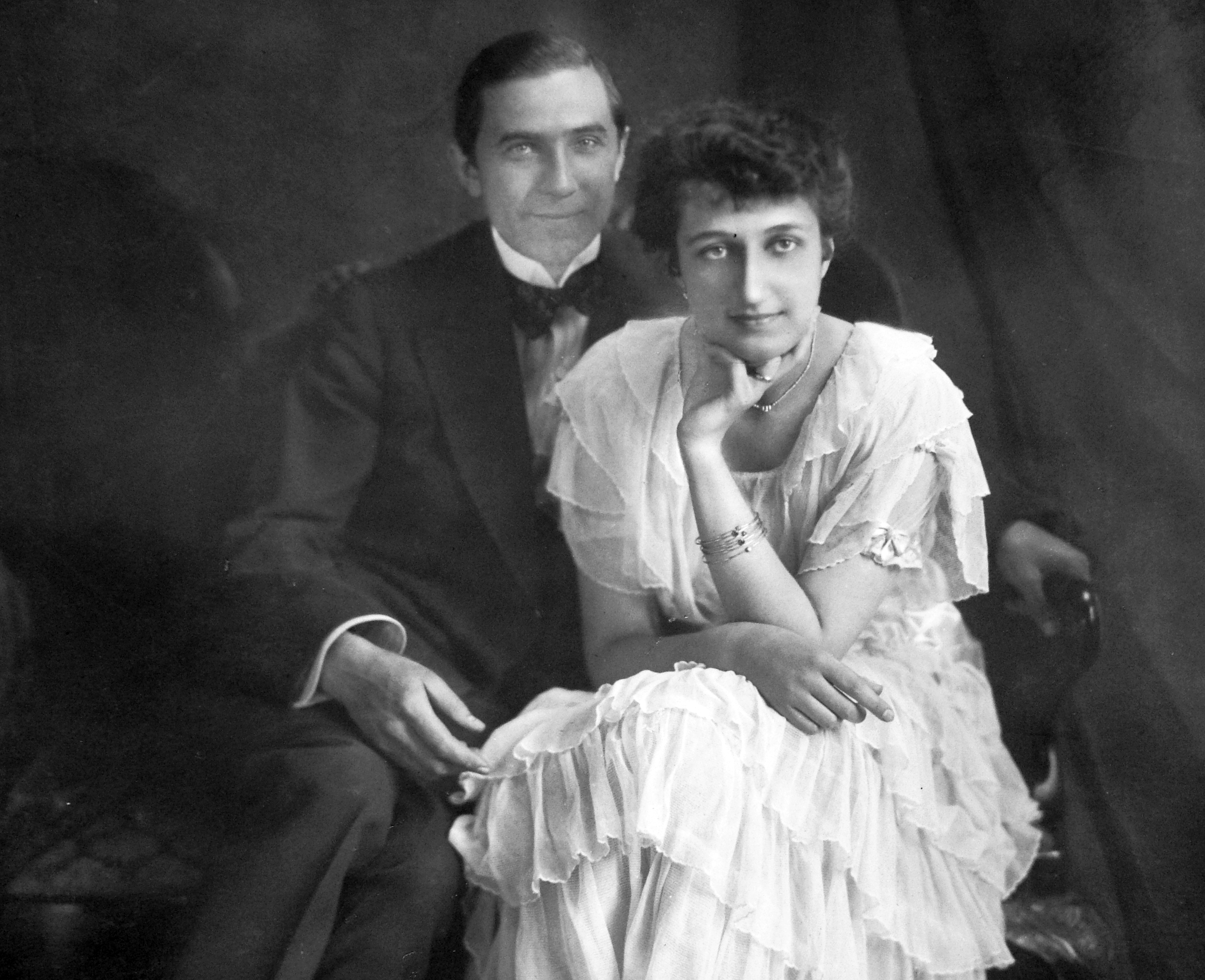
With first wife Ilona Szmik, 1917

Lugosi was married five times. In June 1917, Lugosi married 19-year-old Ilona Szmik (1898–1991) in Hungary. The couple divorced after Lugosi left his homeland and moved to Germany for political reasons. He risked accountability if he stayed, but Ilona did not wish to leave her parents. The divorce became final on July 17, 1920, and was uncontested as Lugosi could not appear for the proceedings. (Szmik then married wealthy Hungarian architect Imre Francsek in December 1920, moved with him to Iran in 1930, had two children, and died in 1991.)

After living briefly in Germany, Lugosi left Europe by ship and arrived in New Orleans on December 4, 1920. He underwent his primary alien inspection at Ellis Island, N.Y. on March 23, 1921.

In September 1921, he married Hungarian actress Ilona von Montagh in New York City. She filed for divorce on November 11, 1924, charging him with adultery and complaining that he wanted her to abandon her acting career to keep house for him. The divorce was finalized in October 1925. In 1935, Lugosi learned that von Montagh and a female friend had been arrested for shoplifting in New York City, which was the last he heard of her.

Lugosi took his place in Hollywood society and scandal when he married wealthy San Francisco resident Beatrice Woodruff Weeks (1897–1931), widow of architect Charles Peter Weeks, on July 27, 1929, in Redwood City, California. Weeks subsequently filed for divorce on November 4, 1929, accusing Lugosi of infidelity, citing actress Clara Bow as the "other woman", and claiming Lugosi tried to take her checkbook and the key to her safe deposit box away from her. Lugosi complained of her excessive drinking and dancing with other men at social gatherings. The divorce became official on December 9, 1929. 17 months later, Weeks died at age 34 from alcoholism in Panama, with Lugosi not receiving any money from her estate.

On June 26, 1931, Lugosi became a naturalized United States citizen.

In 1933, the 51-year-old Lugosi married 22-year-old Lillian Arch (1911–1981), the daughter of Hungarian immigrants living in Hollywood. Lillian's father was against her marriage to Lugosi, as the actor was experiencing financial difficulties at the time. The couple eloped to Las Vegas in January 1933. They were married for 20 years and had a son, Béla G. Lugosi, in 1938. Lugosi eventually had four grandchildren (named Greg, Jeff, Tim, and Lynne) and seven great-grandchildren, although he did not live long enough to meet any of them.

Lugosi and his family vacationed on their lakeshore property in Lake Elsinore, California (then called Elsinore), on several lots between 1944 and 1953. Lillian's parents lived on one of their properties and Lugosi frequented the health spa there. Béla Lugosi Jr. was boarded at the Elsinore Naval and Military School in Lake Elsinore, and lived with Lillian's parents while she and Béla were touring.

After almost separating in 1944, Lillian and Béla divorced on July 17, 1953, at least partially because of Béla's excessive drinking and his jealousy over Lillian's decision to take a full-time job as an assistant to actor Brian Donlevy on Donlevy's radio and television series Dangerous Assignment. Lillian obtained custody of their son Béla Jr. One night after Lillian left him, Lugosi called the police and threatened to commit suicide. When the police showed up at his apartment, he denied making the call. Lillian married Brian Donlevy in 1966 (by which time he had also become an alcoholic) and she died in 1981.

In 1955, Lugosi married Hope Lininger, his fifth wife; she was 37 years his junior and had been a fan. While he was in the hospital for his drug addiction, she had written letters to him, which she would sign "A dash of Hope". Although they discussed divorce, they were married until Lugosi's death in 1956.

== Death ==
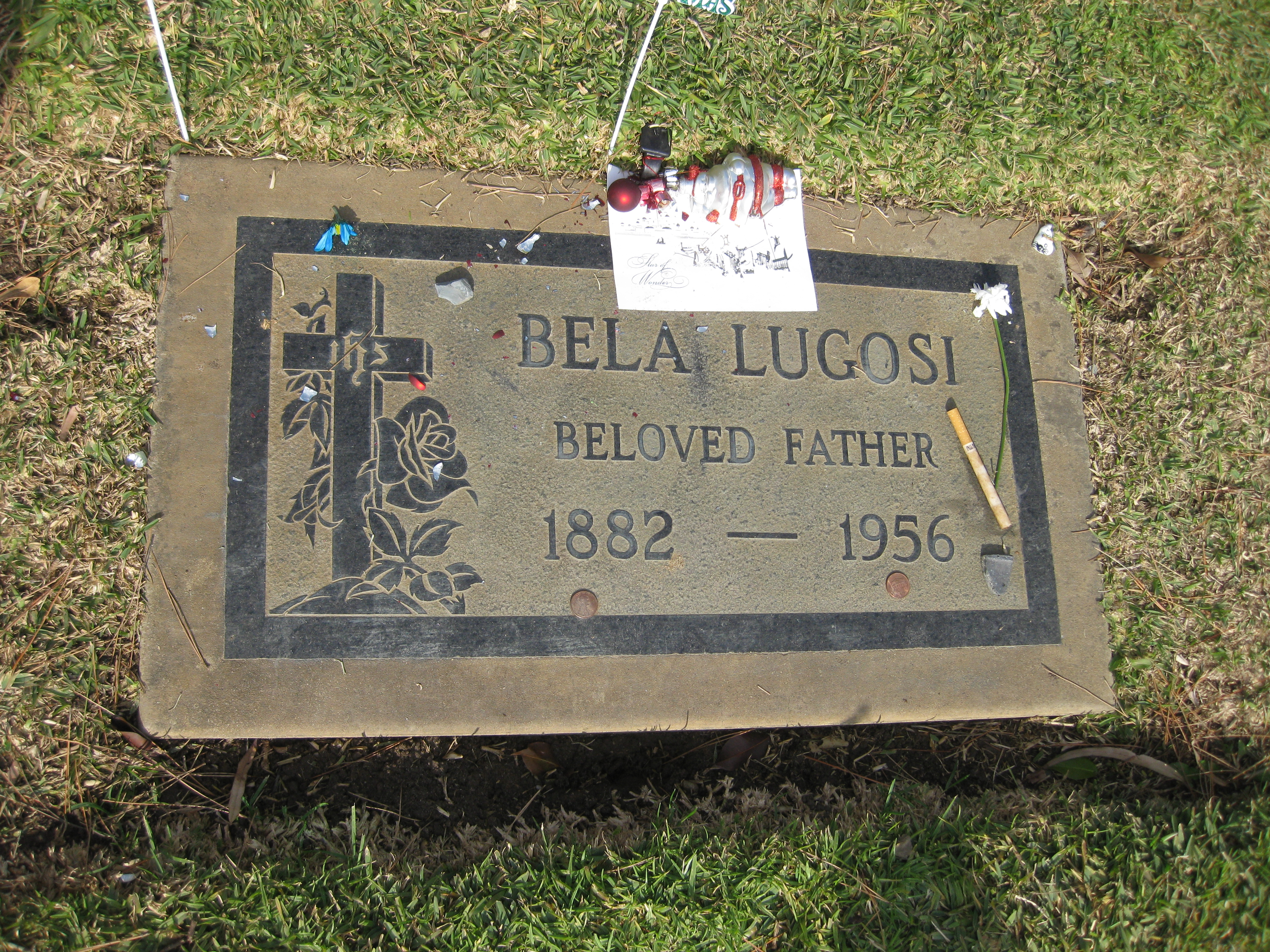
Lugosi's grave at Holy Cross Cemetery, Culver City, California

At age 73, Lugosi died of a heart attack on August 16, 1956, in the bedroom of his Los Angeles apartment while taking a nap. His wife discovered him when she came home from work that evening. According to the medical examiner, he died peacefully in his sleep around 6:45 p.m. The false rumor that Lugosi was clutching the script for The Final Curtain, a planned Ed Wood project, at the time of his death was a myth.

Lugosi was buried wearing a Dracula cape, his full costume, and his Dracula ring in the Holy Cross Cemetery in Culver City, California. Contrary to popular belief, Lugosi never requested to be buried in his cloak; Béla G. Lugosi confirmed on numerous occasions that he and his mother, Lillian, made the decision but believed that it is what his father would have wanted.

His funeral service was held on Saturday, August 18 at the Utter-McKinley Mortuary in Hollywood. Attendees in addition to immediate family included his former wife Lillian, Forrest J. Ackerman, Ed Wood (pall bearer), Tor Johnson, Conrad Brooks, Richard Sheffield, Norma McCarty, Loretta King, Paul Marco, and George Becwar. Béla's fourth wife Lillian paid for the cemetery plot and stone (which was inscribed "Beloved Father"), while Hope Lugosi paid for the coffin and the funeral service. Lugosi's will left several inexpensive pieces of real estate in Elsinore and only $1,000 cash to his son, but since the will had been written before Lugosi's fifth marriage, Béla Jr. had to share the thousand dollars evenly with Hope Lugosi.

Hope later gave most of Lugosi's personal belongings and memorabilia to Béla's young neighborhood friend Richard Sheffield, who gave Lugosi's duplicate Dracula cape to Béla Jr. and sold some other items to Forrest J. Ackerman. Hope told Sheffield she had searched the apartment for several days looking for $3,000 she suspected Lugosi had hidden there, but she never found it. Years later, Sheffield said "Lugosi had probably spent it all on alcohol." Hope later moved to Hawaii, where she worked for many years as a caregiver in a leper colony. Hope died in Hawaii in 1997, at age 78, having never remarried. Before her death, she gave several interviews to the fan press.

== California Supreme Court decision on personality rights ==
In 1979, the Lugosi v. Universal Pictures decision by the California Supreme Court held that Lugosi's personality rights could not pass to his heirs, as a copyright would have. The court ruled that under California law, any rights of publicity, including the right to his image, terminated with Lugosi's death. (Note: California's descendibility statute for rights of publicity, Civil Code Section 990, was enacted in 1988, and Lugosi's estate now licenses the commercial use of his name and image. The right of publicity in some states endures for 50, 70, 75 or 100 years past the death of the celebrity.) Six years later, the law was changed by the California Celebrities Rights Act.

== Legacy ==
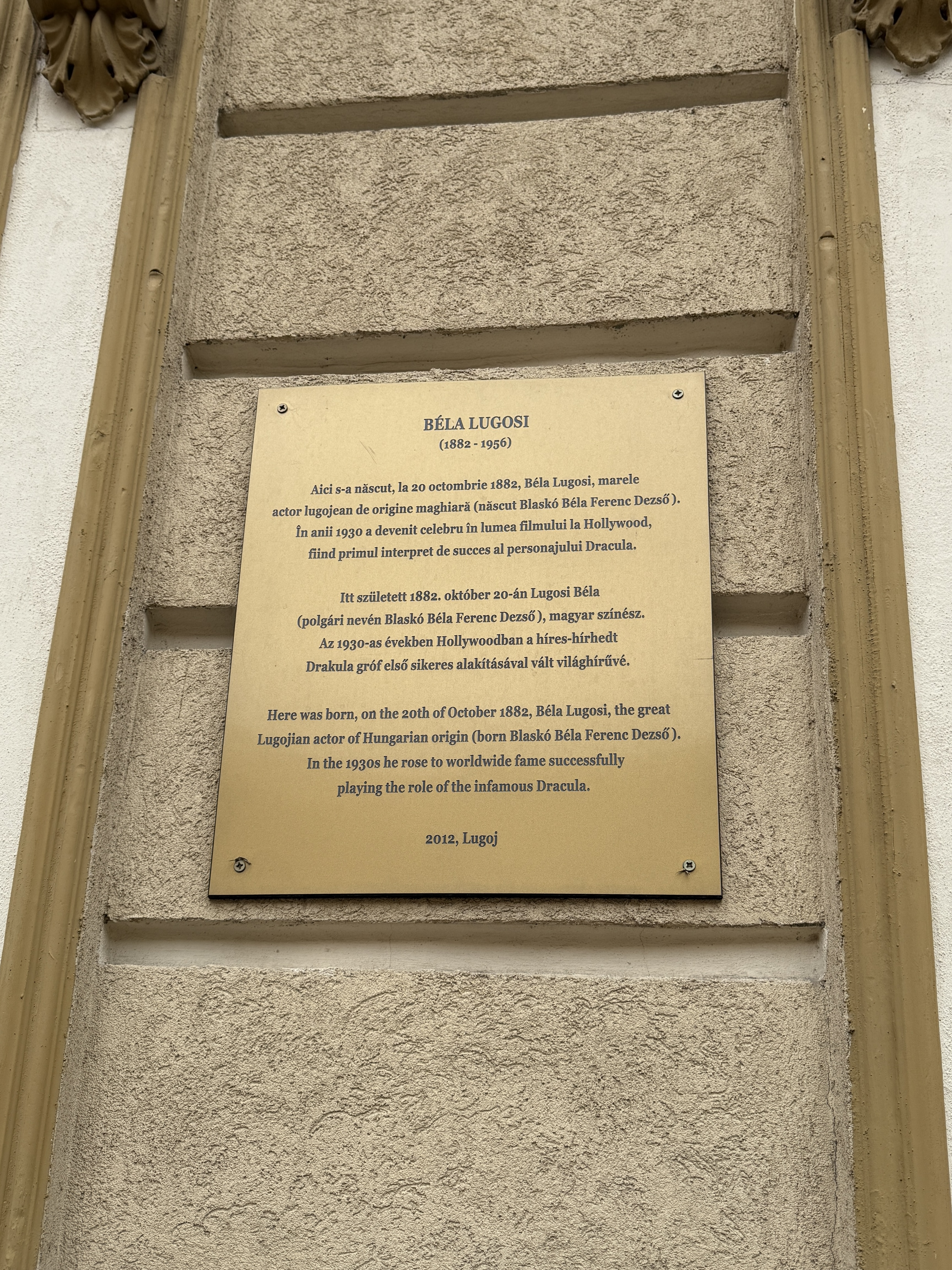
The memorial plaque on the house in Lugoj where Béla Lugosi was born, located on Bucegi Street, no. 6

The cape Lugosi wore in Dracula (1931) was in the possession of his son until it was put up for auction in 2011. It was expected to sell for up to $2 million, but afterward was listed again by Bonhams in 2018. In 2019, the Academy Museum of Motion Pictures announced acquisition of the cape via partial donation from the Lugosi family, and stated that the cape would be on display beginning in 2020.

Andy Warhol's 1963 silkscreen The Kiss depicts Lugosi from Dracula about to bite into the neck of co-star Helen Chandler, who played Mina Harker. A copy sold for $798,000 at Christie's in May 2000.

Lugosi was given a star on the Hollywood Walk of Fame in 1960. His star is mentioned in "Celluloid Heroes", a song performed by the Kinks and written by their lead vocalist and principal songwriter, Ray Davies. It appeared on their 1972 album Everybody's in Show-Biz.

In 1979, the song "Béla Lugosi's Dead" was released by UK post-punk band Bauhaus. It has since been noted as a pioneering song in the gothic rock genre. On the song's topic, the band's bassist David J remarked "There was a season of old horror films on TV and I was telling Daniel about how much I loved them. The one that had been on the night before was Dracula. I was saying how Béla Lugosi was the quintessential Dracula, the elegant depiction of the character."

An episode of Sledge Hammer! titled "Last of the Red Hot Vampires" was a homage to Lugosi; at the end of the episode, it was dedicated to "Mr. Blasko".

Béla Lugosi and Boris Karloff are referenced in Curtis Stigers' song "Sleeping with the Lights On", from the 1991 album Curtis Stigers.

In Tim Burton's Ed Wood, Béla Lugosi is portrayed by Martin Landau, who received the 1994 Academy Award for Best Supporting Actor for the performance. According to Béla G. Lugosi (his son), Forrest Ackerman, Dolores Fuller and Richard Sheffield, the film's portrayal of Lugosi is inaccurate: In real life, he never used profanity, did not hate Karloff, owned no small dogs, nor did he sleep in a coffin. Additionally, Ed Wood did not meet Lugosi in a funeral parlor, but rather through his roommate Alex Gordon.

Péter Müller's 1998 theatrical play Lugosi – the Shadow of the Vampire (Hungarian: Lugosi – a vámpír árnyéka) is based on Lugosi's life, focusing on his struggles with becoming typecast as Dracula and his worsening drug addiction. In the Hungarian production, directed by István Szabó, Lugosi was played by Ivan Darvas.

In 2001, BBC Radio 4 broadcast There Are Such Things by Steven McNicoll and Mark McDonnell. Focusing on Lugosi and his well-documented struggle to escape from the role that had typecast him, the play went on to receive the Hamilton Deane Award for best dramatic presentation from the Dracula Society in 2002.

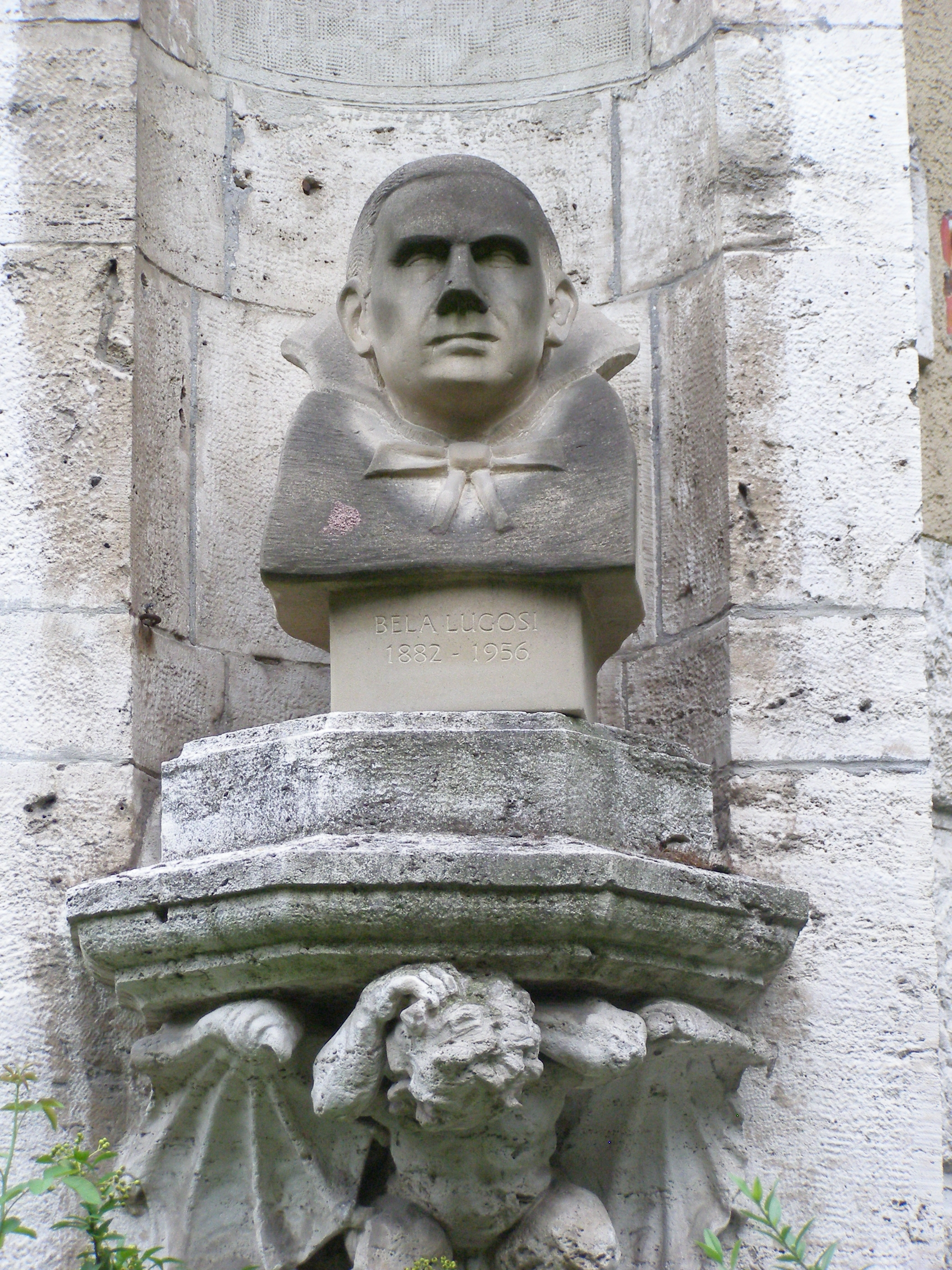
Bust of Lugosi on Vajdahunyad Castle in Budapest, Hungary.

On July 19, 2003, German artist Hartmut Zech erected a bust of Lugosi on one of the corners of Vajdahunyad Castle in Budapest.

The Ellis Island Immigration Museum in New York City features a live 30-minute play that focuses on Lugosi's illegal entry into the country via New Orleans and his arrival at Ellis Island months later to enter the country legally.

In 2013, the Hungarian electronic music band Žagar recorded a song entitled "Mr. Lugosi", which contains a recording of Béla Lugosi's voice. The song was a part of the Light Leaks record.

Legoshi, the main character of the Japanese manga/anime Beastars, was named in honor of Béla Lugosi.

In 2020, Legendary Comics published an adaptation of Bram Stoker's 1897 Dracula novel, which used the likeness of Lugosi.

In 2021, the name Vampirococcus lugosii was given to a bacterium that feeds on other bacteria like a vampire.

The Castlevania-inspired video game Carpathian Night Starring Béla Lugosi, as per the title, utilizes Lugosi's licensed likeness. Developed by Tezcatek, it was released in 2024 on Steam, Xbox and Nintendo Switch.
