= Cineverse =

American entertainment company

Cineverse Corp.
- Logo used since 2023
- Formerly: Access IT Digital Media, Inc. (2000–2013); Cinedigm (2013–2023)
- Type: Public
- Traded as: Nasdaq: CNVS; Russell Microcap Index component
- Industry: Entertainment
- Founded: 2000; 26 years ago
- Founders: Bud Mayo
- Headquarters: Los Angeles, California & New York City, New York
- Key people: Chris McGurk (chairman and CEO); Gary Loffredo (president); Erick Opeka (Chief strategy officer)
- Products: Motion pictures Entertainment; Video on demand Digital distribution Film distribution DVD and Blu-ray distribution
- Revenue: ▼US$65.7 million (2026)
- Net income: ▼ −US$8.66 million (2026)
- Subsidiaries: Bloody Disgusting; The Dove Channel; The Film Detective; New Video; SD Entertainment
- Website: cineverse.com

Cineverse Corp. (originally Access IT Digital Media, Inc., and later, Cinedigm) is an American entertainment company headquartered in Los Angeles, California. Cineverse’s businesses encompass digital cinema, streaming channels, content marketing, and distribution.

== History ==
=== Early years ===
Logo from 2014 to 2023

The company was founded in 2000, under the name Access IT Digital Media, Inc., through a group led by Bud Mayo. Mayo served as director until his retirement in 2010, and subsequently founded Digital Cinema Destinations Corp. In September 2013, the company changed its name to Cinedigm Corp. In January 2011, Chris McGurk became the new chairman and CEO.

In July 2011, the company sold its physical and electronic distribution business to Technicolor. The following month, Screenvision acquired UniqueScreen Media, Inc. (USM), the cinema advertising division of Cinedigm Digital Cinema Corp. The companies entered into a long-term agreement, with Cinedigm providing distribution and promotion for Screenvision.

In April 2012, the company acquired distributor New Video.

In October 2013, the company acquired Gaiam Vivendi Entertainment.

In May 2014, Cinedigm established Docurama, an OTT documentary channel, focused on documentaries and film festival coverage. Later that year, Jeffrey Edell would join as CFO, and the company began trading on the NASDAQ under the ticker symbol.

=== Expansion into Video on Demand ===
In February 2015, Cinedigm and Wizard World launched CONtv. In June of that year, Cinedigm would acquire a minority stake in Shout! Factory. Finally, in September, Cinedigm partnered with The Dove Foundation to create The Dove Channel, an online streaming service focusing on faith-based programming.

In December 2017, control of Cinedigm was given to Bison Capital of Hong Kong to start one of the first China-U.S Studios.

On February 5, 2019, Cinedigm acquired streaming service Viewster and its Viewster Anime subsidiary. Viewster would eventually merge with CONtv and rebrand as CONtv Anime on June 13, 2020.

In April of that year, Cinedigm licensed content from Chinese firms CCTV, China Lion, Starrise Media and Youku, in order to launch an entertainment and film service called Bambu; the service would launch on October 22, 2019.

In 2020, Cinedigm acquired The Film Detective.

In February 2021, Cinedigm acquired the horror-genre streaming service, Screambox. Later that year, on September 21, 2021, Cinedigm acquired Bloody Disgusting. As part of the acquisition, Screambox would be relaunched under the curation and management of Bloody Disgusting.

In August 2021, Cinedigm announced a partnership with Robert Rodriguez to relaunch the former cable and satellite-based El Rey Network as a streaming channel.

In December 2021, Cinedigm signed a deal with SideStream, a live video streaming service.

In March 2022, Cinedigm acquired streaming, advertising and distribution company, Digital Media Rights; including the ad-supported streaming services YuYu (now Cinehouse), AsianCrush, RetroCrush, Midnight Pulp, Cocoro (now discontinued), and KMTV.

=== Cineverse launch and rebranding ===
On September 15, 2022, Cinedigm launched Cineverse, marketed as the company's flagship streaming service, featuring programming from across its AVOD (ad-supported video on demand) and FAST (free, ad-supported, television) brands.

In May 2023, the company rebranded to Cineverse Corp. and began trading on NASDAQ under CNVS. The company stated that it was an "important step forward" in its "evolution into a streaming content and technology company".

In June 2023, Cineverse announced that it would signed a content deal with Sid and Marty Krofft Pictures, allowing it to acquire the worldwide digital distribution rights to its library of shows, with the exceptions of The Brady Bunch Hour (owned by Paramount Television, now part of CBS Media Ventures), D.C. Follies (owned by Amazon MGM Studios) and Mutt & Stuff (owned by Paramount Media Networks under the Nick Jr. brand) and they would launch a VOD channel, called the Sid and Marty Krofft Channel on February 5, 2024.

In August of 2025, Cineverse and Lloyd Braun's Banyan Ventures formed a JV to Launch MicroCo, a New Studio and Platform for Microseries.

On September 10, 2025, Cineverse announced the launch of new channel HISTORIAN, a new free ad-supported streaming television (FAST) channel from American Public Television as a partnership with LG Channels.

== List of Cineverse films ==
Starting in October 2024, Cineverse began distributing films theatrically (currently for American markets only).

| Release date | Title | Notes |
|---|---|---|
| October 11, 2024 | Terrifier 3 | |
| August 29, 2025 | The Toxic Avenger | |
| October 31, 2025 | Lesbian Space Princess | USA distribution |
| October 31, 2025 | Self-Help | |
| November 14, 2025 | The Things You Kill | |
| December 12, 2025 | Silent Night, Deadly Night | |
| January 23, 2026 | Return to Silent Hill | |
| February 10, 2026 | Misdirection | |
| May 14, 2026 | Monkey's Magic Merry Go Round | |
| June 9, 2026 | Let's Love | |
| June 23, 2026 | Chapter 51 | |
| July 28, 2026 | Due West | |
| October 9, 2026 | Pan's Labyrinth | 20th anniversary re-release Co-distribution with Fathom Entertainment; Originally distributed by Picturehouse and Warner Bros. Pictures |
| January 22, 2027 | Air Bud Returns | |
| March 19, 2027 | Wolf Creek: Legacy | |
| August 13, 2027 | Jason | USA distribution |

== Television and streaming ==
Cineverse owns or programs the following brands for either its namesake streaming service, or standalone services and apps, as of 2026.

- AsianCrush
- The Bob Ross Channel
- Comedy Dynamics (The Nacelle Company)
- CONtv
- Docurama
- Dog Whisperer Channel
- The Dove Channel
- El Rey Network
- The Elvis Presley Channel
- EntrepreneurTV
- Fandor
- First Responders Network
- Gusto TV
- Insight TV
- Maverick Black Cinema
- MeatEater TV
- Midnight Pulp
- Nacelle Pop
- QTTV
- Real Madrid TV
- RetroCrush
- Row8
- Screambox
- Sid and Marty Krofft Channel
- So...Real
- So…Dramatic

== Operations ==
Cineverse owns the following operations:

- Cineverse Technology Group, Formed: May. 2025
  - Matchpoint™
    - cineSearch
    - Giant Worldwide, Acquired: Jan. 2026
    - IndiCue, Acquired: Feb. 2026
      - VAUDIO™, Launched: Sept. 2026
