= Chris McGurk =

American film producer

- Born: Christopher J. McGurk; January 16, 1957; Boston, Massachusetts, U.S.
- Education: Syracuse University, University of Chicago
- Occupations: Chairman and CEO, Cineverse
- Years active: 2011–present
- Title: Cookie Jar Entertainment Holdings (Director); Walt Disney Studios (Director, 1994-1996); Universal Pictures (President and Chief Operating Officer, 1996-1999); Metro-Goldwyn-Mayer (Vice Chairman of the Board and Chief Operating Officer, 1999-2005)
- Board member of: American Cinematheque

Chris McGurk is chairman and CEO of Cineverse (NASDAQ: CNVS), a publicly traded entertainment and streaming technology company. Cineverse distributes content across all windows and platforms, from theatrical to digital to physical, and most recently released breakout hit horror film Terrifier 3. McGurk has enjoyed a long and transformative executive career in the film, TV and streaming content industries. Before joining Cineverse in 2011, McGurk was the founder and CEO of Overture Films and CEO of Anchor Bay Entertainment. Prior to that, McGurk served in several executive leadership roles including Vice Chairman and COO of MGM Studios Metro-Goldwyn-Mayer, President and COO of Universal Pictures Universal Pictures and President of The Walt Disney Motion Picture Group Walt Disney Studios.

== Cineverse ==
In May 2023, under the leadership of Chairman and CEO Chris McGurk, Cinedigm rebranded as Cineverse, marking a shift from its digital cinema business to a new focus on streaming and independent films. Cineverse manages a library of over 71,000 films, series and podcasts, distributing them across a network of more than 30 streaming channels. These include genre-driven platforms like Screambox for horror enthusiasts, the Dove Channel for women’s entertainment and Fandor for independent film lovers. The company claims to reach over 150 million unique users per month with more than one billion minutes of curated content monthly across platforms.

Under McGurk’s leadership, Cineverse released Terrifier 3, which became the highest-grossing unrated film in U.S. history., earning approximately $90 million in global revenue. Cineverse is also the owner of Bloody Disgusting, a leading horror media brand acquired in 2021. Cineverse also released a reboot of The Toxic Avenger in August 2025.

Cineverse has also invested in proprietary technology. This includes streaming platform Matchpoint.tv, which offers OTT operators tools for content ingestion, automation and monetization. CineSearch.com is an AI-powered content discovery engine designed to help users find and personalize streaming across platforms. Cineverse also operates C360.com, its programmatic advertising hub, enabling buyers and brands to target audiences across its network of streaming channels through automated ad solutions. In the audio space, Cineverse operates the Cineverse Podcast Network. This includes BloodyFM, a horror and true crime podcast label featuring popular shows like Murder in America, Tower 4 and Dead Meat. Additionally, the network offers entertainment and comedy content.

== Career ==
Chris McGurk received a Bachelor of Science degree in accounting from Syracuse University School of Management and a Master of Business Administration degree from the University of Chicago Graduate School of Business.

He served as executive vice president and chief financial officer thereof from 1990 to 1994, and the president of Walt Disney Studios, a division of The Walt Disney Company, from 1994 to 1996.

From 1996 to 1999, McGurk joined Universal Pictures, where he served in various executive capacities, including president and chief operating officer

From 1999 to 2005, McGurk was vice chairman of the board and chief operating officer of Metro-Goldwyn-Mayer (“MGM”), acting as the company’s lead operating executive until MGM was sold. In 2003, Premiere’s annual Power 100 List Ranked McGurk #24 with MGM Chairman Alex Yemenidjian.

McGurk played the leading role in MGM's reinvigoration, spearheading efforts that resulted MGM's industry leadership in Home Entertainment library sales, marketing and distribution. McGurk maximized the asset value of Hollywood's largest modern film library, transformed the United Artists label into a specialty film unit and negotiated strategic alliances with Twentieth Century Fox and NBC.

He served as senior advisor of new ventures of Starz Media (also called IDT Entertainment) from April 5, 2006 to November 2006.

McGurk founded and served as the chief executive officer of Overture Films, a wholly owned subsidiary of Starz, from November 13, 2006, to July 2010. He was also CEO of Anchor Bay Entertainment, which distributed Overture Films’ product to the home entertainment industry.
