= Lugosi v. Universal Pictures =

1979 Californian decision on celebrity personality rights

- Supreme Court of California

Decided December 3, 1979
- Full case name: Bela George Lugosi, et al., Plaintiffs and Appellants v. Universal Pictures, Defendants and Appellants.
- Citation(s): 603 P.2d 425

Case history
- Subsequent history: none

Holding
- Personality rights are personal to the holder and must be exercised within the holder's lifetime; they do not descend to the holder's heirs.

Court membership
- Chief Justice: Rose Elizabeth Bird
- Associate Justices: Matthew Tobriner, Stanley Mosk, William P. Clark, Jr., Wiley Manuel, Frank K. Richardson, Frank C. Newman

Case opinions
- Per curiam.
- Concurrence: Mosk
- Dissent: Bird, joined by Manuel, Tobriner
- Superseded by
- California Celebrities Rights Act

Lugosi v. Universal Pictures, 603 P.2d 425 (Cal. 1979), was a decision of the Supreme Court of California with regard to the personality rights of celebrities, particularly addressing whether these rights descended to the celebrities' heirs. The suit was brought by the heirs of Béla Lugosi, his son Bela Jr. and his fifth wife Hope Lugosi, who jointly sued Universal Pictures in 1966 for using his personality rights without the heirs' permission on toys, posters, model kits and the like. The trial court initially ruled in favor of the Lugosi heirs, but Universal Studios won the case in an appeal. The court determined that a dead person had no right to their likeness, and any rights that existed did not pass to their heirs.

== History ==
In September 1930, Béla Lugosi and Universal Pictures had entered into an agreement for the production of the film Dracula in which Lugosi played the title role under a signed contract. Hope Linninger Lugosi, his widow, and Bela George Lugosi, his son, filed a complaint against Universal on February 3, 1966, alleging that they were the heirs of Béla Lugosi and that Universal had, commencing in 1960, appropriated and continued to appropriate property which they had inherited from Lugosi and which was not part of the agreement with Universal. The Lugosis asserted that from 1960 until the present time, Universal entered into many licensing agreements which authorized the licensees to use the Count Dracula character.

== Ruling ==
After eleven years of litigation, the trial judge ruled in favor of the Lugosi heirs, awarded them $70,000, and barred Universal Studios from merchandising Lugosi's likeness. The decision was appealed and the California Supreme Court ruled that "the right to exploit one's name and likeness is personal to the artist and must be exercised, if at all, by him during his lifetime." The result was a loss for the concept of inheriting personality rights in California.

== Aftermath ==
The California Celebrities Rights Act of 1986 created an inheritable right to a person's name or likeness for 70 years after death. Legislation passed in 2007 extended that right retroactively to all persons who have died since January 1, 1938.

== See also ==
- Shaw Family Archives Ltd. v. CMG Worldwide, Inc. (2007), a court case involving Marilyn Monroe's posthumous personality rights
