= Dove Channel (streaming service) =

American digital streaming subscription service

- Industry: Entertainment
- Founded: September 2015
- Headquarters: Los Angeles, California, U.S.
- Area served: North America
- Services: digital streaming
- Number of employees: 20
- Parent: Cineverse
- Website: www.dovechannel.com

Dove Channel is a direct-to-consumer, over-the-top digital streaming subscription service. Dove Channel is available on Amazon for $4.99 per month after a 7-day free trial. Dove Channel is also available on Roku. Dove Channel offers a library of family-friendly and Christian-based programming. The channel is a partnership between Cineverse (then known as Cinedigm) and The Dove Foundation. Collectively, Dove Channel features more than 900 hours of new and original content, as well as classics from television and film.

The first exclusive offering on Dove Channel is the first season of Austentatious, a modern take on the works of Jane Austen. All content on the Dove Channel is sortable and searchable using the Dove Rating System, which ranks programs in six key criteria, including sexuality, language, violence, drug and alcohol use, and nudity to ensure appropriate programming for children and families.
