= The Fatal Hour =

The Fatal Hour may refer to:

- The Fatal Hour (1908 film), directed by D. W. Griffith
- The Fatal Hour (1920 film), a lost 1920 film directed by George W. Terwilliger
- The Fatal Hour (1937 film), a British film directed by George Pearson
- The Fatal Hour (1940 film), starring Boris Karloff
- Fatal Hour: The Assassination of President Kennedy by Organized Crime, a 1992 book by G. Robert Blakey and Richard N. Billings

== See also ==
- The Sleeping Cardinal, a 1931 British mystery film released in the US as Sherlock Holmes' Fatal Hour
- Two Against the World (1936 film), a Humphrey Bogart film also known as One Fatal Hour
