= California Celebrities Rights Act =

1985 personality rights legislation

The section of California Civil Code notating this Act.

The Celebrities Rights Act or Celebrity Rights Act was passed in California in 1985, which enabled a celebrity's personality rights to survive their death. Previously, the 1979 Lugosi v. Universal Pictures decision by the California Supreme Court held that Bela Lugosi's personality rights could not pass to his heirs, as a copyright would have. The court ruled that any rights of publicity, and rights to his image, terminated with Lugosi's death.

California Civil Code section 3344 is for the publicity rights of living persons, while Civil Code section 3344.1, known as the Astaire Celebrity Image Protection Act, grants statutory post mortem rights to the estate of a "deceased personality", where:

- that personality had been "any natural person whose name, voice, signature, photograph, or likeness has commercial value at the time of his or her death",
- any person using such personality's "name, voice, signature, photograph or likeness on or in products, merchandise or goods" without prior consent was liable to be sued for damages and profits arising from the unauthorized use, and
- such prior consent may only be given by persons to whom the personality had transferred such power by contract or trust prior to his death, or by trust or will after his death, or, where no such latter provision was made, his spouse, children, and/or grandchildren, but
- "a play, book, magazine, newspaper, musical composition, audiovisual work, radio or television program, single and original work of art, work of political or newsworthy value, or an advertisement or commercial announcement for any of these works, shall not be considered a product, article of merchandise, good, or service if it is fictional or nonfictional entertainment, or a dramatic, literary, or musical work."

In 1999, the period of protection was extended from fifty years after a person's death to seventy years. Similar laws have been enacted by 12 other states in the United States.

== Cases ==
In 1998, Princess Diana's estate sued the Franklin Mint for selling products bearing her likeness. The lawsuit filed May 18, 1998 in U.S. District Court in Los Angeles said the Franklin Mint "failed to obtain consent to use Princess Diana's identity and trademark ... and embarked on a campaign to profit from Princess Diana's death." On June 27, 2000, the U.S. District Court for the Central District of California issued a summary judgment in favor of the Franklin Mint. Franklin Mint countersued Diana's estate's lawyers for "malicious prosecution of trademark"—in January 2011 the law firm settled with a $25 million payment to the former owners of the Franklin Mint.

Shaw Family Archives Ltd. v. CMG Worldwide, Inc., 486 F.Supp.2d 309 (S.D.N.Y., 2007) ruled on May 7, 2007 that in regard to Marilyn Monroe, because she died before California's Celebrity Rights Act was passed in 1985, and the state of New York does not recognize a right of publicity after the artist's death, her name, image, and voice are now in the public domain in the states of California and New York. By implication, they would also be in the public domain in any state that, at the time of Monroe's death in 1962, did not recognize a right of publicity that survived the artist's death. In response to that court ruling, California passed legislation that created descendible rights of publicity that last 70 years after death, retroactively for any person deceased after January 1, 1938. A similar law has failed in the New York Legislature.
