= Viewster =

Defunct video on demand service

- Available in: English, Spanish, German, French
- Headquarters: Zürich, Switzerland
- Area served: Global
- Founders: Kai Henniges, Jörg Boksberger
- Industry: Video on Demand
- Parent: Cinedigm (2019)
- Registration: Not required
- Launched: 2007
- Current status: Inactive since February 2013

Viewster was a video on demand service that was founded in 2007 and headquartered in Zurich, Switzerland. Viewster offered a wide range of ad-supported free TV shows and movies.

== History ==
Viewster AG was founded in 2007 by Kai Henniges and Jörg Boksberger in Zurich (Switzerland). Viewster had offices in Zurich, London, New York City, Berlin, Adelaide. In 2011 the service was renamed from "Diva" to "Viewster."

Viewster's Video on demand service was available in more than 120 countries. According to third party audits, Viewster reached more than 39 million unique visitors per month and ranked top 10 online video property in the U.S. in August 2014.

In October 2012, Viewster released native iOS and Android applications to make the Video on demand service available on tablets and smartphones.

On February 5, 2019, Viewster was acquired by distributor Cinedigm. The following year, the service was merged into CONtv and replaced with CONtv Anime on June 13, 2020.

== Content ==
Viewster's catalog included a broad range of TV shows, including anime (some of them as simulcasts in European countries) and Korean dramas.
