= C3 Entertainment =

American entertainment company

C3 Entertainment, Inc.
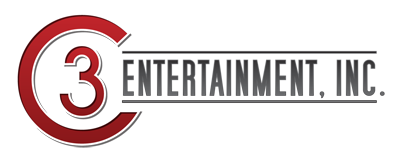
- Industry: Film television
- Genre: Comedy
- Founded: 1959
- Founder: Moe Howard
- Headquarters: Gardena Ave, Glendale, CA
- Key people: Earl Benjamin (CEO)
- Products: Motion pictures Television shows

C3 Entertainment, Inc., formerly Comedy III Productions, is an American entertainment and licensing company founded in 1959 by American comedy act The Three Stooges.

== History ==
Throughout the Three Stooges' career, Moe Howard acted as both their main creative force and business manager. Comedy III was formed by Moe, Larry Fine and Joe DeRita to manage all business and merchandise transactions for the team, with each stooge holding an equal stake. C3 Entertainment was basically in the background, with Moe's son-in-law, Norman Maurer managing the comedy teams' film interests under Normandy Productions, and merchandising affairs under Norman Maurer Productions. Norman Maurer died of cancer in 1986.

In 1993, Joe (who died while the suit was pending) and Larry's granddaughter filed a breach-of-contract lawsuit against Moe's daughter Joan Howard Maurer and her son Jeffrey, who had inherited the NMP/Normandy business. The lawsuit alleged that the Maurers had cheated the DeRita and Fine families out of their share of royalties. Maurer was ordered to pay $2.6 million in damages: $1.6 million was for compensatory damages to Jean DeRita, while the remaining $1 million went to Fine's granddaughter. The Fine and DeRita families were represented by California attorney Bela Lugosi Jr.

The resulting 1994 lawsuit led to the reestablishment of C3 as a three-way interest of Fine, Howard, and DeRita. The DeRita heirs received the proxy to the Howard share, giving them majority control on the company's management. Joe DeRita's stepsons, Robert and Earl Benjamin, became the senior management of C3, with Lugosi Jr. serving as an executive board member for several years. The Benjamins later incorporated the company, and C3 is currently the owner of all Three Stooges trademarks and merchandising. Larry's great-grandson Kurt Lamond is the representative of the Fines' one-third interest in the company.

C3 also represents other personalities and brands, Ritchie Valens and The Big Bopper, the last of which is authorized through representation by granddaughter Ashlyn Adams, her husband Kevin Ray Adams, and her mother Patty Richardson (widow of son Jay Richardson). Through its stewardship of the Big Bopper and Ritchie Valens brands, C3 Entertainment promotes a "Winter Dance Party" tribute band for live concerts, emulating the ultimately fatal concert tour featuring Valens, the Big Bopper and Buddy Holly.
