= Lenny Bruce =

American comedian and social critic (1925–1966)

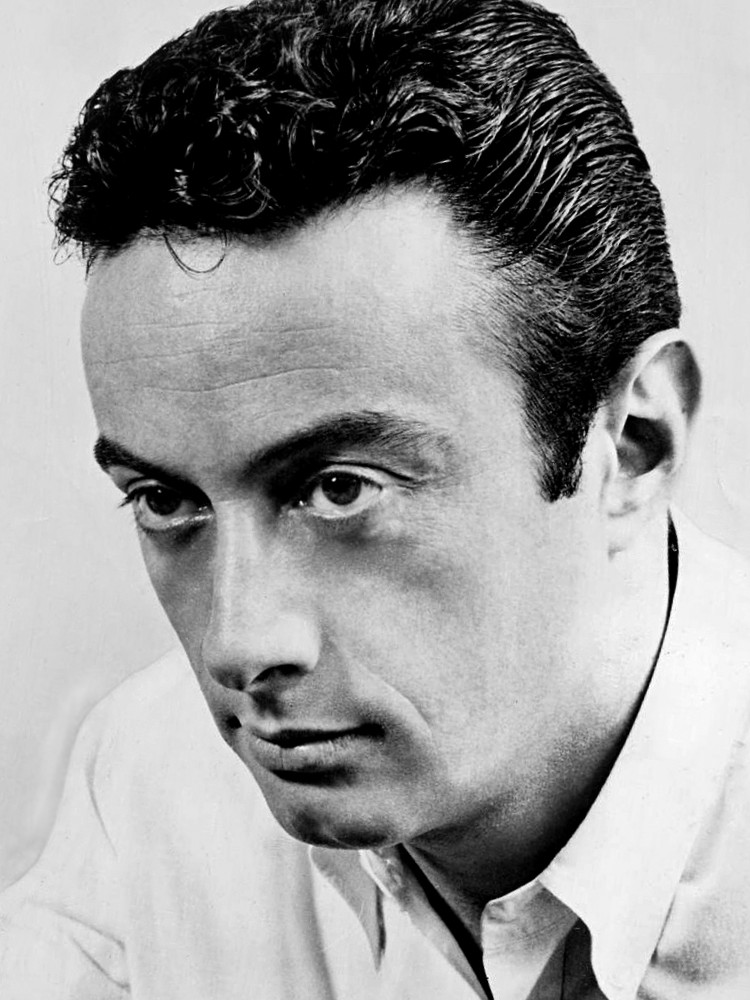
- Bruce in 1961
- Born: Leonard Alfred Schneider; October 13, 1925; Mineola, New York, U.S.
- Died: August 3, 1966 (aged 40); Los Angeles, California, U.S.
- Resting place: Eden Memorial Park Cemetery
- Occupations: Comedian; satirist; social critic
- Years active: 1947–1966
- Spouse: Honey Bruce (m. 1951; div. 1957)
- Children: 1
- Relatives: Sally Marr (mother)
- Notable work: The Lenny Bruce Originals; The Carnegie Hall Concert; Let the Buyer Beware; How to Talk Dirty and Influence People

Comedy career
- Medium: Stand-up; television; books
- Genres: Satire; political satire; black comedy; blue comedy
- Subjects: American culture; American politics; race relations; religion; sexuality; obscenity

Leonard Alfred Schneider (October 13, 1925 – August 3, 1966), better known by his stage name Lenny Bruce, was an American stand-up comedian, social critic, and satirist. He was renowned for his open, free-wheeling, and critical style of comedy that combined satire, politics, religion, sex, and vulgarity. His 1964 conviction in an obscenity trial was followed by a posthumous pardon in 2003.

Bruce forged new paths in comedy and counterculture. His trial for obscenity was a landmark of freedom of speech in the United States. In 2017, Rolling Stone magazine ranked Bruce third, behind Richard Pryor and George Carlin, on its list of the 50 best stand-up comics of all time.

== Early life ==
Bruce was born Leonard Alfred Schneider in Mineola, New York, to a Jewish family. His British-born father, Myron (Mickey) Schneider, was a shoe clerk; they saw each other very infrequently. His mother, Sally Marr (legal name Sadie Schneider, born Sadie Kitchenberg), was a stage performer and dancer who had an enormous influence on his career. Bruce grew up in Bellmore, New York, and attended Wellington C. Mepham High School. For some of his high school years, he lived at Dengler's Farm on Wantagh Avenue in Wantagh, New York. Bruce's parents divorced before he was 10, and he lived with various relatives over the next decade.

After spending time working on a farm, Bruce joined the United States Navy at the age of 16 in 1942, with active service during World War II aboard the USS Brooklyn (CL-40) in Northern Africa, Palermo in 1943, and Anzio, Italy, in 1944. In May 1945, after a comedic performance for his shipmates in which he was dressed in drag, his commanding officers became upset. He defiantly convinced his ship's medical officer that he was experiencing homosexual urges, leading to his undesirable discharge in July 1945. However, he had not admitted to or been found guilty of any breach of naval regulations, and successfully applied to change his discharge to "Under Honorable Conditions ... by reason of unsuitability for the naval service".

During the Korean War era, Bruce served in the United States Merchant Marine, ferrying troops from the US to Europe and back. In 1959, while videotaping the first episode of Hugh Hefner's Playboy's Penthouse, Bruce talked about his Navy experience and showed a tattoo he received in Malta in 1942. After a short period of time living with his father in California, Bruce settled in New York City, hoping to establish himself as a comedian. However, he found it difficult to differentiate himself from the thousands of other show business hopefuls who populated New York.

One place where they congregated was Hanson's, a diner where Bruce met Joe Ancis, who had a profound influence on Bruce's approach to comedy. Many of Bruce's later routines reflected his meticulous schooling at the hands of Ancis. According to Bruce's biographer Albert Goldman, Ancis's humor involved stream-of-consciousness sexual fantasies and references to jazz. He also gained notoriety for his focus on controversial subjects, black humor, obscenity, and criticism of organized religion and the establishment.

Bruce took the stage as "Lenny Marsalle" one evening at the Victory Club as a stand-in master of ceremonies for one of his mother's shows. His ad-libs earned him some laughs. Soon afterward, in 1947, just after changing his last name to Bruce, he earned $12 (equivalent to $173 in 2025) and a free spaghetti dinner for his first stand-up performance in Brooklyn. He was later a guest—‌and was introduced by his mother, calling herself Sally Bruce—‌on the Arthur Godfrey's Talent Scouts radio program. Lenny did a piece inspired by Sid Caesar, "The Bavarian Mimic", featuring impressions of American movie stars (e.g., Humphrey Bogart, James Cagney, and Edward G. Robinson).

== Career ==
Bruce's early comedy career included writing the screenplays for Dance Hall Racket in 1953, which featured Bruce, his wife Honey Harlow, and mother Sally Marr; Dream Follies in 1954, a low-budget burlesque romp; and a children's film, The Rocket Man, in 1954. In 1956, Frank Ray Perilli, a fellow nightclub comedian who later wrote two dozen successful films and plays, became Bruce's mentor and part-time manager. Through Perilli, Lenny Bruce met and collaborated with photojournalist William Karl Thomas on three screenplays (Leather Jacket, Killer's Grave and The Degenerate), none of which made it to the screen, and the comedy material on his first three comedy albums.

In the 1950s, Bruce was a roommate of comedian Buddy Hackett. The two appeared on the Patrice Munsel Show (1957–1958), calling their comedy duo the "Not Ready for Prime Time Players", 20 years before the cast of Saturday Night Live used the same name. In 1957, Thomas booked Bruce into the Slate Brothers nightclub, where he was fired the first night for what Variety headlined as "blue material".

This led to the theme of Bruce's first solo album on Berkeley-based Fantasy Records, The Sick Humor of Lenny Bruce, for which Thomas photographed the album cover. Thomas also photographed Bruce's other covers, acted as cinematographer on abortive attempts to film their screenplays, and in 1989 wrote a memoir of their ten-year collaboration, Lenny Bruce: The Making of a Prophet. The 2016 biography of Frank Ray Perilli, The Candy Butcher, devotes a chapter to Perilli's ten-year collaboration with Bruce.

Bruce released four albums of original material on Fantasy Records, later compiled and re-released as The Lenny Bruce Originals. Two later records were produced and sold by Bruce himself, including a 10-inch album of the 1961 San Francisco performances that started his legal troubles. Starting in the late 1960s, other unissued Bruce material was released by Alan Douglas, Frank Zappa and Phil Spector, as well as Fantasy. Bruce developed the complexity and tone of his material in Enrico Banducci's North Beach nightclub, the Hungry I, where Mort Sahl had earlier made a name for himself.

Branded a "sick comic", Bruce was essentially blacklisted from television, and when he did appear, thanks to sympathetic fans like Hefner and Steve Allen, it was with great concessions to Broadcast Standards and Practices. Jokes that might offend, like a routine on airplane-glue-sniffing teenagers that was done live for The Steve Allen Show in 1959, had to be typed out and pre-approved by network officials. On his debut on Allen's show, Bruce made an unscripted comment on the recent marriage of Elizabeth Taylor to Eddie Fisher, wondering, "Will Elizabeth Taylor become bar mitzvahed?"

In the midst of a severe blizzard, Bruce gave a famous performance at Carnegie Hall at midnight on February 4, 1961. It was recorded and later released as the three-disc set The Carnegie Hall Concert. In his posthumous biography of Bruce, Albert Goldman described that night:

It's all a trip—and the best of it is you haven't the faintest idea where you're going! Lenny worshiped the gods of Spontaneity, Candor and Free Association. His greatest fear was getting his act down pat. On this night, he rose to every chance stimulus, every interruption and noise and distraction, with a mad volleying of mental images that suggested the fantastic riches of Charlie Parker's horn. The first flash was simply the spectacle of people piled up in America's most famous concert hall.

In August 1965, a year before his death, Bruce gave his penultimate performance at San Francisco's Basin Street West, mainly talking about his legal troubles. The filmed performance was released by Rhino Home Video in 1992 as The Lenny Bruce Performance Film.

== Personal life ==
In 1951, Bruce met Honey Harlow, a stripper from Manila, Arkansas. They were married that year, and Bruce was determined to see her stop working as a stripper. The couple left New York in 1953 for the West Coast, where they found work as a double act at the Cup and Saucer in Los Angeles. Bruce joined a bill at the club Strip City. Harlow found employment at the Colony Club, widely known as the best burlesque club in Los Angeles at the time.

Bruce left Strip City in late 1954 and found work at various strip clubs in the San Fernando Valley. As master of ceremonies, he introduced strippers while performing his material. The Valley clubs provided the perfect environment for him to create new routines. According to his primary biographer, Albert Goldman, it was "precisely at the moment when he sank to the bottom of the barrel and started working the places that were the lowest of the low" that he suddenly broke free of "all the restraints and inhibitions and disabilities that formerly had kept him just mediocre and began to blow with a spontaneous freedom and resourcefulness that resembled the style and inspiration of his new friends and admirers, the jazz musicians of the modernist school."

Honey and Lenny's daughter Kathleen ("Kitty") Bruce was born in 1955. Honey and Lenny had a tumultuous relationship with many serious domestic disputes, usually the result of serious drug use. They broke up and reunited over and over again between 1956 and Lenny's death in 1966. They first separated in March 1956, and were back together by July of that year when they traveled to Honolulu for a nightclub tour. During the trip, Honey was arrested for marijuana possession and prevented from leaving the island due to her parole conditions. Lenny took this opportunity to leave her again, this time kidnapping one-year-old Kitty. In her autobiography, Honey claimed Lenny turned her in to the police. She was later sentenced to two years in federal prison.

Bruce's divorce from Honey was finalized in 1959. He had an affair with jazz singer Annie Ross in the late 1950s. Comedian Lotus Weinstock was Bruce's girlfriend and fiancee at the time of his death. Bruce had a severe drug addiction in the final decade of his life, using heroin, methamphetamine and hydromorphone (i.e., brand name Dilaudid) daily, and suffering numerous health problems and personal strife as a result. His death was caused by an overdose.

Kitty Bruce died at age 70 in Pittston, Pennsylvania on 13 May 2026 following a blood clot during a knee replacement surgery.

== Legal troubles ==
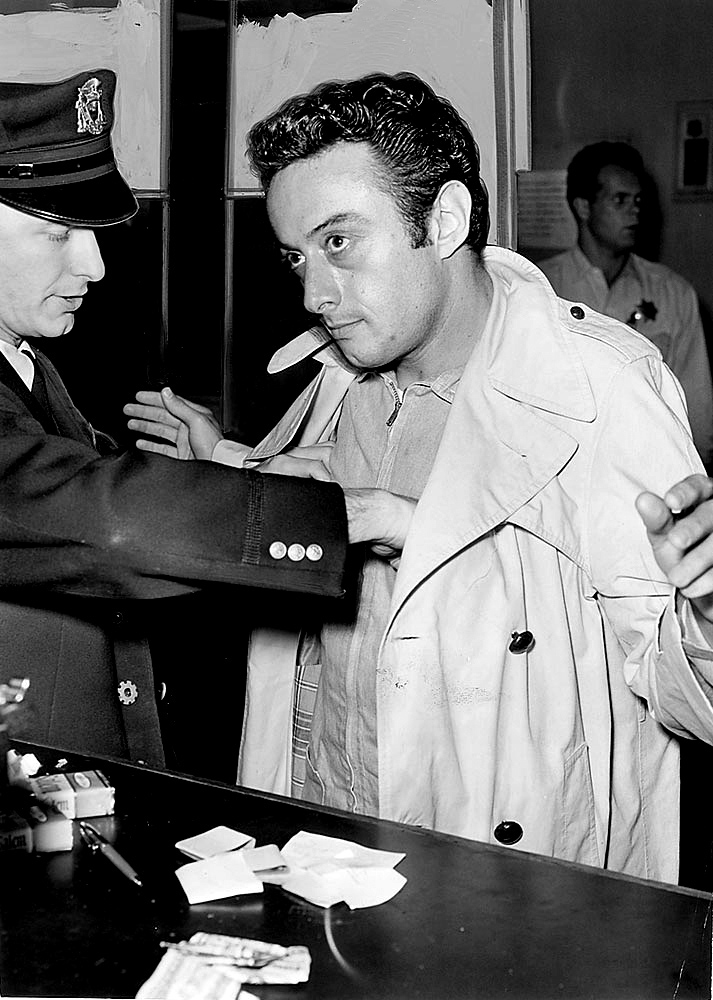
Bruce at his arrest in 1961

Bruce's desire to help his wife stop working as a stripper led him to pursue schemes designed to make as much money as possible. The most notable was the Brother Mathias Foundation scam, which resulted in Bruce's arrest in Miami, Florida, in 1951 for impersonating a priest. He was soliciting donations for a leper colony in British Guiana (now Guyana) under the auspices of the "Brother Mathias Foundation", which he had legally chartered—the name was his own invention, but possibly referred to the actual Brother Matthias who had befriended Babe Ruth at the Baltimore orphanage where Ruth had been confined as a child.

While posing as a laundry man, Bruce stole several priests' clergy shirts and a clerical collar. He was acquitted because of the legality of the New York state-chartered foundation, the actual existence of the Guiana leper colony, and the local clergy's inability to expose him as an impostor. Later, in his semifictional autobiography How to Talk Dirty and Influence People, Bruce said that he had made about $8,000 in three weeks, sending $2,500 to the leper colony and keeping the rest.

=== Obscenity arrests ===
On October 4, 1961, Bruce was arrested for obscenity at the Jazz Workshop in San Francisco, where he had used the word "cocksucker", and said that "to is a preposition, come is a verb"; that the sexual context of 'come' was so common that it bore no weight; and that if someone hearing it became upset, he "probably can't come". Although the jury acquitted him, other law enforcement agencies began monitoring his appearances, resulting in frequent arrests under obscenity charges.

Bruce was arrested again in 1961 in Philadelphia for drug possession, and again in Los Angeles two years later. The latter arrest took place in then-unincorporated West Hollywood, and the arresting officer was a deputy named Sherman Block, who later became county sheriff. The charge this time was that the comedian had used the word "schmuck", an insulting Yiddish word that was also considered a term for "penis". The Hollywood charges were later dismissed.

On December 5, 1962, Bruce was arrested on stage at the Gate of Horn folk club in Chicago. That year, he played at Peter Cook's The Establishment club in London, and in April the next year he was barred from entering the United Kingdom by the Home Office as an "undesirable alien".

On 3 April 1964, he appeared at the Cafe Au Go Go in Greenwich Village, with undercover police detectives in the audience. He was arrested along with club owners Howard and Elly Solomon, who were arrested for allowing an obscene performance. On both occasions, Bruce was arrested after leaving the stage.

A three-judge panel presided over his widely publicized six-month trial, prosecuted by Manhattan Assistant District Attorney Richard Kuh, with Ephraim London and Martin Garbus as the defense attorneys. Bruce and Howard Solomon were found guilty of obscenity on November 4, 1964. The conviction was announced despite positive testimony and petitions of support from—among other artists, writers and educators—Woody Allen, Bob Dylan, Jules Feiffer, Allen Ginsberg, Norman Mailer, William Styron, and James Baldwin, and Manhattan journalist and television personality Dorothy Kilgallen and sociologist Herbert Gans. Bruce was sentenced on December 21, 1964, to four months in a workhouse; he was set free on bail during the appeals process and died before the appeal was decided. Solomon, the owner of the club where Lenny was arrested, later saw Bruce's conviction overturned.

== Later years ==
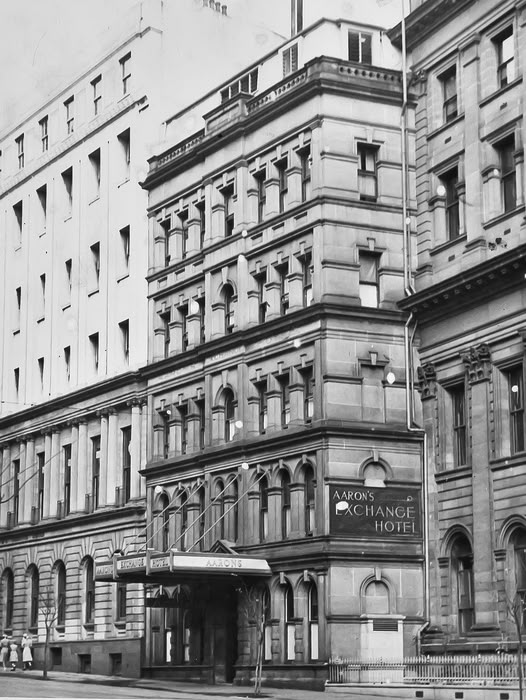
Aaron's Exchange Hotel, Sydney

The poster for Bruce's last series of performances, which took place at The Fillmore in San Francisco on June 24 and 25, 1966

Bruce appeared on network television only six times. In his later club performances, he was known for relating the details of his encounters with the police directly in his comedy routine. These performances often included rants about his court battles over obscenity charges, tirades against fascism, and complaints that he was being denied his right to freedom of speech. He was blacklisted from several clubs in some U.S. cities.

In September 1962, his only visit to Australia caused a media storm, although he was neither banned nor forced to leave the country. He was booked for a two-week engagement at Aaron's Exchange Hotel by American-born, Australia-based promoter Lee Gordon, who was by then deeply in debt, nearing the end of his formerly successful career, and desperate to save his business.

Bruce's first show at 9:00 p.m. on September 6 was uneventful, but his second show at 11:00 p.m. led to major public controversy. Bruce was heckled by audience members, and when local actress Barbara Wyndon stood up and complained that Bruce was only talking about America and asked him to talk about something different, a clearly annoyed Bruce responded, "Fuck you, madam. That's different, isn't it?" Bruce's remark shocked some audience members and several walked out. By the next day, several Sydney papers denounced Bruce as "sick"; one illustrated their story with a retouched photograph appearing to show Bruce giving a fascist salute. The venue owners canceled the rest of Bruce's performances, and he retreated to his Kings Cross hotel room. Local university students (including future OZ magazine editor Richard Neville), who were fans of Bruce's humor, tried to arrange a performance at the Roundhouse at the University of New South Wales, but at the last minute the university's vice-chancellor rescinded permission to use the venue, with no reason given, and an interview Bruce was scheduled to give on Australian television was cancelled by the Australian Broadcasting Commission.

Bruce remained largely confined to his hotel, but eight days later gave his third and last Australian concert at the Wintergarden Theatre in Sydney's eastern suburbs. Although it had a capacity of 2,100, only 200 people attended, including a strong police presence, and Bruce gave what was described as a "subdued" performance. It was long rumored that a tape recording of the historic performance was made by police, but it was in fact recorded by local jazz saxophonist Sid Powell, who brought a portable tape recorder to the show. The tape was rediscovered in 2011 in the possession of Australian singer Sammy Gaha, who had acted as Bruce's chauffeur during his visit. It was subsequently donated to the Lenny Bruce audio collection at Brandeis University. Bruce left Australia a few days later and spoke little about the experience.

Bruce's first performance after the assassination of John F. Kennedy took place at the Village Theater in New York, eight days after the shooting on November 30, 1963. According to Goldman and Jonathan Miller, both of whom were present that night, Bruce opened the show by saying "Wow! Boy! Sssssss! Poor Vaughn Meader", referring to a comedian who had become famous for his Kennedy impersonation. The story has frequently been retold and embellished, with incorrect claims that the performance was the same day as the assassination and that Bruce had said "Vaughn Meader is fucked". Goldman's audiocassette recording of the full performance is in the collections of the Rare Book and Manuscript Library at Columbia University.

Increasing drug use affected Bruce's health and repeated arrests further caused deterioration to his mental health. By 1966, he had been blacklisted by nearly every nightclub in the U.S. as owners feared prosecution for obscenity. He gave a famous performance at the Berkeley Community Theatre in December 1965, which was recorded and became his last live album, The Berkeley Concert. The performance has been described as lucid, clear and calm, and one of his best. His last performance took place on June 25, 1966, at The Fillmore Auditorium in San Francisco, on a bill with Frank Zappa and The Mothers of Invention. The performance was not remembered fondly by Bill Graham, whose memoir describes Bruce as "whacked out on amphetamine"; Graham thought that Bruce finished his set emotionally disturbed. Zappa asked Bruce to sign his draft card, but the suspicious Bruce refused.

At the request of Hefner and with the aid of Paul Krassner, Bruce wrote an autobiography that was serialized in Playboy in 1964 and 1965. It was later published as How to Talk Dirty and Influence People. During this time, Bruce also contributed a number of articles to Krassner's satirical magazine The Realist.

== Death and posthumous pardon ==
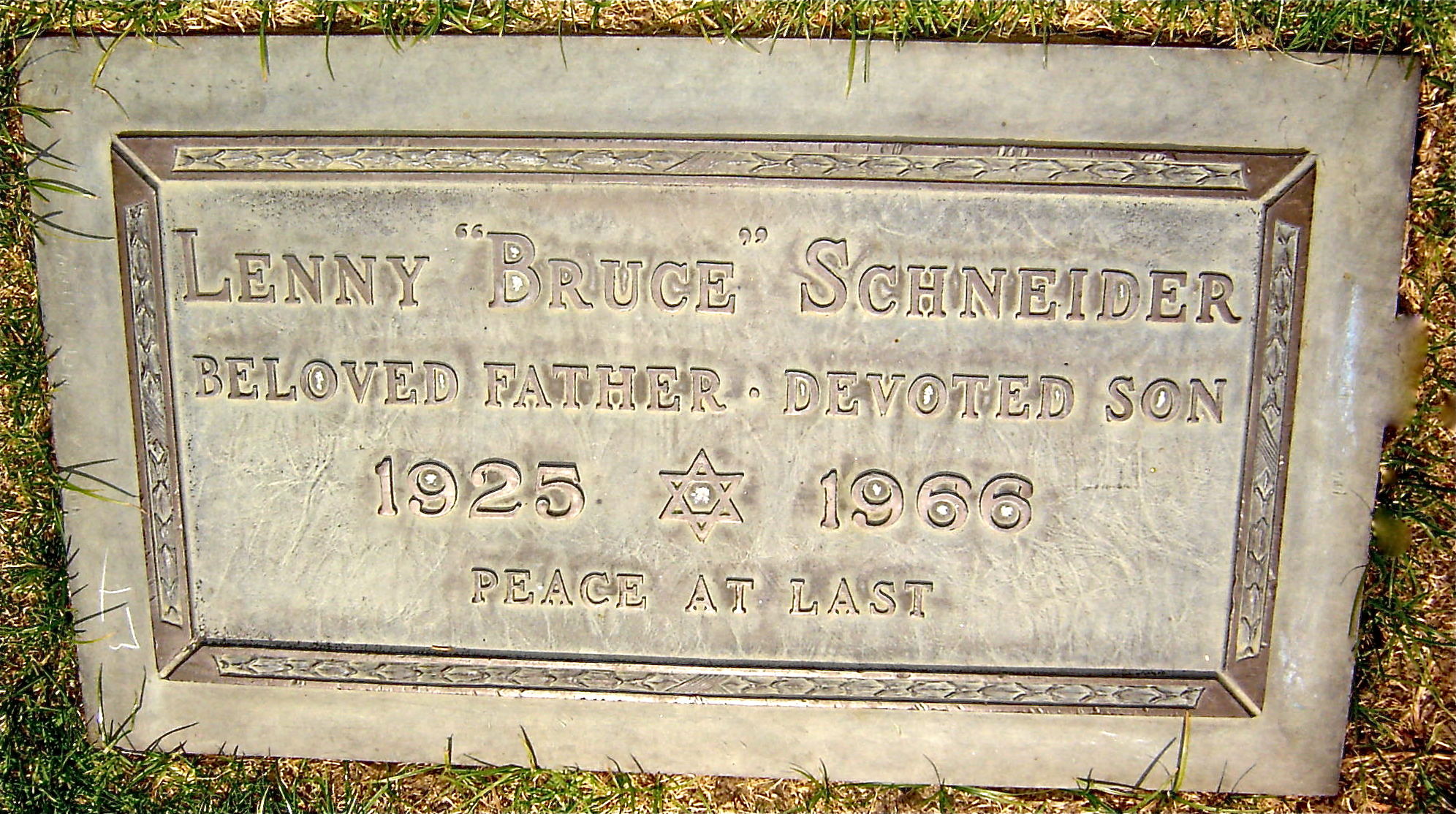
Bruce's grave at Eden Memorial Park Cemetery in Mission Hills, California

On August 3, 1966, Bruce was found dead in the bathroom of his Hollywood Hills home. The official photo taken at the scene showed him lying naked on the floor, a syringe and burned bottle cap nearby, along with other narcotics paraphernalia. Record producer Phil Spector, a friend of Bruce, bought the negatives of the photographs "to keep them from the press". The official cause of death was "acute morphine poisoning caused by an overdose".

Bruce's remains were interred in Eden Memorial Park Cemetery in Mission Hills, California, but an unconventional memorial on August 21 was controversial enough to keep his name in the spotlight. Over 500 people came to the service to pay their respects, led by Spector. Cemetery officials tried to block the ceremony after ads for it encouraged attendees to bring box lunches and noisemakers. Delivering the eulogy, featured at the end of the documentary Lenny Bruce: Without Tears, the Rev. William Glenesk said:

He was in a sense an evangelist, on a street corner. He was a man—up tight against an artificial world ... who shattered its façades, and its hypocrisy, and—if you will pardon the phrase which seems to become a cliché—he saw life as it is.

Bruce's epitaph reads: "Beloved father—devoted son / Peace at last". Dick Schaap concluded his eulogy to Bruce in Playboy with the words: "One last four-letter word for Lenny: Dead. At forty. That's obscene". A memorial event was held at the Judson Memorial Church in New York City on August 12, which was "packed to overflowing" an hour before it was due to get underway. It was attended by prominent members of the arts community, many of whom also performed, and included Allen Ginsberg, Joe Lee Wilson, Jean Shepherd, Charlie Haden, and The Fugs; Paul Krassner officiated. On December 23, 2003, 37 years after Bruce's death, New York Governor George Pataki granted him a posthumous pardon for his obscenity conviction.

== Legacy ==
Perhaps the most profound and cataclysmic change in our popular culture the last few years—matching the "new sound" in music—has been the kind of humor exemplified by the Smothers Brothers, Laugh-In, Woody Allen, and that whole breed, whose secret source of strength was the late dark angel, Lenny Bruce.
Bruce was the Gertrude Stein of comedians. Never popular himself—because he was too cryptic and too scatological for popular taste—he nevertheless influenced a whole generation of comics, just as Stein influenced Hemingway and that generation of writers. Her own work was a dead end (so was Bruce's), but out of that compost grew the buds of a flourishing school.

— Syndicated columnist Sydney J. Harris, November 5, 1969.

Bruce was the subject of the 1974 biographical drama Lenny, directed by Bob Fosse and starring Dustin Hoffman, who was nominated for a Best Actor Academy Award for the role. It was based on the Broadway stage play of the same name by Julian Barry, which starred Cliff Gorman in his 1972 Tony Award-winning role. The main character's editing of a fictionalized film version of Lenny was also a major part of Fosse's own autobiopic, the 1979 Academy Award-nominated All That Jazz, where Gorman again played Bruce.

The documentary film Lenny Bruce: Swear to Tell the Truth (1998), directed by Robert B. Weide and narrated by Robert De Niro, was nominated for the Academy Award for Best Documentary Feature.

Episode 12 of season 1 of Liberty on Trial in America: Cases That Defined Freedom, aired on January 3, 2020, explored the ways in which Bruce and the First Amendment affected each other.

In 2004, Comedy Central placed Bruce at number three on its list of the 100 greatest stand-ups of all time, above Woody Allen (4th) and below Richard Pryor (1st) and George Carlin (2nd). Both comedians who ranked higher than Bruce considered him a major influence. Pryor said that hearing Bruce for the first time "changed my life". Carlin said that Bruce was a "brilliant comedian" who influenced him as much as a man in his moral thinking and attitudes as he did as a comedian. Carlin was arrested with Bruce after refusing to provide identification when police raided a Bruce performance.

== In popular culture ==
- In his 1964 song "Return to Camp Grenada", a sequel to his 1963 hit "Hello Muddah, Hello Fadduh (A Letter from Camp)", comedian and songwriter Allan Sherman mentions an entertainment appearance from Bruce that's been scheduled because "we're all tired of Mother Goose here."
- In 1966, Grace Slick co-wrote and sang the Great Society song "Father Bruce".
- Bruce is pictured in the top row of the cover of the Beatles' 1967 album Sgt. Pepper's Lonely Hearts Club Band.
- The clip of a news broadcast featured in "7 O'Clock News/Silent Night" by Simon & Garfunkel carries the ostensible newscast audio of Bruce's death. In another track on the album Parsley, Sage, Rosemary and Thyme, "A Simple Desultory Philippic (or How I Was Robert McNamara'd into Submission)", Paul Simon sings, "... I learned the truth from Lenny Bruce, that all my wealth won't buy me health."
- Tim Hardin's fourth album, Tim Hardin 3 Live in Concert, released in 1968, includes the song "Lenny's Tune" about his friend Bruce.
- Nico's 1967 album Chelsea Girl includes a track entitled "Eulogy to Lenny Bruce", a version of Hardin's "Lenny's Tune" with the lyrics slightly altered. In it, she describes her sorrow and anger at Bruce's death.
- The Stranglers' 1977 song "No More Heroes" references Lenny Bruce, asking "Whatever happened to dear old Lenny?"
- Genesis's 1974 song "Broadway Melody of 1974" depicts a dystopic New York where "Lenny Bruce declares a truce and plays his other hand, Marshall McLuhan, casual viewin', head buried in the sand" and "Groucho, with his movies trailing, stands alone with his punchline failing."
- John Mayall's 1969 live album The Turning Point opens with the song "The Laws Must Change", featuring the line "Lenny Bruce was trying to tell you many things before he died".
- Bob Dylan's 1981 song "Lenny Bruce", from his Shot of Love album, describes a brief taxi ride the two men shared. In its last line, Dylan recalls: "Lenny Bruce was bad, he was the brother that you never had."
- Phil Ochs wrote a song eulogizing Bruce, "Doesn't Lenny Live Here Anymore?", that is featured on his 1969 album Rehearsals for Retirement.
- Australian group Paul Kelly and the Dots' 1982 album Manila features a track named "Lenny (To Live Is to Burn)", which includes clips of Bruce performing.
- Bruce is pictured (along with Robert Burns, Dylan Thomas, and Truman Capote) on the cover of 1987's Clutching at Straws by the English progressive rock group Marillion.
- R.E.M.'s 1987 song "It's the End of the World as We Know It (And I Feel Fine)" mentions Bruce twice. Its opening line is, "That's great, it starts with an earthquake, birds, snakes and aeroplanes, and Lenny Bruce is not afraid". The third verse refers to a quartet of famous people sharing the initials L.B. (Bruce, Leonard Bernstein, Leonid Brezhnev and Lester Bangs).
- Miami Rock Band Nuclear Valdez wrote & included a song for their 1989 debut album I Am I, titled Unsung Hero (Song for Lenny Bruce) as a tribute to him.
- Bruce appears as a character in Don DeLillo's 1997 novel Underworld, where Bruce does a stand-up routine about the Cuban Missile Crisis.
- Jonathan Larson's musical Rent has a song entitled "La Vie Boheme", mentioning Bruce.
- The Mighty Mighty Bosstones's 2000 album Pay Attention features the track "All Things Considered" that refers to Bruce. "He would introduce us to his closest friend the one and only Lenny Bruce".
- Joy Zipper's 2005 album The Heartlight Set features the track "For Lenny's Own Pleasure".
- Nada Surf's song "Imaginary Friends", from their 2005 album The Weight Is a Gift, refers to Bruce: "Lenny Bruce's bug eyes stare from an LP, asking me just what kind of fight I've got in me."
- Shmaltz Brewing Company brews a year-round beer called Bittersweet Lenny's R.I.P.A., whose marketing line is "Brewed with an obscene amount of hops".
- Metric's song "On the Sly", from their 2007 album Grow Up and Blow Away, says "For Halloween I want to be Lenny Bruce".
- In the 2014 episode "Comic Perversion" of Law & Order: Special Victims Unit, fictional comic Josh Galloway says while being arrested: "I would like to dedicate my arrest to Mr. Lenny Bruce. NYPD crucified him, too."
- A fictionalized version of Bruce is played by Luke Kirby as a recurring character in the Amazon series The Marvelous Mrs. Maisel, where he is portrayed as a friend and champion of the titular character. Kirby won an Emmy for his portrayal in 2019.

== Bibliography ==
- Bruce, Lenny. Stamp Help Out! (Self-published pamphlet, 1962)
- Bruce, Lenny. How to Talk Dirty and Influence People (Playboy Publishing, 1967)
  - Autobiography, released posthumously. Content previously serialized in Playboy magazine.

By others:

- Barry, Julian. Lenny (play) (Grove Press, Inc. 1971)
- Bruce, Honey. Honey: The Life and Loves of Lenny's Shady Lady (Playboy Press, 1976, with Dana Benenson)
- Bruce, Kitty. The (almost) Unpublished Lenny Bruce (1984, Running Press) (includes transcripts of interviews and routines, ephemera, and a graphically spruced up reproduction of Stamp Help Out!)
- Cohen, John, ed., compiler. The Essential Lenny Bruce (Ballantine Books, 1967)
- Collins, Ronald and David Skover, The Trials of Lenny Bruce: The Fall & Rise of an American Icon (Sourcebooks, 2002)
- DeLillo, Don. Underworld, (Simon and Schuster Inc., 1997)
- Denton, Bradley. The Calvin Coolidge Home for Dead Comedians, an award-winning collection of science fiction stories in which the title story has Lenny Bruce as one of the two protagonists.
- Goldman, Albert, with Lawrence Schiller. Ladies and Gentlemen – Lenny Bruce!! (Random House, 1974)
- Goldstein, Jonathan. Lenny Bruce Is Dead (Coach House Press, 2001)
- Josepher, Brian. What the Psychic Saw (Sterlinghouse Publisher, 2005)
- Kofsky, Frank. Lenny Bruce: The Comedian as Social Critic & Secular Moralist (Monad Press, 1974)
- Kringas, Damian. Lenny Bruce: 13 Days In Sydney (Independence Jones Guerilla Press, Sydney, 2010) A study of Bruce's ill-fated September 1962 tour down under.
- Marciniak, Vwadek P., Politics, Humor and the Counterculture: Laughter in the Age of Decay (New York etc., Peter Lang, 2008).
- Marmo, Ronnie. I'm Not a Comedian... I'm Lenny Bruce (written/performed by Marmo, directed by Joe Mantegna, 2017)
- Smith, Valerie Kohler. Lenny (novelization based on the Barry-scripted/Fosse-directed film) (Grove Press, Inc., 1974)
- Thomas, William Karl. Lenny Bruce: The Making of a Prophet Memoir and pictures from Bruce's principal collaborator. First printing, Archon Books, 1989; second printing, Media Maestro, 2002; Japanese edition, DHC Corp. Tokyo, 2001.

== Filmography ==
Year	Title	Role	Notes
1953	Walking My Baby Back Home	Writer	Uncredited
1953	Dance Hall Racket	Vincent	Directed by Phil Tucker
1954	Dream Follies		Directed by Phil Tucker
1954	The Rocket Man	Screenplay	Directed by Oscar Rudolph
1955	The Leather Jacket	Actor / writer	20 minutes of a feature film project that lost funding and was never completed
1959	One Night Stand: The World of Lenny Bruce	Himself / writer	TV special
1967	The Lenny Bruce Performance Film	Himself / writer	Filmed in San Francisco 1966, includes Thank You Mask Man, VHS 1992 / DVD 2005 / download
1971	Thank You Mask Man	Voice of 'The Lone Ranger' / writer / director	Animated short film by John Magnuson Associates
1971	Dynamite Chicken	Himself	Sketch comedy film starring Richard Pryor
1972	Lenny Bruce: Without Tears	Himself	Documentary directed by Fred Baker (director), VHS 1992 / DVD 2005 / download 2013
1974	Lenny	Biography directed by Bob Fosse and starring Dustin Hoffman as Lenny	Hoffman was nominated for: Academy award for Best Actor; BAFTA award for Best Actor in a Leading Role; Golden Globe award for Best Actor – Motion Picture Drama
1984	A Toast to Lenny Bruce	Himself	TV tribute available on LaserDisc / VHS
1998	Lenny Bruce: Swear to Tell the Truth	Himself	Academy award nominated documentary directed by Robert B. Weide, narrated by Robert De Niro
2011	Looking for Lenny	Himself	Documentary featuring interviews with Mort Sahl, Phyllis Diller, Lewis Black, Richard Lewis, Sandra Bernhard, Jonathan Winters, Robert Klein, Shelley Berman and others, North American Premiere Toronto Jewish Film Festival May 2011, screened at Paris Beat Generation Days April 2011

== Discography ==
=== Albums ===
Year	Title	Label	Format	Notes
1958	Interviews of Our Times	Fantasy Records	LP / LP 1969 / CD 1991 / download	2 tracks feature Henry Jacobs & Woody Leifer, liner notes by Horace Sprott III & Sleepy John Estes
1959	The Sick Humor of Lenny Bruce	Fantasy Records	LP / LP / 8-track 1984 / CD 1991, 2012 & 2017 / download 2010	Liner notes by Ralph J. Gleason
1960	I Am Not a Nut, Elect Me! (Togetherness)	Fantasy Records	LP / CD 1991 / download	Liner notes by Ralph J. Gleason
1961	American	Fantasy Records	LP / CD 1991, 2013 & 2016 / download	Liner notes by Ralph J. Gleason
1964	Lenny Bruce Is Out Again	Lenny Bruce	LP / download 2004	Self-published live recordings from 1958 to 1963 / Re-released on vinyl for Record Store Day's September 2020 Drop
1966	Lenny Bruce Is Out Again	Philles Records	LP / download 2004	Totally different version PHLP-4010, produced by Phil Spector

=== Posthumous releases ===
Year	Title	Label	Format	Notes
1966	Why Did Lenny Bruce Die?	Capitol Records	LP / LP 1974 / download 2014	Interviews and recordings by Lawrence Schiller, Lionel Olay and Richard Warren Lewis
1967	Lenny Bruce	United Artists Records	LP / LP 1986	Recorded February 4, 1961, edited, reissued as In Concert At Carnegie Hall
1968	The Essential Lenny Bruce Politics	Douglas Records	LP / download 2007	Clips edited together with archival audio for historical context
1969	The Berkeley Concert	Bizarre Records/Reprise Records	2×LP / 2×LP 1971 / cassette 1991 / CD 1989, 2004 & 2017 / download 2005	Recorded December 12, 1965, produced by John Judnich and Frank Zappa
1970	To Is a Preposition; Come Is a Verb	Douglas Records	LP / LP 1971, 1975 & 2004 / CD 2000 & 2002 / download 2005 & 2007	Recorded 1961–1964, LP reissues titled What I Was Arrested For
1971	Live at the Curran Theater	Fantasy Records	3×LP / 2×CD 1999 & 2017 / download 2006	Recorded November 19, 1961
1972	Carnegie Hall	United Artists Records	3×LP / 2×CD 1995 / download 2015	Recorded February 4, 1961, unabridged
1974	The Law, Language and Lenny Bruce	Warner-Spector Records	LP / cassette	Produced by Phil Spector
1992	Lenny Bruce	Rhino Entertainment	CD / CD 2005	Soundtrack from The Lenny Bruce Performance Film and reissued as Live in San Francisco 1966
1995	Live 1962: Busted!	Viper's Nest Records	CD / download 2010 & 2018	Recorded December 4, 1962 at Chicago Gate of Horn, reissued as Dirty Words – Live 1962 & The Man That Shocked Britain: Gate of Horn, Chicago, December 1962
2004	Let the Buyer Beware	Shout! Factory	6×CD / book	Previously unreleased material, produced by Hal Willner

=== Compilations ===
The later compilations are released in the European Union under various oldies labels, as the content used is public domain in the EU.

Year	Title	Label	Format	Notes
1962	The Best Of Lenny Bruce	Fantasy Records	LP / cassette 1990 / LP 1995	
1972	Thank You Masked Man	Fantasy Records	LP / CD 2004 & 2005	Enhanced CD with Thank You Masked Man short film
1975	The Real Lenny Bruce	Fantasy Records	2×LP	Gatefold with inserts and poster
1982	Unexpurgated : The Best Of Lenny Bruce	Fantasy Records	LP	
1991	The Lenny Bruce Originals Volume 1	Fantasy Records	CD / CD 1992 & 1997 / download 2006 / CD 2013	Reissue of first and second albums
1991	The Lenny Bruce Originals Volume 2	Fantasy Records	CD / CD 1992 & 1997 / download 2006 / CD 2013	Reissue of third and fourth albums
2011	Classic Album Collection	Golden Stars	3×CD 2012	First 4 albums with 4 bonus tracks
2013	Great Audio Moments, Vol. 33: Lenny Bruce	Global Journey	download	22 tracks, 105 minutes
2013	Great Audio Moments, Vol. 33: Lenny Bruce Pt. 1	Global Journey	download	9 tracks, 39 minutes
2013	Great Audio Moments, Vol. 33: Lenny Bruce Pt. 2	Global Journey	download	9 tracks, 43 minutes
2016	Four Classic Albums Plus Bonus Tracks	Real Gone Music	4×CD	First 4 albums with bonus tracks

=== Audiobooks ===
Year	Title	Label	Format	Notes
2000	Shut Your Mouth And Open Your Mind – The Rise & Reckless Fall of Lenny Bruce	Chrome Dreams	CD / CD 2001 & 2005 / CD / download 2006 / CD 2017	Biography read by Robin Clifford, stand up by Lenny and voices of people who knew him.
2002	The Trials of Lenny Bruce	Sourcebooks MediaFusion	CD / book	Features excerpts of Lenny's never-before-released trial tapes
2016	Lenny Bruce: How to Talk Dirty and Influence People: An Autobiography	Hachette Audio	download / CD 2017	Read by Ronnie Marmo, Preface by Lewis Black & Foreword by Howard Reich

=== Tribute albums ===
Year	Title	Label	Format	Notes
1972	Jarl Kulle: Som Lenny Bruce – Varför Gömmer Du Dig I Häcken?	Polar Music	2×LP	Swedish actor performing Lenny, title translates to Like Lenny Bruce – Why are you hiding in the hedge?

== See also ==
- List of civil rights leaders
- Dirtymouth, a 1970 biographical film about Bruce
- Lenny, a 1974 biographical film about Bruce starring Dustin Hoffman
