= Dick Guindon =

American cartoonist (1935–2022)

- Born: Richard Gordon Guindon; December 2, 1935 St. Paul, Minnesota, U.S.
- Died: February 27, 2022 (aged 86) Northport, Michigan, U.S.
- Area: Cartoonist
- Notable works: Guindon

Richard Gordon Guindon (December 2, 1935 – February 27, 2022) was an American cartoonist best known for his gag panel Guindon. Guindon's cartoons appeared in the Minneapolis Tribune, The Realist, and the Detroit Free Press.

== Biography ==
During the late 1950s, Guindon attended the University of Minnesota, where he drew cartoons for The Minnesota Daily, as recalled by Stan Gotlieb:

In the campus newspaper, The Minnesota Daily, a young, brash, twisted and immensely talented cartoonist named Dick Guindon put out social commentary in a Jules Feiffer vein but with more bite. I had first met Guindon when I was still in high school. Some friends took me to a storefront in east Saint Paul, owned by Dick's mother, where he had painted the walls black, put candles in old bottles, and installed a hi-fi and a toaster oven for heating frozen pizza. There, in the Jazz Lab, we were introduced to Dave Brubeck, Chet Baker, Thelonious Monk and other greats of jazz through their LP recordings. Guindon's most ubiquitous cartoon character was a student he called Huggermugger, who went around with bushy hair and a long beard, wearing a lab coat that was held together by a giant safety pin. Huggermugger was an enemy of pretention. I remember one panel where Huggermugger was peacefully eating a bowl of soup in one of the student cafeterias. An undergraduate woman in bohemian attire sits down next to him, and tells him, for the next two panels, how glad she is that he is there; how much she appreciates sharing her space with a kindred spirit, so au-courant, so genteel, so perceptive, just like her. In the final panel, her face showing great dismay, she turns to him and says, "Did you just spit in my soup?"

Living in New York City during the early 1960s, Guindon began contributing to The Nation, Playboy, Esquire and Down Beat. He also drew cartoons for Paul Krassner's The Realist and was associated with Krassner's class at the Free School. Guindon's best-known work from the 1960s was published in The Realist, which included adult-themed references to politics and current events.

Leaving New York, Guindon returned to Minnesota, where Mpls.St.Paul Magazine said in its "Encyclopedia Minnesotica" that Guindon is "Minnesota's greatest satirist".

In 1981, Guindon moved from Minnesota to work in Michigan for the Detroit Free Press, which issued a 1984 datebook, Guindon's Detroit. In May 1984, he made an appearance on The Tonight Show Starring Johnny Carson. He had a three-month art exhibition, "Richard Guindon, 1981–1984", at the Flint Institute of Arts from March 10 to May 26, 1985. The same year, he took an extended vacation, continuing to draw his cartoons while driving around Europe.

Guindon began his self-titled cartoon series for the Minneapolis Tribune in 1974. At first it appeared three to four times per week. It became daily in 1978 when it was picked up by the Los Angeles Times Syndicate. In 1981, the syndication was moved to Field Newspaper Syndicate, and then in 1984 to News America Syndicate. The syndication of the panel appears to have ended in 1985, but the cartoon may have survived as a feature of the Detroit Free Press until later, perhaps 1987.

When he returned to the U.S., Guindon moved to Traverse City, Michigan, in March 1986, and the following August he set up a studio in the Masonic Hall building in downtown Traverse City with a third-floor view of Grand Traverse Bay. Eight months later, the historic four-story building was destroyed by fire. "I've lost 30-some years of work", Guindon said. "It's funny this building should wait 97 years for me to move into it before burning. It really hasn't hit me yet. I think tomorrow is going to be a very grim day." More than 5,000 cartoons and sketches burned in the fire, but a few weeks later Guindon learned that Irv Letofsky, Sunday editor of the Los Angeles Times "Calendar" section, had saved a copy of every Guindon cartoon syndicated over a decade.

In 1988, Guindon broke out of the single-panel mold and began a multi-panel comic strip, The Carp Chronicles, commenting, "Nothing ever works out in Carp City. I don't know why. They're very nice people. It's not a pretty story, but it has to be told."

Guindon announced his retirement in 2005 and lived in Northern Michigan in the village of Suttons Bay in his later years. He died in Northport, Michigan, on February 27, 2022, at the age of 86.

== Bibliography ==
Guindon's cartoons have been collected in several books:

- Guindon (Minneapolis Tribune, 1977),
- Cartoons by Guindon. Putnam's/Quick Fox. 1980. ISBN 978-0-3995-0700-7.
- The World according to Carp. Andrews McMeel. 1983. ISBN 978-0-8362-1214-3.
- Together Again (Andrews McMeel, 1986) ISBN 978-0-8362-2075-9
- Michigan So Far (Detroit Free Press, 2003) ISBN 978-0-9372-4721-1
