= Camp Summerlane =

Former summer camp in North Carolina, US

Camp Summerlane was an integrated ethical humanist summer camp in Western North Carolina founded in 1963 by George von Hilsheimer with the support of Paul Krassner, editor of The Realist. On July 11, 1963, the camp was attacked by an armed mob, which burned down a building and shot out the window of a camp bus, leading to the closure of the camp. In a statement to The Tuscaloosa News, von Hilsheimer asserted that the attack was racially motivated and that, "the only issue the mob was interested in was integration." An article distributed by the Rosman Chamber of Commerce prior to the attack alleged that the camp condoned free love and immorality.
