= Lou Myers =

Lou Myers may refer to:

- Lou Myers (cartoonist) (1915–2005), American cartoonist and short story writer
- Lou Myers (actor) (1935–2013), American actor
