= The Calvin Coolidge Home for Dead Comedians =

1988 novella by Bradley Denton

The Calvin Coolidge Home for Dead Comedians is a weird fiction novella by American writer Bradley Denton. It was first published in Fantasy and Science Fiction, in June 1988. It republished in Denton's 1994 collection The Calvin Coolidge Home for Dead Comedians, and his 1998 collection One Day Closer to Death: Eight Stabs at Immortality; a French translation was published in 1989.

== Plot summary ==
In the afterlife, Leonard finds himself confined to the Calvin Coolidge Home for Dead Comedians, an institution where comedians who were rude, offensive, obscene, and blasphemous are kept until they can learn to shed those elements of their personalities which would make them unfit for Heaven.

== Reception ==
The Calvin Coolidge Home for Dead Comedians was a finalist for the 1989 Hugo Award for Best Novella and the 1989 Nebula Award for Best Novella, and was ranked 9th for the Locus Award for Best Novella.

Jo Walton has described Coolidge as being "terrific" and "memorable and excellent".
