= The Stereo and God =

EP by Joy Zipper
- Released: 2003
- Studio: Brooklyn Recording (Brooklyn, New York)
- Genre: Alternative rock, indie rock, dream pop
- Length: 21:10
- Label: Vertigo; 13 Amp
- Producer: Vincent Cafiso; Tabitha Tindale

Joy Zipper chronology
American Whip (2002)	The Stereo and God (2003)	The Heartlight Set (2005)

The Stereo and God is a mini album by the band Joy Zipper released in 2003.

== Track listing ==
All songs written by Vincent Cafiso, except where noted:

No.	Title	Writer(s)	Length
1.	"If I'm Right"		3:21
2.	"1"		2:28
3.	"Gun Control"	Cafiso, Tabitha Tindale	3:46
4.	"2 Dreams I Had"	Tindale	3:30
5.	"Window"	Tindale	4:24
6.	"Check Out My New Jesus"		3:41
Total length:			21:10

Music video
No.	Title	Length
1.	"If I'm Right"	3:21
