= Joy Zipper (album) =

Studio album by Joy Zipper
- Released: September 20, 1999
- Recorded: 1997–1999
- Genre: Indie, dream pop
- Length: 40:50
- Language: English
- Label: Bar/None Records; Eye Q Records
- Producer: Vincent Cafiso; Tabitha Tindale

Joy Zipper chronology
Joy Zipper (1999)	American Whip (2002)

Singles from Joy Zipper
- 1. "Transformation Fantasy" Released: 1999; 2. "Christine Bonilla" Released: 1999

Professional ratings
Review scores
Source	Rating
AllMusic	4/5 stars
The Encyclopedia of Popular Music	4/5 stars
NME	3.5/5 stars
The Times	9/10

Joy Zipper is the debut album by the New York duo Joy Zipper, released in 1999.

== Production ==
The duo recorded the album over two years, using three different home studios.

== Critical reception ==
AllMusic wrote that "each pensive, dreamy song manages to be part of an intrinsic whole without being redundant." Trouser Press wrote: "Whether the relationship numerology of 'Like 24 (6 + 1 = 3)', Joy Zipper‘s opening track, actually adds up to anything is debatable, but the melody is a gift from the god of Brian Wilson’s teenage symphonies." The Evening Standard called the album "crammed with dream-struck, kooky melodies, rich textures and peaches 'n' cream vocals from Tabitha Tindale swirling gorgeously around Vinny Cafiso's darker tones."

== Track listing ==
All songs written by Vincent Cafiso, except where noted:

No.	Title	Writer(s)	Length
1.	"Like 24 (6+1=3)"		3:55
2.	"Transformation Fantasy"	Cafiso, Tabitha Tindale	3:46
3.	"Check Out My New Jesus"		3:54
4.	"Pillow"		2:56
5.	"Christine Bonilla"	Cafiso, Tindale	3:59
6.	"Pan Moota"		1:31
7.	"Booda"		4:15
8.	"God"		4:43
9.	"Everyday"		6:22
10.	"Apathy"	Cafiso, Tindale	5:29
Total length:			40:50

Bonus track
No.	Title	Length
11.	"The Power of Alan Watts"	4:05
Total length:		44:55
