= How to Talk Dirty and Influence People =

1965 book by Lenny Bruce

- First edition
- Author: Lenny Bruce
- Language: English
- Genre: Autobiography
- Publisher: Playboy Press
- Publication date: 1965

How to Talk Dirty and Influence People is an autobiography by Lenny Bruce, an American satirist and comedian, who died in 1966 at age 40 of a drug overdose.

At the request of Hugh Hefner and with the aid of Paul Krassner, Bruce wrote the work in serialized format for Playboy in 1964 and 1965. Shortly thereafter it was released as a book by Playboy Publishing. The book details the course of his career, which began in the late 1940s. In it, he challenges the sanctity of organized religion and other societal and political conventions he perceives as having hypocritical tendencies. He also chronicles his legal troubles for pushing against the boundaries of free speech. The book's title is a parody of the 1936 bestseller, How to Win Friends and Influence People, by Dale Carnegie.

In a 2021 New York Times list of the nine funniest comedian memoirs, Jason Zinoman included How to Talk Dirty and Influence People, writing that Bruce's book "set the template for the anti-hero comic, cheerily mapping the birth of a rebel, raging against hypocrisy and moralism, mocking the comedy of the previous generation before becoming a free speech martyr, sent to trial for obscenity. It's a masterclass in myth-making." Zinoman added that Bruce's staccato delivery in his stand-up routine "translates beautifully" to the page.
