= The Wilton North Report =

- Genre: Late night newsmagazine/comedy/talk/variety
- Developed by: Fox Television Network
- Written by: Greg Daniels; Conan O'Brien; Billy Kimball; Paul Krassner; Paul Slansky; Danny Zuker; Nell Scovell
- Presented by: Phil Cowan; Paul Robins
- Narrated by: Michael Hanks; Don Morrow
- Country of origin: United States
- No. of seasons: 1
- No. of episodes: 21

Production
- Executive producer: Barry Sand
- Running time: 60 minutes

Original release
- Network: Fox
- Release: December 11, 1987 – January 8, 1988

Related
- The Late Show

The Wilton North Report is a late-night combined newsmagazine, talk show, and variety show that aired on Fox in December 1987 and January 1988. It was Fox's second attempt at a regular late-night show, replacing The Late Show. The series premiered on December 11, 1987, and ended four weeks later, on January 8, 1988. Hosted by Phil Cowan and Paul Robins, the show sought to combine comedy with newsmagazine-style features and serious interviews. Michael Hanks initially served as the show's announcer, with Don Morrow filling that role for its final two weeks.

== Title ==
Barry Sand chose, for a tentative show title, Nightcap, a title Fox felt sounded too similar ABC's late-night newsmagazine Nightline. As a result, the writers came up with about 200 more possible names for the show. The chosen title, The Wilton North Report, was offered by writer Lane Sarasohn, who took the name from the show's studios at the Wilton North Building (then located at the intersection of Sunset Boulevard and North Wilton Place in Los Angeles); Sarasohn believed the title sounded like The MacNeil/Lehrer NewsHour and would reinforce the show's news-oriented approach.

== Format ==
As first conceived, The Wilton North Report's opening segment, which was planned to be its signature segment, would review the day's news using actual footage, then have the hosts comment on it in a funny, hard-hitting fashion. (CBC Television's This Hour Has 22 Minutes and Comedy Central's The Daily Show would follow a similar premise later on.) Before the show's debut, however, producer Barry Sand would eliminate the news segment, believing it didn't mesh with the "friendly" approach of the show's co-hosts, Phil Cowan and Paul Robins. What Wilton North did have at its premiere was a newsmagazine-type show, relying not so much on jokes about current events as on features, interviews, and remote reports (some serious, others not so much), as well as occasional comedy bits and live musical performances. Cowan and Robins would serve as the show's "anchors" and offer their own comments and opinions and segments, with a regular assortment of reporters and commentators alongside them. The cast included interviewers and reporters including Nancy Collins, Greg Jackson, Wayne Satz, and (on health and fitness) Jack LaLanne, along with commentary on the news by staff writer and author/commentator Paul Krassner.

Later in the show's brief run, The Wilton North Report was to completely change its format, reducing its reliance on comedy and moving toward having Cowan and Robins serve as "veejays" in presenting "mini-documentaries" on various real people and events; Paul Krassner would also present and comment on "underground videos" alongside Cowan and Robins.

== Development and production ==
In the spring and summer of 1987, Fox began to develop a replacement for The Late Show, the network's initial, low-rated late night entry. The network, however, was caught somewhat off-guard after giving The Late Show hosting duties to Arsenio Hall, a move that generated some ratings success for the show during the late spring and summer of 1987 and led to a 13-week deal for Hall to remain as Late Show host. Hall would leave Fox and The Late Show after those 13 weeks for other commitments (most notably work on the film Coming to America), eventually returning to late night in 1989 with a syndicated talk show through Paramount Domestic Television.

During Hall's 13-week commitment with The Late Show, Fox would proceed with grooming its replacement, with the network originally approaching Late Night with David Letterman producer Robert Morton to head the project. After David Letterman wanted to keep Morton with his show, Fox instead turned to another Late Night producer, Barry Sand, and offered him the opportunity to produce a Late Night-style show combining talk and offbeat humor; Sand, instead, offered to try something else, eventually going with a news-and-comedy approach. Sand would then assemble a writing staff and choose a tentative show title of Nightcap, before settling on The Wilton North Report

With a writing team in place, Sand would map out a plan for The Wilton North Report that included two hosts and segments based on real, as opposed to fictitious, people and situations. The show's centerpiece segment would be its leadoff feature, a daily review of the day's news events (using actual news footage) in a comical and light-hearted yet still hard-hitting tone. Sand called Wilton North "Siskel & Ebert meet The Today Show," and wanted it to be not only unique but "controversial, opinionated, provocative," not minding if the material would offend people. Sand would also set about searching for hosts for the show, considering not only entertainers but actual journalists for the role; after considering or auditioning various names including comedian Ellen DeGeneres, MTV personality Nina Blackwood, and newscaster Forrest Sawyer, Sand settled on Phil Cowan and Paul Robins, a Sacramento morning drive-time disc jockey team who came in with a limited amount of television experience; Cowan and Robins were hired a mere 10 days before Wilton North's scheduled debut on November 30, 1987.

Almost from the outset, creative differences occurred between The Wilton North Report's writing team, Sand, and Cowan and Robins. The hosts thought the writers' material was too sophisticated for mass audiences and frequently not very funny; the writers thought Cowan and Robins were less than erudite and felt uncomfortable writing for them. Sand tried to make peace between the hosts and writers, seeking material that Cowan and Robins would feel comfortable with, yet encouraging the hosts to tone down their shrill delivery. Pre-debut rehearsals did not impress Sand nor Fox executives, who decided on November 29 to push back Wilton North's premiere, which had been scheduled for the next night, to allow the crew extra time to gel (the hosts and writers had been together for not even a week). The delay also meant a retooling of the show, beginning with Sand's scrapping of the opening news review segment; Sand believed it did not mesh with Cowan and Robin's friendly approach, while Fox objected to its crude humor.

By the time Wilton North did finally reach the air on December 11, its own cast and crew would have difficulty articulating what the show was even trying to do. While the show did feature comedy segments and musical performances (the group Squeeze made one such musical appearance), the emphasis was placed on interviews and features, among them a visit to an alligator farm, a woman who claimed that her toaster was possessed by demons, and a sit-down interview Nancy Collins conducted with Andrea Hart, the daughter of Presidential candidate Gary Hart. The on-air product was met with general derision from critics; Clifford Terry of the Chicago Tribune said the show took a smug, studious approach to its subject material, while Ken Tucker of the Philadelphia Inquirer thought the "video version of Spy magazine" lacked "genuinely amusing rudeness."

Later episodes of Wilton North would see a greater reliance on long-form videos and feature reporting, with such examples including a report presented by Aron Ranen on a dominatrix that specialized in corporal punishment, as well as a feature on a high school basketball team in South Carolina that hadn't won a game in five years (though they pulled off a win when a Wilton North crew filmed them in action). The idea was to have Cowan and Robins generally serve as presenters and offer comments on what was being shown. Staff writer and commentator Paul Krassner would also be on hand to introduce and discuss "underground videos" with the hosts. Krassner, in what he would later term a "practice" segment, discussed the highlights of 1987 with Cowan and Robins on the January 1 broadcast, with the possibility that such analyses would become permanent the following week (a possibility Krassner was thrilled about doing, as he would recall in a February 1988 Los Angeles Times piece about his time at Wilton North). By this time, however, Fox's affiliates grew restless and demanded that the show be cancelled immediately; Fox would announce Wilton North's cancellation on January 5, 1988, with network president Jamie Kellner calling the show "a bit too ambitious." The show's 21st and final episode would air on January 8.

== Aftermath ==
After The Wilton North Report was cancelled, reruns of The Late Show were inserted in Fox's late night time slot, with the network scrambling to revive the show. Original Late Show broadcasts would later commence with a variety of guest hosts, with Fox eventually settling on Ross Shafer as permanent host. The Late Show would leave the air again in October 1988, with Fox giving the late night slot back to its affiliates. Fox's only other attempt at a weeknight late night show would be The Chevy Chase Show, which had its own brief run in September and October 1993.
