= American Whip =

Studio album by Joy Zipper
- Released: 2002
- Genres: Dream pop; shoegaze; indie pop
- Length: 41:40
- Language: English
- Label: 13 Amp Recordings
- Producers: Vincent Cafiso; Tabitha Tindale

Joy Zipper chronology
| Joy Zipper (1999) | American Whip (2002) | The Stereo and God (2003) |

Singles from American Whip
- 1. "Ron" Released: 2002; 2. "Baby You Should Know" Released: 2004; 3. "Out of the Sun" Released: 2004

American Whip is the second album by the New York dream pop duo Joy Zipper released in 2002.

== Track listing ==
All songs written by Vincent Cafiso, except where noted.

| No. | Title | Writer(s) | Length |
|---|---|---|---|
| 1. | "Sunstroke" | | 1:00 |
| 2. | "Christmas Song" | | 3:39 |
| 3. | "Baby You Should Know" | Tabitha Tindale | 4:31 |
| 4. | "33x" | | 3:25 |
| 5. | "Out of the Sun" | Cafiso, Tindale | 4:29 |
| 6. | "Drugs" | | 0:24 |
| 7. | "Dosed and Became Invisible" | | 4:16 |
| 8. | "Alzheimers" | | 4:32 |
| 9. | "Ron" | | 3:37 |
| 10. | "In the Never Ending Search for a Suitable Enemy" | | 6:19 |
| 11. | "VSX" | Cafiso, Tindale | 0:53 |
| 12. | "Valley Stream" | Cafiso, Tindale | 4:35 |
| Total length: | | | 41:40 |

== Critical reaction ==
Professional ratings
Review scores
| Source | Rating |
|---|---|
| AllMusic | 4/5 stars |
| The Guardian | 4/5 stars |
| Uncut | 2/5 stars |
| RTÉ | 3/5 stars |
| Slant Magazine | 3.5/5 stars |
| Pitchfork | 7.5/10 |
| IGN | 8.5/10 |
| PopMatters | 8/10 |
| Drowned in Sound | 5/10 |

The BBC's Richard Banks praised "charming melodies, heart-melting harmonies and hazy lo-fi guitars" forming "an intoxicating alt-pop nectar", noting a formula little-changed from their first album. He also discerned a darker side beneath the "saccharine" surface. Pitchfork rated it 7.5/10, calling it "engaging and sharply-drawn", rejecting deeper meanings. IGN gave it 8.5/10.

Drowned in Sound scored it 5/10, saying "Joy Zipper are the type of band that think shrouding their songs in a sheet of sub-Kevin Shields drone, drugged-up affectations and bastardised Bacharach melodies makes their pedestrian pop sound urgent, vital and 'edgy.' It doesn't." Uncut called it a new My Bloody Valentine album in all but name, scoring it 4/10.
