= The Heartlight Set =

Studio album by Joy Zipper
- Released: 2004
- Studio: Vintab NYC (New York City), Helioscentric Studios (Peasmarsh); Brooklyn Recording (New York City)
- Genre: Alternative rock, indie rock, dream pop
- Length: 41:21
- Label: Vertigo
- Producer: Vincent Cafiso; Tabitha Tindale; Kramer

Joy Zipper chronology
The Stereo and God (2003)	The Heartlight Set (2004)

Singles from The Heartlight Set
- 1. "You're So Good" Released: 2005; 2. "1" Released: 2005

The Heartlight Set is a studio album by the indie rock band Joy Zipper. It was released in 2004 on Vertigo Records.

Professional ratings
Review scores
Source	Rating
AllMusic	4/5 stars
RTÉ	3/5 stars
God Is in the TV	3/5 stars
Gigwise	3.5/5 stars
Pitchfork	6.7/10
Drowned in Sound	7/10

== Track listing ==
All songs written by Vincent Cafiso, except where noted:

No.	Title	Writer(s)	Length
1.	"Go Tell the World"		2:04
2.	"1"		2:34
3.	"Thought's a Waste of Time"		4:02
4.	"You're So Good"	Cafiso, Tabitha Tindale	3:44
5.	"Anything You Sent"	Cafiso, Tindale	2:48
6.	"No Time, Pt. 1"		0:39
7.	"For Lenny's Own Pleasure"		2:46
8.	"You Run the Game"		3:29
9.	"Window"	Tindale	3:41
10.	"2 Dreams I Had"	Tindale	3:24
11.	"World Doesn't Care"		3:49
12.	"Rockdove"	Cafiso, Tindale	3:30
13.	"Holy Diver"		4:51
Total length:			41:21
