= The Realist =

American satirical magazine

- Editor: Paul Krassner
- Categories: Satirical Magazine, Yippies
- Frequency: Monthly
- Publisher: Realist Association
- First issue: Spring 1958
- Final issue Number: Spring 2001; 146
- Country: USA
- Based in: New York City, New York
- Language: English
- OCLC: 1105249849

The Realist was an American magazine published between 1958 and 2001. It offered "social-political-religious criticism and satire", and was intended to be a hybrid of a grown-up's version of Mad and Lyle Stuart's anti-censorship monthly The Independent. Edited and published by Paul Krassner, and often regarded as a milestone in the American underground or countercultural press of the mid-20th century, it was a nationally-distributed newsstand publication as early as 1958. Publication was discontinued in 2001.

== History ==
First published in the spring of 1958 in New York City in the offices of Mad, The Realist appeared on a fairly regular schedule during the 1960s and then on an irregular schedule after the early 1970s. In 1984, it was revived as a much smaller newsletter. Articles and cartoons from the magazine were collected in a book, The Best of the Realist (Running Press, 1984). The final issue of The Realist was #146 (Spring 2001).

The Realist provided a format for extreme satire in its articles, cartoons and Krassner's editorials, but it also carried more traditionally serious material in articles and interviews. The magazine also published political commentary from Norman Mailer, Ken Kesey and Joseph Heller.

=== Hoaxes and advertising ===
==== Masquerade Party ====
The first hoax directed toward mainstream culture involved the 1960 edition of the NBC show Masquerade Party. Typically, television network executives would react swiftly and fearfully to viewer complaints, no matter how small or unjustified the viewer response. Testing this premise, angry letters containing no specific complaints at all were sent in response to a particular episode of the innocuous game show.

==== Bumper sticker ====
Among the more successful productions issued by Krassner was a red, white, and blue automobile bumper sticker, decorated with stars, which proclaimed "Fuck Communism". In advertising this item, Krassner advised that if anyone displaying the sticker received criticism, the critic should be told, "Go back to Russia, you Commie lover."

==== Disneyland Memorial Orgy poster ====
The Disneyland Memorial Orgy poster, first published May 1967

His Disneyland Memorial Orgy poster, illustrated by Wally Wood and published in the May 1967 issue, was a highlight of the magazine, so successful that Krassner printed it as a poster that was widely pirated. The poster has been upgraded by Krassner into a new, digitally-colored version.

A section of the image on the left shows Snow White being sexually assaulted by five of the seven dwarfs whilst the other two engage in anal sex nearby. This scene has been printed (often modified to be more explicit) on t-shirts and worn by punks with the title Snow White and the Sir Punks, which have caused some offence.

Other cartoonists featured in The Realist included Howard Shoemaker, Dick Guindon, Mort Gerberg, Bhob Stewart, Jonathan Richards and Lou Myers.

==== "The Parts That Were Left Out of the Kennedy Book" ====
Krassner's most successful prank was The Parts That Were Left Out of the Kennedy Book, a grotesque article following the censorship of William Manchester's book on the Kennedy assassination, The Death of a President. At the climax of the short story, Lyndon B. Johnson is on Air Force One sexually penetrating the bullet-hole wound in the throat of JFK's corpse. Krassner acknowledged Marvin Garson, editor of the San Francisco Express Times and husband of Barbara Garson (author of the notorious anti-Johnson play MacBird!), for coming up with that surreal image. According to Elliot Feldman, "Some members of the mainstream press and other Washington political wonks, including Daniel Ellsberg of Pentagon Papers fame, actually believed this incident to be true." In a 1995 interview for the magazine Adbusters, Krassner commented: "People across the country believed – if only for a moment – that an act of presidential necrophilia had taken place. It worked because Jackie Kennedy had created so much curiosity by censoring the book she authorized – William Manchester's The Death of a President – because what I wrote was a metaphorical truth about LBJ's personality presented in a literary context, and because the imagery was so shocking, it broke through the notion that the war in Vietnam was being conducted by sane men."

In 1967, the Canadian campus newspaper The McGill Daily published an excerpt from Krassner's story. The Montreal police confiscated the issue and Rocke Robertson, principal of McGill University, charged student John Fekete, the supplement editor responsible for the publication, before the Senate Discipline Committee.

=== Conspiracy theories ===
The Realist was the first satirical magazine to publish conspiracy theories. It was the first magazine to carry Mae Brussell's work on conspiracies, which covered the kidnapping of Patty Hearst, the Watergate scandal, the assassination of JFK and other conspiracy theories.

When the magazine ran into financial difficulties in the 1970s, it was the conspiracy theory element that attracted ex-Beatle John Lennon to donate; saying, "If anything ever happens to me...it won't be an accident."

== Cultural influence ==
In 2003, Italian satirist Daniele Luttazzi, whose production company is called "Krassner Entertainment", wrote the short story Stanotte e per sempre (Eng.: Tonight and forever) about the assassination of Italian politician Aldo Moro. In the climax scene, Giulio Andreotti penetrates the bullet wounds in Aldo Moro's corpse.

Lewis Black included an excerpt, precisely the final part, from Krassner's story in his 2005 book Nothing's Sacred.

== Notable contributors ==
Notable contributors include:

- Paul Krassner
- Mae Brussell
- Mort Sahl
- Lenny Bruce
- Terry Southern
- Ken Kesey
- Richard Pryor
- Joseph Heller
- Woody Allen
- Jules Feiffer
- Dick Guindon
- Herb Gardner
- Garrett Hardin
- Norman Mailer
- Vivian McPeak
- Robert Anton Wilson
- Robert Crumb
- Garry Trudeau
- Harry Shearer
- Jean Shepherd
- Jerry Rubin
- Abbie Hoffman
- Nicholas Kazan
- Bruce Jay Friedman
- Wally Wood
- Mort Gerberg
- Bhob Stewart
- Lou Myers
- Phil Ochs
- Albert Ellis
- Neil Postman
- Madalyn Murray O'Hair
- Tad Richards
- Edward Sorel
- Alan Watts
