= Lou Myers (cartoonist) =

Cartoonist and short story writer

Lou Myers (1915 – November 20, 2005) was a cartoonist and short story writer.

He was the first person since James Thurber to contribute both cartoons and articles to The New Yorker. His work has also appeared in The New York Times, The Nation, Esquire, Playboy, Penthouse, The Realist and Mother Jones.
