= Joy Zipper =

American indie pop band

- Origin: New York, New York, United States
- Genres: Indie; Alternative; Dream Pop
- Members: Vincent Cafiso; Tabitha Tindale

Joy Zipper is an American indie pop duo from Long Island, New York, made up of Tabitha Tindale and Vincent Cafiso, who are also a married couple. The duo has been playing dream pop since the late 1990s. The band is named for Tindale's mother.

Their songs are underpinned with darker scarred lyrics (suggested in interviews to have been inspired by the death of Cafiso's father) causing them to be famously compared to, 'a candy apple with a razor blade inside'.

Musical influences of the band vary from 1960s rock outfits The Beatles, The Velvet Underground and most associated, The Beach Boys, to early 1990s noise rock pioneers My Bloody Valentine, and The Breeders.

== Albums ==
Joy Zipper (Eponymous LP)

Joy Zipper's first album was recorded at home on an 8-track in 1999 and was first released in the UK on EyeQ Records that same year. In 2000 it was released on US label Bar/None Records (Yo La Tengo, Of Montreal, Alex Chilton). The single Christine Bonilla was featured on Another Late Night: Zero 7.

American Whip

Joy Zipper's second album, American Whip was co-produced and mixed with Kevin Shields (My Bloody Valentine) and DJ/Producer David Holmes (Oceans 11, Out of Site). The recording was started at Cava Studios in Glasgow, Scotland with Tony Doogan ( Belle & Sebastian, Snow Patrol, Mogwai). Mick Cooke of Belle & Sebastian played Flugelhorn on a number of the songs. Joey Waronker (Beck, R.E.M.) played the drums on American Whip which were recorded at George Martin's AIR Studios in London by David Holmes. The album was mixed at Ray Davies' Konk studio in Hornsey and The Dairy studio in Brixton with Kevin Shields and Guy Fixsen (Laika). It was released on Vertigo/Mercury Records in 2003 and in America on Dangerbird Records in 2005.

In December 2019 The Guardian newspaper listed Christmas Song as one of the 50 Greatest Christmas songs.

The Stereo and God (Mini LP)

The Stereo and God was co-produced and recorded by Kramer (Galaxie 500, Danielson Famile, Daniel Johnston). It was recorded in 9 days at Brooklyn Recording in 2003 and formed the band's first release on Vertigo/Mercury Records in the UK.

The Heartlight Set

Released in the UK in 2005 and recorded at Heliocentric Studio in Peasmarsh, England. Mixed with Guy Fixsen at Eden Studio, London. Songs 1 and Go Tell the World have been used extensively in television shows and commercials around the world.

== Television ==
The single "Baby You Should Know" has been featured on Fox Television's The O.C., and "Go Tell the World" was featured in ads for Nike Soccer and Homegoods, in a season two episode of Grey's Anatomy, season 1 of Lifetime's Army Wives, NBC's Windfall, Google 100 for 100 campaign and Cartier Panthere Campaign. The single "1" has been featured on Cigna's "Go You" TV commercial and in season 3 of WB Network's One Tree Hill. "Christmas Song" was used for an AMC channel promo and "You're So Good" for an A&E Network promo. Joy Zipper's cover of "Just Like Heaven" was featured in Grey's Anatomy season 10, episode 15.

== Cover songs ==
Joy Zipper covered the Pixies' "Wave Of Mutilation" for the American Laundromat Records compilation album, Dig For Fire - a tribute to Pixies (2007). In 2008, Joy Zipper covered the title track for the American Laundromat Records produced Cure tribute album, Just Like Heaven - a tribute to The Cure. The Wedding Present, The Submarines, Dean & Britta and Tanya Donelly also appeared on the project. In 2011 they recorded a cover version of "What Difference Does It Make" by The Smiths

== Live performances ==
The band did promotional tours in the Europe for all three albums and supported Air in Europe and Phoenix in North America. Joy Zipper has also supported Luna and Franz Ferdinand.

Past live band members have included: Dan Donnelly, Bryce Dessner (The National), Aaron Dessner (The National), Bryan Devendorf (The National), Joshua Wheeler, Charles Ranaudo, Howard Monk, Crick Dinerman, and Adrian Henke.

== Discography ==
=== Albums ===
- Joy Zipper (Bar/None Records) (1999)
- American Whip (2002)
- The Heartlight Set (2005)

=== EPs ===
- The Stereo and God (2003)

=== Singles ===
- (1999) Transformation Fantasy (Transformation Fantasy / The Power Of Alan Watts - Eye Q Records)
- (1999) Christine Bonilla (Christine Bonilla / Booda 94 (Warding Off Death) / Happy Birthday - Eye Q Records)
- (2002) Ron (Ron / Absent Father - 13 Amp Records)
- (2002) Gun Control (Christmas Song / Gun Control / Moonmoonmoon - 13 Amp Records)
- (2003) Christmas Song (Christmas Song / Hitsville UK - Vertigo Records)
- (2003) Sampler (Christina Bonilla / Check Out My New Jesus / Dosed & Became Invisible / 33 X - Vertigo Records)
- (2004) Baby You Should Know (Baby You Should Know / Out Of The Sun (Schneider TM 'I Love The Sun' Mix) - Vertigo Records)
- (2004) Out Of The Sun (Out Of The Sun / Dosed And Became Invisible / Drugs (Simian Remix) - Vertigo Records)
- (2005) You're So Good (You're So Good / Rockdove - Vertigo Records)
- (2005) 1 (1 / Last July - Vertigo Records)

=== Compilations ===
- Another Late Night- Zero 7 (2002 - Christine Bonilla - Kinetic Records)
- White Riot Volume 2 Tribute to the Clash (2003 - Hitsville UK - Uncut Magazine
- Ministry of Sound: Late Night Sessions (2003 - Transformation Fantasy - Ministry of Sound
- The Trip created by Snow Patrol (2004 - Christmas Song - Universal Records)
- Colette N°7 (2005 - Go Tell The World - Colette Paris)

=== Appearances ===
- Dig For Fire - A Tribute To Pixies (2007 - Wave Of Mutilation - American Laundromat Records)
- Just Like Heaven - A Tribute To The Cure (2007 - Just Like Heaven - American Laundromat Records)
- Please Please Please - A Tribute To The Smiths (2011 - What Difference Does It Make? - American Laundromat Records)
