= Hanuman =

Hindu god, companion of the god Rama

- God of wisdom, strength, courage, devotion and self-discipline
- Member of Chiranjivi
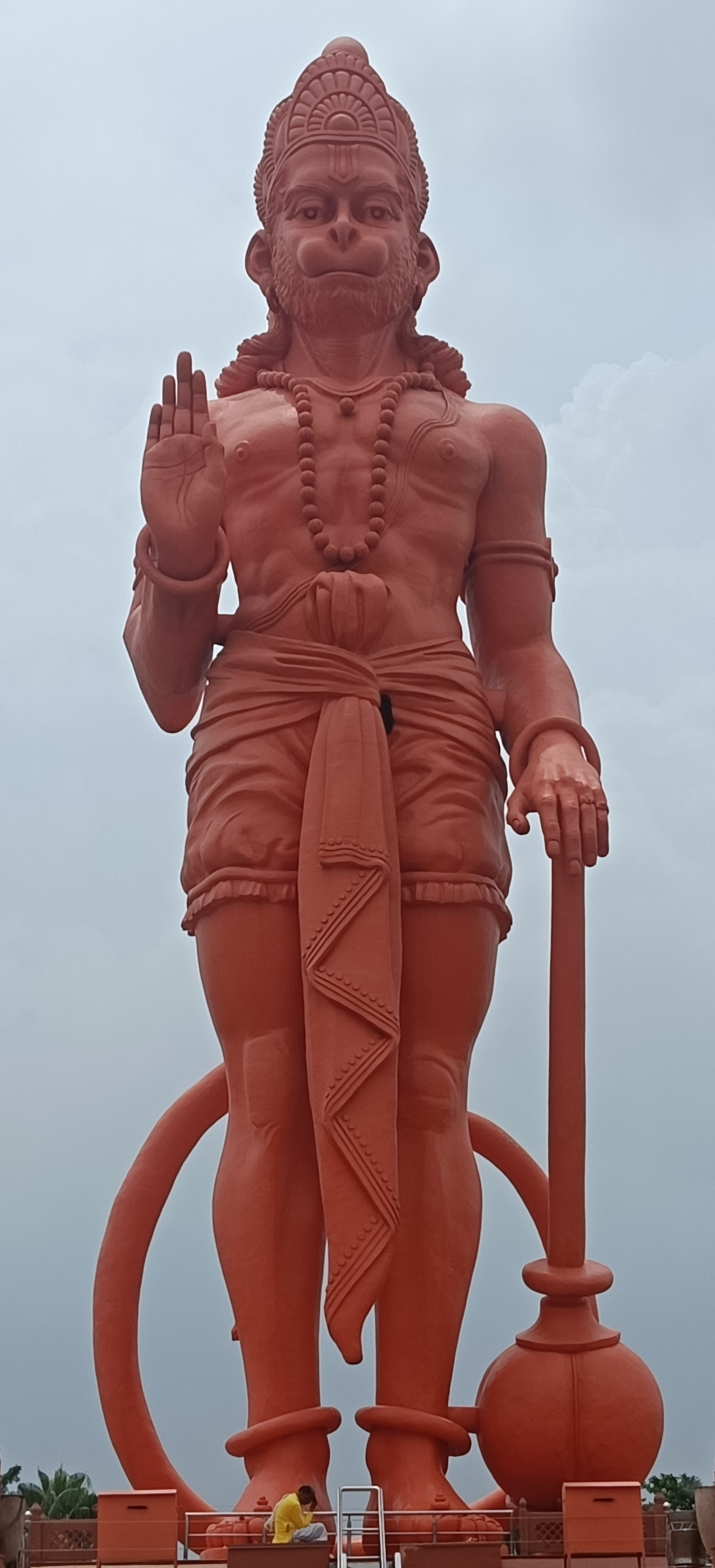
- Hanuman statue at Sidhheshwar Temple, Chhindwara, India
- Affiliation: Rama devotee, Deva, Chiranjivi, Vanara, avatar of Shiva (Shaivism), son and avatar of Vayu (Vaishnavism).
- Abode: Kishkindha
- Mantra: Oṁ Śrī Hanumate Namaḥ
- Weapon: Gada (mace)
- Day: Saturday; Tuesday
- Texts: Hanuman Chalisa; Ramayana and its other versions
- Festivals: Hanuman Jayanti; Dipavali

Genealogy
- Parents: Vayu (spiritual father); Kesari (father); Añjanā (mother)
- Siblings: Matiman, Shrutiman, Ketuman, Gatiman and Dhritiman (brothers)

Hanuman (/ˈhʌnʊˌmɑːn/; Sanskrit: हनुमान्, IAST: Hanumān), also known as Maruti, Bajrangabali, and Anjaneya, is a deity in Hinduism, revered as a divine vanara, and a devoted companion of Lord Rama. Central to the Ramayana, Hanuman is celebrated for his unwavering devotion to Rama and is considered a chiranjivi. He is traditionally believed to be the spiritual offspring of the celestial wind-god Vayu. In Shaiva tradition, he is regarded as an incarnation of Shiva, while in most of the Vaishnava traditions he is the son and incarnation of Vayu. His tales are recounted not only in the Ramayana but also in the Mahabharata and various Puranas. Devotional practices centred on Hanuman were not prominent in these texts or in early archaeological evidence. His theological significance and the cultivation of a devoted following emerged roughly a millennium after the Ramayana was composed, during the second millennium CE.

In the medieval Bhakti movement, figures such as Samarth Ramdas have portrayed Hanuman as an emblem of nationalism and defiance against oppression. According to Vaishnava tradition, the sage Madhvacharya posited that Vayu aids Vishnu in his earthly incarnations, a role akin to Hanuman's assistance to Rama. In recent times, the veneration of Hanuman through iconography and temple worship has significantly increased. He epitomizes the fusion of "strength, heroic initiative, and assertive excellence" with "loving, emotional devotion" to his Lord Rama, embodying both Shakti and Bhakti. Subsequent literature has occasionally depicted him as the patron deity of martial arts, meditation, and scholarly pursuits. He is revered as an exemplar of self-control, faith, and commitment to a cause and his physical attributes as a Vanara for which he is worshipped. Traditionally, Hanuman is celebrated as a lifelong celibate, embodying the virtues of chastity. Hanuman's abilities are attributed in part to his lineage from Vayu, reflecting the wind god’s role as both a vital force within the body and a cosmic principle.

== Names and etymology ==
The meaning or origin of the word "Hanuman" is unclear. In the Hindu pantheon, deities typically have many synonymous names, each based on some noble characteristic, attribute, or reminder of a deed achieved by that deity. One interpretation of "Hanuman" is "one having a disfigured jaw". This version is supported by a Puranic tale wherein infant Hanuman mistakes the Sun for a fruit, heroically attempts to reach it, and is wounded in the jaw for his attempt by Indra the King of gods.

Hanuman combines two of the most cherished traits in the Hindu bhakti-shakti worship traditions: "heroic, strong, assertive excellence" and "loving, selfless devotion to personal God".

Linguistic variations of "Hanuman" include Hanumat, Anuman (Tamil), Hanumantha (Kannada), Hanumanthudu (Telugu). Other names include:

- Anjaneya, Anjaniputra (Kannada), Anjaneyar (Tamil), Anjaneyudu or Anjaneyulu (Telugu), Anjanisuta all meaning "the son of Anjana"
- Kesari Nandana or Kesarisuta, based on his father, which means "son of Kesari"
- Vayuputra/ Pavanputra : the son of the Vayu deva- wind god
- Vajrang Bali/Bajrang Bali, "the strong one (bali), who had limbs (anga) as hard or as tough as vajra (diamond)"; this name is widely used in rural North India
- Sankata Mochana, "the remover of dangers, hardships, or hurdles" (sankata)
- Māruti, "son of Maruta" (another name of Vayu deva)
- Kapeeshwara, "lord of monkeys."
- Rama Doota, "the messenger (doota) of Rama"
- Mahakaya, "gigantic"
- Vira, Mahavira, "most valiant"
- Mahabala/Mahabali, "the strongest one"
- Vanarkulathin Thondaiman, "descendant of the Vanar clan" (Tamil)
- Panchavaktra, "five-faced"
- Mukhya Prana Devaru, "Primordial Life Giver" (more prominent amongst followers of Dvaita Vedanta, such as Madhva Brahmin)

== Historical development ==
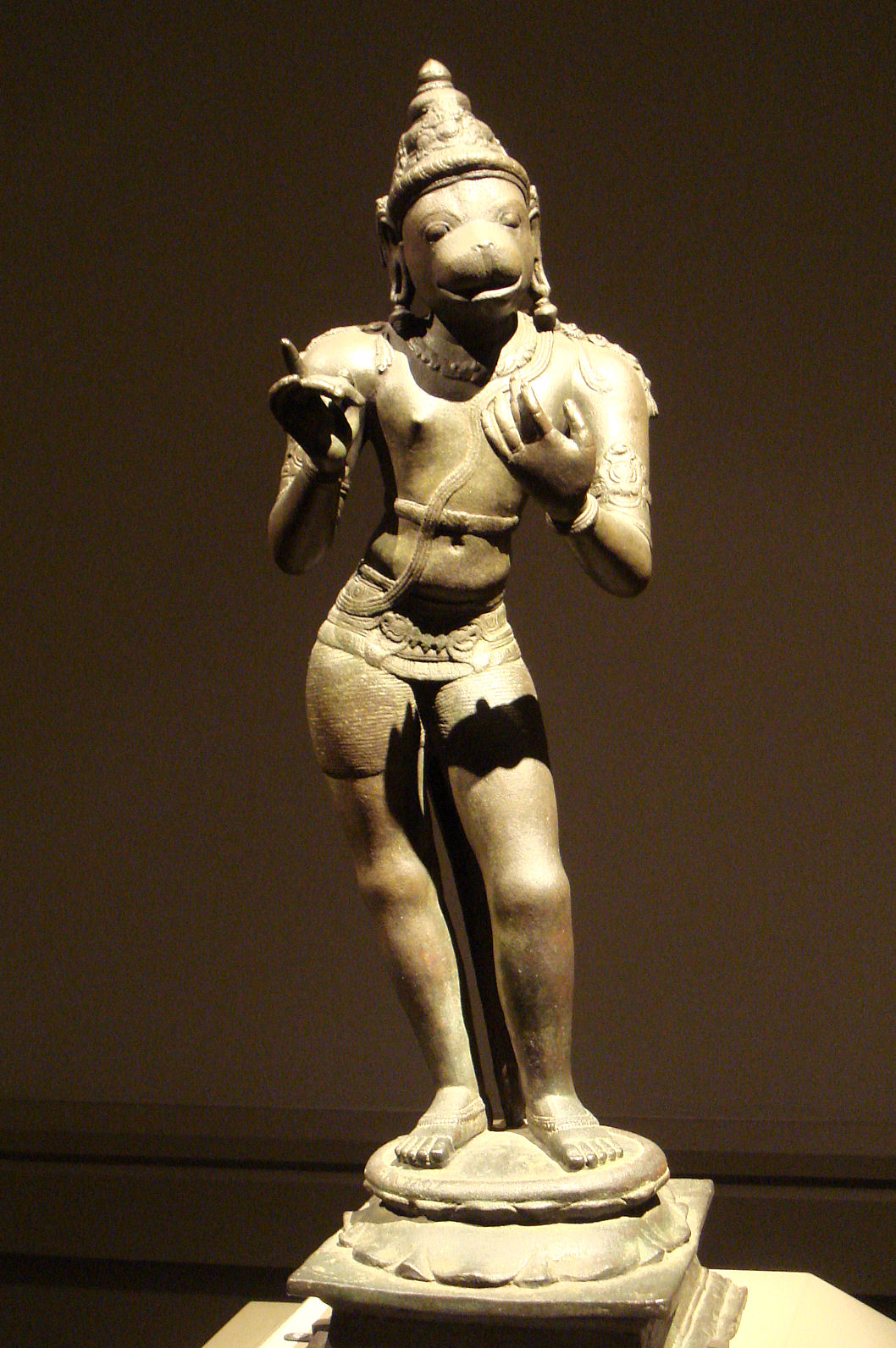
Standing Hanuman, Chola dynasty, 11th century, Tamil Nadu, India

=== Vedic roots ===
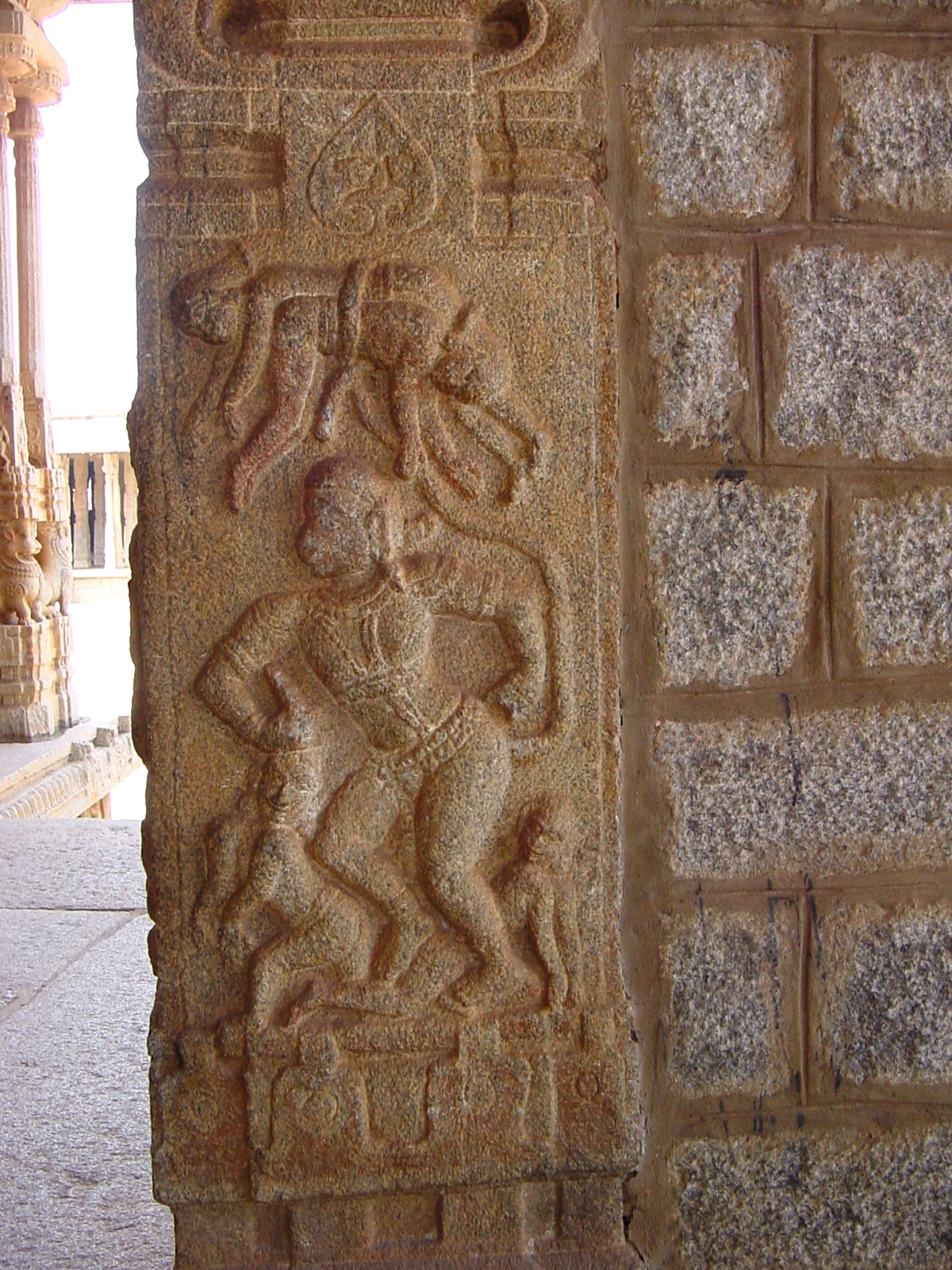
Numerous 14th-century and later Hanuman images are found in the ruins of the Hindu Vijayanagara Empire.

The earliest mention of a divine monkey is in hymn 10.86 of the Rigveda, dated to between 1500 and 1200 BCE. The twenty-three verses of the hymn are a metaphorical and riddle-filled tale. It is presented as a dialogue between multiple figures: the god Indra, his wife Indrani and an energetic monkey it refers to as Vrisakapi and his wife Kapi.

=== Epics and Puranas ===
Sita's scepticism

Vanaranam naranam ca
kathamasit samagamah

Translation:
How can there be a
relationship between men and monkeys?

— Valmiki's Ramayana'
Sita's first meeting with Hanuman
(Translator: Philip Lutgendorf)

Hanuman is mentioned in both the Hindu epics, Ramayana and Mahabharata.

Hanuman is mentioned in the Puranas. The Shiva Purana mentions Hanuman as an avatar of Shiva; all other Puranas and scriptures mention him as the spiritual son of Vayu, an incarnation of Vayu, or sometimes an avatar of Rudra (another name of Vayu). Commonly, Hanuman is not related to Shiva in Vaishnava traditions but is known as Shiva's avatar or son in Shaiva traditions.

Other texts, such as those found in South India, present Hanuman as a being who is the union of Shiva and Vishnu, or associated with the origin of Ayyappa. The 17th century Odia work Rasavinoda by Dinakrishnadasa goes on to mention that the three gods – Brahma, Vishnu and Shiva – combined to take the form of Hanuman.

=== Late medieval and modern era ===
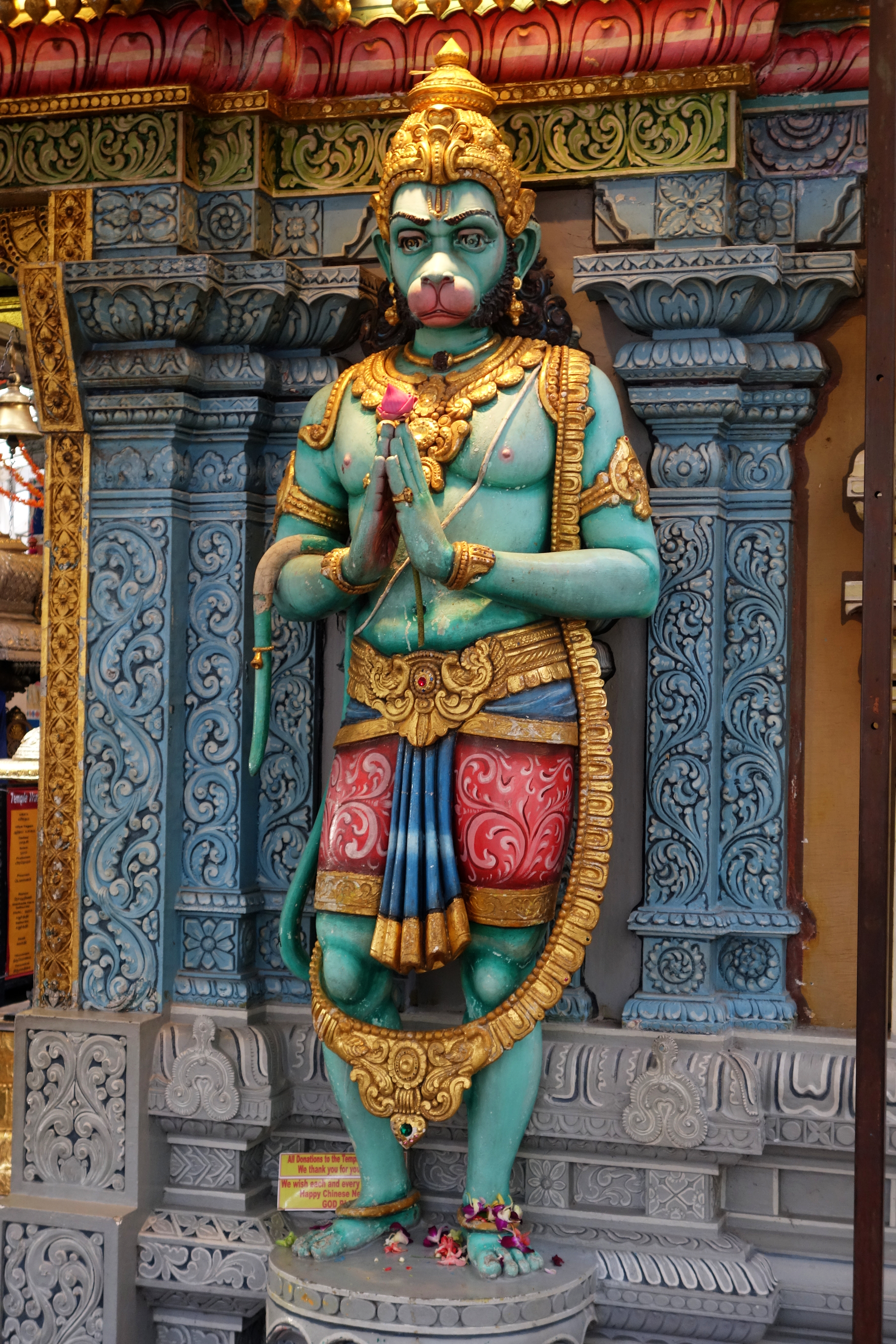
Hanuman with a Namaste (Anjali Mudra) posture

In Valmiki's Ramayana, estimated to have been composed before or in about the 3rd century BCE, Hanuman is an important, creative figure as a simian helper and messenger for Rama. It is, however, in the late medieval era that his profile evolves into a more central role and dominance as the exemplary spiritual devotee, particularly with the popular vernacular text Ramcharitmanas by Saint Tulsidas (~ 1575 CE). The Ramcharitmanas presented Rama as a Vishnu avatar, supreme being and a personal god worthy of devotion, with Hanuman as the ideal loving devotee with heroic courage, strength and powers.

It is Saint Tulsidas who composes a hymn praising Hanuman's devotion and other virtues, which is popularly recited as 'Hanuman Chalisa'

During this era, Hanuman evolved and emerged as the ideal combination of shakti and bhakti. Stories and folk traditions in and after the 17th century, began to reformulate and present Hanuman as a divine being, as a descendant of deities, and as an avatar of Shiva. He emerged as a champion of those religiously persecuted, expressing resistance, a yogi, an inspiration for martial artists and warriors, a character with less fur and increasingly human, symbolizing cherished virtues and internal values, and worthy of devotion in his own right. This evolution of Hanuman's religious status, and his cultural role as well as his iconography, continued through the colonial era and into post-colonial times.

== Itihasa-Purana ==
=== Birth ===
According to Hindu folklore as narrated in the Itihasa-Purana, Hanuman was born to mother Anjana and father Kesari. In the Valmiki Ramayana (Kishkindha Kanda, Chapter 66), Anjana Devi receives a divine blessing from Vayu, who approaches her through a non-physical agency (manasā) and grants her a son, Hanuman. So, Hanuman is the son of the wind god Vayu. The tale presents a dual account of his parentage, Hanuman is identified as the kṣetrajāputra of the vanara chief Kesari (i.e., son through his wife; social or legal father), while also being explicitly described as the aurasa putra (direct son) of Vayu (4.66.18; 4.66.29–30). He is further referred to as Vayu putra and depicted as possessing qualities such as speed and strength comparable to those of Vayu. The Garuda Purana (3.16.68) describes Hanuman as a marud-amsha (manifestation or incarnation of Vayu), born during the incarnation of Rama for the purpose of assisting him, and further identifies the same being as Bhimasena in the Mahabharata.

Maharshi Veda Vyasa proposed Anjanadri Hill at Tirumala is the birthplace of Hanuman. Anjaneri in Nasik, Maharashtra along with Anjeneri Anjanadri (Near Hampi) in Gangavathi Taluk Koppal District, Karnataka, is one of a number of places that claim to be the location of Kishkinda.

=== Childhood ===
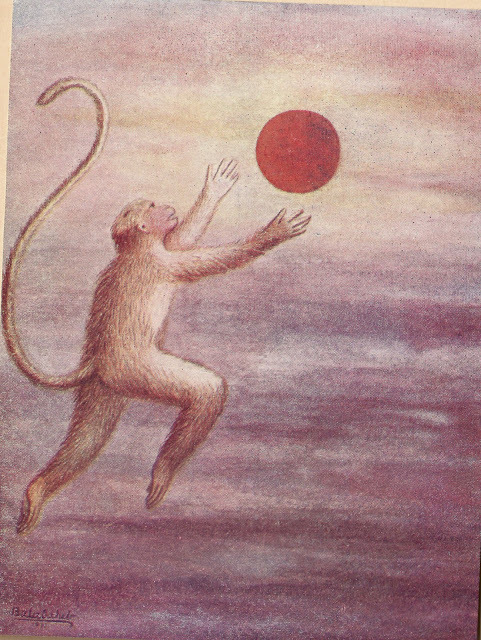
Child Hanuman reaches for the Sun thinking it is a fruit by BSP Pratinidhi

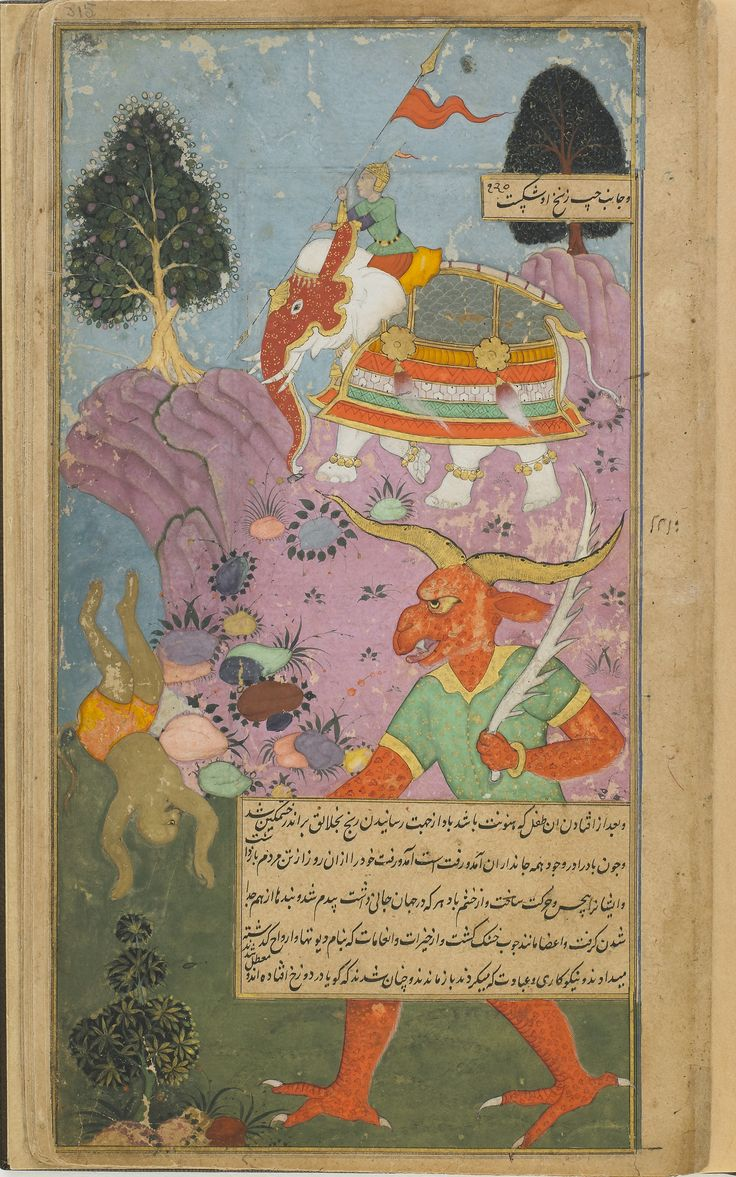
Indra maintains the celestial order by striking down the precocious Hanuman.

According to Valmiki's Ramayana, one morning in his childhood, Hanuman was hungry and saw the sun. Mistaking it for a ripe fruit, he leaped up to eat it. In one version of the story, the king of gods Indra intervened and struck Hanuman with his thunderbolt. It hit Hanuman on his jaw, and he fell to the earth dead with a broken jaw. Hanuman's father, Vayu, became upset and withdrew all the air from Earth. The lack of air created immense suffering to all living beings. This led Shiva to intervene and resuscitate Hanuman, which in turn prompted Vayu to return air to living beings. As Indra is the one who had injured Hanuman, he grants Hanuman a wish that his body would be as strong as Indra's Vajra, and that his Vajra can also not harm him. Along with Indra other gods have also granted him wishes: the god Agni granted Hanuman a wish that fire won't harm him; god Varuna granted a wish for Hanuman that water won't harm him; god Vayu granted a wish for Hanuman that he will be as fast as wind and that the wind won't harm him. Brahma also granted Hanuman a wish that he can travel anywhere. Hence these wishes make Hanuman an immortal, who has unique powers and strength.

In another Hindu version of his childhood narrative, which is likely older and also found in Jain texts such as the 8th-century Dhurtakhyana, Hanuman's leap to the sun proves to be fatal and he is burned to ashes from the sun's heat. His ashes fall onto the earth and oceans. Gods then gather the ashes and his bones from land and, with the help of fishes, re-assemble him. They find everything except one fragment of his jawbone. His great-grandfather on his mother's side then asks Surya to restore the child to life. Surya returns him to life, but Hanuman is left with a disfigured jaw. Hanuman is said to have spent his childhood in Kishkindha.

Some time after this event, Hanuman begins using his supernatural powers on innocent bystanders as simple pranks, until one day he pranks a meditating sage. In fury, the sage curses Hanuman to forget the vast majority of his powers. The curse remains in effect until he is reminded of his powers in his adulthood.

=== Adulthood ===
==== Ramayana ====
After Rama and his brother Lakshmana search for Rama's kidnapped wife, Sita, they arrive in Kishkindha. Rama's newfound ally, the monkey king Sugriva, agrees to send scouts in all four directions to search for Rama's missing wife. To the south, Sugriva sends Hanuman and some others, including the great bear Jambavan. This group travels all the way to the southernmost tip of India, where they encounter the ocean with the island of Lanka (said to be modern-day Sri Lanka) visible on the horizon. The group wishes to investigate the island, but none can swim or jump so far (it was common for such supernatural powers to exist among figures in these epics). However, Jambavan knows from prior events that Hanuman used to be able to do such a feat with ease, and lifts his curse.

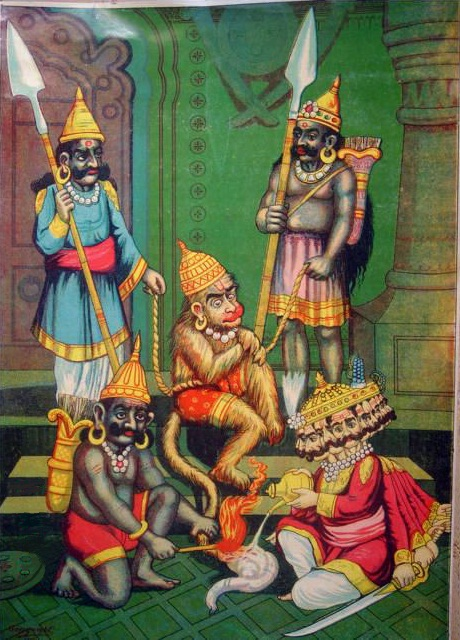
Ravana burns Hanuman's tail.

The curse lifted, Hanuman now remembers all of his dynamic divine powers. He is said to have transformed into the size of mountain and flew across the narrow channel to Lanka. Upon landing, he discovers a city populated by the Lanka king Ravana and his demon followers, so he shrinks down to the size of an ant and sneaks into the city. After searching the city, he discovers Sita in a grove, guarded by demon warriors. When they all fall asleep, he meets with Sita and discusses how he came to find her. She reveals that Ravana kidnapped her and is forcing her to marry him soon. He offers to rescue her but Sita refuses, stating that her husband must do it.

What happens next differs by account, but a common tale is that after visiting Sita, he starts destroying the grove, prompting his capture. Regardless of the tale, he ends up captured in the court of Ravana himself, who laughs when Hanuman tells him that Rama is coming to take back Sita. Ravana orders his servants to light Hanuman's tail on fire as torture for threatening his safety. However, every time they put on an oil-soaked cloth to burn, he grows his tail longer so that more cloths need to be added. This continues until Ravana has had enough and orders the lighting to begin. However, when his tail is lit, he shrinks his tail back and breaks free of his bonds with his superhuman strength. He jumps out a window and jumps from rooftop to rooftop, burning down building after building, until much of the city is ablaze. Seeing this triumph, Hanuman leaves for India.

When he returns, he tells his scouting party what had occurred, and they rush back to Kishkindha, where Rama had been waiting all along for news. Hearing that Sita was safe and was awaiting him, Rama gathered the support of Sugriva's army and marched for Lanka. Thus begins the legendary Battle of Lanka.

Throughout the long battle, Hanuman played a role as a general in the army. During one intense fight, Lakshmana, Rama's brother, was fatally wounded; it was thought that he would die without the aid of a herb from a Himalayan mountain. Hanuman was the only one who could make the journey so quickly, and was thus sent to the mountain.

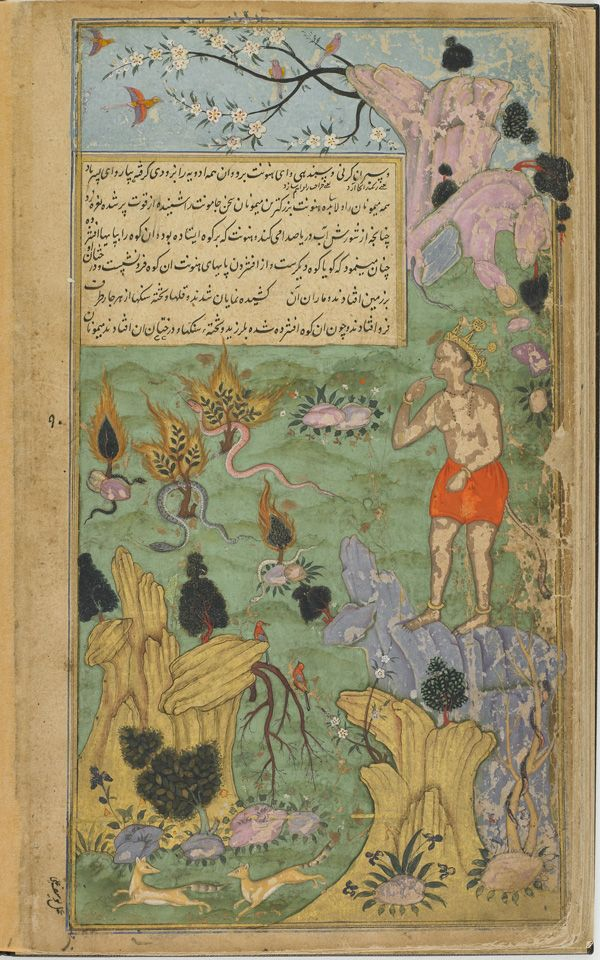
Hanuman and the healing herb

Upon arriving, he discovered that there were many herbs along the mountainside, and did not want to take the wrong herb back. So instead, he grew to the size of a mountain, ripped the mountain from the Earth, and flew it back to the battle. A chunk of this mountain was said to have fallen down and the present day "Forts Purandar and Vajragad" are believed to be the fallen pieces.

In the end, Rama revealed his divine powers as the incarnation of the god Vishnu, and slew Ravana and the rest of the demon army. Finally, Rama returned to his home of Ayodhya to return to his place as king. After blessing all those who aided him in the battle with gifts, Rama gave Hanuman his gift, which Hanuman threw away. Many court officials, perplexed, were angered by this act. Hanuman replied that rather than needing a gift to remember Rama, he would always be in his heart. Some court officials, still upset, asked him for proof, and Hanuman tore open his chest, which had an image of Rama and Sita on his heart. Now proven as a true devotee, Rama cured him and blessed him with immortality, but Hanuman refused this and asked only for a place at Rama's feet to worship him. Touched, Rama blessed him with immortality anyway. Like Shesha Nag, Hanuman would live on after the kalpa (destruction of the universe).

==== Mahabharata ====
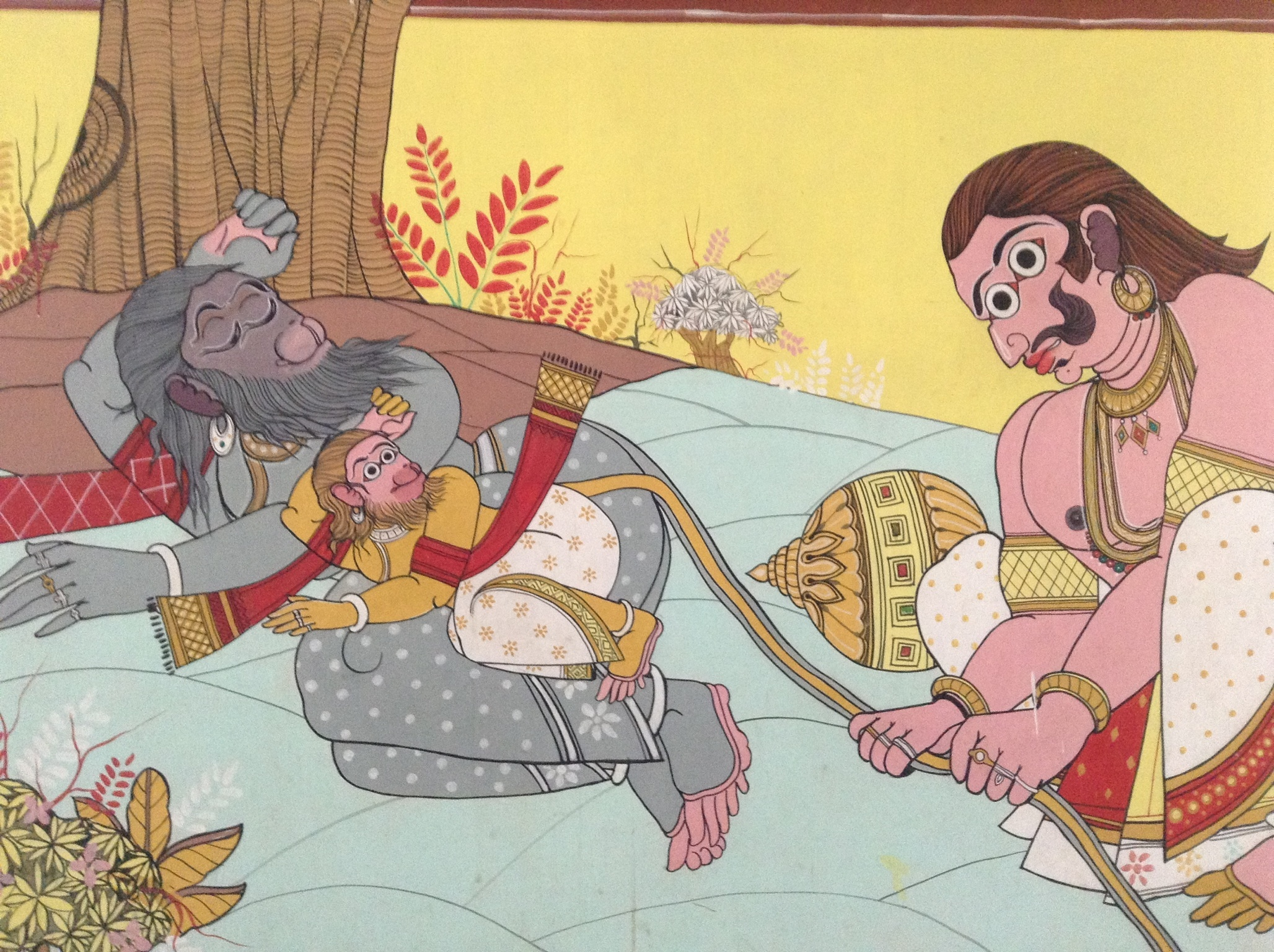
Bhima tries to lift Hanuman's tail.

Centuries after the events of the Ramayana, and during the events of the Mahabharata, Hanuman becomes a nearly forgotten demigod living his life in a forest. After some time, his spiritual brother through the god Vayu, Bhima, passes through looking for flowers for his wife. Hanuman senses this and decides to teach him a lesson, as Bhima had been known to be boastful of his superhuman strength (at this point in time supernatural powers were much rarer than in the Ramayana but still seen in the Hindu epics). Bhima encountered Hanuman lying on the ground in the shape of a feeble old monkey. He asked Hanuman to move, but he would not. As stepping over an individual was considered extremely disrespectful in this time, Hanuman suggested lifting his tail up to create a passage. Bhima heartily accepted, but could not lift the tail.

Bhima, humbled, realized that the frail monkey was some sort of deity, and asked him to reveal himself. Hanuman revealed himself, much to Bhima's surprise, and the brothers embraced. Hanuman prophesied that Bhima would soon be a part of a terrible war, and promised Bhima that he would sit on the flag of his brother Arjuna's chariot and shout a battle cry for Bhima that would weaken the hearts of his enemies. Content, Hanuman left his brother to his search.

== Attributes ==
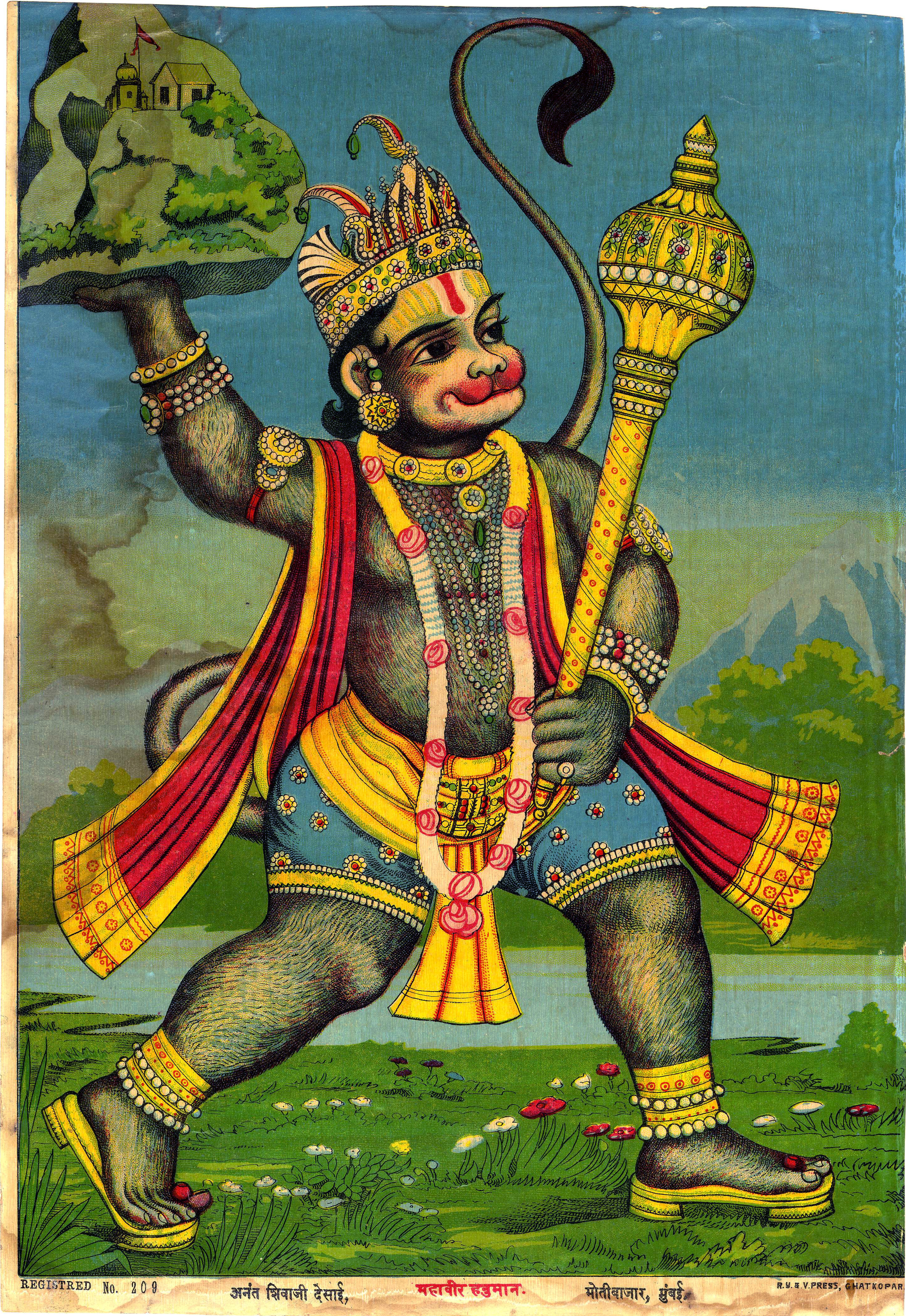
Hanuman fetches the herb-bearing mountain, in a print from the Ravi Varma Press, 1910s.

Hanuman has many attributes, including:

- Chiranjivi (immortal): various versions of Ramayana and Rama Katha state towards their conclusion, just before Rama and Lakshmana die, that Hanuman is blessed with immortality. He will be a part of humanity forever, while the story of Rama lives on and the story will go on as the gods recite the story always. Thus, he will live forever.
- Brahmachari (self-controlled): one who controls their lust and observes discipline in relation to sensory and material desires.
- Kurūp and Sundar: he is described in Hindu texts as kurūp (ugly) on the outside, but divinely sundar (beautiful inside). The Hanuman Chalisa describes him as handsome with a complexion of molten gold (kanchana barana birāja subesā).
- Kama-rupin: In epic stories, Hanuman is described as being able to change size (kama-rupin). He can become vary small or vast at will. He uses this attribute to shrink and enter Lanka, as he searches for the kidnapped Sita imprisoned in Lanka. Later on, he takes on the size of a mountain, blazing with radiance, to show his true power to Sita.
- Strength: Hanuman is extraordinarily strong, one capable of lifting and carrying any burden for a cause. He is called Vira, Mahavira, Mahabala and other names signifying this attribute of his. During the epic war between Rama and Ravana, Rama's brother Lakshmana is wounded. He can only be healed and his death prevented by a herb found in a particular Himalayan mountain. Hanuman leaps and finds the mountain. There, states Ramayana, Hanuman finds the mountain is full of many herbs. He does not know which one to take. So, he lifts the entire Himalayan mountain and carries it across India to Lanka for Lakshmana. His immense strength thus helps Lakshmana recover from his wound. This story is the popular basis for the iconography where he is shown flying and carrying a mountain on his palm.
- Innovative: Hanuman is described as someone who constantly faces very difficult odds, where the adversary or circumstances threaten his mission with certain defeat and his very existence. Yet he finds an innovative way to turn the odds. For example, after he finds Sita, delivers Rama's message, and persuades her that he is indeed Rama's true messenger, he is discovered by the prison guards. They arrest Hanuman, and under Ravana's orders take him to a public execution. There, Ravana's guards begin his torture by tying his tail with oiled cloth and setting it on fire. Hanuman then leaps from one palace rooftop to another, burning everything down in the process.

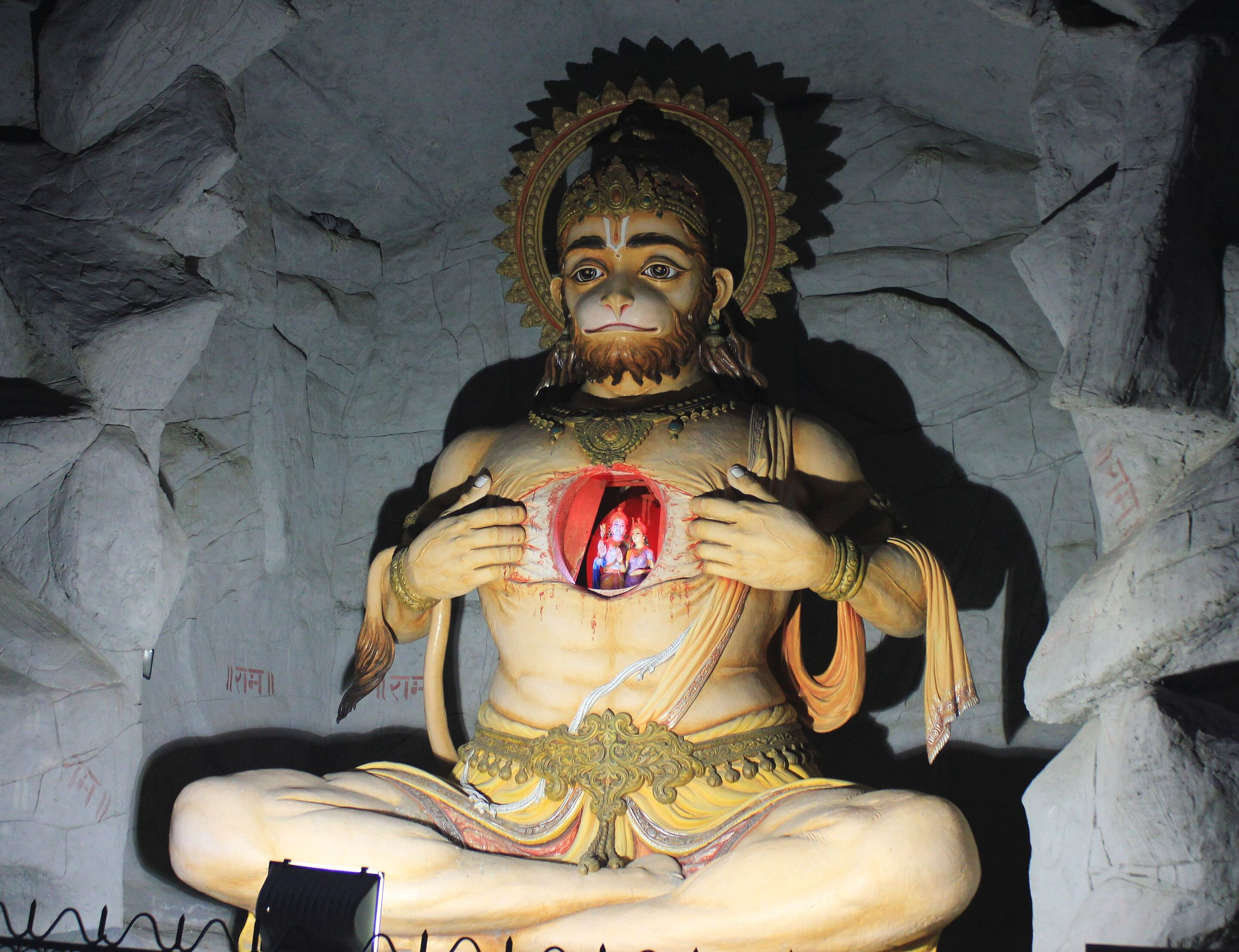
Hanuman depicted with Rama and Sita in his heart at Swargashram, India

- Bhakti: Hanuman is presented as the exemplary devotee (bhakta) of Rama and Sita. The Hindu texts such as the Bhagavata Purana, the Bhakta Mala, the Ananda Ramayana and the Ramacharitmanas present him as someone who is talented, strong, brave and spiritually devoted to Rama. The Rama texts and narratives such as the Ramayana and the Ramacharitmanas, in turn themselves, present the Hindu dharmic concept of the ideal, virtuous and compassionate man (Rama) and woman (Sita) thereby providing the context for attributes assigned therein for Hanuman.
- Learned Yogi: In the late medieval texts and thereafter, such as those by Tulasidas, attributes of Hanuman include learned in Vedanta philosophy of Hinduism, the Vedas, a poet, a polymath, a grammarian, a singer and musician par excellence.
- Remover of obstacles: in devotional literature, Hanuman is the remover of difficulties.
- Healer of diseases, pains and sorrows: Heals all kinds of diseases, pains and sorrows of devotees.
- Slayer of demons, evil and negative energies: Hanuman is offered worship to rid of negative influences, such as ghosts, evil spirits and ill-intentioned humans. The following names of Hanuman describe some of these qualities, Rakshovidhwansakaraka, Akshahantre, Dashagreevakulantaka, Lankineebhanjana, Simhikaprana Bhanjana, Maharavanamardana, Kalanemi Pramathana.
- Protector and saviour of devotees of Shri Ram and himself: The doorkeeper and protector of the door to Rama's court, and protector and saviour of devotees.
- Five-faced or Panchamukha when he assumes his fierce form: East facing Hanuman face (Anjaneya) that grants purity of mind and success. South facing man-lion face Narasimha that West facing Garuda face, north facing Boar face Varaha and horse face (Hayagriva) facing towards the sky (upwards).

== Texts ==
=== Hinduism ===
==== Ramayana ====
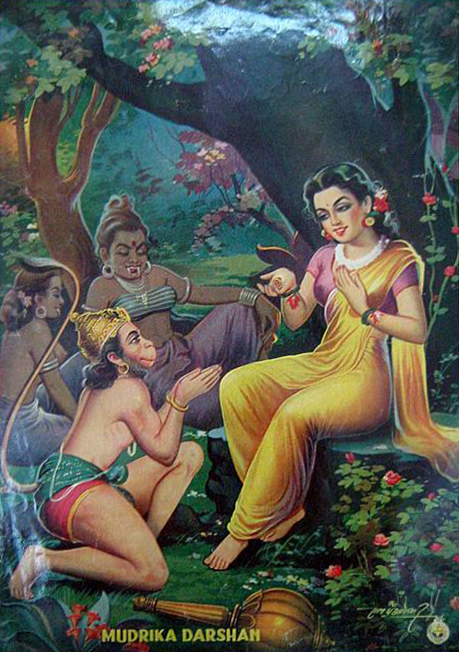
Hanuman finds Sita in the Ashoka grove, and delivers her Rama's ring.

The Sundara Kanda, the fifth book in the Ramayana, focuses on Hanuman. Hanuman meets Rama in the last year of the latter's 14-year exile, after the demon king Ravana had kidnapped Sita. With his brother Lakshmana, Rama is searching for his wife Sita. This, and related Rama tales are the most extensive stories about Hanuman.

Numerous versions of the Ramayana exist within India. These present variant stories of Hanuman, Rama, Sita, Lakshmana and Ravana. The figures and their descriptions vary, in some cases quite significantly.

==== Mahabharata ====
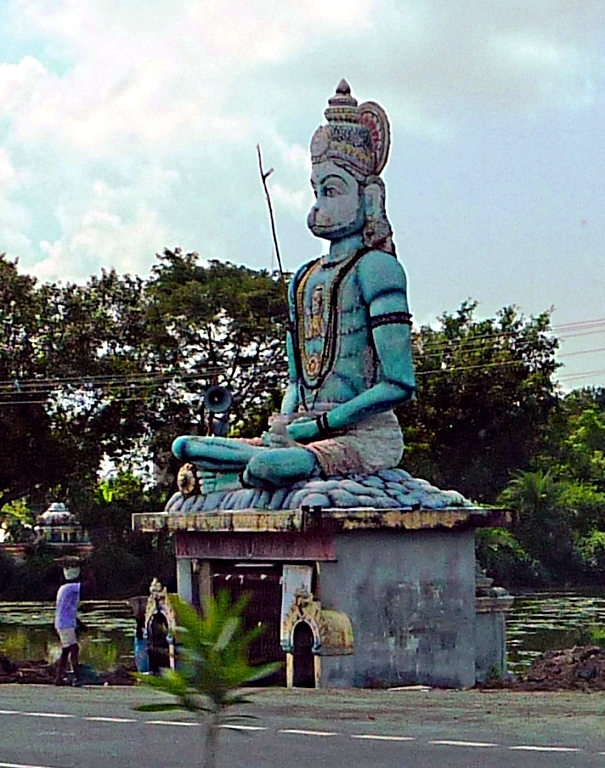
Roadside Hanuman shrine south of Chennai, Tamil Nadu

The Mahabharata is another major epic which has a short mention of Hanuman. In Book 3, the Vana Parva of the Mahabharata, he is presented as a half-brother of Bhima, who meets him accidentally on his way to Mount Kailasha. A man of extraordinary strength, Bhima is unable to move Hanuman's tail, making him realize and acknowledge the strength of Hanuman. This story attests to the ancient chronology of Hanuman. It is also a part of artwork and reliefs such as those at the Vijayanagara ruins.

=== Other literature ===
Apart from Ramayana and Mahabharata, Hanuman is mentioned in several other texts. Some of these stories add to his adventures mentioned in the earlier epics, while others tell alternative stories of his life. The Skanda Purana mentions Hanuman in Rameswaram.

In a South Indian version of Shiva Purana, Hanuman is described as the son of Shiva and Mohini (the female avatar of Vishnu), or alternatively he has been linked to or merged with the origin of Swami Ayyappa who is popular in parts of South India.

In the Muktikā Upanishad Hanuman is in dialogue with Rama about the subject of moksha.

==== Hanuman Chalisa ====
The 16th-century Indian poet Tulsidas wrote Hanuman Chalisa, a devotional song dedicated to Hanuman. He said he had visions where he met face to face with Hanuman. Based on these meetings, he wrote Ramcharitmanas, an Awadhi language version of Ramayana.

==== Relation with Devi or Shakti ====
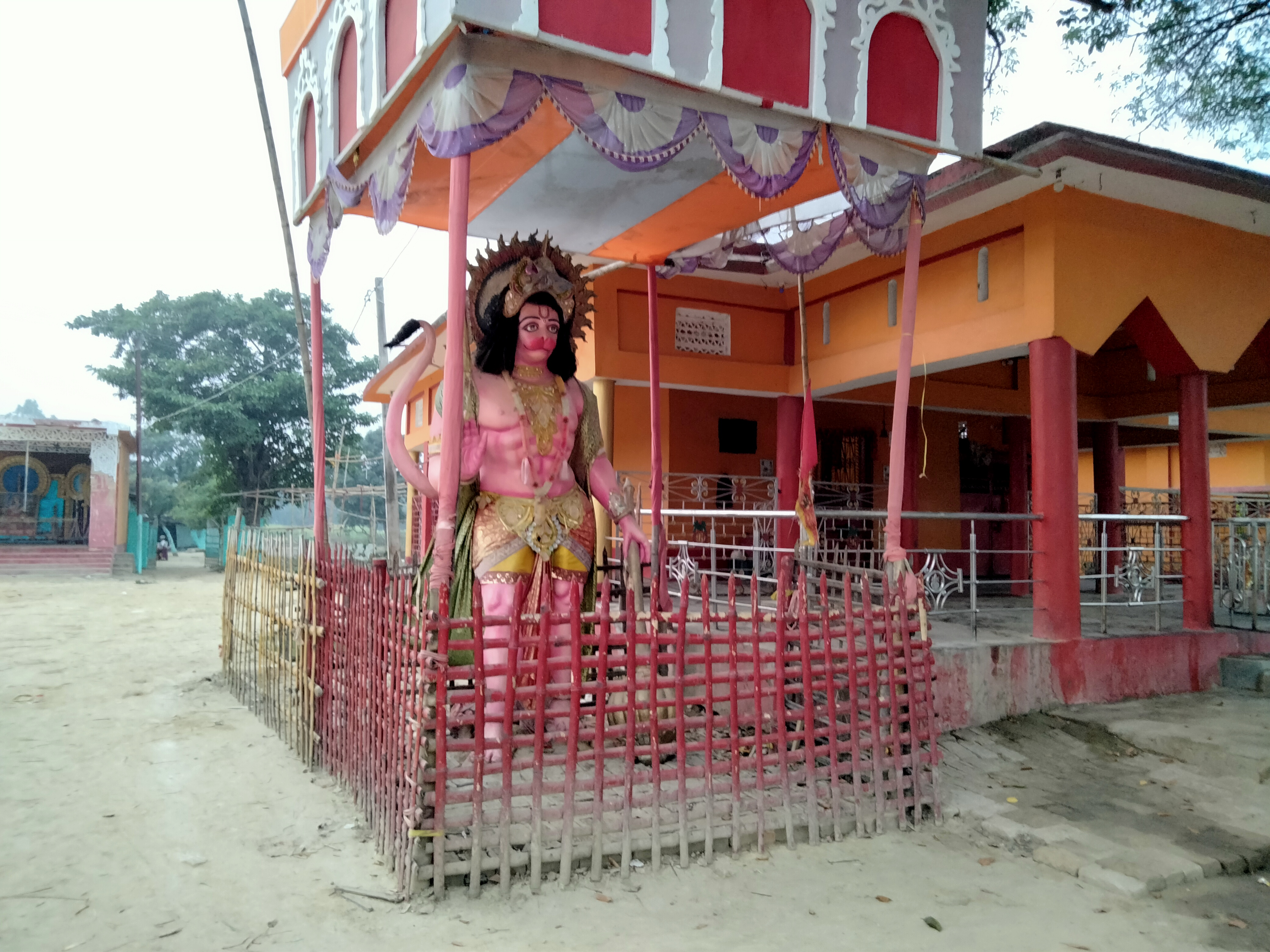
Hanuman Statue at Maharani Sthan Devi Temple in Basuki, Mithila

The relation between Hanuman and the goddess Kali finds mention in the Krittivasi Ramayana. Their meeting takes place in the Yuddha Kanda of this Ramayana, in the tale of Mahiravana. Mahiravana is stated to be the king of Patala (deepest netherworld) and a trusted friend/brother of Ravana. After his son, Indrajita, was killed, Ravana sought Mahiravana's help to kill Rama and Lakshmana. One night, Mahiravana, using his maya, took Vibhishana's form and entered Rama's camp. He cast the nidra mantra (sleeping spell) on the vanara army, kidnapped Rama and Lakshmana, and took them to Patala to sacrifice them to Devi, as per Ravana's suggestion. Hanuman learnt the way to Patala from Vibhishana and made haste to rescue his lords. On his journey, he met Makardhwaja, who claimed to be Hanuman's son. Hanuman defeated and tied him, and went inside the palace. He met Chandrasena, who told about the sacrifice and the way to kill Mahiravana. Hanuman shrank his size to that of a bee and came across a huge idol of Kali. After being prayed to, the goddess agreed to help Hanuman rescue the brothers, allowing him to take her place while she slipped below. When Mahiravana asked the brothers to bow, they refused, claiming not to know how to perform the act. As Mahiravana decided to demonstrate, Hanuman assumed his panchamukha (five-faced) form (manifesting the additional heads of Garuda, Narasimha, Varaha, and Hayagriva), blowing the five oil lamps present in the chamber in the five cardinal directions. He severed the head of Mahiravana, thus killing him. He carried Rama and Lakshmana upon his shoulders to return them to their camp, before which he released and crowned Makaradhvaja the king of Patala. The story of Ahiravan finds its place in the Ramayanas of the east. It can be found in the Bengali version of the Ramayana, written by Krittibash, in the passage known as Mahirabonerpala. It is believed that Kali, pleased with Hanuman, blessed him to be her dvarapala (gatekeeper).

Hanuman and Vaishno Devi

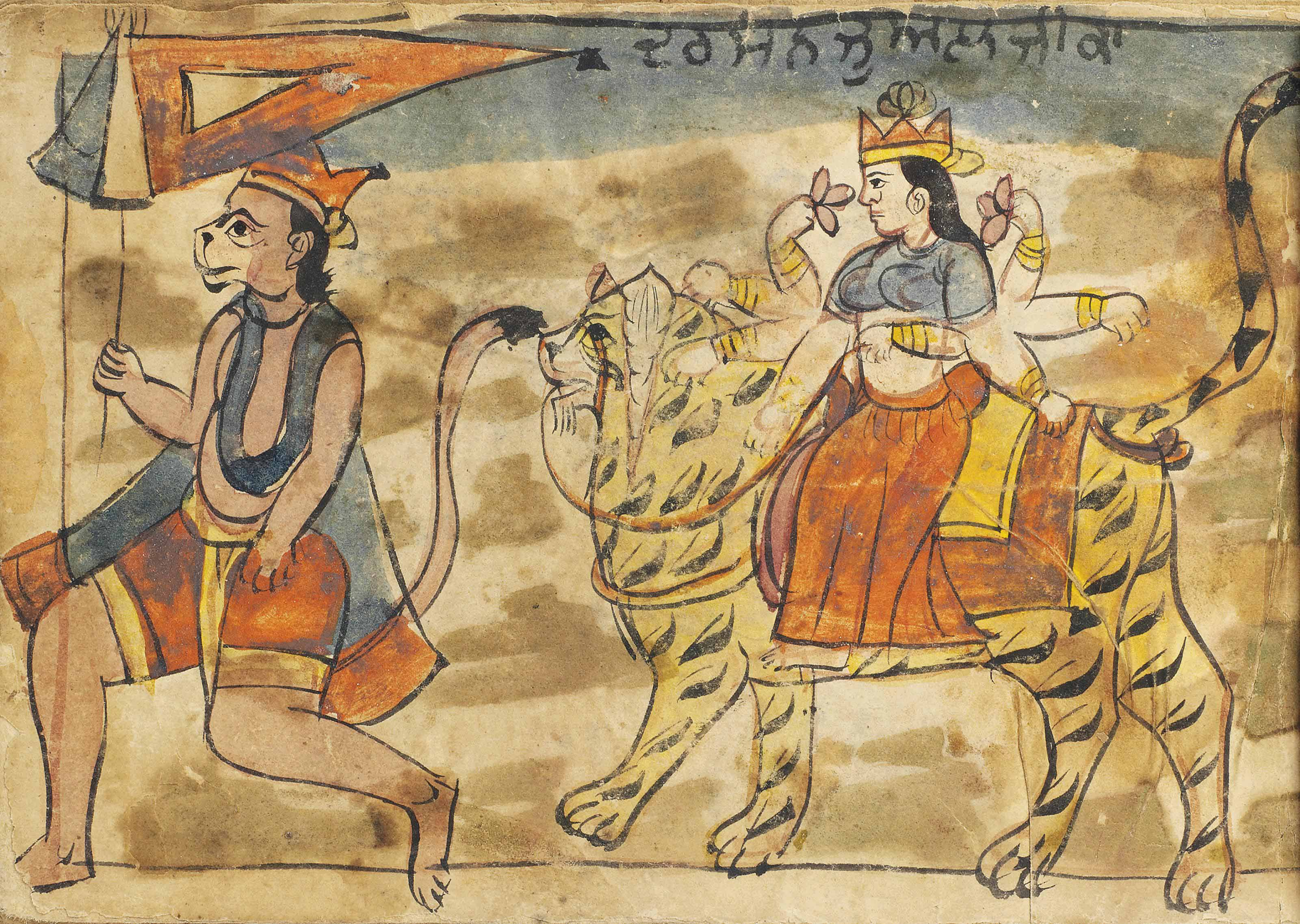
Illustration of Hanuman and Vaishno Devi from a Sikh religious manuscript

The story of the incarnation of Vaishno Devi, Lord Ram assigns Hanuman the specific duty of protecting her during her long penance. When the Vaishno devi met Lord Ram during the Treta Yuga, she expressed her wish to marry him. Lord Ram promised her that she would become his consort in the Kaliyuga and instructed her to go to the beautiful cave on Trikuta Parvat to continue her penance until that time. To ensure her safety and facilitate her penance, Lord Ram declared that certain brave monkeys (langur veer) would act as her protectors or guards specifically, he appointed hanuman as her gatekeeper. When Vaishno Devi reached the beautiful cave on Trikut mountain, she stationed a brave Hanuman Ji at the door of the cave to act as a guard and prevent Bhairavnath from following her inside. Bhairav attempted to enter the cave and began fighting with the brave Hanuman Ji. Although the brave Hanuman fought he was overcome or defeated.

=== Buddhism ===
Hanuman appears in Tibetan Buddhism (southwest China) and Khotanese (west China, central Asia and northern Iran) versions of Ramayana. The Khotanese versions have a Jātaka tales-like theme but are generally similar to the Hindu texts in the storyline of Hanuman. The Tibetan version is more embellished, and without attempts to reference the Jātakas. Also, in the Tibetan version, novel elements appear such as Hanuman carrying love letters between Rama and Sita, in addition to the Hindu version wherein Rama sends the wedding ring with him as a message to Sita. Further, in the Tibetan version, Rama chides Hanuman for not corresponding with him through letters more often, implying that the monkey-messenger and warrior is a learned being who can read and write.

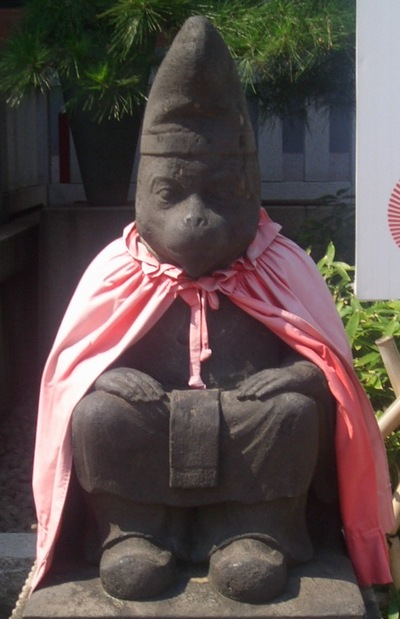
In Japan, icons of the divine monkey (Saruta Biko), guarding temples such as Saru-gami at Hie Shrine.

In the Sri Lankan versions of Ramayana, which are titled after Ravana, the story is less melodramatic than the Indian stories. Many of the stories recounting Hanuman's bravery and innovative ability are found in the Sinhala versions. The stories in which the figures are involved have Buddhist themes, and lack the embedded ethics and values structure according to Hindu dharma. According to Hera Walker, some Sinhalese communities seek the aid of Hanuman through prayers to his mother. In Chinese Buddhist texts, states Arthur Cotterall, myths mention the meeting of the Buddha with Hanuman, as well as Hanuman's great triumphs. According to Rosalind Lefeber, the arrival of Hanuman in East Asian Buddhist texts may trace its roots to the translation of the Ramayana into Chinese and Tibetan in the 6th-century CE.

In both China and Japan, much like in India, there is a lack of a radical divide between humans and animals, with all living beings and nature assumed to be related to humans. There is no exaltation of humans over animals or nature, unlike the Western traditions. A divine monkey has been a part of the historic literature and culture of China and Japan, possibly influenced by the close cultural contact through Buddhist monks and pilgrimage to India over two millennia. For example, the Japanese text Keiranshuyoshu, while presenting its mythology about a divine monkey, that is the theriomorphic Shinto emblem of Hie shrines, describes a flying white monkey that carries a mountain from India to China, then from China to Japan. This story is based on a passage in the Ramayana where the wounded hero asks Hanuman to bring a certain herbal medicine from the Himalayas. As Hanuman does not know the herb he brings the entire mountain for the hero to choose from. By that time a learned medicine man from Lanka discovered the cure and Hanuman brings the mountain back to where he got it from. Many Japanese Shinto shrines and village boundaries, dated from the 8th to the 14th centuries, feature a monkey deity as guardian or intermediary between humans and gods (kami).

The Jātaka tales contain Hanuman-like stories. For example, the Buddha is described as a monkey-king in one of his earlier births in the Mahakapi Jātaka, wherein he as a compassionate monkey suffers and is abused, but who nevertheless continues to follow dharma in helping a human being who is lost and in danger.

Various scholars have suggested that Hanuman may have influenced the conception of Sun Wukong, the central figure in the Chinese epic Journey to the West.

=== Jainism ===
In Jain versions of the Rama story, Hanuman is not a divine monkey but a Vidyadhara (also called a Khecara in some texts), that is, a member of a class of powerful beings who possess vidyas, special supernatural sciences or powers. The Vanaras and Rakshasas are interpreted not as literal monkeys and demons, but as human or semi-divine branches of the larger Vidyadhara lineage. Their extraordinary abilities, such as aerial travel, magical transformations and other marvels, are explained through vidyas rather than divine incarnation.

In Jain universal history, Rama (Padma) is the eighth Baladeva, Lakshmana is the eighth Vasudeva, and Ravana is the eighth Prativasudeva. Accordingly, Rama does not kill Ravana; Lakshmana kills Ravana, in keeping with the Jain narrative scheme.

The earliest extensive Jain Ramayana is Vimalasuri's Paumacariya (Prakrit: Paumacariyam). In this tradition, Hanuman is born to Anjana Sundari and Pavananjaya. Anjana is banished after being wrongly suspected, and gives birth in the forest. Later, when she is being carried away in an aerial vehicle, the infant falls onto a rock; the rock shatters while the child remains unharmed. He is thereafter associated with Hanuruhapura, from which his name is explained.

Jain texts also differ from many Hindu traditions in portraying Hanuman not as a lifelong celibate. In the Paumacariya, he marries several women, and after his worldly life Hanuman later renounces and becomes a Jain ascetic.

Hanuman's relation to Sugriva and Vali is also treated differently in Jain Ramayana traditions. The Vanaras are not depicted as literal monkeys but as a clan whose emblem was a monkey, and the conflict surrounding Sugriva is presented in more human and political terms than in Valmiki's version.

The Jain explanation of the Vanara lineage is genealogical rather than zoological. According to this tradition, the Vanaras descend from a Vidyadhara line established at Vanaradvipa; the name Vanara is associated with the monkey emblem of the clan, not with actual simian nature. Likewise, shape-changing and similar feats are attributed to specific vidyas; for example, Ravana is described as acquiring the Bahurupa-vidya, a power associated with assuming multiple forms.

Unlike the better-known Hindu tradition, Jain versions generally minimize overtly miraculous episodes. Hanuman serves Rama as a loyal ally and envoy in the search for Sita, but several famous supernatural motifs are reduced or omitted. In Vimalasuri's telling there is, for example, no burning of Lanka in the usual epic form.

In later Jain literature, especially in the Digambara tradition, Hanuman is also identified as one of the Kāmadevas, a class of exceptionally handsome and heroic men celebrated in Jain universal history.

Later Jain retellings, including Ravishena's Sanskrit Padmapurana and Gunabhadra's Uttarapurana, preserve the broad outline of Hanuman's story while adapting it to Jain ethical and cosmological ideas, especially the themes of non-violence, karmic causation and renunciation.

=== Sikhism ===
In Sikhism, the Hindu god Rama has been referred to as Sri Ram Chandar, and the story of Hanuman as a siddha has been influential. After the birth of the martial Sikh Khalsa movement in 1699. The Sikh texts such as Hanuman Natak composed by Hirda Ram Bhalla, and Das Gur Katha by Kavi Kankan describe the heroic deeds of Hanuman.

During the colonial era, in Sikh seminaries in what is now Pakistan, Sikh teachers were called bhai, and they were required to study the Hanuman Natak, the Hanuman story containing Ramcharitmanas and other texts, all of which were available in Gurmukhi script.

Bhagat Kabir, a prominent writer of the scripture explicitly states that Hanuman does not know the full glory of the divine. This statement is in the context of the Divine as being unlimited and ever expanding. Ananta is therefore a name of the divine. In Sanskrit, anta means "end". The prefix -an is added to create the word Ananta (meaning "without end" or "unlimited").

ਹਨੂਮਾਨ ਸਰਿ ਗਰੁੜ ਸਮਾਨਾਂ

Hanūmān sar garuṛ samānāŉ.

Beings like Hanumaan, Garura,

ਸੁਰਪਤਿ ਨਰਪਤਿ ਨਹੀ ਗੁਨ ਜਾਨਾਂ Surpaṯ narpaṯ nahī gun jānāŉ.

Indra the King of the gods and the rulers of humans – none of them know Your Glories, Lord.

— Sri Guru Granth Sahib page 691

=== Southeast Asian texts ===
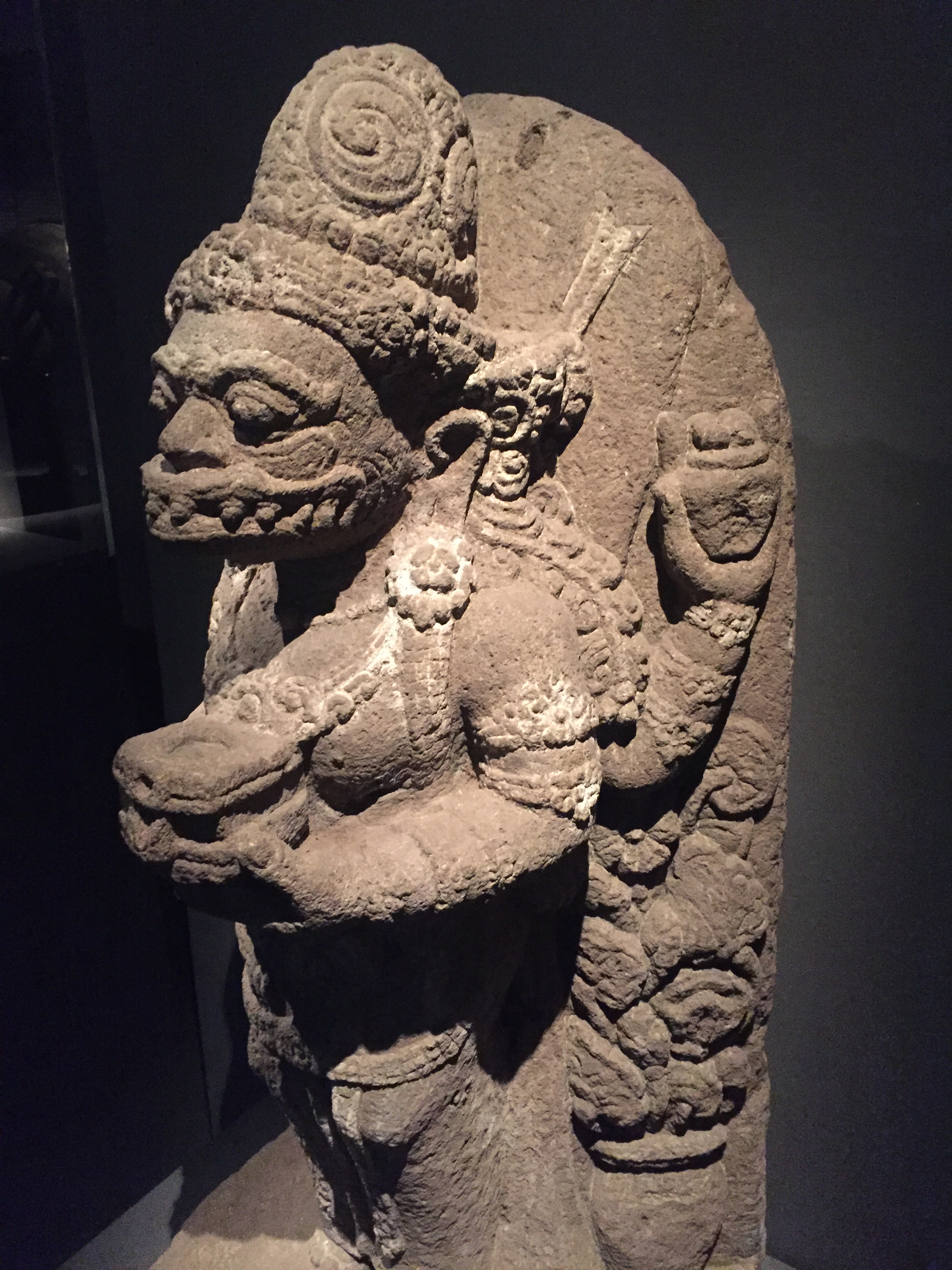
A Majapahit statue of Hanuman with a yoni (andesite; 14th century) from East Java, Indonesia

There exist non-Indian versions of the Ramayana, such as the Thai Ramakien. According to these versions of the Ramayana, Macchanu is the son of Hanuman borne by Suvannamaccha, daughter of Ravana.

Another storie tells that a demigod named Matsyaraja (also known as Makardhwaja or Matsyagarbha) claimed to be his son. Matsyaraja's birth is explained as follows: a fish (matsya) was impregnated by the drops of Hanuman's sweat, while he was bathing in the ocean.

Hanuman in southeast Asian texts differs from the north Indian Hindu version in various ways in the Burmese Ramayana, such as Rama Yagan, Alaung Rama Thagyin (in the Arakanese dialect), Rama Vatthu and Rama Thagyin, the Malay Ramayana, such as Hikayat Sri Rama and Hikayat Maharaja Ravana, and the Thai Ramayana, such as Ramakien. However, in some cases, the aspects of the story are similar to Hindu versions and Buddhist versions of Ramayana found elsewhere on the Indian subcontinent.

== Significance and influence ==
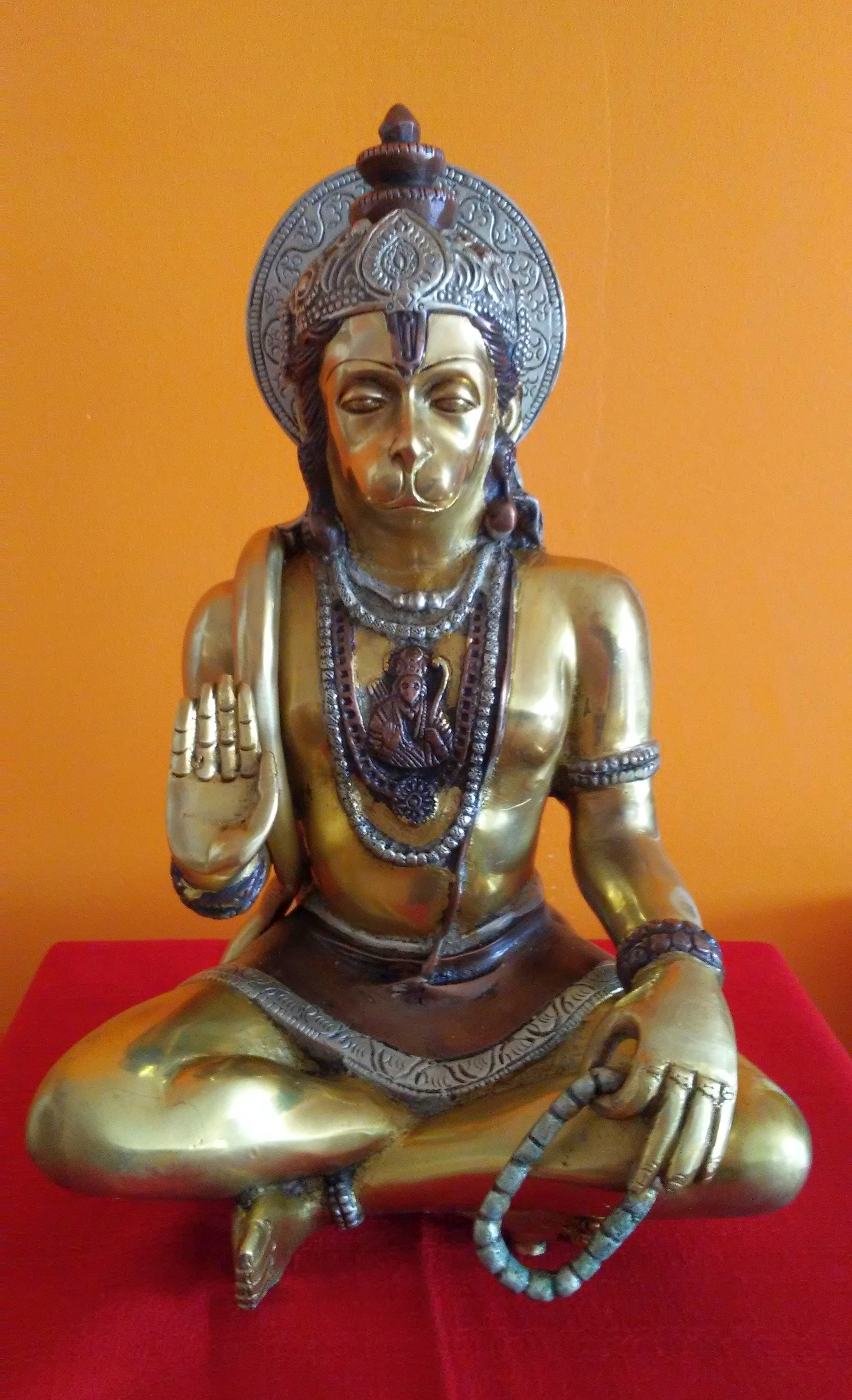
Hanuman murti seated in meditation in lotus asana

Hanuman became more important in the medieval period and came to be portrayed as the ideal devotee (bhakta) of Rama. Hanuman's life, devotion, and strength inspired wrestlers in India.

Devotionalism to Hanuman and his theological significance emerged long after the composition of the Ramayana, in the 2nd millennium CE. His prominence grew after the arrival of Islamic rule in the Indian subcontinent. He is viewed as the ideal combination of shakti ("strength, heroic initiative and assertive excellence") and bhakti ("loving, emotional devotion to his personal god Rama"). Beyond wrestlers, he has been the patron god of other martial arts. He is stated to be a gifted grammarian, meditating yogi and diligent scholar. He exemplifies the human excellences of temperance, faith and service to a cause.

"Greater than Ram is Ram's servant."

— Tulsidas, Ramcharitmanas 7.120.14

In 17th-century north and western regions of India, Hanuman emerged as an expression of resistance and dedication against Islamic persecution. For example, the bhakti poet-saint Ramdas presented Hanuman as a symbol of Marathi nationalism and resistance to Mughal Empire.

Hanuman in the colonial and post-colonial era has been a cultural icon, as a symbolic ideal combination of shakti and bhakti, as a right of Hindu people to express and pursue their forms of spirituality and religious beliefs (dharma). Political and religious organizations have named themselves after him or his synonyms such as Bajrang. Political parades or religious processions have featured men dressed up as Hanuman, along with women dressed up as gopis (milkmaids) of god Krishna, as an expression of their pride and right to their heritage, culture and religious beliefs. According to some scholars, the Hanuman-linked youth organizations have tended to have a paramilitary wing and have opposed other religions, with a mission of resisting the "evil eyes of Islam, Christianity and Communism", or as a symbol of Hindu nationalism.

== Iconography ==
Hanuman's iconography is most commonly identified by his distinctive simian face and tail. In modern iconography he is most commonly depicted as muscular, sometimes in a heroic pose, displaying his shakti, and at other times in a servile posture, illustrating his bhakti. Hanuman is depicted with specific objects such as a mace (his weapon of choice) and the Sanjeevani mountain, which allude to specific incidents in the Ramayana. In India, temple images of Hanuman are commonly coated in a red or orange sindhur mixed with oil.

The variation in iconography depicting Hanuman carrying the Sanjeevani mountain

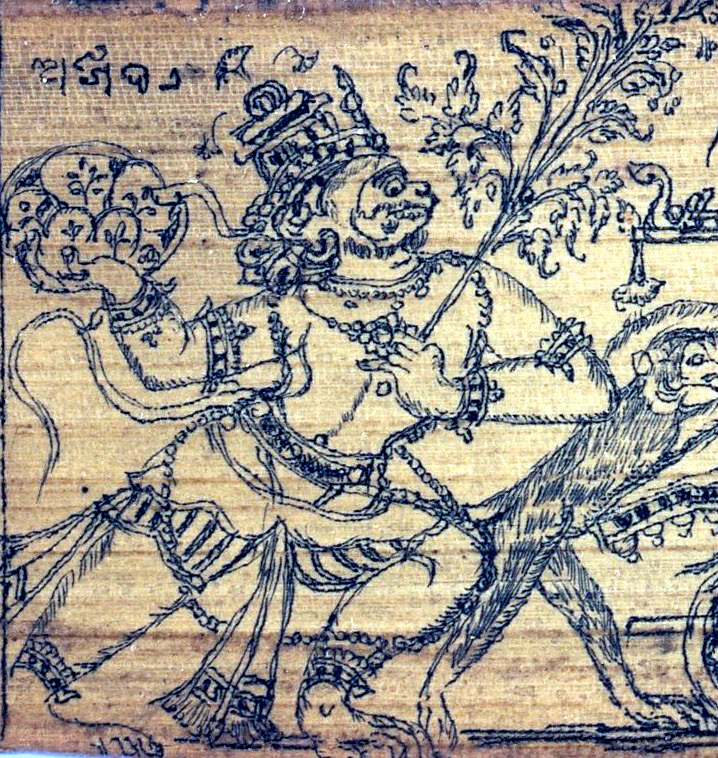
File:Hanuman_Brings_the_Gandhamardhana_Mountain_odisha_tala_patra.jpg

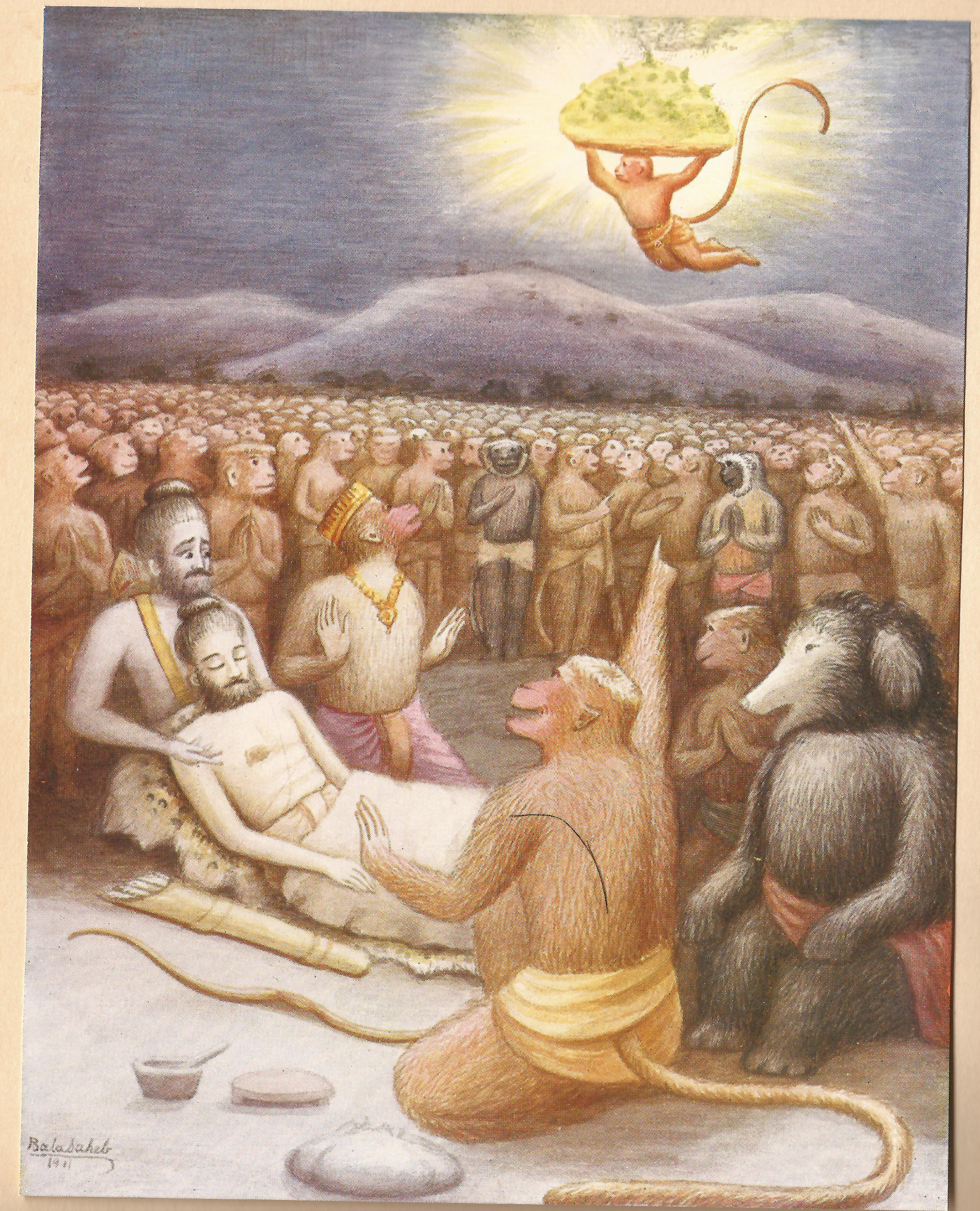
File:Hanuman_returns_with_sanjeevani_mountain_for_laxmana's_life.jpg

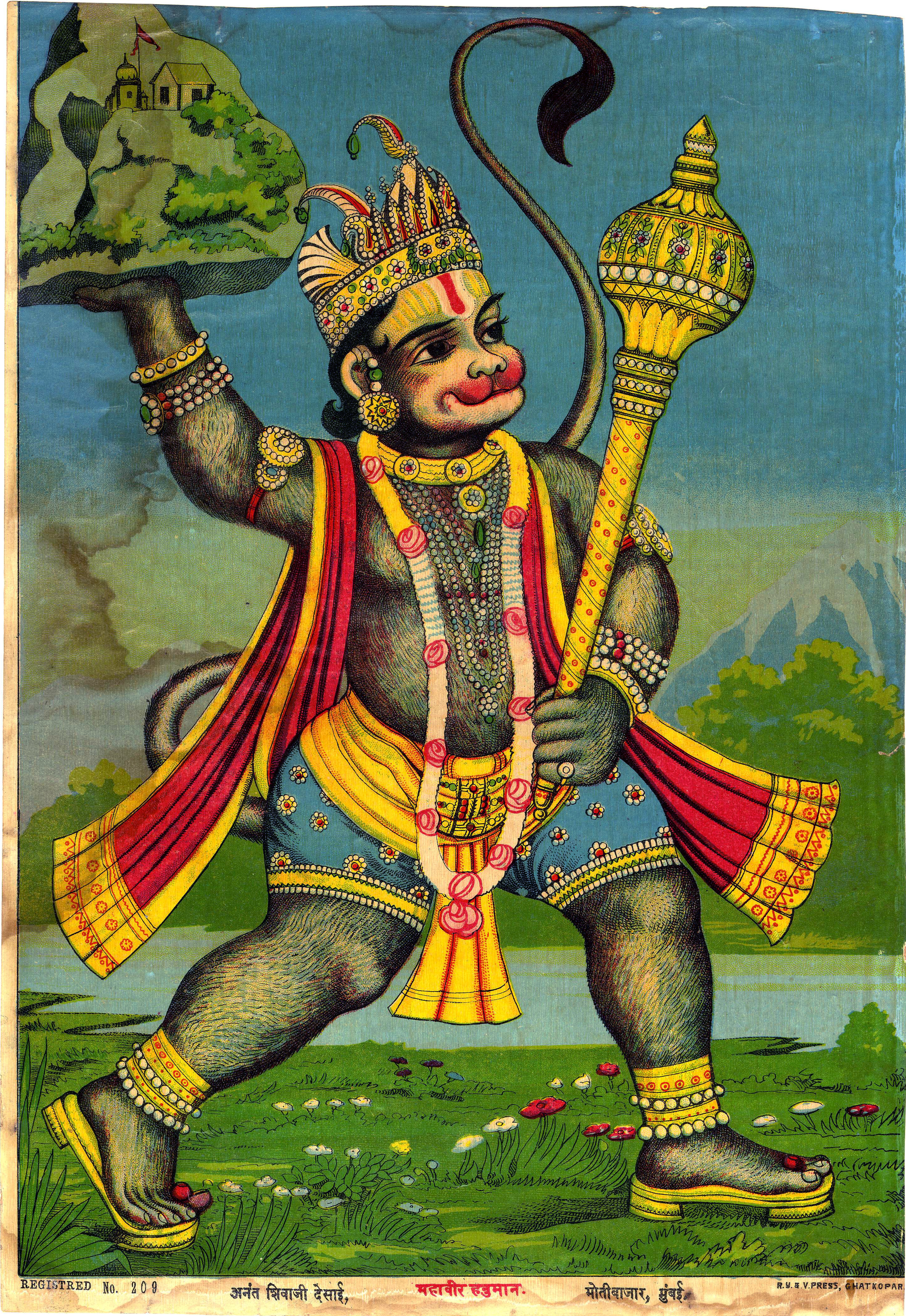
File:Hanuman_fetches_the_herb-bearing_mountain,_in_a_print_from_the_Ravi_Varma_Press,_1910's.jpg

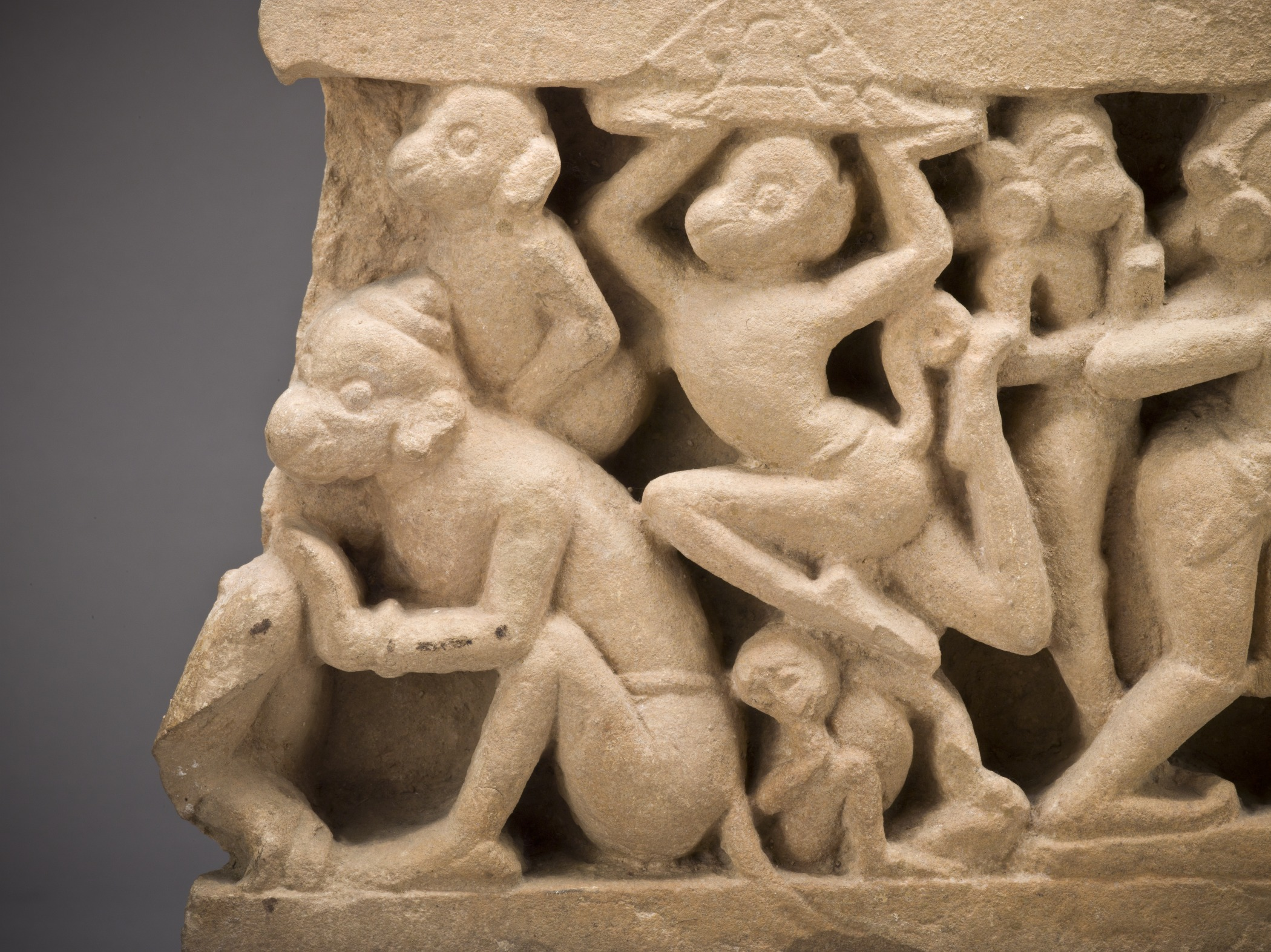
File:Hanuman_Carrying_the_Mountain_of_Medicinal_Herbs_(left);_Rama_Battles_Ravana_(right),_Architectural_Panel_with_Ramayana_(Adventures_of_Rama)_Scenes_LACMA_M.89.159.1_(6_of_6).jpg

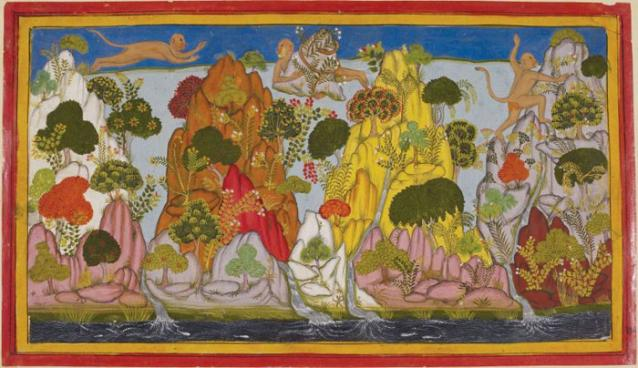
File:Hanuman_Herb_Mountain.jpg

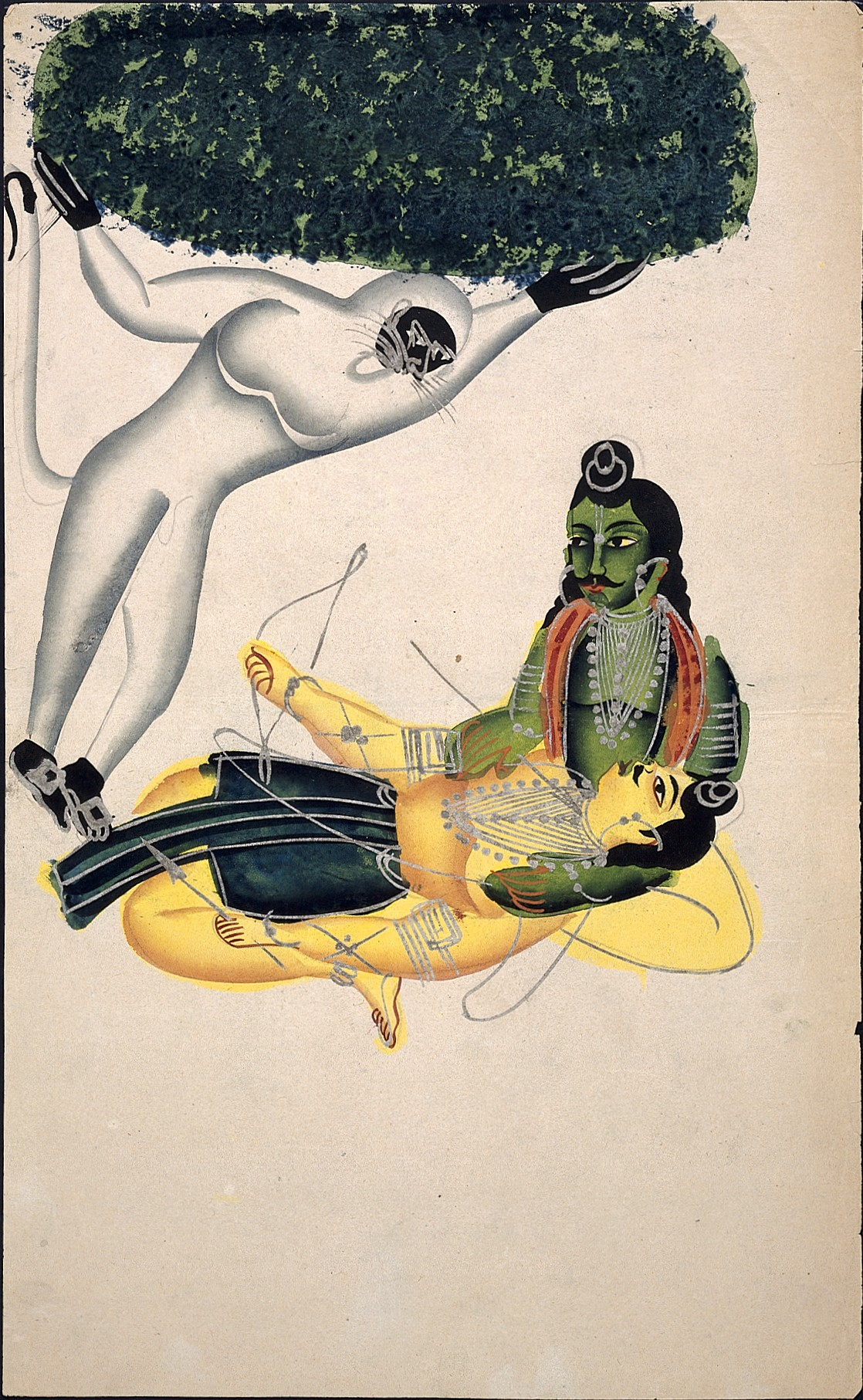
File:Hanuman_bringing_the_mountain_to_the_injured_Lakshmana_Wellcome_L0022499.jpg
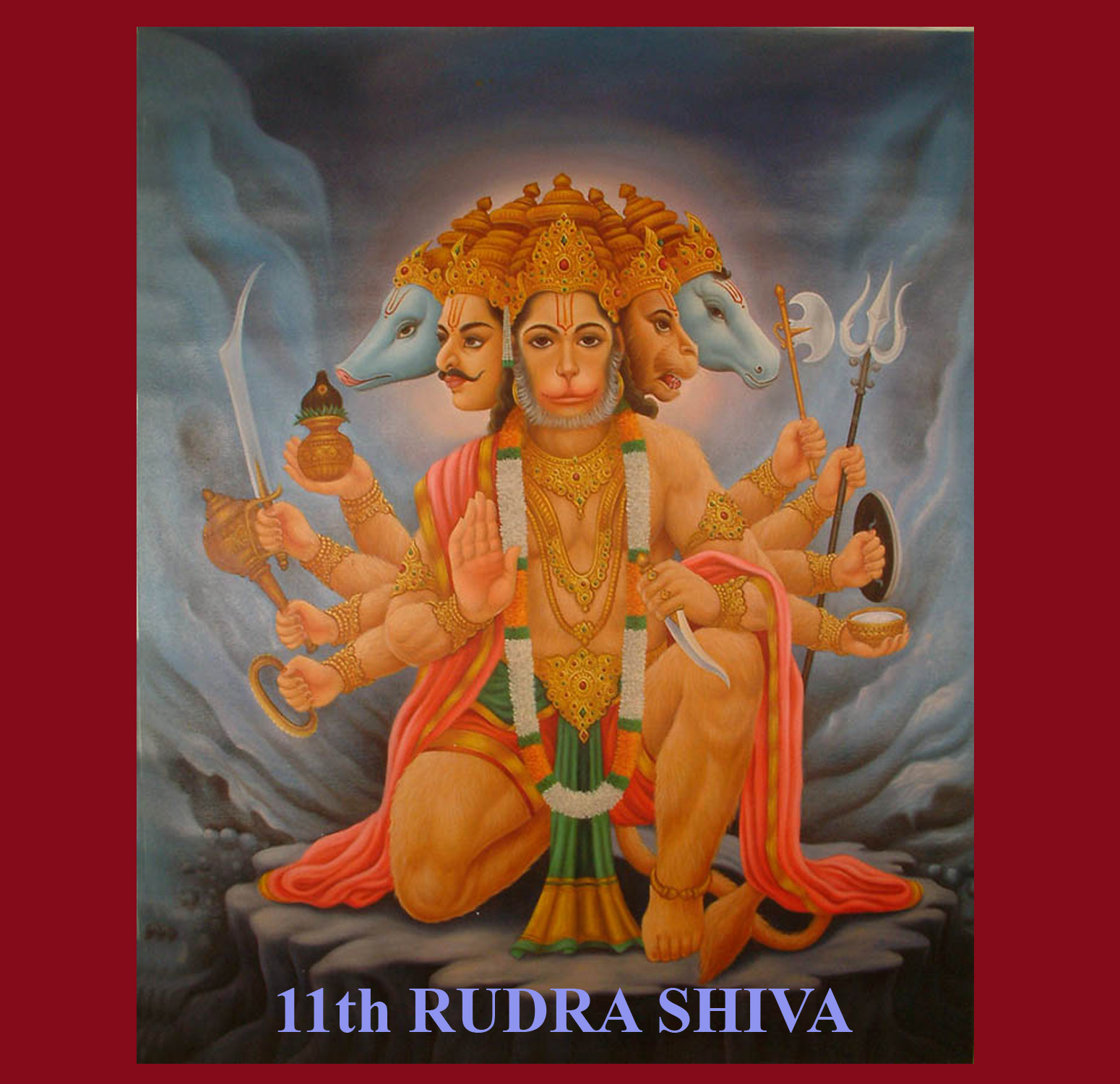
Five-faced or Panchamukhi Hanuman: Hanuman face, man-lion face, Garuda face, Boar face, Horse face. It is found in esoteric tantric traditions that weave Vaishvana and Shaiva ideas, and is relatively uncommon.

The earliest known sculptures of Hanuman date from the Gupta Empire ca. 500 CE. In these very early representations, Hanuman is not yet shown as a sole figure. Free standing murtis or statues of Hanuman appeared from ca. 700 CE. onwards. These murtis portrayed Hanuman with one hand raised, one foot suppressing a demon, and an erect tail. In later centuries his raised hand was sometimes shown supporting a mountain of healing herbs.

Hanuman's iconography is most commonly derived from Valmiki's Ramayana. He is usually portrayed with other central figures of the Ramayana – Rama, Sita and Lakshmana. He carries weapons such as a gada (mace) and thunderbolt (vajra). In the Hanuman Chalisa, a 16th century song written by Tulsidas, he is described as golden in color, wearing beautiful clothes and earrings, and having thick, curly hair. Tulsidas through the Hanuman Chalisa also describes him as having a mace and flag in his hands.

His iconography and temples are common today. He is typically shown with Rama, Sita and Lakshmana, near or in Vaishnavism temples, as well as by himself usually opening his chest to symbolically show images of Rama and Sita near his heart. He is also popular among the followers of Shaivism.

In north India, an iconic representation of Hanuman such as a round stone has been in use by yogis, as a means to help focus on the abstract aspects of him.

== Temples and shrines ==
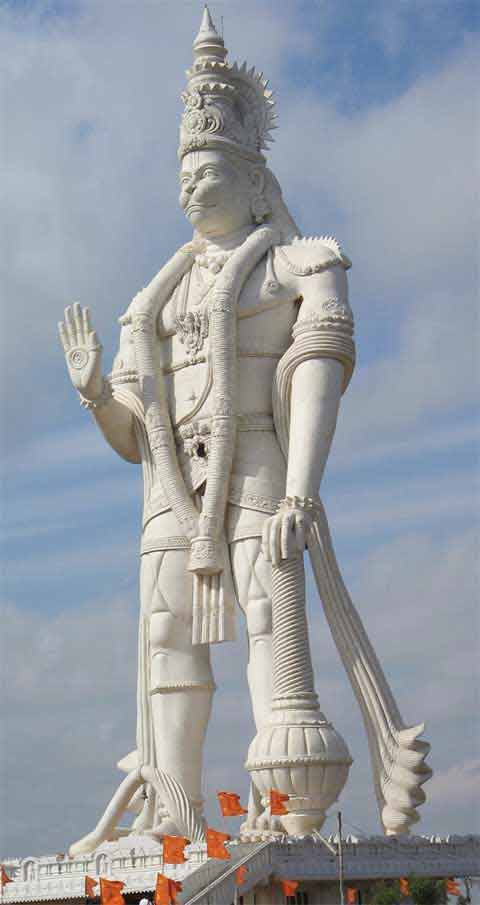
41-meter-high (135 ft) Hanuman monument at Paritala, Andhra Pradesh

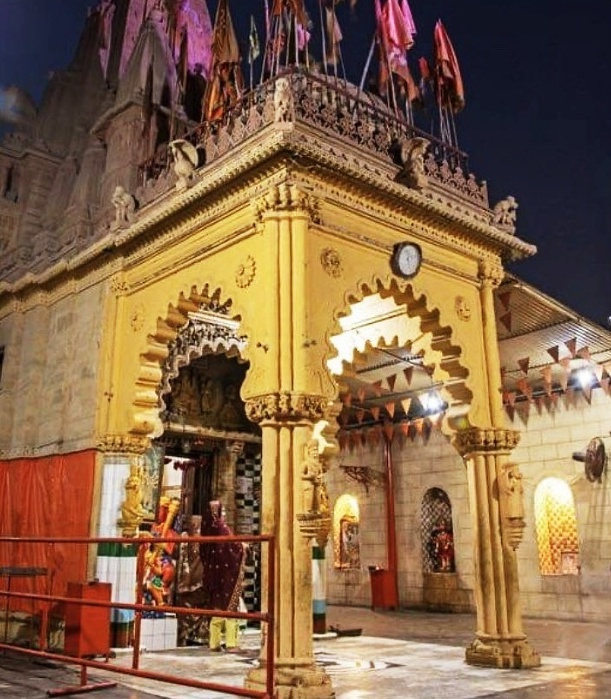
Panchmukhi Hanuman Temple in Karachi, Pakistan, is the only temple in the world which has a natural statue of Hanuman

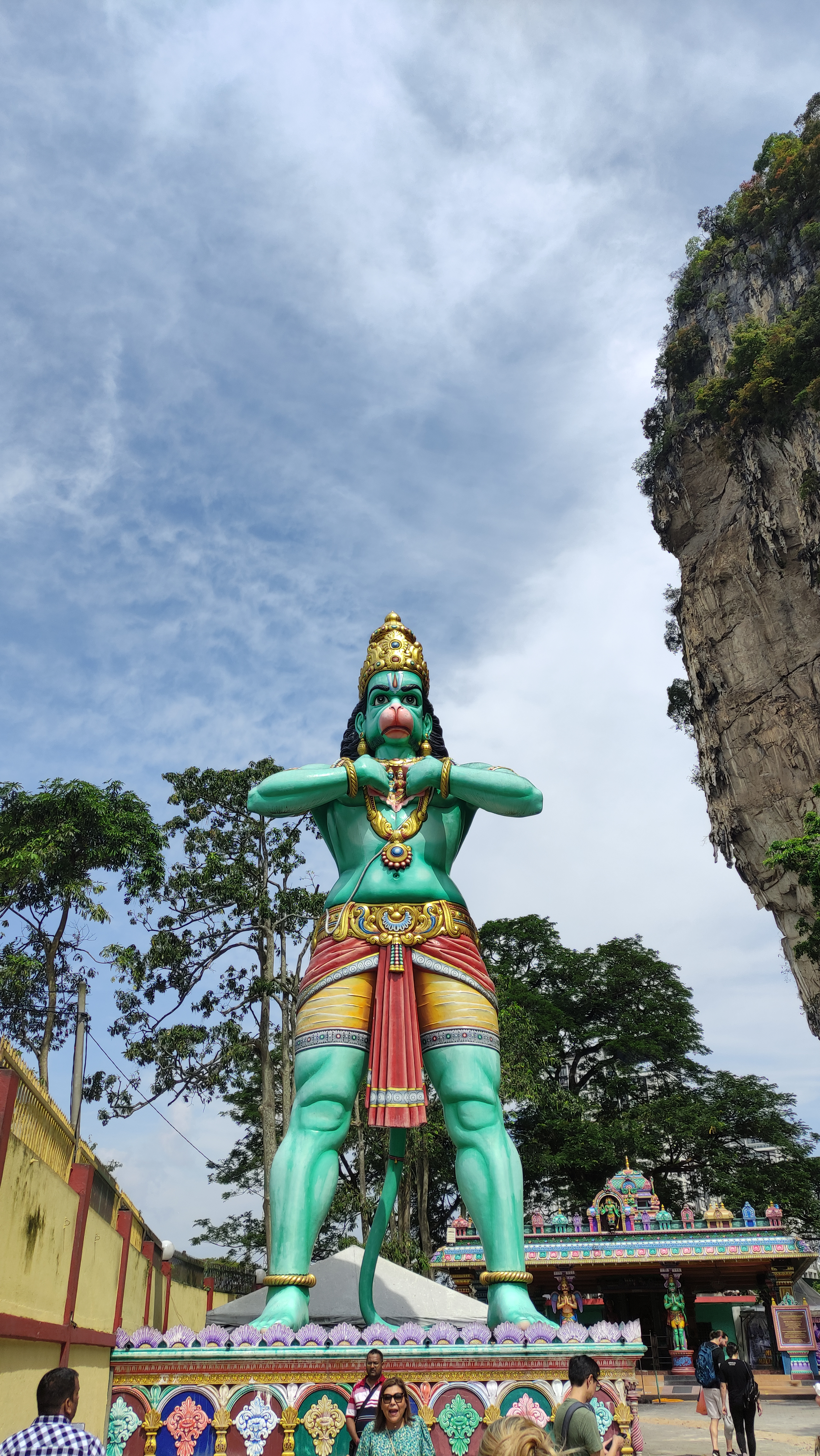
The green Hanuman statue in Batu Caves, Malaysia

Hanuman is often worshipped along with Rama and Sita of Vaishnavism, and sometimes independently of them. There are numerous statues to celebrate and temples to worship Hanuman all over India. Vaishnavites, adherents of Vishnu, hold that the wind god Vayu manifested in three distinct incarnations to aid Vishnu. In his incarnation as Hanuman, he supported Rama; as Bhima, he assisted Krishna; and as Madhvacharya (1238–1317), he established the Vaishnava sect known as Dvaita. Shaivites claim him as an avatar of Shiva. Hanuman's identification as one of the eleven Rudras may reflect a Shaiva sectarian claim on an increasingly popular god, suggesting his kinship with, and hence potential control over, a class of awesome and ambivalent deities. Hanuman's other abilities are rooted in his divine heritage as the son of Vayu, the Wind God. Some scholars state that the earliest Hanuman murtis appeared in the 8th century, but verifiable evidence of Hanuman images and inscriptions first appear in the 10th century in Indian monasteries in central and north India.

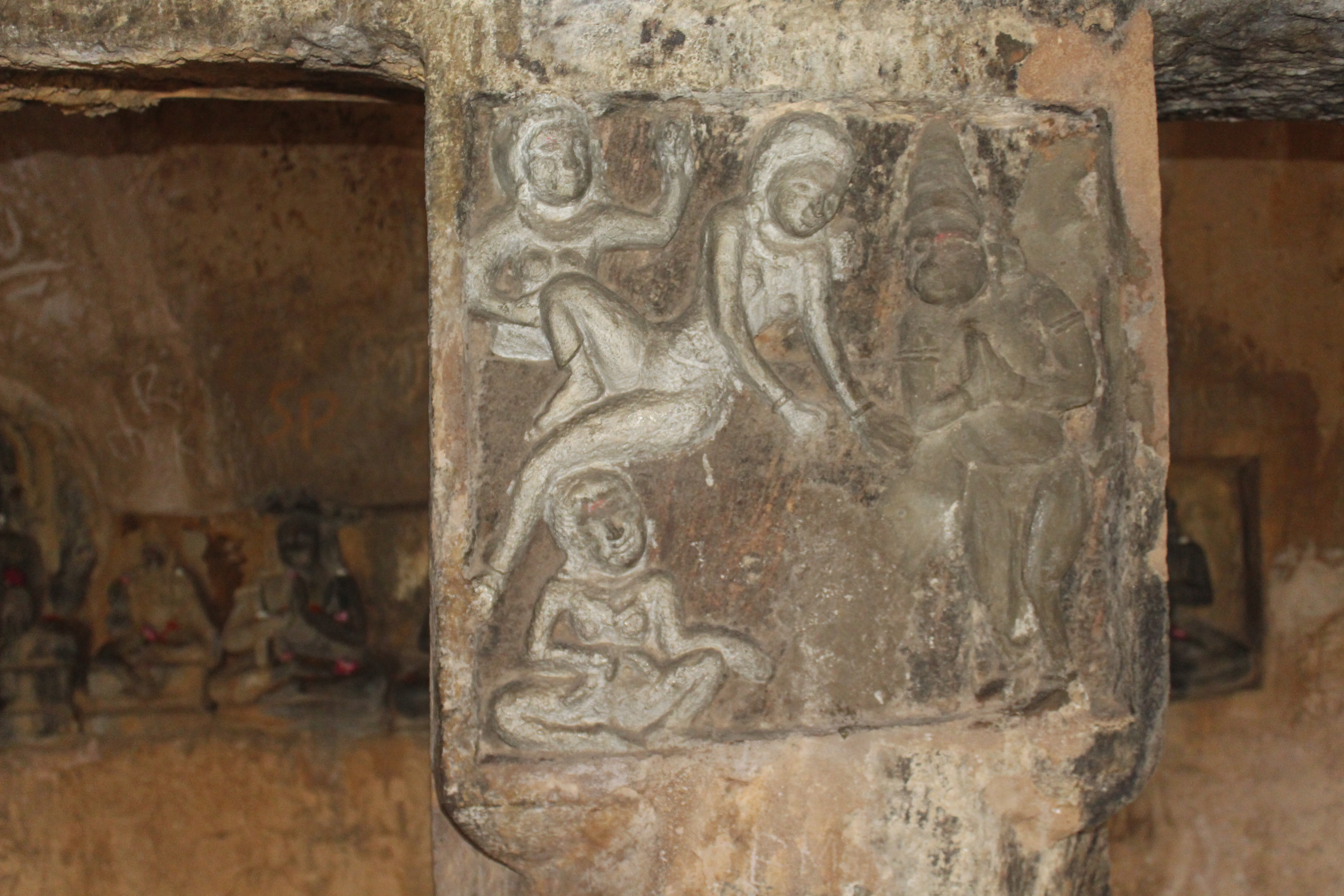
Wall carvings depicting the worship of Hanuman at Undavalli Caves in Guntur district

Tuesday and Saturday of every week are particularly popular days at Hanuman temples. Some Hindus keep a partial or full fast on either of those two days and remember Hanuman and the theology he represents to them.

Major temples and shrines of Hanuman include:

- The oldest known independent Hanuman temple and statue is at Khajuraho, dated to about 922 CE from the Khajuraho Hanuman inscription.
- Hanumangarhi, Ayodhya, is a 10th-century temple dedicated to Hanuman.
- Panchmukhi Hanuman Temple is a 1,500-year-old temple in Pakistan. It is located in Soldier Bazaar in Karachi. The temple is highly venerated by Pakistani Hindus as it is the only temple in the world which has a natural statue of Hanuman that is not man-made (Swayambhu).
- Jakhu temple in Shimla, Himachal Pradesh contains a monumental 108-foot (33-metre) statue of Hanuman and is the highest point in Shimla.
- The tallest Hanuman statue is the Veera Abhaya Anjaneya Swami, standing 135 feet tall at Paritala, 32 km from Vijayawada in Andhra Pradesh, installed in 2003.
- Chitrakoot in Madhya Pradesh features the Hanuman Dhara temple, which features a panchmukhi statue of Hanuman. It is located inside a forest, and it along with Ramghat that is a few kilometers away, are significant Hindu pilgrimage sites.
- The Peshwa era rulers in the 18th-century city of Pune provided endowments to more Hanuman temples than to temples of other deities such as Shiva, Ganesh or Vitthal. Even in present time there are more Hanuman temples in the city and the district than of other deities.
- One of the major temples of Hanuman is Hanuman Temple Salangpur in based in Salangpur, Gujarat. There is also a statue of Hanuman which is 54 ft tall.

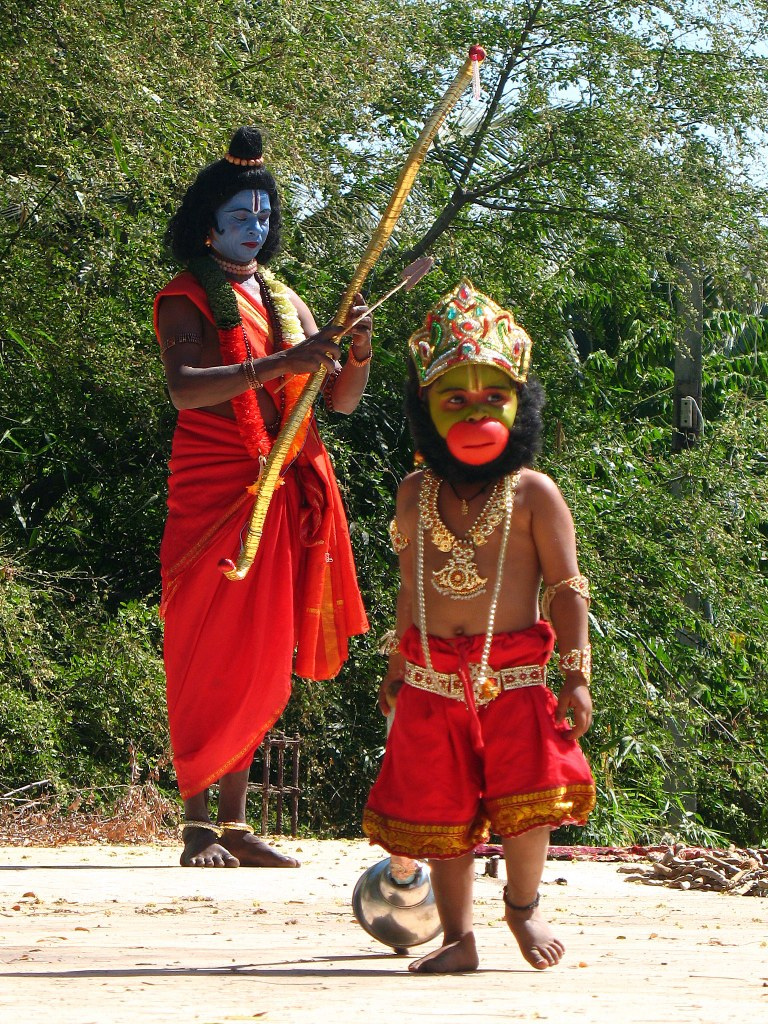
In India, the annual autumn season Ramlila play features Hanuman, enacted during Navratri by rural artists (above).

- A major Hanuman statue has been built by Tamil Hindus near the Batu caves in Malaysia.
- An 85-foot (26 m) Karya Siddhi Hanuman statue by colonial era Hindu indentured workers' descendants at Carapichaima in Trinidad and Tobago.
- Another Karya Siddhi Hanuman Temple has been built in Frisco, Texas, in the United States.
- In 2024, another Hanuman statue was inaugurated in Texas with the name Statue of Union, which is now the fourth-tallest statue in the US.

=== Festivals and celebrations ===
Hanuman is a central figure in the annual Ramlila celebrations in India, and seasonal dramatic arts in southeast Asia, particularly in Thailand; and Bali and Java, Indonesia. Ramlila is a dramatic folk re-enactment of the life of Rama according to the ancient Hindu epic Ramayana or secondary literature based on it such as the Ramcharitmanas. It particularly refers to the thousands of dramatic plays and dance events that are staged during the annual autumn festival of Navratri in India. Hanuman is featured in many parts of the folk-enacted play of the lmythological war between Good and Evil, with the celebrations climaxing in Vijayadashami.

The Ramlila festivities were declared by UNESCO as one of the "Intangible Cultural Heritages of Humanity" in 2008. Ramlila is particularly notable in the historically important Hindu cities of Ayodhya, Varanasi, Vrindavan, Almora, Satna and Madhubani – cities in Uttar Pradesh, Uttarakhand, Bihar and Madhya Pradesh.

Hanuman's birthday is observed by some Hindus as Hanuman Jayanti. It falls in much of India in the traditional month of Chaitra in the lunisolar Hindu calendar, which overlaps with March and April. However, in parts of Kerala and Tamil Nadu, Hanuman Jayanti is observed in the regional Hindu month of Mārgaḻi, which overlaps with December and January. The festive day is observed with devotees gathering at Hanuman temples before sunrise, and day-long spiritual recitations and story reading about the victory of good over evil.

In Lucknow, Bada Mangal, a festival dedicated to Hanuman, is celebrated every Tuesday during the Hindu month of Jyeshtha, which overlaps with May and June. It is observed across all Hanuman temples across the city, with an estimated 3,000 bhandaras held to distribute food and refreshments to devotees.

== Hanuman in Southeast Asia ==
=== Cambodia ===
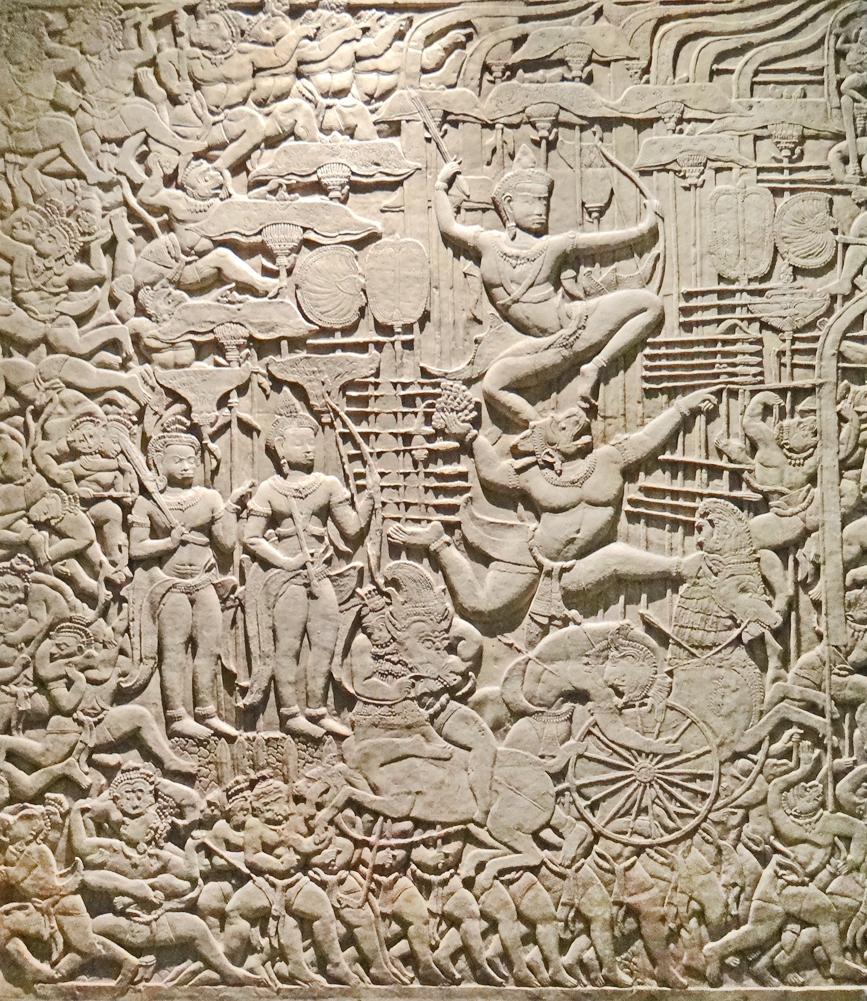
Cambodian depiction of Hanuman at Angkor Wat. Rama is standing on top of Hanuman in the middle of the mural.

Hanuman is a revered heroic figure in Khmer history in southeast Asia. He features predominantly in the Reamker, a Cambodian epic poem, based on the Sanskrit Itihasa Ramayana epic. Intricate carvings on the walls of Angkor Wat depict scenes from the Ramayana including those of Hanuman.

In Cambodia and many other parts of southeast Asia, mask dance and shadow theatre arts celebrate Hanuman with Ream (same as Rama of India). Hanuman is represented by a white mask. Particularly popular in southeast Asian theatre are Hanuman's accomplishments as a martial artist Ramayana.

=== Indonesia ===
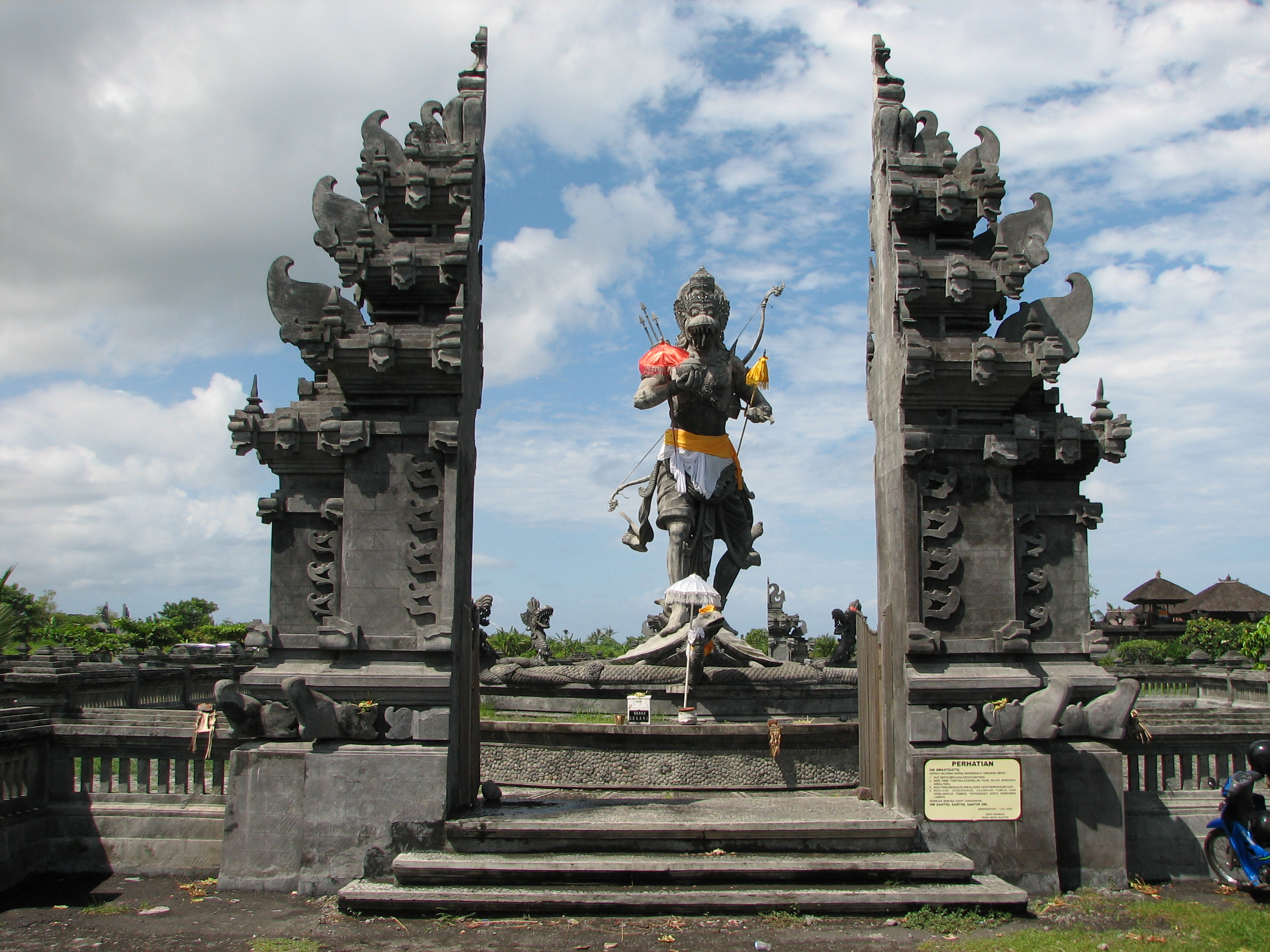
Hanuman statue at Bali, Indonesia

Hanuman (Indonesian: Hanoman or Anoman ) is the central figure in many of the historic dance and drama art works such as Wayang Wong found in Javanese culture, Indonesia. These performance arts can be traced to at least the 10th century. He has been popular, along with the local versions of Ramayana in other islands of Indonesia such as Java.

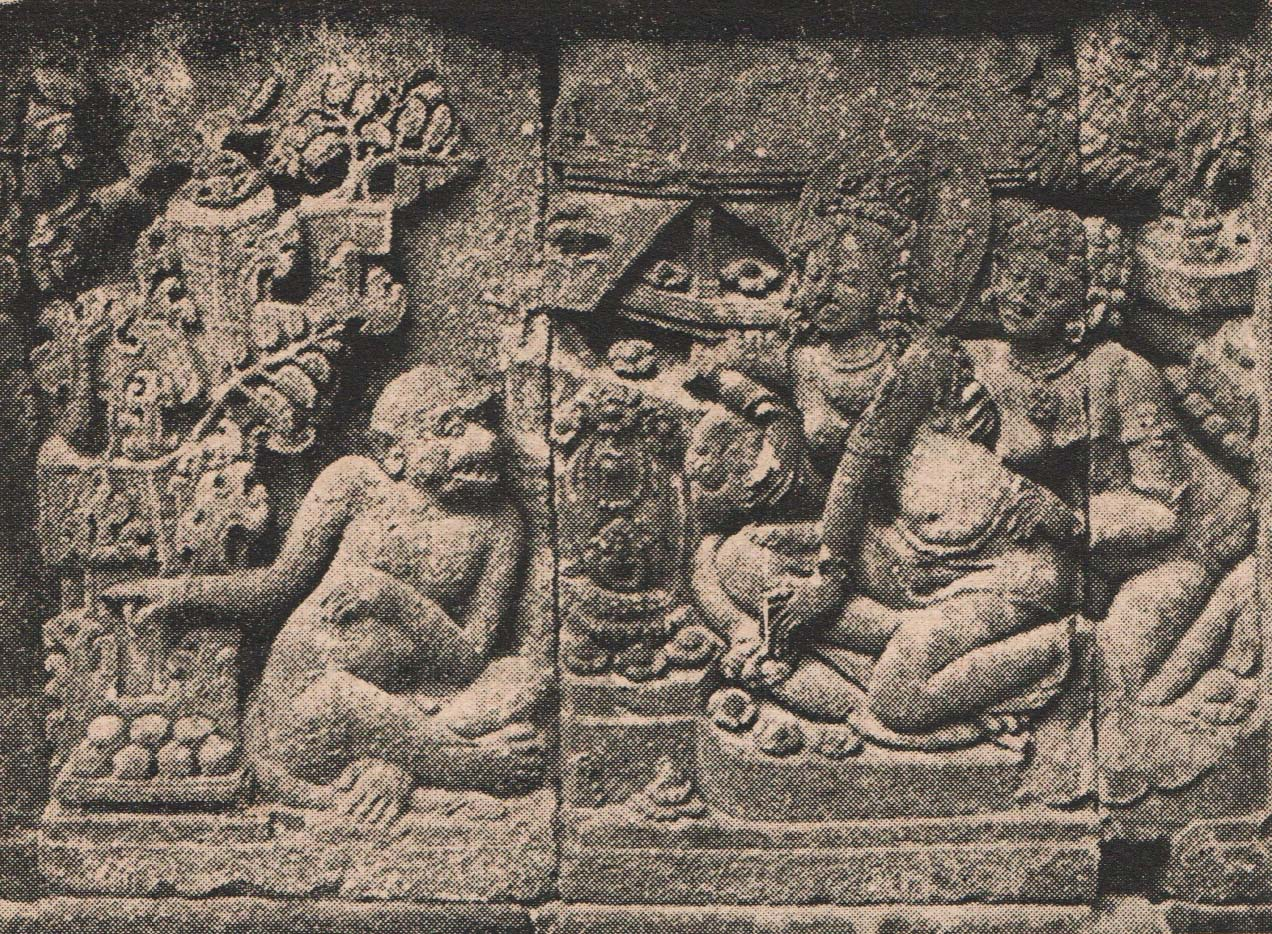
Hanuman relief in Prambanan temple, Indonesia

In major medieval era Hindu temples, archeological sites and manuscripts discovered in Indonesian and Malay islands, Hanuman features prominently along with Rama, Sita, Lakshmana, Vishvamitra and Sugriva. The most studied and detailed relief artworks are found in the Candis Panataran and Prambanan.

Hanuman, along with other figures of the Ramayana, are an important source of plays and dance theatre repertoire at Odalan celebrations and other festivals in Bali.

==== Wayang story ====
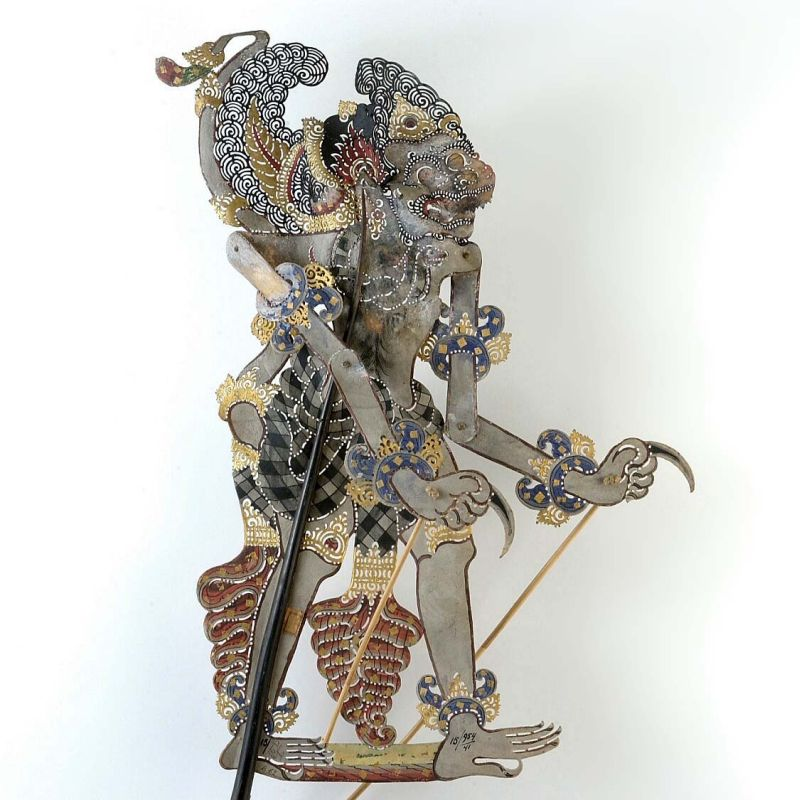
Hanuman wayang (puppetry) in Indonesian culture

Hanoman in Javanese wayang is the son of Batara Guru who became the disciple and adopted son of Batara Bayu. Hanoman himself is a cross-generational figure from the time of Rama to the time of Jayabaya. Anjani is the eldest daughter of Rishi Gotama who is cursed so that she has the face of an ape. On the orders of his father, he was imprisoned naked in the lake Madirda. Once upon a time, Batara Guru and Batara Narada flew across the sky. When he saw Anjani, Batara Guru was so amazed that he released semen. The king of the puppet gods rubbed it with tamarind leaves and threw it into the lake. The sinom leaf fell on Anjani's lap. She also picked it up and ate it until she became pregnant. When it was time to give birth, Anjani was assisted by the angels sent by Batara Guru. She gave birth to a baby monkey with white hair, while herself again had a beautiful face and was taken to heaven as an angel.

The baby, in the form of a white monkey, which is Anjani's son, was taken by Batara Bayu and adopted as a child. After completing his education, Hanoman returned to the world and served his uncle, Sugriwa, the monkey king of Kiskenda Cave. At that time, Sugriwa had just been defeated by his brother, Subali, another uncle of Hanoman. Hanoman managed to meet Rama and Laksmana, a pair of princes from Ayodhya who were undergoing exile. The two then work together with Sugriwa to defeat Subali, and together attack the land of Alengka to free Sita, Rama's wife who was kidnapped by Rahwana, Subali's disciple.

Hanoman infiltrates the Alengka palace to investigate Ravana's power and witness Sita's plight. There he made such a mess that he was caught and burned. Instead, Hanoman actually managed to burn parts of the capital city of Alengka. This event is known as Hanuman Obong. After Hanoman returned to Rama's place, the monkey army set out to attack Alengka. Hanoman appears as a hero who kills many Alengka troops, for example Surpanaka (Sarpakenaka) Ravana's younger brother. In the final battle between Rama and Ravana, he was overwhelmed with his Aji Pancasu, the ability to live eternally. Every time Rama's weapon killed Ravana, immediately Ravana rose again. Wibisana, Ravana's sister who sided with Rama immediately asked Hanoman to help. Hanoman also lifted Mount Ungaran to fall on top of Ravana's corpse when Ravana had just died at the hands of Rama for the umpteenth time. Seeing Hanuman's impudence, Rama also punished him to guard Ravana's grave. Rama believes that Ravana is still alive under the crush of the mountain, and at any time can release his spirit to wreak havoc in the world.

Several years later after Rama died, Ravana's spirit escaped from Mount Pati and went to Sumatra Island to seek the reincarnation of Sita, namely Subhadra, Krishna's sister. Krishna himself is the reincarnation of Rama. Hanoman chases and meets Bima, his younger brother and Bayu's adopted son. Hanuman then served Krishna. He also managed to capture the spirit of Ravana and imprisoned him in Mount Kendalisada. On the mountain Hanoman acts as a hermit.

Unlike the original version, Hanoman in the wayang has two children. The first is named Trigangga who is in the form of a white ape like himself. It is said that when he came home from burning Alengka, Hanoman had the image of Trijata's face, Wibisana's daughter, who took care of Sita. Over the ocean, Hanuman's semen fell and caused the seawater to boil. Unbeknownst to him, Baruna created the foam into Trigangga. Trigangga immediately grew up and met Bukbis, the son of Ravana. The two are friends and sided with Alengka against Rama. In the war Trigangga managed to kidnap Rama and Laksmana but was chased by Hanoman. Narada came down to intervene and explained the blood relationship between the two white monkeys. Finally, Trigangga turned against Ravana.

Hanuman's second son was named Purwaganti, who had only appeared in the Pandavas era. He was credited with finding Yudhisthira's lost heirloom named Kalimasada. Purwaganti was born to a priest's daughter whom Hanoman married, named Purwati. Hanuman lived so long that he was tired of living. Narada descends to grant his wish, which is to die, as long as he can complete the final task, which is to reconcile the six descendants of Arjuna who are involved in a civil war. Hanoman disguised himself as Resi Mayangkara and succeeded in marrying Astradarma, son of Sariwahana, to Pramesti, daughter of Jayabaya. The Sariwahana family and Jayabaya were involved in a dispute even though they were both descendants of Arjuna. Hanoman then appeared to face Jayabaya's enemy named Yaksadewa, the king of Selahuma. In that war, Hanuman died, moksha with his body, while Yaksadewa returned to his original form, namely Batara Kala, the god of death.

=== Thailand ===
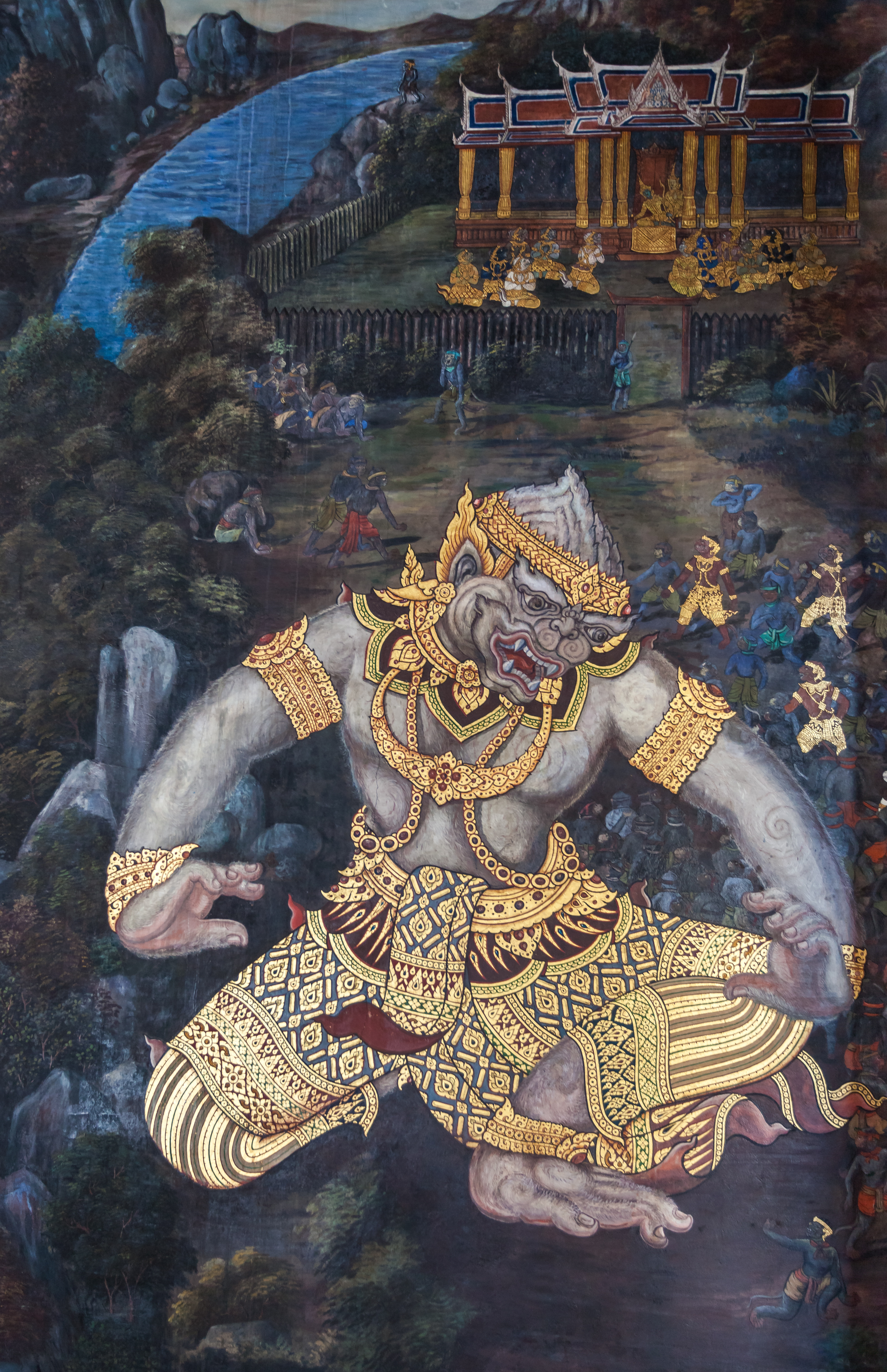
Thai iconography of Hanuman. He is one of the most popular figures in the Ramakien.

Hanuman plays a significantly more prominent role in the Ramakien. In contrast to the strict devoted lifestyle to Rama of his Indian counterpart, Hanuman is known in Thailand as a promiscuous and flirtatious figure. One famous episode of the Ramakien has him fall in love with the mermaid Suvannamaccha and fathering Macchanu with her. In another, Hanuman takes on the form of Ravana and sleeps with Mandodari, Ravana's consort, thus destroying her chastity, which was the last protection for Ravana's life.

As in the Indian tradition, Hanuman is the patron of martial arts and an example of courage, fortitude and excellence in Thailand. He is depicted as wearing a crown on his head and armor. He is depicted as an albino with a strong character, open mouth, and sometimes is shown carrying a trident.

Hanuman is the mascot of the 1st Asian Martial Arts Games in Bangkok, Thailand.

== Lineage ==
Though Hanuman is described to be celibate in the Ramayana and most of the Puranas, according to some regional sources, Hanuman married Suvarchala, the daughter of Surya (Sun-God).

However, once Hanuman was flying above the seas to go to Lanka, a drop of his sweat fell in the mouth of a crocodile, which eventually turned into a baby. The monkey baby was delivered by the crocodile, who was soon retrieved by Ahiravana, and raised by him, named Makardhwaja, and made the guard of the gates of Patala, the former's kingdom. One day, Hanuman, when going to save Rama and Lakshmana from Ahiravana, faced Makardhwaja and defeated him in combat. Later, after knowing the reality and after saving him, he made his son the king of Patala.

The Jethwa clan claims to be a descendant of Makardhwaja, and, according to them, he had a son named Modh-dhwaja, who in turn had a son named Jeth-dhwaja, hence the name of the clan.

== In popular culture ==
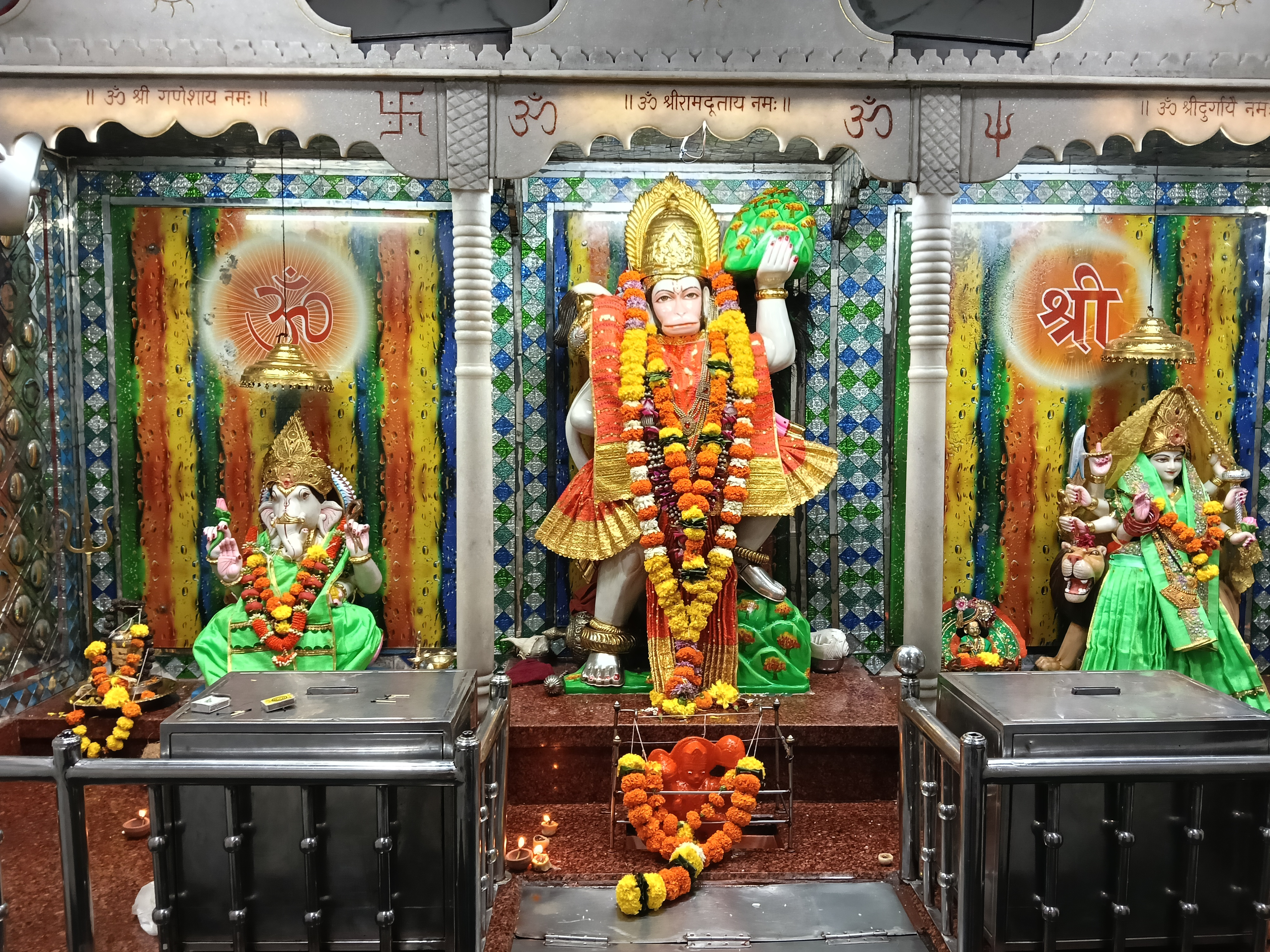
Darbar of Lord Hanuman at the temple in Koparigaon Vashi in Navi Mumbai

While Hanuman is a quintessential character of any movie on Ramayana, Hanuman-centric movies have also been produced with Hanuman as the central character. In 1976, the first biopic movie on Hanuman in Hindi was released with wrestler Dara Singh playing the role of Hanuman. He again reprised the character in Ramanand Sagar's television series Ramayan and B. R. Chopra's Mahabharat. The TV series Jai Hanuman was released in 1997 on Doordarshan.

In 2005, an animated movie of the same name was released and was extremely popular among children. Actor Mukesh Khanna voiced the character of Hanuman in the film. Following this, several series of movies featuring the god were produced, though all of them were animated, prominent ones being the Bal Hanuman series 2006–2012. Another movie, Maruti Mera dost, (2009) was a contemporary adaptation of Hanuman in modern times.

The 2015 Bollywood movie Bajrangi Bhaijaan had Salman Khan playing the role of Pawan Kumar Chaturvedi, who is an ardent Hanuman devotee and regularly invokes him for his protection, courage, and strength.

US president Barack Obama had a habit of carrying with him a few small items given to him by people he had met. The items included a small figurine of Hanuman.

Hanuman was referenced in the 2018 Marvel Cinematic Universe film Black Panther and its 2022 sequel Black Panther: Wakanda Forever, which are set in the fictional African nation of Wakanda; the Jabari tribe often is seen saying "Glory to Hanuman" as the tribe worships its ancestral gorilla deity. The reference was removed from the film in theatre screenings in India, but the uncensored part came out later on digital streaming platforms in the country.

The Mexican acoustic-metal duo Rodrigo Y Gabriela released a hit single named "Hanuman" from their album 11:11. Each song on the album was made to pay tribute to a different musician that inspired the band, and the song "Hanuman" is dedicated to Carlos Santana. The reason for the band using the name Hanuman is unclear, but the artists have stated that Santana "was a role model for musicians back in Mexico that it was possible to do great music and be an international musician."

Hanuman is the protagonist in the 2022 film Hanuman White Monkey, a fantasy film that combines special effects with a Khon (Thai masked pantomime) performance style. In the 2022 action-adventure Ram Setu, it is implied that the character "AP" is actually Hanuman. In 2024, Telugu film director Prasanth Varma directed the film Hanu-Man, a superhero film based on Hanuman's power. The film's sequel, Jai Hanuman, was initially scheduled for release during the Sankranti festival of 2025, but the release has since been postponed due to Rishab Shetty’s commitments to Kantara: Chapter 1, and the film is now expected to release in 2026.

In April 2024, Dev Patel wrote and directed his first film, Monkey Man, which alludes to Hanuman's journey of discovering his own strength. The film focuses on the modern day corruption of India and "underdogs challenging the untouchable status quo". The film's characters and story arc were inspired by stories of Hanuman that Patel heard from his grandfather, as well as Korean and Indian cinema.

== Literature ==
The Sapta Chiranjivi Stotram is a mantra that is featured in Hindu literature:

अश्वत्थामा बलिर्व्यासो हनुमांश्च विभीषण:।
कृप: परशुरामश्च सप्तैतै चिरञ्जीविन:॥
सप्तैतान् संस्मरेन्नित्यं मार्कण्डेयमथाष्टमम्।
जीवेद्वर्षशतं सोपि सर्वव्याधिविवर्जितः॥ aśvatthāmā balirvyāsō hanumāṁśca vibhīṣaṇaḥ।
kṛpaḥ paraśurāmaśca saptaitai cirañjīvinaḥ॥
saptaitān saṁsmarēnnityaṁ mārkaṇḍēyamathāṣṭamam।
jīvēdvarṣaśataṁ sopi sarvavyādhivivarjitaḥ॥

— Sapta Chiranjivi Stotram

The mantra states that the remembrance of the eight immortals (Ashwatthama, Mahabali, Vyasa, Hanuman, Vibhishana, Kripa, Parashurama, and Markandeya) offers one freedom from ailments and longevity.

== See also ==
- Hanuman temples
- Vayu Stuti
- Hanuman Chalisa
- Hanuman Jayanti
- Hanumanasana, an asana named after Hanuman
- The 6 Ultra Brothers vs. the Monster Army
- Hanuman and the Five Riders
- Gray langur, also known as the Hanuman langur
- Sun Wukong, a Chinese literary character in Wu Cheng'en's masterpiece Journey to the West
