= List of science fiction films of the 1970s =

This is a list of science fiction films released in the 1970s. These 235 films include core elements of science fiction, but can cross into other genres. They have been released to a cinema audience by the commercial film industry and are widely distributed with reviews by reputable critics.

During the 1970s, blockbuster science fiction films, which reached a much larger audience than previously, began to make their appearance. The financial success of these films resulted in heavy investment in special effects by the American film industry, leading to big-budget, heavily marketed science fiction film releases during the 1990s. Collectively, the science fiction films from the 1970s received 11 Academy Awards, 10 Saturn Awards, six Hugo Awards, three Nebula Awards and two Grammy Awards. Two of these films, Star Wars (1977, currently known as Star Wars Episode IV: A New Hope) and Superman (1978), were the highest-grossing films of their respective years of release.

== List ==
1970
Title	Director	Cast	Country	Notes
Assignment: Terror	Hugo Fregonese Tulio Demicheli	Paul Naschy, Michael Rennie, Karin Dor, Craig Hill	Spain; West Germany; Italy	
Beast of Blood	Eddie Romero	John Ashley, Celeste Yarnall, Eddie Garcia, Liza Belmonte	Philippines	
Beneath the Planet of the Apes	Ted Post	James Franciscus, Kim Hunter, Maurice Evans	United States	
Colossus: The Forbin Project	Joseph Sargent	Eric Braeden, Susan Clark, Gordon Pinsent	United States	
Crimes of the Future	David Cronenberg	Ronald Mlodzik, Jon Lidolt, Tania Zolty	Canada	
Dr. Jekyll and Sister Hyde	Roy Ward Baker	Ralph Bates, Martine Beswick, Gerald Sim, Lewis Fiander	United Kingdom	
Gamera vs. Jiger	Noriaki Yuasa	Tsutomu Takakuwa, Kelly Varis, Katherine Murphy	Japan	
Gas-s-s-s	Roger Corman	Robert Corff, Elaine Giftos, Bud Cort	United States	
Horror of the Blood Monsters	Al Adamson	John Carradine, Robert Dix, Vicki Volante, Joey Benson	United States	
The Horror of Frankenstein	Jimmy Sangster	Ralph Bates, Kate O'Mara, Veronica Carlson	United Kingdom	
I Killed Einstein, Gentlemen	Oldřich Lipský	Jiří Sovák, Jana Brejchová, Lubomír Lipský	Czechoslovakia	
The Mind of Mr. Soames	Alan Cooke	Terence Stamp, Robert Vaughn, Nigel Davenport	United Kingdom; United States	
No Blade of Grass	Cornel Wilde	Nigel Davenport, Jean Wallace, John Hamill	United States; United Kingdom	
On the Comet	Karel Zeman	Emil Horváth, Magda Vášáryová, František Filipovský	Czechoslovakia	
Scream and Scream Again	Gordon Hessler	Vincent Price, Christopher Lee, Peter Cushing	United Kingdom	
Signals – A Space Adventure	Gottfried Kolditz	Piotr Pawłowski, Yevgeniy Zharikov, Gojko Mitić	East Germany; Poland	
Space Amoeba	Ishirō Honda	Akira Kubo, Atsuko Takahashi, Yukiko Kobayashi	Japan	
Toomorrow	Val Guest	Olivia Newton-John, Benny Thomas, Vic Cooper	Switzerland, United Kingdom	
Trog	Freddie Francis	Joan Crawford, Michael Gough, Bernard Kay, Kim Braden	United Kingdom	
When Dinosaurs Ruled the Earth	Val Guest	Victoria Vetri, Robin Hawdon, Patrick Allen	United Kingdom; United States	
1971
Title	Director	Cast	Country	Subgenre/notes
The Andromeda Strain	Robert Wise	James Olson, Arthur Hill	United States	
The Blue Planet	Viktor Chugunov		Soviet Union	Romance
A Clockwork Orange	Stanley Kubrick	Malcolm McDowell, Patrick Magee, Michael Bates	United Kingdom; United States	
Escape from the Planet of the Apes	Don Taylor	Roddy McDowall, Kim Hunter, Bradford Dillman	United States	
Gamera vs. Zigra	Noriaki Yuasa	Koji Fujiyama, Daigo Inoue, Reiko Kasahara	Japan	
Glen and Randa	Jim McBride	Steven Curry, Shelley Plimpton, Woody Chambliss	United States	
Godzilla vs. Hedorah	Yoshimitsu Banno	Akira Yamauchi, Toshie Kimura, Hiroyuki Kawase	Japan	
The Incredible 2-Headed Transplant	Anthony Lanza	Bruce Dern, Patricia Ann Priest	United States	
The Million Dollar Duck	Vincent McEveety	Dean Jones, Sandy Duncan, Joe Flynn	United States	
Octaman	Harry Essex	Pier Angeli, Kerwin Mathews, Jeff Morrow, David Essex	Mexico United States	
The Omega Man	Boris Sagal	Charlton Heston, Anthony Zerbe, Rosalind Cash	United States	
Out of the Darkness	Chatrichalerm Yukol	Sorapong Chatree	Thailand	
Quest for Love	Ralph Thomas	Joan Collins, Tom Bell, Denholm Elliott	United Kingdom	
The Resurrection of Zachary Wheeler	Bob Wynn	Leslie Nielsen, Bradford Dillman, James Daly	United States	
THX 1138	George Lucas	Robert Duvall, Donald Pleasence, Don Pedro Colley	United States	
You Are a Widow, Sir	Václav Vorlíček	Iva Janžurová, Olga Schoberová, Eduard Cupák	Czechoslovakia	
1972
Title	Director	Cast	Country	Subgenre/notes
93° Tunnel	Claudinê Perina Camargo		Brazil	Super 8 eco-dystopian film. Portuguese title: Túnel 93°.
The Asphyx	Peter Newbrook	Robert Stephens, Robert Powell, Jane Lapotaire, Alex Scott	United Kingdom	Sci fi horror
Beware! The Blob	Larry Hagman	Robert Walker Jr., Gwynne Gilford, Richard Stahl	United States	Comedy horror
The Boy Who Turned Yellow	Michael Powell	Mark Dightam, Robert Eddison, Helen Weir	United Kingdom	Adventure family fantasy
Conquest of the Planet of the Apes	J. Lee Thompson	Roddy McDowall, Don Murray, Ricardo Montalbán	United States	Action
Doomsday Machine	Herbert J. Leder	Bobby Van, Ruta Lee, Mala Powers	United States	
Doomwatch	Peter Sasdy	Ian Bannen, Judy Geeson, John Paul	United Kingdom	Horror mystery thriller
Eolomea	Herrmann Zschoche	Cox Habbema, Ivan Andonov, Rolf Hoppe	East Germany; Soviet Union; Bulgaria	Drama romance
Godzilla vs. Gigan (a.k.a. Chikyû kogeki meirei: Gojira tai Gaigan)	Jun Fukuda	Hiroshi Ishikawa, Yuriko Hishimi, Minoru Takashima	Japan	Action adventure family kaiju
The Groundstar Conspiracy	Lamont Johnson	George Peppard, Michael Sarrazin, Christine Belford	Canada; United States	Action crime mystery romance thriller
The Happiness Cage (a.k.a. The Mind Snatchers)	Bernard Girard	Christopher Walken, Joss Ackland, Ralph Meeker	Denmark; United States	Drama
Horror Express (a.k.a. Pánico en el Transiberiano)	Eugenio Martín	Telly Savalas, Christopher Lee, Peter Cushing	Spain; United Kingdom	Adventure horror thriller
Love 2002 (a.k.a. Liebe 2002)	Joachim Hellwig	Chris Wallasch, Susan Baker, Emöke Pöstenyi	East Germany	Science fiction/documentary hybrid short film
Man with the Transplanted Brain (L'homme au cerveau greffé)	Jacques Doniol-Valcroze	Mathieu Carrière, Nicoletta Machiavelli, Marianne Eggerickx, Michel Duchaussoy	France; Italy; West Germany	Drama horror thriller
Night of the Lepus	William F. Claxton	Stuart Whitman, Janet Leigh, Rory Calhoun	United States	Horror thriller
Now You See Him, Now You Don't	Robert Butler	Kurt Russell, Cesar Romero, Joe Flynn	United States	Comedy family
Phaethon - The Son of the Sun (a.k.a. Фаэтон - сын Солнца)	Vasiliy Livanov	Mariya Babanova (voice), Aleksey Konsovskiy (voice), Yuriy Yakovlev (voice)	Soviet Union	Animated short film
Silent Running	Douglas Trumbull	Bruce Dern, Cliff Potts, Ron Rifkin	United States	Drama
Slaughterhouse-Five	George Roy Hill	Michael Sacks, Ron Leibman, Eugene Roche	United States	Comedy drama war (Note: Won a Hugo Award for Best Dramatic Presentation and a Saturn Award for Best Science Fiction Film.)
Solaris (a.k.a. Solyaris)	Andrey Tarkovskiy	Natal'ya Bondarchuk, Donatas Banionis, Jüri Järvet	Soviet Union	Drama mystery (Note: Winner of the Grand Prize of the Jury and the FIPRESCI Prize at the Cannes Film Festival.)
Superbeast	George Schenck	Antoinette Bower, Craig Littler, Harry Lauter, Vic Díaz	United States	
The Thing with Two Heads	Lee Frost	Rosey Grier, Ray Milland, Don Marshall	United States	Comedy
The Twilight People	Eddie Romero	Pam Grier, John Ashley, Pat Woodell, Jan Merlin	Philippines; United States	Adventure horror
ZPG	Michael Campus	Oliver Reed, Geraldine Chaplin, Don Gordon	Denmark; United States	Thriller
1973
Title	Director	Cast	Country	Subgenre/notes
Battle for the Planet of the Apes	J. Lee Thompson	Roddy McDowall, Claude Akins, Natalie Trundy	United States	Action
Beyond Atlantis	Eddie Romero	Patrick Wayne, John Ashley, Leigh Christian	Philippines; United States	Action adventure fantasy horror mystery thriller
Blackenstein	William A. Levey	John Hart, Ivory Stone, Andrea King, Roosevelt Jackson	United States	
The Clones	Lamar Card, Paul Hunt	Michael Greene, Gregory Sierra, Otis Young, Susan Hunt	United States	
The Crazies	George A. Romero	Lane Carroll, Will MacMillan, Harold Wayne Jones	United States	Action horror
The Creeping Flesh	Freddie Francis	Christopher Lee, Peter Cushing, Lorna Heilbron, George Benson	United Kingdom	
The Day of the Dolphin	Mike Nichols	George C. Scott, Trish Van Devere, Paul Sorvino	United States	Drama thriller
Digby, the Biggest Dog in the World	Joseph McGrath	Jim Dale, Spike Milligan, Angela Douglas	United Kingdom	Adventure comedy family fantasy
Fantastic Planet	René Laloux	Jennifer Drake (voice), Eric Baugin (voice), Jean Topart (voice)	France; Czechoslovakia	Animation
The Final Programme	Robert Fuest	Jon Finch, Jenny Runacre, Sterling Hayden	United Kingdom	Thriller
Flesh for Frankenstein	Paul Morrissey	Udo Kier, Joe Dellessandro, Monique van Vooren	Italy; France	Horror
Frankenstein: The True Story	Jack Smight	James Mason, Leonard Whiting, David McCallum, Jane Seymour	United Kingdom United States	
Godzilla vs. Megalon (a.k.a. Gojira tai Megaro)	Jun Fukuda	Katsuhiko Sasaki, Hiroyuki Kawase, Yutaka Hayashi	Japan	Action adventure family kaiju
Horror Hospital	Antony Balch	Michael Gough, Robin Askwith, Vanessa Shaw, Ellen Pollock	United Kingdom	
Idaho Transfer	Peter Fonda	Kelly Bohanon, Kevin Hearst, Caroline Hildebrand	United States	
Invasion of the Bee Girls	Denis Sanders	William Smith, Anitra Ford, Victoria Vetri	United States	Horror
Ivan Vasilievich: Back to the Future (a.k.a. Ivan Vasilevich menyaet professiyu)	Leonid Gayday	Yuriy Yakovlev, Leonid Kuravlyov, Aleksandr Demyanenko	Soviet Union	Adventure comedy
Mazinger Z vs. Devilman (a.k.a. Majingâ Zetto tai Debiruman)	Tomoharu Katsumata	Hiroya Ishimaru (voice), Ryôichi Tanaka (voice), Minori Matsushima (voice)	Japan	Adventure short action horror animation
The Miracle	Anatoliy Petrov		Soviet Union	Third segment of the fifth episode of the animated anthology series Happy Merry-Go-Round. Russian title: Чудо, tr. Chudo.
Murder in a Blue World (a.k.a. Una gota de sangre para morir amando)	Eloy de la Iglesia	Sue Lyon, Christopher Mitchum, Jean Sorel	Spain; France	Crime drama thriller
The Neptune Factor	Daniel Petrie	Ben Gazzara, Walter Pidgeon, Ernest Borgnine	Canada	Action adventure drama thriller
Sleeper	Woody Allen	Woody Allen, Diane Keaton, John Beck	United States	Comedy (Note: Won a Hugo Award for Best Dramatic Presentation and a Nebula Award for Best Script.)
Soylent Green	Richard Fleischer	Charlton Heston, Edward G. Robinson, Leigh Taylor-Young	United States	Crime mystery thriller (Note: Winner of a Nebula Award for Best Script and a Saturn Award for Best Science Fiction Film.)
Sssssss	Bernard L. Kowalski	Strother Martin, Dirk Benedict, Heather Menzies, Richard B. Shull	United States	
Submersion of Japan (a.k.a. Nippon chinbotsu)	Shiro Moritani	Keiju Kobayashi, Hiroshi Fujioka, Ayumi Ishida	Japan	Action drama thriller
Tah Tien	Sompote Sands	Supak Likitkul, Sombat Metanee, Sukon Kewlhiem	Thailand	Kaiju
Westworld	Michael Crichton	Yul Brynner, Richard Benjamin, James Brolin	United States	Action thriller western
Who is Beta? (a.k.a. Quem é Beta?)	Nelson Pereira dos Santos	Frédéric de Pasquale, Sylvie Fennec, Regina Rosenburgo	France; Brazil	Drama
Wonder Women	Robert O'Neil	Nancy Kwan, Ross Hagen, Maria De Aragon, Roberta Collins	United States	Action thriller horror
1974
Title	Director	Cast	Country	Subgenre/notes
The 6 Ultra Brothers vs. the Monster Army (a.k.a. Urutora 6-kyodai tai kaijû gundan)	Sompote Sands, Shohei Tôjô	Ko Kaeoduendee, Anan Pricha, Yodchai Meksuwan	Thailand; Japan	Superhero action
Chosen Survivors	Sutton Roley	Jackie Cooper, Alex Cord, Richard Jaeckel	Mexico; United States	Action adventure drama horror thriller
Dark Star	John Carpenter	Dan O'Bannon, Dre Pahich, Brian Narelle	United States	Comedy (Note: Won a Golden Scroll for Best Special Effects in 1976.)
Esupai	Jun Fukuda	Hiroshi Fujioka, Kaoru Yumi, Masao Kusakari	Japan	Action adventure mystery thriller
Flesh Gordon	Michael Benveniste, Howard Ziehm	Jason Williams, Suzanne Fields, Joseph Hudgins	United States	Comedy
Frankenstein and the Monster from Hell	Terence Fisher	Peter Cushing, Shane Briant, Madeline Smith	United Kingdom	Horror
Godzilla vs. Mechagodzilla (a.k.a. Gojira tai Mekagojira )	Jun Fukuda	Masaaki Daimon, Kazuya Aoyama, Reiko Tajima	Japan	Action adventure family fantasy kaiju
Hanuman and the Five Riders (a.k.a. Hanuman pob Har Aimoddaeng)	Sompote Sands	Yodchai Meksuwan, Thanyarat Lohanan, Akiji Kobayashi	Thailand; Japan	Action superhero
Invasion from Inner Earth	Bill Rebane	Paul Bentzen, Debbi Pick, Nick Holt	United States	Drama horror
Jumborg Ace & Giant (a.k.a. Yuk Wud Jaeng Vs. Jumbo A)	Sompote Sands, Shohei Tôjô	Chaiya Suriyun, Aranya Namwong, Sipeuak, Sri Suriya	Thailand; Japan	Action comedy
The Land That Time Forgot	Kevin Connor	Doug McClure, John McEnery, Susan Penhaligon	United Kingdom; United States	Adventure fantasy
Let Sleeping Corpses Lie	Jorge Grau	Cristina Galbó, Ray Lovelock, Arthur Kennedy	Spain; Italy	Horror
Mazinger Z vs. The Great General of Darkness (a.k.a. Majingâ Zetto tai Ankoku Daishôgun)	Nobutaka Nishizawa	Hiroya Ishimaru (voice), Kiyoshi Kobayashi (voice), Ryōichi Tanaka (voice)	Japan	Action short adventure animation
Morel's Invention (a.k.a. L'invenzione di Morel)	Emidio Greco	Giulio Brogi, Anna Karina, John Steiner	Italy	
Moscow-Cassiopeia (a.k.a. Moskva-Kassiopeya)	Richard Viktorov	Innokentiy Smoktunovskiy, Vasiliy Merkur'yev, Lev Durov	Soviet Union	Family comedy
The Mutations	Jack Cardiff	Donald Pleasence, Tom Baker, Brad Harris	United Kingdom; United States	Horror
Phase IV	Saul Bass	Nigel Davenport, Michael Murphy, Lynne Frederick	United Kingdom; United States	Horror sci-fi thriller
Prophecies of Nostradamus (a.k.a. Nosutoradamusu no daiyogen)	Toshio Masuda	Tetsurō Tamba, Toshio Kurosawa, Kaoru Yumi	Japan	Action
Space Is the Place	John Coney	Barbara Deloney, Sun Ra, Raymond Johnson	United States	Music
The Terminal Man	Mike Hodges	George Segal, Joan Hackett, Richard Dysart	United States	Horror thriller
UFO: Target Earth	Michael A. DeGaetano	Nick Plakias, Cynthia Cline, LaVerne Light	United States	
Who?	Jack Gold	Elliott Gould, Trevor Howard, Joseph Bova	United Kingdom United States West Germany	Drama mystery thriller
Zardoz	John Boorman	Sean Connery, Charlotte Rampling, Sara Kestelman	Ireland; United States	Adventure fantasy
1975
Title	Director	Cast	Country	Subgenre/notes
The Big Space Travel	Valentin Selivanov	Lyudmila Berlinskaya, Sergey Obrazov, Igor' Sakharov	Soviet Union	Romance
Black Moon	Louis Malle	Cathryn Harrison, Therese Giehse, Alexandra Stewart	France; West Germany	Fantasy horror mystery
A Boy and His Dog	L.Q. Jones	Don Johnson, Jason Robards, Susanne Benton	United States	Comedy drama thriller (Note: Winner of a Hugo Award for Best Dramatic Presentation.)
Bug	Jeannot Szwarc	Bradford Dillman, Joanna Miles, Richard Gilliland	United States	Horror mystery thriller
Death Race 2000	Paul Bartel	David Carradine, Sylvester Stallone, Simone Griffeth	United States	Action comedy sport
Escape to Witch Mountain	John Hough	Eddie Albert, Ray Milland, Donald Pleasence	United States	Adventure family fantasy mystery
The Flight of Mr. McKinley (a.k.a. Begstvo mistera Mak-Kinli)	Mikhail Shveytser	Donatas Banionis, Zhanna Bolotova, Angelina Stepanova	Soviet Union	Fantasy
Flowers for the Man in the Moon (a.k.a. Blumen für den Mann im Mond)	Rolf Losansky	Jutta Wachowiak, Stefan Lisewski, Sven Grothe	East Germany	Family fantasy
Footprints on the Moon (a.k.a. Le orme)	Luigi Bazzoni	Florinda Bolkan, Peter McEnery, Nicoletta Elmi	Italy	Horror mystery thriller
The Giant Spider Invasion	Bill Rebane	Steve Brodie, Barbara Hale, Robert Easton	United States	Horror
The Great Battle of the Flying Saucers (a.k.a. Uchû Enban Daisensô)	Yugo Serikawa	Isao Sasaki (voice), Noriko Ohara (voice), Minori Matsushima (voice)	Japan	Animation short action
Great Mazinger vs. Getter Robo (a.k.a. Gurêto Majingâ tai Gettâ Robo)	Masayuki Akehi	Akira Kamiya (voice), Junji Yamada (voice), Keiichi Noda (voice)	Japan	Animation short
Hu-Man	Jérôme Laperrousaz	Terence Stamp, Jeanne Moreau, Agnès Stevenin	France	
A Long Return (a.k.a. Largo retorno)	Pedro Lazaga	Mark Burns, Lynne Frederick, Charo López	Spain	Drama romance
Moon Flight	Sándor Reisenbüchler		Hungary	Animated short film. Hungarian title: Holdmese.
The Noah	Daniel Bourla	Robert Strauss, Geoffrey Holder, Sally Kirkland	United States	Drama fantasy
The Rocky Horror Picture Show	Jim Sharman	Tim Curry, Susan Sarandon, Barry Bostwick	United Kingdom; United States	Musical comedy horror
Rollerball	Norman Jewison	James Caan, John Houseman, Maud Adams	United Kingdom; United States	Action sport (Note: Winner of a BAFTA for Best Art Direction.)
Shivers	David Cronenberg	Paul Hampton, Joe Silver, Lynn Lowry	Canada	Horror
The Stepford Wives	Bryan Forbes	Katharine Ross, Paula Prentiss, Peter Masterson	United States	Horror mystery thriller
The Strongest Man in the World	Vincent McEveety	Kurt Russell, Joe Flynn, Eve Arden	United States	Comedy family
The Super Inframan (a.k.a. Zhong guo chao ren)	Hua-Shan	Danny Lee, Terry Liu, Hsieh Wang	Hong Kong	Action
Teens in the Universe (a.k.a. Otroki vo vselennoy)	Richard Viktorov	Mikhail Yershov, Aleksandr Grigor'yev, Vladimir Savin	Soviet Union	Family comedy adventure
Terror of Mechagodzilla (a.k.a. Mekagojira no gyakushu)	Ishirō Honda	Katsuhiko Sasaki, Tomoko Ai, Akihiko Hirata	Japan	Action adventure family
The Ultimate Warrior	Robert Clouse	Yul Brynner, Max von Sydow, Joanna Miles	United States	Action
1976
Title	Director	Cast	Country	Subgenre/notes
Any Day Now (a.k.a. Vandaag of morgen)	Roeland Kerbosch	Ansje van Brandenberg, Huib Broos, Ton van Duinhoven	Netherlands	
At the Earth's Core	Kevin Connor	Doug McClure, Peter Cushing, Caroline Munro	United Kingdom; United States	Adventure fantasy
Breakdown	Krzysztof Kiwerski		Poland	Animated short film. Polish title: Awaria.
Embryo	Ralph Nelson	Rock Hudson, Barbara Carrera, Diane Ladd	United States	Horror
The Food of the Gods	Bert I. Gordon	Marjoe Gortner, Pamela Franklin, Ralph Meeker	United States	Adventure horror
Futureworld	Richard T. Heffron	Peter Fonda, Blythe Danner, Arthur Hill	United States	Thriller
God Told Me To	Larry Cohen	Tony Lo Bianco, Deborah Raffin, Sandy Dennis	United States	Crime horror mystery thriller
Grendizer, Getter Robo G, Great Mazinger: Decisive Battle! The Great Sea Monster	Masayuki Akehi	Kei Tomiyama (voice), Hiroya Ishimaru (voice), Keiichi Noda (voice)	Japan	Animation short action adventure
In the Dust of the Stars (a.k.a. Im Staub der Sterne)	Gottfried Kolditz	Jana Brejchová, Alfred Struwe, Ekkehard Schall	East Germany	
Logan's Run	Michael Anderson	Michael York, Jenny Agutter, Richard Jordan	United States	Action adventure (Note: Winner of an Academy Award for Visual Effects (Special Achievement Award) and a Saturn Award for Best Science Fiction Film.)
The Man Who Fell to Earth	Nicolas Roeg	David Bowie, Rip Torn, Candy Clark	United Kingdom	Drama (Note: Won a Nebula Award for Best Script and a Saturn Award for Best Actor in a film.)
Mirror of Time (a.k.a. Zerkalo vremeni) (a.k.a. Зеркало времени)	Vladimir Tarasov	Mariya Vinogradova (voice), Lev Lyubetskiy (voice)	Soviet Union	Animation short tr.
The Rat Savior (a.k.a. Izbavitelj)	Krsto Papić	Ivica Vidović, Mirjana Majurec, Relja Bašić	Yugoslavia	Horror
Scenes with Beans	Ottó Foky		Hungary	Stop-motion animation short film. Hungarian title: Babfilm.
UFO Robot Grendizer vs. Great Mazinger (UFO robo Gurendaizâ tai Gurêto Majingâ)	Osamu Kasai	Kei Tomiyama (voice), Hiroya Ishimaru (voice), Joji Yanami (voice)	Japan	Animation short action
1977
Title	Director	Cast	Country	Subgenre/notes
Capricorn One	Peter Hyams	Elliott Gould, James Brolin, Sam Waterston	United States	Action adventure drama thriller
Close Encounters of the Third Kind	Steven Spielberg	Richard Dreyfuss, François Truffaut, Teri Garr	United States	Drama (Note: Winner of Academy Awards for Cinematography and Sound Editing (Special Achievement Award) and a Grammy Award for Best Album of Original Score Written for a Motion Picture or a Television Special and Best Instrumental Composition (1979). It was also the second highest grossing film of 1977.)
Cosmos: War of the Planets (a.k.a. Anno zero - Guerra nello spazio)	Alfonso Brescia	John Richardson, Yanti Somer, West Buchanan	Italy	Adventure
Damnation Alley	Jack Smight	Jan-Michael Vincent, George Peppard, Dominique Sanda	United States	
Demon Seed	Donald Cammell	Julie Christie, Fritz Weaver, Gerrit Graham	United States	Horror
Empire of the Ants	Bert I. Gordon	Joan Collins, Robert Lansing, John David Carson	United States	Adventure horror
End of the World	John Hayes	Christopher Lee, Sue Lyon, Kirk Scott	United States	Horror mystery thriller
The Glitterball	Harley Cokeliss (as Harley Cokliss)	Ben Buckton, Keith Jayne, Ron Pember	United Kingdom	Adventure family
How About a Plate of Spinach? (a.k.a. Coz takhle dát si spenát)	Václav Vorlíček	Vladimír Menšík, Jiří Sovák, Iva Janžurová	Czechoslovakia	Comedy
The Incredible Melting Man	William Sachs	Alex Rebar, Burr DeBenning, Myron Healey	United States	Horror
The Island of Dr. Moreau	Don Taylor	Burt Lancaster, Michael York, Nigel Davenport	United States	Adventure fantasy horror romance thriller
Kingdom of the Spiders	John Cardos	William Shatner, Tiffany Bolling, Woody Strode	United States	Horror
Legend of Dinosaurs & Monster Birds (a.k.a. Kyôryû kaichô no densetsu)	Junji Kurata	Tsunehiko Watase, Nobiko Sawa, Shotaro Hayashi	Japan	
The People That Time Forgot	Kevin Connor	Patrick Wayne, Doug McClure, Sarah Douglas, Dana Gillespie	United Kingdom; United States	Adventure
Planet of Dinosaurs	James K. Shea	Mary Appleseth, Harvey Shain, Derna Wylde	United States	Drama
Polygon	Anatoliy Petrov	Anatoliy Kuznetsov (voice), Aleksandr Belyavskiy (voice), Vsevolod Yakut (voice)	Soviet Union	Animation short film
Prey	Norman J. Warren	Barry Stokes, Sally Faulkner, Glory Annen Clibbery	United Kingdom	Horror mystery
Rabid	David Cronenberg	Marilyn Chambers, Frank Moore, Joe Silver	Canada; United States	Horror
Space Battleship Yamato (a.k.a. Uchû senkan Yamato)	Toshio Masuda	Gorô Naya (voice), Kei Tomiyama (voice), Shūsei Nakamura (voice)	Japan	Animation action adventure drama romance
Star Wars	George Lucas	Mark Hamill, Harrison Ford, Carrie Fisher	United States	Action adventure fantasy (Note: Won Academy Awards for Art Direction, Costume Design, Film Editing, Original Score, Sound (Special Achievement Award), Visual Effects; a Saturn Award for Best Science Fiction Film, and a Hugo Award for Best Dramatic Presentation. It was also the highest grossing film of 1977.)
Starship Invasions	Ed Hunt	Robert Vaughn, Christopher Lee, Daniel Pilon	Canada	
Sunday (a.k.a. Pühapäev)	Avo Paistik		Soviet Union	Animation short film
Talíře nad Velkým Malíkovem (a.k.a. The Flying Saucers Over Velky Malikov City)	Jaromil Jireš	Vlastimil Brodský, Jan Tříska, Iva Janžurová	Czechoslovakia	Comedy
Time, Forward! (a.k.a. Vpered, vremya!)	Vladimir Tarasov	Aleksandr Kaydanovskiy (voice)	Soviet Union	Animated short film. Russian title: Вперёд, время!, tr.
Tomorrow I'll Wake Up and Scald Myself with Tea (a.k.a. Zítra vstanu a oparím se cajem)	Jindřich Polák	Petr Kostka, Jiří Sovák, Vladimír Menšík	Czechoslovakia	Comedy romance war
The War in Space (a.k.a. Wakusei daisenso)	Jun Fukuda	Kensaku Morita, Yuko Asano, Ryō Ikebe	Japan	Action adventure
Welcome to Blood City	Peter Sasdy	Jack Palance, Keir Dullea, Samantha Eggar	Canada; United Kingdom	Drama mystery thriller western
Wizards	Ralph Bakshi	Jesse Welles (voice), Bob Holt (voice), Richard Romanus (voice)	United States	Animation adventure fantasy
1978
Title	Director	Cast	Country	Subgenre/notes
The Alien Factor	Donald M. Dohler	Don Leifert, Tom Griffith, Richard Dyszel	United States	Horror
The Alpha Incident	Bill Rebane	Ralph Meeker, Stafford Morgan, John F. Goff	United States	Horror
Battlestar Galactica	Richard A. Colla	Lorne Greene, Dirk Benedict, Richard Hatch	United States	Theatrical release
The Bermuda Triangle	René Cardona Jr.	John Huston, Gloria Guida, Marina Vlady	Mexico; Italy	Horror
Blue Christmas	Kihachi Okamoto	Hiroshi Katsuno, Keiko Takeshita, Eiji Okada	Japan	
The Boys from Brazil	Franklin J. Schaffner	Gregory Peck, Laurence Olivier, James Mason	United Kingdom; United States	Thriller
The Cat from Outer Space	Norman Tokar	Ken Berry, Sandy Duncan, Harry Morgan	United States	Comedy
Contact	Vladimir Tarasov		Soviet Union	Animated short film
Deathsport	Allan Arkush, Nicholas Niciphor, Roger Corman	David Carradine, Claudia Jennings, Richard Lynch	United States	
Farewell to Space Battleship Yamato: In the Name of Love	Toshio Masuda, Leiji Matsumoto	Kei Tomiyama (voice), Yôko Asagami (voice), Gorô Naya (voice)	Japan	
The Fury	Brian De Palma	Kirk Douglas, John Cassavetes, Amy Irving	United States	Supernatural thriller
Hardware Wars	Ernie Fosselius	Frank Robertson, Scott Mathews, Jeff Hale	United States	Short film parody
He Flew In Only Once	Lev Shukalyukov		Soviet Union	Animated short film. Russian title: Он прилетал лишь однажды, tr. On priletal lish' odnazhdy.
Invasion of the Body Snatchers	Philip Kaufman	Donald Sutherland, Brooke Adams, Jeff Goldblum, Veronica Cartwright	United States	Horror (Note: Remake. Winner of Saturn Awards for Best Director and Best Sound.)
Laserblast	Michael Rae	Kim Milford, Cheryl Smith, Gianni Russo	United States	
Libra	Patty Newman	Wayne Grace, Gordon Ross, Jim Hess	United States	Short film
The Medusa Touch	Jack Gold	Richard Burton, Lee Remick, Lino Ventura	United Kingdom; France	Supernatural thriller, horror
Message from Space	Kinji Fukasaku	Vic Morrow, Sonny Chiba, Philip Casnoff	Japan	Space opera
The Mystery of Mamo	Sōji Yoshikawa	Yasuo Yamada (voice), Eiko Masuyama (voice), Kiyoshi Kobayashi (voice)	Japan	First anime film of the Lupin III franchise
Patrick	Richard Franklin	Susan Penhaligon, Robert Helpmann, Rod Mullinar	Australia	Horror
Return from Witch Mountain	John Hough	Bette Davis, Christopher Lee, Kim Richards	United States	Adventure
Science Ninja Team Gatchaman: The Movie	Hisayuki Toriumi	Katsuji Mori (voice), Isao Sasaki (voice), Kazuko Sugiyama (voice)	Japan	Anime superhero film
Starcrash	Luigi Cozzi	Marjoe Gortner, Caroline Munro, Christopher Plummer	United States	Space opera
Stop 88: Alert Limit	José de Anchieta	Regina Duarte, Joel Barcellos, Yara Amaral	Brazil	Eco-dystopian film. Portuguese title: Parada 88: O Limite de Alerta.
Superman	Richard Donner	Marlon Brando, Gene Hackman, Christopher Reeve	United Kingdom; Switzerland; Panama; United States	Superhero (Note: Won the Academy Award for Visual Effects (Special Achievement Award), Saturn Award for Best Science Fiction Film, Hugo Award for Best Dramatic Presentation and the Grammy Award for Best Original Score Written for a Motion Picture or a Television Special and Best Instrumental Composition. It was also the highest grossing film of the year.)
The Swarm	Irwin Allen	Michael Caine, Katharine Ross, Richard Widmark	United States	Disaster, horror
Warlords of Atlantis	Kevin Connor	Doug McClure, Peter Gilmore, Shane Rimmer	United Kingdom	Fantasy
Xenogenesis	James Cameron	William Wisher Jr., Margaret Umbel	United States	Short film
1979
Title	Director	Cast	Country	Subgenre/notes
Alien	Ridley Scott	Sigourney Weaver, Tom Skerritt, John Hurt	United Kingdom; United States	(Note: Winner of the Academy Award for Visual Effects, Saturn Award for Best Science Fiction Film and Hugo Award for Best Dramatic Presentation.)
The Black Hole	Gary Nelson	Maximilian Schell, Anthony Perkins, Robert Forster	United States	
The Brood	David Cronenberg	Oliver Reed, Samantha Eggar, Art Hindle	Canada	
Buck Rogers in the 25th Century	Daniel Haller	Gil Gerard, Erin Gray, Pamela Hensley	United States	
The Dark	John Cardos	William Devane, Cathy Lee Crosby, Richard Jaeckel	United States	
The Day Time Ended	John Cardos	Jim Davis, Dorothy Malone, Christopher Mitchum, Scott Kolden	United States	
Dead Mountaineer's Hotel (Hukkunud Alpinisti / У погибшего альпиниста)	Grigori Kromanov	Uldis Pūcītis, Jüri Järvet, Lembit Peterson, Mikk Mikiver	Estonia / Soviet Union	
Flying Towards the Future	Xiaoya Lu, Ling Miao	Yun Qu, Ling Huang	China	Children's film
The Fortress	Miklós Szinetár	Bella Tanay, Sándor Oszter, József Madaras	Hungary	
G.I. Samurai	Kosei Saito	Sonny Chiba, Jun Etô, Moeko Ezawa	Japan	
Galaxy Express 999	Rintaro	Masako Nozawa (voice), Masako Ikeda (voice), Yôko Asagami (voice)	Japan	
Goldengirl	Joseph Sargent	Susan Anton, James Coburn, Curd Jürgens	United States	
H. G. Wells' The Shape of Things to Come	George McCowan	Jack Palance, Carol Lynley, Barry Morse	Canada	
The Hamburg Syndrome	Peter Fleischmann	Helmut Griem, Fernando Arrabal, Carline Seiser	West Germany; France	
The Humanoid	Aldo Lado	Richard Kiel, Corinne Cléry, Leonard Mann	Italy	
Inquest of Pilot Pirx	Marek Piestrak	Sergey Desnitskiy, Bolesław Abart, Vladimir Ivashov	Poland; Soviet Union	
Island of the Fishmen	Sergio Martino	Barbara Bach, Claudio Cassinelli, Richard Johnson	Italy	
Little Orbit the Astrodog and the Screechers from Outer Space	Jean Image		France	
Mad Max	George Miller	Mel Gibson, Joanne Samuel, Hugh Keays-Byrne	Australia	
The Medic	Pierre Granier-Deferre	Alain Delon, Véronique Jannot, Bernard Giraudeau	France; West Germany	
Meteor	Ronald Neame	Sean Connery, Natalie Wood, Karl Malden	United States; Hong Kong	
Moonraker	Lewis Gilbert	Roger Moore, Lois Chiles, Michel Lonsdale	United Kingdom; France; United States	
On Your Mark!	Lev Shukalyukov		Soviet Union	Animated short film. Russian title: Вам старт!, tr. Vam start!
Outer Touch	Norman J. Warren	Barry Stokes, Tony Maiden, Glory Annen Clibbery	United Kingdom	
Panic	Sándor Reisenbüchler		Hungary	Animated short film. Hungarian title: Pánik.
Phantasm	Don Coscarelli	Michael Baldwin, Bill Thornbury, Reggie Bannister	United States	
Plague	Ed Hunt	Daniel Pilon, Kate Reid, Céline Lomez	Canada; United States	
Quintet	Robert Altman	Paul Newman, Vittorio Gassman, Fernando Rey	United States	
Ravagers	Richard Compton	Richard Harris, Ernest Borgnine, Ann Turkel	United States	
Shooting Range	Vladimir Tarasov		Soviet Union	Animated short film
Stalker	Andrey Tarkovskiy	Alisa Freyndlikh, Aleksandr Kaydanovskiy, Anatoly Solonitsyn	Soviet Union	Art film
Star Trek: The Motion Picture	Robert Wise	William Shatner, Leonard Nimoy, DeForest Kelley	United States	
Supersonic Man	Juan Piquer Simón	Antonio Cantafora, Cameron Mitchell, Diana Polakov	Spain	
The Thing in the Castle	Gottfried Kolditz	Erwin Geschonneck, Vlastimil Brodský, Jaecki Schwarz	East Germany	German title: Das Ding im Schloß
Thirst	Rod Hardy	Chantal Contouri, Shirley Cameron, Max Phipps	Australia	Horror
Time After Time	Nicholas Meyer	Malcolm McDowell, Mary Steenburgen, David Warner	United States	
Under the Constellation Gemini	Boris Ivchenko	Vsevolod Gavrilov, Gennadiy Shkuratov, Boris Belov	Soviet Union	
Unidentified Flying Oddball	Russ Mayberry	Dennis Dugan, Jim Dale, Ron Moody	United Kingdom; United States	
I viaggiatori della sera	Ugo Tognazzi	Ugo Tognazzi, Ornella Vanoni, Roberta Paladini	Italy; Spain	
The Visitor	Giulio Paradisi	Mel Ferrer, Glenn Ford, Lance Henriksen	Italy; United States	
The Year of the Plague	Felipe Cazals	Alejandro Parodi, José Carlos Ruiz, Rebeca Silva	Mexico	

== See also ==
- History of science fiction films
