= List of science fiction horror films =

This is a list of science fiction horror films.

== See also ==
- Category:Science fiction horror films
- Category:Science fiction horror (subcategories Films, Novels, Video games)

== 0-9 ==
- 4D Man (1959)
- 9 (2009)
- 9 (2019)

== A ==
- Absurd (1981)
- The Abyss (1989)
- Alien and Alien vs. Predator:
  - Alien (1979)
  - Aliens (1986)
  - Alien 3 (1992)
  - Alien Resurrection (1997)
  - Prometheus (2012)
  - Alien: Covenant (2017)
  - Alien: Romulus (2024)
  - Alien vs. Predator (2004)
  - Aliens vs. Predator: Requiem (2007)
- Alien 2: On Earth (1980)
- Alien Abduction (2005)
- Alien Abduction (2014)
- The Alien Factor (1976)
- The Alien Within (1995)
- All Superheroes Must Die (2011)
- Alligator (1980)
- The Alligator People (1959)
- Alone in the Dark:
  - Alone in the Dark (2005)
  - Alone in the Dark II (2008)
- Alpha Girls (2013)
- The Alpha Incident (1977)
- Alraune:
  - Alraune (1918)
  - Alraune, the Hangman's Daughter, Named Red Hanna (1918)
  - Alraune (1928)
  - Alraune (1930)
  - Alraune (1952)
- Altered (2006)
- Altered Species (2001)
- Altered States (1980)
- Angels Fallen (2020)
- Annihilation (2018)
- The Ape Man (1943)
- Apollo 18 (2011)
- Arachnicide (2014)
- Arcade (1993)
- Area 51 (2013)
- The Astounding She-Monster (1958)
- The Astro-Zombies (1968)
- The Astronaut's Wife (1999)
- Ataque de pánico! (2009)
- Attack the Block (2011)
- Attack of the Giant Leeches (1959)
- Attack of the Mushroom People (1963)
- Attack of the Puppet People (1958)
- Avalanche Sharks (2013)
- Aversion (2009)
- AVH: Alien vs. Hunter (2007)

== B ==
- Bad Taste (1987)
- The Beast from 20,000 Fathoms (1953)
- Behemoth, the Sea Monster (1959)
- The Being (1983)
- Beyond the Black Rainbow (2010)
- Beware! The Blob (1972)
- Black (2024)
- Blackbirds at Bangpleng (1994)
- The Blackout (2009)
- Bleeders (1997)
- The Blob (1958)
- The Blob (1988)
- The Blood Beast Terror (1967)
- Bloodsuckers (2005)
- Bloodsuckers from Outer Space (1984)
- Body Melt (1993)
- The Body Snatchers:
  - Invasion of the Body Snatchers (1956)
  - Invasion of the Body Snatchers (1978)
  - Body Snatchers (1993)
  - The Invasion (2007)
- The Box (2009)
- A Boy and His Dog (1975)
- The Brain (1988)
- Brainscan (1994)
- Bride of the Monster (1955)
- The Brides of Sodom (2013)
- The Brood (1979)
- "Bug" (1975)
- The Butterfly Effect:
  - The Butterfly Effect (2004)
  - The Butterfly Effect 2 (2006)
  - The Butterfly Effect 3: Revelations (2009)

== C ==
- Carrie (2002)
- Carrie (2013)
- The Cabin in the Woods (2012)
- Camp Slaughter (2005)
- Carnosaur:
  - Carnosaur (1993)
  - Carnosaur 2 (1995)
  - Carnosaur 3: Primal Species (1996)
  - Carnosaur 4: Raptor (2001)
  - Carnosaur 5: Tyrannosaurus Wrecks (2006)
- Carny (2009)
- The Cat (1992)
- The Cell (2000)
- Chemical Wedding (2008)
- Children of the Damned (1963)
- Choose or Die (2022)
- Chopping Mall (1986)
- Cinco (2010)
- Circle (2015)
- Clayface (2026)
- Cloverfield:
  - Cloverfield (2008)
  - 10 Cloverfield Lane (2016)
  - The Cloverfield Paradox (2018)
- Color Out of Space (2019)
- Contamination (1980)
- The Crazies:
  - The Crazies (1973)
  - The Crazies (2010)
- Creature (1985)
- Creature from the Black Lagoon (1954)
- Creature of the Walking Dead (1965)
- The Creature Walks Among Us (1956)
- Creature with the Atom Brain (1955)
- The Creeping Terror (1964)
- Creepozoids (1987)
- Creepshow (1982)
- Critters
  - Critters (1986)
  - Critters 2: The Main Course (1988)
  - Critters 3 (1991)
  - Critters 4 (1992)
- Cube:
  - Cube (1997)
  - Cube 2: Hypercube (2003)
  - Cube Zero (2004)
  - Cube (2021)
- Cuckoo (2024)
- The Curse (1987)
- Curse of Snakes Valley (1988)
- Curse of the Swamp Creature (1968)
- Cyclops (1987)

== D ==
- Dance of the Dead (2008)
- The Dark (1979)
- Dark City (1998)
- The Dark Side of the Moon (1990)
- Dark Skies (2013)
- Day the World Ended (1955)
- The Day Mars Invaded Earth (1963)
- The Day of the Triffids (1962)
- Day Watch (2006)
- Daybreakers (2010)
- Dead Heat (1988)
- Dead Space: Downfall (2008)
- Deadly Friend (1986)
- The Deadly Spawn (1983)
- Dear God No! (2011)
- Death Machine (1995)
- Debug (2014)
- Decay (2012)
- Deep Blue Sea:
  - Deep Blue Sea (1999)
  - Deep Blue Sea 2 (2018)
  - Deep Blue Sea 3 (2020)
- Deep Rising (1998)
- DeepStar Six (1989)
- Delicatessen (1991)
- Demon Seed (1977)
- The Devil Bat (1940)
- Devil's Pass (2013)
- Die, Monster, Die! (1965)
- Doctor Blood's Coffin (1961)
- Doctor X (1932)
- Donovan's Brain (1953)
- Doom (2005)
- Down (film) (2001)
- Dr. Cyclops (1940)
- Dr. Jekyll and Sister Hyde (1971)
- Dr. Moreau's House of Pain (2004)
- Dracula 3000 (2004)
- Dracula vs. Frankenstein (1971)
- Dreamscape (2007)

== E ==
- Eden Log (2007)
- Eel Girl (2008)
- Embryo (1976)
- Empire of the Ants (1977)
- Endangered Species (2003)
- The Endless (2017)
- Europa Report (2013)
- Event Horizon (1997)
- Evolver (1995)
- Ex Machina (2014)
- Existenz (1999)
- The Eye Creatures (1965)
- Eyes Without a Face (1960)

== F ==
- The Faculty (1998)
- Fiend Without a Face (1958)
- Firestarter (1984)
- First Man into Space (1959)
- The Flesh Eaters (1964)
- Flu Bird Horror (2008)
- The Fly:
  - The Fly (1958)
  - Return of the Fly (1959)
  - Curse of the Fly (1965)
  - The Fly (1986)
  - The Fly II (1989)
- The Food of the Gods (1976)
- Food of the Gods II (1989)
- Frankenhooker (1990)
- Frankenstein:
  - Frankenstein (1931)
  - Frankenstein Conquers the World (1965)
  - Frankenstein Must Be Destroyed (1969)
  - Flesh for Frankenstein (1973)
  - Frankenstein Unbound (1990)
  - Frankenstein (1992)
  - Frankenstein (1994)
  - Frankenstein (2004)
  - Frankenstein (2007)
  - Frankenstein (2015)
  - Frankenstein's Army (2013)
  - Frankenstein: The True Story (1973)
- Friend of the World (2020)
- From Beyond (1986)
- From Hell It Came (1957)
- The Fury (1978)

== G ==
- Galaxy of Terror (1981)
- Gamera, the Giant Monster (1965)
- Get Out (2017)
- Ghost Machine (2007)
- Ghosts of Mars (2001)
- The Giant Claw (1957)
- Giant from the Unknown (1958)
- The Giant Spider Invasion (1975)
- God Told Me To (1976)
- Goke, Body Snatcher from Hell (1968)
- Grabbers (2012)
- The Green Slime (1968)

== H ==
- Halloween III: Season of the Witch (1982)
- Harbinger Down (2015)
- Hardware (1990)
- Hell's Highway (2002)
- The Hidden:
  - The Hidden (1987)
  - The Hidden II (1993)
- The Hideous Sun Demon (1958)
- High Life (2018)
- Hobgoblins (1988)
- Hollow Man:
  - Hollow Man (2000)
  - Hollow Man 2 (2006)
- Horrors of Spider Island (1960)
- The Host (2006)
- House of the Living Dead (1973)
- The Human Race (2013)
- The Hybrid (2014)

== I ==
- I Am Legend:
  - The Last Man on Earth (1964)
  - The Omega Man (1971)
  - I Am Legend (2007)
  - I Am Ωmega (2007)
- The Incredible 2-Headed Transplant (1971)
- The Incredible Shrinking Man (1957)
- Infini (2015)
- Inquest of Pilot Pirx (1979)
- Inseminoid (1981)
- Invaders from Mars:
  - Invaders from Mars (1953)
  - Invaders from Mars (1986)
- Invasion from Inner Earth (1974)
- The Invisible Man:
  - The Invisible Man (1933)
  - The Invisible Man Returns (1940)
  - The Invisible Woman (1940)
  - Invisible Agent (1942)
  - The Invisible Man's Revenge (1944)
  - The Invisible Man (2020)
- Iron Lung (2026)
- The Island of Dr. Moreau (1977)
- The Island of Dr. Moreau (1996)
- Island of Lost Souls (1932)
- Island of Terror (1966)
- It Came from Beneath the Sea (1955)
- It Came from Outer Space (1953)
- It! The Terror from Beyond Space (1958)

== J ==
- Jack Frost (1997)
- Jason X (2001)
- Joey (1985)

== K ==
- Kill Command (2016)
- Killer Klowns from Outer Space (1988)
- The Kindred (1987)
- Kiss Me Quick! (1964)
- Komodo (1999)
- The Kovak Box (2006)

== L ==
- The Lady and the Monster (1944)
- Lady Frankenstein (1971)
- Ladrón de Cadáveres (1956)
- The Last Days on Mars (2013)
- The Last Man on Earth (1964, L'ultimo uomo della Terra)
- The Last Seven (2010)
- Last Woman on Earth (1964)
- Lavalantula (2015)
- The Lawnmower Man:
  - The Lawnmower Man (1992)
  - Lawnmower Man 2: Beyond Cyberspace (1996)
- Leprechaun 4: In Space (1997)
- Let Sleeping Corpses Lie (1974)
- Leviathan (1989)
- Life (2017)
- Life Blood (2009)
- Lifeforce (1985)
- The Lift (1983)

== M ==
- M3GAN (2022)
- The Mad Monster (1942)
- The Mad Ghoul (1943)
- Man's Best Friend (1993)
- Man Made Monster (1941)
- The Man They Could Not Hang (1939)
- The Man Who Changed His Mind (1936)
- The Manster (1959)
- Maximum Overdrive (1986)
- Meatball Machine (2005)
- Mesa of Lost Women (1953)
- Mimic:
  - Mimic (1997)
  - Mimic 2 (2001)
  - Mimic 3: Sentinel (2003)
- Mindwarp (Brain Slasher, 1992)
- The Mist (2007)
- The Monolith Monsters (1957)
- Monster (1980)
- Monster a Go-Go (1965)
- Monster from Green Hell (1957)
- Monster from the Ocean Floor (1954)
- The Monster That Challenged the World (1957)
- Monsters:
  - Monsters (2010)
  - Monsters: Dark Continent (2014)
- Monstrosity (1963)
- Moon (2009)
- Moon Child (2003)
- Mutant Chronicles (2008)
- Mutant Girls Squad (2010)
- Mutants (2009)
- The Mysterians (1957)

== N ==
- Narcopolis (2015)
- The Neanderthal Man (1953)
- Nekrotronic (2018)
- Night of the Big Heat (1967)
- Night of the Blood Beast (1957)
- Night of the Creeps (1986)
- Night of the Lepus (1972)
- Nightbeast (1982)
- Nightflyers (1987)
- Nope (2022)
- Not of This Earth:
  - Not of This Earth (1957)
  - Not of This Earth (1988)

== O ==
- The Omega Man (1971)
- Outland (1981)
- Outpost:
  - Outpost (2008)
  - Outpost II: Black Sun (2011)
  - Outpost III: Rise of the Spetsnaz (2013)
- Overlord (2018)

== P ==
- Pandorum (2009)
- Parasite (1982)
- Parasite Eve (1997)
- Parasyte:
  - Parasyte: Part 1 (2014)
  - Parasyte: Part 2 (2015)
- Phantasm:
  - Phantasm (1979)
  - Phantasm II (1988)
  - Phantasm III: Lord of the Dead (1994)
  - Phantasm IV: Oblivion (1998)
  - Phantasm: Ravager (2016)
- The Pit (1981)
- Pitch Black (2000)
  - The Chronicles of Riddick (franchise)
- Plague (1979)
- Plan 9 from Outer Space (1959)
- Planet of the Vampires (1965)
- Pontypool (2008)
- Predator:
  - Predator (1987)
  - Predator 2 (1990)
  - Predators (2010)
  - The Predator (2018)
  - Prey (2022)
  - Predator: Badlands (2025)
- Prey (1977)
- Prince of Darkness (1987)
- Pterodactyl (2005)
- Pulse (1988)
- Pulse:
  - Pulse (2006)
  - Pulse 2: Afterlife (2008)
  - Pulse 3: Invasion (2008)

== Q ==
- Quarantine:
  - Quarantine (2008)
  - Quarantine 2: Terminal (2011)
- Quatermass:
  - The Quatermass Xperiment (1955)
  - Quatermass 2 (1957)
  - Quatermass and the Pit (1967)
- Queen of Blood (1966)
- A Quiet Place:
  - A Quiet Place (2018)
  - A Quiet Place Part II (2021)
  - A Quiet Place: Day One (2024)

== R ==
- Rabid (1977)
- Raging Sharks (2005)
- Reanimator:
  - Re-Animator (1985)
  - Bride of Re-Animator (1990)
  - Beyond Re-Animator (2003)
- The Relic (1997)
- Repo! The Genetic Opera (2008)
- Resident Evil:
  - Resident Evil (2002)
  - Resident Evil: Apocalypse (2004)
  - Resident Evil: Extinction (2007)
  - Resident Evil: Afterlife (2010)
  - Resident Evil: Retribution (2012)
  - Resident Evil: The Final Chapter (2017)
- Return of the Living Dead
  - The Return of the Living Dead (1985)
  - Return of the Living Dead: Necropolis (2005)
- The Return of Swamp Thing (1989)
- The Robot vs. The Aztec Mummy (1958)
- Rottweiler (2004)

== S ==
- S.S. Doomtrooper (2006)
- Les Saignantes (2005)
- Saturn 3 (1980)
- Save the Green Planet! (2003)
- Scanners:
  - Scanners (1981)
  - Scanners II: The New Order (1991)
  - Scanners III: The Takeover (1992)
  - Scanner Cop (1994)
  - Scanners: The Showdown (1995)
- Scar (2007)
- Scared to Death (1981)
- Screamers:
  - Screamers (1995)
  - Screamers: The Hunting (2009)
- Sea Fever (2019)
- Sector 236 – Thor's Wrath (2010)
- Shake, Rattle and Roll Fourteen: The Invasion (2012)
- Shivers (1975)
- Shyness Machine Girl (2009)
- The Signal (2007)
- Signs (2002)
- Silent Night, Deadly Night 5: The Toy Maker (1991)
- Snakehead Terror (2004)
- Southbound (2015)
- Species:
  - Species (1995)
  - Species II (1998)
  - Species III (2004)
  - Species: The Awakening (2007)
- Sphere (1998)
- The Son of Dr. Jekyll (1951)
- Splice (2009)
- Splinter (2008)
- Spontaneous Combustion (1990)
- Star Crystal (1986)
- Starfish (2018)
- Starship Troopers:
  - Starship Troopers (1997)
  - Starship Troopers 2: Hero of the Federation (2004)
  - Starship Troopers 3: Marauder (2008)
  - Starship Troopers: Invasion (2012)
  - Starship Troopers: Traitor of Mars (2017)
- The Stepford Wives (1975)
- Storage 24 (2012)
- Stranded (2013)
- The Stuff
- The Suckling (1990)
- Sunshine (2007)
- Supernova (2000)
- The Survivalist (2015)
- The Swarm (1978)
- Syngenor (1990)

== T ==
- Tales of Halloween (2015)
- Tell-Tale (2009)
- Tell Me How I Die (2016)
- The Terror Within:
  - The Terror Within (1989)
  - The Terror Within II (1991)
- TerrorVision (1986)
- Tetsuo:
  - Tetsuo: The Iron Man (1989)
  - Tetsuo II: Body Hammer (1992)
  - Tetsuo: The Bullet Man (2009)
- The Thaw (2009)
- Them! (1954)
- They Live (1988)
- They Wait (2007)
- The Thing:
  - The Thing from Another World (1951)
  - The Thing (1982)
  - The Thing (2011)
- Thirst (1979)
- The Tingler (1959)
- Tokyo Gore Police (2007)
- Top of the Food Chain (1999)
- The Toxic Avenger (1984)
- The Trollenberg Terror (1958)
- The Twilight People (1972)

== U ==
- The Unborn (1991)
- Undead (2003)
- Under the Skin (2013)
- Underwater (2020)
- Underworld (1985)
- Underworld:
  - Underworld (2003)
  - Underworld: Evolution (2006)
  - Underworld: Rise of the Lycans (2009)
  - Underworld: Awakening (2012)
  - Underworld: Blood Wars (2017)
- Unmatta (2019)
- Upgrade (2018)
- Us (2019)

== V ==
- The Vampire (1957)
- The Vampire Bat (1933)
- Vampirella (1996)
- V/H/S (2012)
- V/H/S/Beyond (2024)
- Victor Frankenstein (2015)
- Videodrome (1983)
- Village of the Damned:
  - Village of the Damned (1960)
  - Village of the Damned (1995)
- The Vindicator (1986)
- The Visitor (1979)

== W ==
- The War of the Gargantuas (1966)
- The War of the Worlds (1953)
- War of the Worlds (2005)
- Watchers:
  - Watchers (1988)
  - Watchers II (1990)
  - Watchers 3 (1994)
  - Watchers Reborn (1998)
- Webs (2003)
- Werewolves of the Third Reich (2017)
- Westworld:
  - Westworld (1973)
  - Futureworld (1976)
- Wicked City (1987)
- Without Warning (1980)
- Wolf's Hole (1987)
- World War Z (2013)
- Wrestlemaniac (2006)
- Wyrmwood (2014)
- Wyvern (2009)

== X ==
- X: The Man with the X-ray Eyes (1963)
- X the Unknown (1956)
- The X-Files:
  - The X-Files: Fight the Future (1998)
  - The X-Files: I Want to Believe (2008)
- Xtro:
  - Xtro (1983)
  - Xtro II: The Second Encounter (1991)
  - Xtro 3: Watch the Skies (1995)

== Z ==
- Zaat (1971)
- Zombie Strippers (2008)
- Zombie Wars (2007)
- Zone of the Dead (2009)
- Zontar, the Thing from Venus (1967)

== See also ==
- Lists of horror films
- Lists of science fiction films
- List of comic science fiction films
- List of science fiction action films
