= Gleason, Wisconsin =

Settlement in Wisconsin, United States

- Unincorporated community
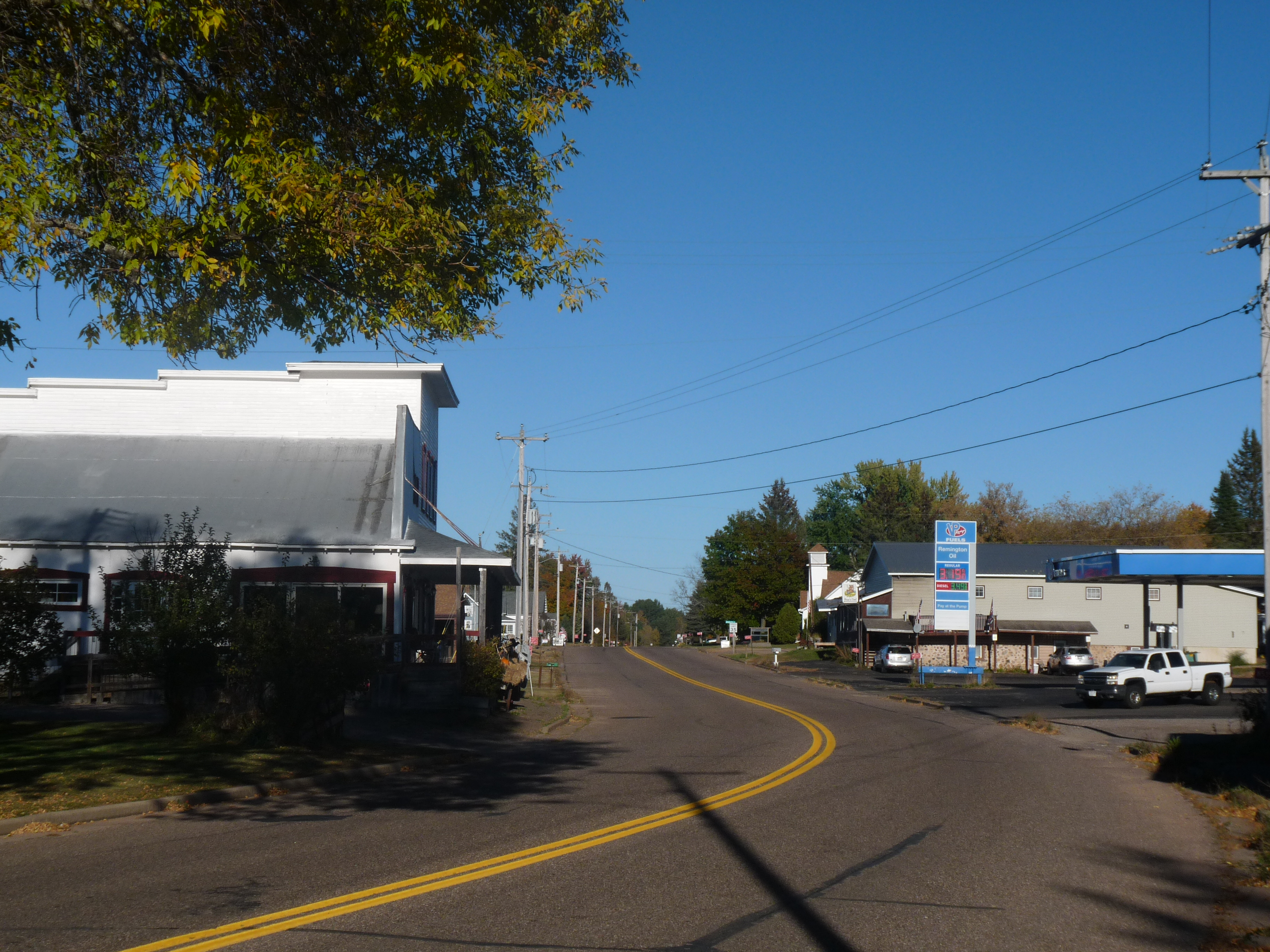
- Downtown Gleason

- Location within Wisconsin Location within the United States
- Coordinates: 45°18′32″N 89°29′47″W
- Country: United States
- State: Wisconsin
- County: Lincoln
- Town: Russell
- Elevation: 1,467 ft (447 m)
- Time zone: UTC-6 (Central (CST))
  - Summer (DST): UTC-5 (CDT)
- ZIP code: 54435
- Area codes: 715 & 534
- GNIS feature ID: 1565555

Gleason is an unincorporated community in Lincoln County, Wisconsin, United States. The community is situated on Wisconsin Highway 17, about 12 miles northeast of Merrill, in the town of Russell. Gleason has a post office with ZIP Code 54435.

In the late 1800s, the area was sparsely settled, inhabited by hunters, trappers, traders, and native Americans. In 1880, Salem and Sarah Gleason and their four children, Minnie, Emma, James, and Frank, and staked a 160-acre homestead claim. That land would later become the community of Gleason, named after these two homesteaders who were instrumental in the community’s development.

The Estonian Evangelical Martin Luther Church, founded July 16, 1914, is the first Estonian church built in America, and is located in Gleason on Estonian Church Road off of County Road J.

Located just outside downtown Gleason, the Kromer Kap Kulture Klub is a private club and hunting camp named after the Stormy Kromer cap, a distinctive wool cap that originated in Wisconsin. The cap serves as the klub's symbol and trademark, and members customarily wear Stormy Kromer caps as part of the club's identity.

Gleason is known as the "Trout Fishing Capital of the World," boasting trout fishing on many local streams. Restoration efforts on the Prairie River have helped support brook trout, brown trout, and other native species, reinforcing the community's fishing heritage.

== Media ==
Several films have been shot in Gleason, including The Giant Spider Invasion (1975), The Capture of Bigfoot (1979), The Devonsville Terror (1983), The Demons of Ludlow (1983), Blood Harvest (1987), and Twister's Revenge! (1987). Many of these were directed by Bill Rebane. Gleason was the home of Shooting Ranch Motion Picture Studios for about 30 years, until it closed in 1988.
