= David Alan Smith =

David Alan Smith may refer to:

- David A. Smith (computer scientist) (born 1957), American computer scientist and entrepreneur
- David Alan Smith (actor) (born 1959), American actor and writer
