= Szmanda (surname) =

Szmanda is a surname. Notable people with the surname include:

- Eric Szmanda (born 1975), American actor of Polish, German, and English descent
- Ray Szmanda (1926–2018), American radio and television announcer
