= The Capture of Bigfoot =

- VHS cover of The Capture of Bigfoot
- Directed by: Bill Rebane
- Written by: Ingrid Neumayer; Bill Rebane
- Produced by: William D. Cannon; Peter Fink; Elwyn O. Jarvis; Bill Rebane; M. Dan Stroick
- Starring: Janus Raudkivi; Randolph Rebane; Otis Young; George 'Buck' Flower; William Dexter; Jeana Keough
- Cinematography: Bill Rebane; Bela St. Jon
- Edited by: Douglas Ibold; Bill Rebane
- Production company: Studio Film Corp.
- Distributed by: Troma Entertainment
- Release date: November 23, 1979
- Running time: 92 minutes
- Country: United States
- Language: English

The Capture of Bigfoot (a.k.a. The Legend of Bigfoot) is a 1979 horror film from Bill Rebane, the director of Monster A-Go-Go. Produced and originally released by Studio Film Corp, the film was re-released in 2010 by Troma Entertainment.

== Plot ==
The creature known as Bigfoot has managed to elude capture for more than 25 years and a small town has made a cottage industry out of local Bigfoot sightings and merchandising. When a businessman decides to trap Bigfoot once and for all so that he can benefit, the town may ultimately lose the tourist profits that have filled the town's coffers.

== Cast ==
- Janus Raudkivi as The Legendary Creature of Arak
- Randolph Rebane as Little Bigfoot
- Otis Young as Jason
- George 'Buck' Flower as Jake
- William Dexter as Hank
- Jeana Keough as Dancer
- Stafford Morgan as Garrett
- Katherine Hopkins as Karen
- Richard Kennedy as Olsen
- John F. Goff as Burt
- John Eimerman as Jimmy
- Randolph Scott as Randy
- Wally Flaherty as Sheriff Cooper
- Durwood McDonald as John
- Harry Youstos as Harry
- Verkina Flower as Linda
- Greg Gault as Kevin
- Nelson C. Sheppo as Daniels
- Mitzi Kress as Elsie
- Woody Jarvis as Woody
- William D. Cannon as Carlsen

== Production ==
Filming for The Capture of Bigfoot took place in Lincoln and Gleason, Wisconsin during early 1979. Much of the filming took place at Rebane's Studio Film corporation, where he also lived, as well as at a local sheriff's office, hospital, and bar. Part of the film took place in Bigfoot's cave, which the film's set designer created using burlap sacks and acrylic plaster. As the filming took place during the winter, the crew experienced some weather related setbacks such as a high speed camera freezing. Continuity was also an issue, as the crew could not continue filming a scene if the weather changed between takes.

For the film, Rebane repurposed two of his own vehicles and affixed logos for the Lincoln police department and Department of Natural Resources. This caused some confusion with local residents, who believed that the respective departments had purchased them for filming. Costuming for the film was credited to Kmart.

== Release ==
The Capture of Bigfoot premiered at the Cosmo Theatre in Merril, Wisconsin on July 27, 1979, followed by a wider theatrical release on November 23, 1979. The film was later screened on May 7, 2005 as part of the Bill Rebane Film Festival, which was held at the Orpheum Theatre in Madison, Wisconsin.

== Reception ==
In his book All I Need to Know About Filmmaking I Learned from The Toxic Avenger, Troma president Lloyd Kaufman lists this film as one of the five worst Troma films ever distributed (along with Croaked: Frog Monster from Hell, also directed by Bill Rebane).
