= The Outcasts (American TV series) =

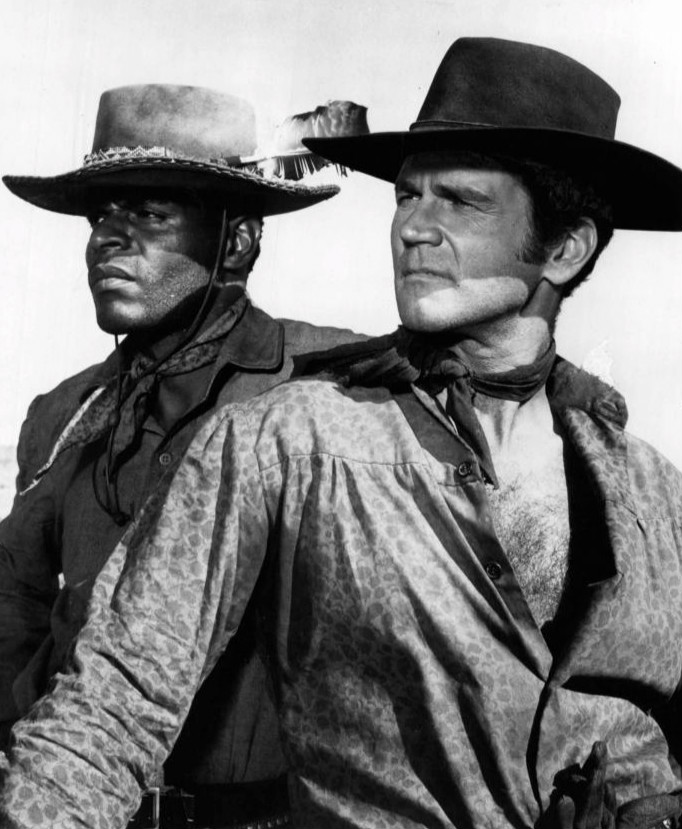
- From left: Otis Young as Jemal David, and Don Murray as Earl Corey.
- Genre: Western
- Created by: Ben Brady; Leon Tokatyan
- Written by: Albert Aley; Harold Jack Bloom; Richard M. Bluel; Ben Brady; Gerry Day; Anthony Lawrence; Don Tait; Leon Tokatyan
- Directed by: Robert Butler; Marc Daniels; Robert Sparr; Paul Landres; Joseph Lejtes; Allen Reisner; E.W. Swackhamer
- Starring: Don Murray; Otis Young
- Music by: Hugo Montenegro
- Country of origin: United States
- Original language: English
- No. of seasons: 1
- No. of episodes: 26

Production
- Executive producer: Hugh Benson
- Producer: Jon Epstein
- Camera setup: Single-camera
- Running time: 48 mins.
- Production company: Screen Gems

Original release
- Network: ABC
- Release: September 23, 1968 – May 5, 1969

The Outcasts is an American Western television series, appearing on ABC in the 1968–69 season. The series stars Don Murray and Otis Young. It is most notable for being the first television Western with an African American co-star.

== Synopsis ==
"Jemal David and Earl Corey. One black, one white; one ex-Union soldier, one ex-Confederate officer; one ex-slave, one ex-slave owner. Together, they are the Outcasts."

Those words opened a series telling the story of bounty hunter Jemal David (Young) and ex-Confederate cavalry officer Earl Corey (Murray) who teams up with David in the early 1870s.

Several dynamics ran through the show. For one, the two heroes were not friends - Corey would frequently to call David "Boy" and David would call him "Boss". They were reluctant partners, both very fast and deadly with a gun, who were thrown together by circumstance when Corey walked into town carrying his saddle and needing a job, and David badly needing another gun to watch his back. Each had something the other wanted. And David was a realist, knowing there were places Corey could enter that he, a black man, could not. There were times when Corey had to ponder whether to side with other whites or back up his new partner. And David had to learn to trust a man who, a few years before, had held the whip hand - literally - and who once considered slaves to be "inventory". But, as they moved through their new situation, a grudging respect came into being. It was not real friendship. "We ride together" Corey said, when asked. But there were hints along the way.

A rich - poor dichotomy was very subtle. Earl Corey had lived on a Virginia plantation, a rich man, who returned after the war to find his plantation untouched, everything just as he left it - but now in the hands of his pro-Union brother whom Corey, and other Southerners, considered a traitor. With the Union army and the carpetbaggers now in charge, Corey found himself with nothing. Jemal David, on the other hand, had been a slave who had never owned anything. Even his name was manufactured from a bottle of hair tonic. But he was now fairly prosperous, at least by his own standards. Earl tended to be tense in this "new" environment, but Jemal took things in stride, having come up, as he said: "a tough road... a long, hard road..." Both men lived only for the day.

== Episodes ==
No.	Title	Original release date
1	"The Outcasts - the pilot episode"	September 23, 1968
In the post-American Civil War era, discharged Confederate States Army soldier Earl Corey (Don Murray) forms an alliance with freed slave Jemal David (Otis Young) as bounty hunters.
2	"A Ride to Vengeance"	September 30, 1968
Jamal and Corey are jailed when an old wanted poster with Jamal's image turns up. Ken Lynch as Sheriff Lansford, Diana Muldaur as Peg Skinner
3	"Three Ways to Die"	October 7, 1968
Corey breaks Jamal out of jail after he is framed for murder. James Gregory as Sheriff John Giles, Dub Taylor as Anson
4	"The Understanding"	October 14, 1968
Jamal and Corey are arrested while in Mexico. Manuel Padilla Jr. as a Mexican boy, Nico Minardos as the Lieutenant
5	"Take Your Lover in the Ring"	October 28, 1968
Corey and Jamal fall prey to a theft scam. Corey believes he won a black woman in a poker game, but she runs off with his money, back to the married couple who put her up to it. Jamal pursues her, and falls in love. Gloria Foster as Sabine, Virginia Gregg as Odette
6	"The Heroes"	November 11, 1968
Corey and Jamal are hired to be ranch security guards. Royal Dano as Walt Madsen, Bo Svenson as Pardee
7	"My Name Is Jemal"	November 18, 1968
Jemal is shanghaied and his identity stolen. Mel Carter appears uncredited as a singing prisoner
8	"The Night Riders"	November 25, 1968
Although the American Civil War is over, some southerners refuse to admit defeat. Such a group tries to recruit Corey to lead them restoring the south to what it was before the war. Larry Gates as General Carver
9	"The Heady Wine"	December 2, 1968
Jamal becomes town sheriff. Lou Frizzell as Traynor
10	"The Man from Bennington"	December 16, 1968
Hayden Rorke as Dr. Ellis
11	"The Bounty Children"	December 23, 1968
Earl and Jamal rescue orphaned children, after being unable to keep their mother alive in a wagon. Unknown to them, the children's father is an escaped prisoner being pursued by bounty hunters. Charles Aidman as Dan Forrest
12	"They Shall Rise Up"	January 6, 1969
Jamal is kidnapped by corrupt officials and forced to work in a mine. Mort Mills as Tauber, Sean McClory as Welch
13	"Alligator King"	January 20, 1969
Jamal experiences introspection of himself and his culture, while he assists his friend Julbuta Mekko (Paul Mantee) get his land back from swindlers.
14	"The Candidates"	January 27, 1969
Earl re-connects with his former love Julie (Susan Howard), who is now the wife of mayoral candidate John Mason (Grant Williams).
15	"The Glory Wagon"	February 3, 1969
While on another consignment, the duo transport nitroglycerin to clear a mine cave-in, helping to rescue buried workers. Jack Elam as Abel Blackner, Bing Russell as Grainger
16	"Act of Faith"	February 10, 1969
While defending Ben Pritchard (Brock Peters), a black man accused of murder, they meet opposition from the deceased man's employer.
17	"The Thin Edge"	February 17, 1969
Corey must deal with repercussions of a past deed that accidentally killed a young woman. Her still-living mother (Ida Lupino) poses a challenge. Harry Carey Jr. as the sheriff
18	"Gideon"	February 24, 1969
Emancipated slave Gideon (Roscoe Lee Browne) challenges preconceived ideas. Robert J. Wilke as Sheriff Gus Harris
19	"And Then There Was One"	March 3, 1969
The fellows are charged with delivering seven prisoners, but plans go awry. Arthur Hunnicutt as Beckwith, Alejandro Rey as Miguel Otero
20	"Hung for a Lamb"	March 10, 1969
Earl is falsely accused of a bank robbery, while saloon girl Polly (Tammy Grimes) complicates the situation. Mike Road as Stan Sutton, Kevin Hagen as the sheriff
21	"A Time of Darkness"	March 24, 1969
The duo hold up in a cave during a thunder storm, upsetting Native Americans who already claimed it as a tribal burial ground. A Martinez as a Native American
22	"The Town That Wouldn't"	March 31, 1969
After being stranded by horse thieves, the duo are faced with fighting off hooligans bent on destroying what's left of the town. Ruth Roman as Jade Willoughby
23	"The Stalking Devil"	April 7, 1969
A $200 reward awaits anyone who can deliver a "black devil" who is menacing the native Americans. Rodolfo Acosta as Chief Frente
24	"Give Me Tomorrow"	April 21, 1969
Corey and David serve as travel escorts for the wealthy Hawley family. John Hoyt as Justin Hawley
25	"The Long Ride"	April 28, 1969
Corey and Jamal escort a white prisoner whom everybody wants a piece of - the native Americans want a shot at extracting revenge, while the whites think the prisoner knows where a gold mine is. Ted de Corsia appears as the sheriff, J. Pat O'Malley as Northingest Jim
26	"How Tall Is Blood?"	May 5, 1969
After rescuing two Native Americans from mob violence, Corey and Jamal serve as security guards for the tribe's silver mine shipments. French actress Lilyan Chauvin plays Silent Woman, Rodd Redwing as Young Wolf

== Film ==
In 1973, several episodes of the series were compiled together as an overseas theatrical release entitled Call Me By My Rightful Name.

== Syndication ==
The Outcasts aired on the classic TV network GetTV on Sunday mornings between 2016 and 2020. In October 2021, GetTV began airing The Outcasts on Saturday and Sunday mornings.

== Reception ==
The show was criticized for "excessive violence", and was canceled after 26 episodes.

Harlan Ellison deplored the show in his review for the Los Angeles Free Press. The inclusion of a black character, he said, was supposed to illustrate that black people were "normal, functioning members of the society", but the writers and producers were so out of touch that they were incapable of portraying black people as they really are. Citing an episode where Corey seduces an innkeeper's wife while David watches, he conceded that it was realistic to show black/white romance as unthinkable for the time, but that showing David as having normal desires wouldn't have been too much to ask: instead, "the black man is allowed to vent his frustration and loneliness and hostility only through the use of the gun. We know what jingo propaganda that parallels."

== Awards and nominations ==
Year	Award	Category	Recipient	Result
1969	American Cinema Editors, USA	Best Edited Television Program	Norman Colbert	Won
1969	Emmy Award	Outstanding Achievement in Musical Composition	Hugo Montenegro	Nominated
