= Henry Hite =

American actor (1915–1978)

- Born: Henry Marion Mullens; May 1, 1915; Atlanta, Georgia, United States
- Died: May 26, 1978 (aged 63); Los Angeles, California, United States
- Other name: Corn King Giant
- Height: 8 ft 2 in (promoted); 7 ft 6¾ in (2.31 m; measured)
- Spouse: Anita

Henry Hite (May 1, 1915 – May 26, 1978) born Henry Marion Mullens, was an American actor, stage performer, media personality and spokesperson who was well known for making personal appearances promoting the Corn King brand (Wilson Certified Meats trade-name) as the "Corn King Giant", and for the occasional movie that would capitalize on his height. Although promoted as "the world's tallest man" at 8 ft 2 in, his actual height was 7 ft 6¾ in (2.31 m).

At age 18, he changed his name to 'Hite' and partnered with 'Lowe' (Roland Picaro), to form a Vaudeville act, later as "Lowe, Hite and Stanley" which included the midget Stanley Ross. Hite's stage career ended in 1962 following the death of Ross.

== Filmography ==
Year	Title	Role	Notes
1937	New Faces of 1937	Giant in "Lowe, Hite and Stanley" act	Credited as Hite
1965	Monster A Go-Go	Frank Douglas/Monster	Considered among the worst films ever made

== See also ==
- Gigantism
