= Blood Harvest (film) =

- Directed by: Bill Rebane
- Written by: Frank Kinikin
- Screenplay by: Ben Benson; Emil Joseph
- Story by: Chris Vaalar; William Arthur
- Produced by: Leszek Burzynski
- Starring: Tiny Tim; Itonia Salchek; Lori Minnetti
- Cinematography: Bill Rebane
- Edited by: Teddy Darvas
- Music by: George Daugherty
- Production company: Shooting Ranch
- Distributed by: Cinema Group
- Release date: January 1, 1987
- Running time: 88 minutes
- Country: United States
- Language: English

Blood Harvest is a 1987 American slasher film directed by Bill Rebane, and starring Tiny Tim, Itonia Salochek and Lori Minnetti. Peter Krause appears in his first feature film role.

== Plot ==
We open on the death of Gary and Merv's parents, seemingly murdered and then taken away by paramedics. Jill Robinson arrives back in her small hometown, having returned from college. She learns that the townspeople are not happy with her father, a banker who has been foreclosing on family farms in the area. She meets her friend Sarah at the diner she works at and gets a ride home, only to find her parents missing and the house has been vandalized. She also finds Merv in their kitchen acting odd and is dressed as a clown, having assumed the identity of "The Marvelous Mervo". Also in their house is her childhood neighbor/one-time lover Gary, who is also Merv's brother and caretaker. He takes Merv and leaves.

She continues to experience harassment and visits the Sheriff for help, but when they arrive to the house, they find that everything is fixed. Gary arrives later and admits to fixing the windows and repainting the house, and they recount childhood memories in their old treehouse. Jill reveals that she is engaged to a man named Scott, which upsets Gary. Gary also shares that his parents were murdered, and that's why Merv is acting like a literal clown. Merv also is seen bringing food to an unknown woman who is being held hostage.

That night, Jill continues to experience harassment and stalking from both a masked figure and possibly Merv/Mervo. She calls the Sheriff over for help, finds Merv/Mervo on her property and agrees to take him home. After they leave and she goes to sleep, someone sneaks into the house, uses chloroform on her, and sexually assaults her by taking nude photos of her.

The next morning, Jill's fiancé Scott arrives and is primarily focused on making sexual advances towards her. Scott has sex with her while keeping his jeans on, and Gary spies through the window. Scott wants beer afterwards, and leaves to get some from town. He follows a suspicious figure into Jill's parents' barn outside, and is attacked. Gary circles around the house to talk to Jill, but is interrupted by Merv/Mervo and leaves to take him home. Sarah arrives and stays for a little while, and then leaves to go to work at the diner. Sarah goes outside and is attacked by the masked figure, and is taken to the barn and killed.

Gary comes back to see Jill, and when Jill learns that Sarah never made it to work and Scott has not returned, he suggests that Sarah and Scott fell in love and left to elope. This upsets Jill, who falls asleep on the living room couch and is drugged again by the masked figure. The masked figure tries to bring Jill to the barn with the others, but when the Sheriff arrives to check out the house, she is left on the couch until he leaves. Scott was tied up and left alive, but his throat is slit by the masked figure.

Jill wakes up and finds a bucket of blood in her fridge. She collapses in tears, and Gary somehow was already in the house and comes right to her side. He takes her upstairs, undresses her and bathes her, and carries her downstairs back to the couch. While Jill is sleeping, Gary undresses and climbs on top of her. Jill comes to and pushes him away, but tries to understand why he is behaving like a sex predator. She asks him to leave, and he does. Merv/Mervo arrives after, asking her to follow him.

Merv/Mervo takes her to their house, and shows her their parents' suicide note, revealing that their bodies were staged to look like it was murder. Jill is also shown the photos of her naked and sleeping, revealing that Gary is the masked figure and perpetrator of these crimes. Gary arrives and fights Merv/Mervo, and Jill finds a gun and confusingly shoots Merv/Mervo. Gary tries to relax her and assure her that they can now be together forever, and she runs off through the woods. Gary is able to corner her, knock her out and take her to the barn.

Jill comes to and finds the bodies of her father, Scott and Sarah. Gary gives a deranged monologue, wherein he blames Jill for his parents' suicide and having to take care of The Marvelous Mervo. He insists that since everyone he loves is dead, he believed killing everyone she loves would bring them together. He decides he is just going to kill her, but Merv/Mervo (not dead) intervenes and shoots Gary. Merv/Mervo explains that Gary threatened him to keep his crimes a secret, and they both walk out of the barn together. Gary is later revealed to still be alive and opens his eyes, although there is no follow up with the tied-up woman (presumably Jill's mother).

== Cast ==
- Tiny Tim as Mervon Dickenson/The Marvelous Mervo/The Clown
- Itonia Salochek as Jill Robinson
- Dean West as Gary Dickenson
- Lori Minnetti as Sarah
- Peter Krause as Scott
- Frank Benson as Sheriff Buckley
- Albert Jaggard as The Priest
- William Dexter as Man in Cafe
- Arlene Dexter as 1st Bank Teller
- Jeanette Belant as 2nd Bank Teller
- Pete Van Ryan as Auctioneer
- Harvey Woodward as Assistant Auctioneer
- Randy Scott as Game Player
- Chris Jahnke as Game Player
- Jim Zabella as Game Player
- Dave Doyle as Game Player

== Production ==
Alternate titles include "Nightmare" and "The Marvelous Mervo". Blood Harvest was filmed in three Wisconsin locations: Gleason, Irma and Merrill.

== Release ==
Blood Harvest was released on January 1, 1987.

=== Home media ===
A Blu-ray version featuring a new 4k scan of the original 16mm camera negative was released by Vinegar Syndrome in October 2018. The first 1,500 copies featured a limited edition slipcover. Special features on the Blu-ray include:

== Reception and legacy ==
Allmovie called Blood Harvest "an obvious stab at a piece of the dwindling slasher market shot on cheap, grainy stock with a small, amateur cast", writing that "those who appreciate Tiny Tim for his astonishing vocal range and vast repertoire of turn-of-the-century Tin Pan Alley songs will feel depressed watching him debase himself", but that "others might find enjoyment in a particularly wretched slasher fiasco that should provide derisive yucks for genre fans.

Squanch Games licensed the film to be used in their 2022 video game High on Life. The opening scene can be seen on the TV in the main character's living room after defeating the first three bounties.
