= The Blackout (2009 film) =

- theatrical release poster
- Directed by: Robert David Sanders
- Written by: Jim Beck
- Produced by: Barbara Streifel Sanders; David Malcolm; Charles Ross; Gilbert Streifel; John Van Horn
- Starring: Barbara Streifel Sanders; Joseph Dunn; Ian Malcolm; Michael Caruso; Caroline Rich; Anthony Tedesco; James Martinez
- Cinematography: Mark W. Ross
- Edited by: Robert David Sanders
- Music by: Justin R. Durban
- Distributed by: Starway Pictures
- Release date: December 24, 2009
- Running time: 80 minutes
- Country: United States
- Language: English

The Blackout is a 2009 American science fiction horror film directed by Robert David Sanders and starring Barbara Streifel Sanders, Joseph Dunn, Ian Malcolm, Michael Caruso, Caroline Rich, Anthony Tedesco, and James Martinez. The film follows the occupants of The Ravenwood as they try to escape the building during a citywide blackout while being stalked by terrifying creatures.

== Plot ==
The film takes place during Christmas Eve when a citywide blackout traps the tenants in The Ravenwood.

As the building's occupants try to escape the building they find themselves stalked and attacked by terrifying creatures. The group must work together in order to escape and survive the blackout.

== Cast ==
- Barbara Streifel Sanders as Elizabeth Pierce
- Joseph Dunn as Daniel Pierce
- Ian Malcolm as Dylan Pierce
- Michael Caruso as Ethan Devane
- Caroline Rich as Claire Devane
- Anthony Tedesco as Freddy Appleton
- James Martinez as Eddie Clifton

== Release ==
The Blackout was released in the United States on December 24, 2009. In Spain the film was premiered on television on September 30, 2012. The film was released on DVD on August 30, 2013. The film was released on DVD in the UK on August 30, 2010, on March 30, 2009 it was announced that Starway Pictures had acquired rights to distribute the film internationally and Cinemavault distributing the film in Canada.

== Reception ==
Scott A. Johnson from Dread Central awarded the film a score of 2.5 out of 5, writing, "Although admirably ambitious for what was obviously a very low budget creature feature, I do believe another rewrite or two and a more charismatic cast were the ills that prevented The Blackout from shining brighter than it did." HorrorNews.net gave the film a negative review, criticizing the story as being "trite and too convenient". Andrew Smith from Popcorn Pictures gave the film a score of 4/10, writing, "The Blackout is paint-by-numbers monster movie making at its most predictable. A few decent ideas are dwarfed by the rehash of a lot of plagiarized ideas. Ambition seems to have been held back by budget or unwillingness to experiment with the formula and that’s a pity."
