= Croaked: Frog Monster from Hell =

- DVD cover for 'Croaked: Frog Monster from Hell'
- Directed by: Bill Rebane
- Written by: Lyoma Denetz; Jerry Gregoris; Mike Landers
- Produced by: Jerry Gregoris; Bill Rebane
- Starring: Karen McDiarmid; Alan Ross; Brad Ellingson; Jerry Gregoris; Glenn Scherer
- Cinematography: Bela St. Jon
- Edited by: Bill Rebane
- Music by: Bruce Malm
- Distributed by: Troma Entertainment
- Release date: 1980
- Running time: 93 minutes
- Language: English

Croaked: Frog Monster from Hell (also known as Rana: The Legend of Shadow Lake) is a 1980 American monster movie directed by Bill Rebane. The plot of Croaked involves a group of loggers terrorized by a vicious half-man/half-frog creature. The film was distributed by Troma Entertainment and aired first on television before going to video.

In his book All I Need to Know About Filmmaking I Learned from The Toxic Avenger, Troma president Lloyd Kaufman lists this film as one of the five worst Troma films ever made (along with The Capture of Bigfoot, also directed by Bill Rebane).

== Plot ==
When a fortune is discovered at the bottom of a lake, a diver is out to get it, even when he discovers that the loot is being guarded by an awful underwater beast.

== Cast ==
- Paul Callaway and Richard Lange as Rana
- Glenn Scherer as Kelly Sr.
- Brad Ellingson as Kelly Jr.
- Karen McDiarmid as Elli
- Alan Ross as John
- Julie Wheaton as Susan
- Jerry Gregoris as Charlie
- Jim Iaquinta as Burley, Rana
- Bruno Alexander as Cal
- Michael Skewes as Mike
- Doreen Moze as Chris
- Angailica as Baby Rana (as Angel Rebane)

== Release ==
=== Home media ===
The film was released on VHS and Betamax in 1986 by Active Home Video. The VHS was later reissued in 1991 by Burbank Video. It was released for the first time on DVD by BCI, in a 3-disk multi feature set on August 24, 2004. BCI would re-release the film as a part of a 10-disk multi feature collection on October 5, 2005.

== Reception ==
John Noonan from HorrorNews.net wrote, "By all accounts this should be a fun and frivolous massacred by Mother Nature genre of movie. Instead, even at an 86 minute running time, it feels like Croaked is charging through treacle towards a wholly unsurprising and unsatisfying ending."

== Trivia ==
Lead actress Karen McDiarmid went on to become the spokesperson for the ShopKo chain of discount department stores. She appeared in television ads for the retailer from 1976 to 1996, as is better known to the public as the "ShopKo Lady."
