= The Dead Talk Back =

- Directed by: Merle S. Gould
- Written by: Merle S. Gould
- Produced by: Merle S. Gould
- Starring: Aldo Farnese
- Cinematography: Andrew Farnese
- Edited by: Aldo Farnese
- Production company: Headliner Productions
- Release date: 1993
- Running time: 65 minutes
- Country: United States
- Language: English

The Dead Talk Back is an American crime drama film written, produced, and directed by Merle S. Gould. Although produced in 1957, it was not released until 1993. The film addresses topical subjects, including investigations, metaphysics, murder, police, and scientists.

== Plot ==
Scientist Henry Krasker (Aldo Farnese) experiments in speaking with the dead. He is also an occasional consultant for the Los Angeles Police Department, and has solved numerous cases through extraordinary means. He lives in a rooming house that's convenient to his laboratory and is also home to others from various walks of life.

After one of his rooming housemates, Renee Caldwell (Laura Brock), is murdered with a crossbow, Los Angeles police detectives Lt. Lewis (Scott Douglas) and Harry (Earl Sands) enlist Krasker to aid them in apprehending the suspect, who they believe resides at the same rooming house.

After an extensive investigation of the residents, Krasker devises a plan to draw out the killer. After calling a meeting of the suspects, Krasker brings Renee back from the dead, leading Raymond Millbrun (Myron Natwick), a DJ from San Francisco with wealthy parents, to exclaim that he knew he didn't kill her.

However, it turns out to be a ruse: Krasker did not actually bring Renee back from the dead; he merely staged it in the belief that the killer would confess. Raymond had secretly married Renee in Mexico and she had been blackmailing him into silence for fear his parents would cut him out of their will.

With the killer in custody, the narrator (i.e., Lt. Lewis) muses over whether anyone will actually be able to contact the dead and wishes Krasker well in his experiments.

== Cast ==
- Aldo Farnese as Henry Krasker
- Scott Douglas as Lt. Lewis
- Laura Brock as Renee Caldwell (Note: Some cast names may be inaccurate due to the opening and end credits being handwritten.)
- Earl Sands as Harry
- Myron H. Natwick as Raymond Milburn
- Kyle Stanton as Christy Mattling
- Sammy Ray as Tony Pettini
- Curtis Roberts as Frits Kreuger (corrupted form of Fritz Krueger)
- Don Parker as Don Harris
- Jane Pritchard as Hope Byington
- Rose Gorman as Alice Corman
- Betty Ruth as Sara Stholl (corrupted form of Sara Stoll)
- Matt Maracco (Note: Written as Mat Maracco in the opening credits.) as Harold Yonger
- Lynn Douglas as first photo receptionist
- Eileen Leavitt as second photo receptionist
- Dennis Gould as Denny
- Ronnie Gould as Ronny
- Betty Winnick as photo customer
- Grace Quinn as photographer's model
- Gil Martin as policeman
- J. S. Serfozo as policeman

== Production ==
The Dead Talk Back was written, produced, and directed by Merle S. Gould. The film's production company was Headliner Productions, Inc.

Andrew Farnese was the cinematographer, Betty Schwartz was the art director, Aldo Farnese was the film editor, and Roland Schneider was in charge of sound. The costumes in the film were made by Wynn's. Jean Gerard was the production supervisor, Stan Pritchard was the production assistant, and Velmer Bahrenburg was the tech advisor.

Parts of the film were filmed in Lewin's Records Center, Benny's of Hollywood, and on Hollywood Boulevard. The Grauman's Chinese Theatre is visible in the background of the film. Produced in black and white, The Dead Talk Back contains intermittent voice-over narration by Aldo Farnese and Scott Douglas.

== Release ==
The Dead Talk Back was completed in 1957, but never had a theatrical release and was not distributed until it was discovered in 1993. Sinister Cinema acquired the rights to the film from Headliner Productions. It was then released on home video and later shown on the movie-mocking comedy television series Mystery Science Theater 3000 in 1994.

== Reception ==
The Dead Talk Back is part of The Psychotronic Video Guide, published in 1996 by Michael J. Weldon.

The Dead Talk Back was featured and reviewed in the book 150 Movies You Should Die Before You See by Steve Miller. The book was published in 2010 by Simon & Schuster. Miller wrote that "A rooming house full of bizarre possible suspects, an unusual detective, and a suitably twisted solution to the case ... The Dead Talk Back could have been a fun, quirky mystery film. But then it went in for bad acting, inept direction, shoddy camera-work, badly done lighting, and horrendous editing. Even a second draft on the script would have helped." Miller also commented that "The Worst Script Award goes to Merle S. Gould for his attempts to infuse the film with a 'hardboiled detective' that are so over-blown they ruin what could have been a cool murder scene" and that the "You Made James Randi Cry Award goes to Merle S. Gould for conceiving an experiment in otherworldly communication that involves a speaker, some wire, a wineglass, and a razor blade."

The Dead Talk Back was reviewed in the 2015 book Spinegrinder: The Movies Most Critics Won't Write About. In it, author Clive Davies writes that "It's no worse than others from the period, but don't expect a neglected gem. A bearded 'Private Investigator' and mad scientist (that's more like it) introduces the very slow-moving tale from his basement lab where he has a device for talking to the dead (it looks like a rock). 'Oh it's true,' he exclaims before narrating a long flashback that's mostly cops interrogating the prime suspects in a murder-by-crossbow case. The ending is straight out of a Tod Slaughter movie."

=== Mystery Science Theater 3000 ===
The Dead Talk Back was featured in episode #603 of the movie-mocking comedy television series Mystery Science Theater 3000, first airing on Comedy Central on July 4, 1994, with the short "The Selling Wizard." John Sinnott reviewed the episode in 2005 for DVD Talk, writing, "In this early Mike episode, he and the 'bots make a valiant effort to trash the film, but it only partially succeeds. There are long patches of the movie where nothing really happens and it's really hard to riff someone walking down the street. The jokes start out good, but by the end of the film you can tell that the writers were really scratching their heads for something, anything, to say about the film. Not a bad effort, but not a great one either."

Mystery Science Theater 3000 writer Paul Chaplin seemed to agree about the lack of action and material to react to; in a recap of the episode, he wrote, "Sorry if I didn't give you much detail on the movie. There actually is detail in the film, but each detail exists in perfect isolation, unconnected to any other detail. .. What I'm saying is it's a bad movie. It's a bold statement, and I'll stand by it."

Writer Jim Vorel ranked the episode #164 (out of 197 total MST3K episodes) in his ranking of episodes from the series's first 12 seasons. Calling Krasker "a goofy little mad scientist—very much a would-be Herbert West type," Vorel noted the dark print of the movie used in the episode, which helped make it "painful" to watch.

The MST3K version of the film was released by Rhino Home Video as part of the Mystery Science Theater 3000 Collection, vol. 8 DVD set. It was re-released by Shout Factory on November 15, 2018. The other episodes in the four-disc set include Hobgoblins (episode #907), The Phantom Planet (episode #902), and Monster a Go-Go (episode #421).
