= Dickory Doc =

American children's television series

Dickory Doc with All His Friends

Dickory Doc is a local children's television series which aired from 1966 to 1969. The show was produced by Kaiser Broadcasting and broadcast on UHF Channel 48 WKBS-TV in Philadelphia, Pennsylvania and on UHF Channel 56 WKBG-TV in Boston, Massachusetts and number of other major cities. The show was created by Aldo Farnese (Dickory Doc) and Chic Laganella.

== Premise ==
In his toy shop at the North Pole he makes toys for Santa Claus to give away on Christmas Eve. He's assisted by his puppet elves Choo-Choo, Professor Schnitzel, Jingle Jim, Little Jock, Mr. Bigsby the Buka Bird and Riddles. Supermailman, who flies in delivering mail every day and there are friends that drop by occasionally like Abby the Adorable Snowman and Puff the Flameless Dragon (A.K.A. Puffy).

The show was produced and created by Aldo Farnese (Dickory Doc) and Chic Laganella (Supermailman). They both supplied most of the voices of the puppets.

=== Albums ===
Two albums were produced at the time of the show:

- Dickory Doc with All His Friends.
- More Dickory Doc Vol.2.

Recorded Under the Direction of Chic Laganella and Aldo Farnese Produced by Buzz Curtis, Music Arranged & Conducted by Dick Caruso on an independent label "Piper Records". Album liner notes by Alan Baker.

== After the show ==
Aldo went on to play the title character in Adam Android, also created and produced by Aldo Farnese and Chic Laganella and using most of the same puppets. Unlike the cold snowy setting of the North Pole, this show took place on a spaceship.

== Dickory Doc with all his Friends Album ==
Tracks

SIDE 1

1. Theme-Introduction with Doc Choo-Choo sings “PLAYMATE”
2. Doc & Jungle Jim Sing “A FROG HE WOULD A-WOO-ING GO”
3. Mr. Bigsby Sings “ABC SONG”
4. Doc & Little Jock Sing “FRERE JACQUES”
5. Doc & Professor Schnitzel Sing “SCHNITZELBANK”

SIDE 2

1. Doc Sings “THE FOX”
2. Doc is Visited by Supermailman Supermailman Does “TAP DANCE”
3. Doc Visits Abby—Doc & Abby sing “ON TOP OF OLD SMOKEY”
4. Doc Visits Puffy—Puffy Sings “PUFF THE FLAMELESS DRAGON”
5. Doc & All His Friends Sing “HAPPY BIRTHDAY”
6. Doc Bids Farewell and Sings “CLOSING THEME”

== See also ==
- Children's television series
- Puppetry
- Hand puppet
- The Dead Talk Back starring Aldo Farnese
