= Ray Szmanda =

American actor (1926–2018)

- Born: Raymond Jack Szmanda; June 22, 1926; Milwaukee, Wisconsin, U.S.
- Died: May 6, 2018 (aged 91); Antigo, Wisconsin, U.S.
- Occupations: Radio and television announcer
- Years active: 1951–1999
- Spouse: Maxine Szmanda (m. 1950; died 2000)
- Website: http://www.menardsguy.com/

Raymond Jack "Ray" Szmanda, Sr. (June 22, 1926 – May 6, 2018) was an American radio and television announcer known throughout the Midwestern United States as the spokesperson for Menards.

== Early life ==
Szmanda was born in Milwaukee, Wisconsin and served in the United States Navy during World War II.

== Career ==
Szmanda trained at the American Institute of the Air and took writing courses from the University of Wisconsin–Milwaukee and University of Wisconsin–Madison.

He worked for radio and television stations as a staff announcer from 1951 to 1958, when he began to freelance. From 1959 to 1978, he operated the Trans-American School of Broadcasting in his hometown of Wausau, Wisconsin.

His career with Menards began in 1976, where he was a fixture of the ads until his retirement in 1998. He did, however, make occasional ads with the company starting in 1999, such as Embers America. Szmanda also appeared in the 1970s science fiction movie The Alpha Incident and hosted the Wausau version of High Quiz Bowl. He also served as co-anchor at KDFW-TV in Dallas, Texas from 1975 to 1978.

== Death ==
Szmanda died on May 6, 2018, at age 91, of pneumonia, heart problems and complications from a fall.
