= David Alan Smith (actor) =

American actor and writer (born 1959)

- Born: David Alan Smith; June 23, 1959 (age 67); Beaver Dam, Wisconsin, U.S.
- Occupation: Actor
- Years active: 1988–present
- Spouse: Susan Koenig (m. 1977; div. 1999)

David Alan Smith (born June 23, 1959) is an American actor and writer.

== Personal life ==
Smith was born in Beaver Dam, Wisconsin. He attended Lincoln Elementary School and Beaver Dam High School, before studying at the University of Minnesota, where he received his BA in theatre, as well as being nominated for the National Irene Ryan Acting Award at the American College Theatre Festival.

He has been in over 500 radio and television commercials for brands including Target, SuperAmerica, Hillshire Farm, Cub Foods and John Deere. He has appeared in more than 75 stage productions, including lead roles in Rosencrantz and Guildenstern Are Dead in Minneapolis, Run for Your Wife at Wausau, Wisconsin, and A Closer Walk with Patsy Cline, at Plymouth Playhouse, Twin Cities.

A reviewer wrote that in Run for Your Wife, "Smith played the beleaguered bigamist, John Smith, to weary perfection. His British accent was believable and his physical comedy flawless." A reviewer of Rosencrantz and Guildenstern Are Dead wrote, "They are a nicely matched pair exhibiting just enough shadings of difference to make them more than ciphers. ... Smith's Guildenstern is a more practical, moody sort, who cannot understand their impending fate."

== Filmography ==
=== Film ===
Year	Title	Role	Notes
1988	Twister's Revenge!	Kelly	Sound Effects Assistant
1995	The Cure	Garbage Man #2	
1995	Trial by Fire	Bailiff	TV movie
1995	In the Line of Duty: Hunt for Justice	Walter Ellison	TV movie
1996	Feeling Minnesota	Detective Lloyd	
2003	Baadasssss!	Brewster	
2005	The Secret Parts of Fortune	Mr. Jenkins / Polonius	Short
2011	Not Another Not Another Movie	Brian	
2015	When Duty Calls	Mr. Henderson	TV movie
2018	Desolate	Motel Clerk	

=== Television ===
Year	Title	Role	Notes
1995	America's Most Wanted: America Fights Back	Edwin Lindsey	1 episode
2003	The Mullets	EJ	1 episode
2004	The Tracy Morgan Show	Sol	1 episode
2005	Jake in Progress	Clown	1 episode
2011	Sons of Anarchy	Bishop	1 episode
2019	The Kids Are Alright	The Great Pepe	1 episode

=== Other works ===
Year	Title	Role	Notes
1986	Rosencrantz and Guildenstern Are Dead	Guildenstern	Minnesota Shakespeare Company, Minneapolis
1987	Edgar Allan Poe - A One Man Show	Author	Stage Production
1988–1991	Northwoods Magazine	Producer and Host	Wisconsin tourism TV program
1989	Run for Your Wife	Director; lead role: John Smith	Wausau Community Theatre
1994	A Closer Walk with Patsy Cline	Co-star: radio DJ	Plymouth Playhouse, Twin Cities: musical revue
1997	Footsteps of Faith	Author	Musical
1998	How to Talk Minnesotan: The Holiday Musical	Ed Humde	Plymouth Playhouse
2002	Animal Farm	Director	Palmdale Playhouse
2004	The Hobbit	Director	Palmdale Playhouse
2005	The Jungle Book	Director	Palmdale Playhouse
2006	The Choice	Director	Palmdale Playhouse
