= The Giant Spider Invasion =

1975 horror/sci-fi film by Bill Rebane

- Theatrical release poster
- Directed by: Bill Rebane
- Screenplay by: Richard L. Huff; Robert Easton
- Based on: From an original story by Richard L. Huff
- Produced by: Bill Rebane; Richard L. Huff
- Starring: Steve Brodie; Barbara Hale; Leslie Parrish; Alan Hale; Robert Easton
- Cinematography: Jack Willoughby
- Edited by: Barbara Pokras
- Music by: Bill Rebane
- Production companies: Transcentury Pictures; A Cinema Group 75 Film
- Distributed by: Group 1 International Distribution Organization Ltd.
- Release date: October 1975
- Running time: 80 minutes
- Country: United States
- Language: English
- Budget: $300,000
- Box office: $15 million or $2,347,000

The Giant Spider Invasion is a 1975 American science fiction horror film that was produced, composed and directed by Bill Rebane. The independent film, which stars Steve Brodie, Barbara Hale, Robert Easton, Leslie Parrish, and Alan Hale, follows giant spiders that arrive during a meteor shower and terrorize the town of Merrill, Wisconsin, and the surrounding area. Group 1 Films theatrically released the film in 1975 and it enjoyed a successful run to become one of the top-50-grossing films of that year.

The Giant Spider Invasion received negative reviews upon release, and has since achieved a cult following after its broadcast in a 1997 episode of Mystery Science Theater 3000. The film was shown at a Bill Rebane-themed film festival in 2005 and a musical remake of the film was planned.

== Plot ==
A meteor streaks across the night sky while a revival meeting arrives at the town of Merrill, Wisconsin. Instead of attending the revival meeting, as he told his wife Ev, farmer Dan Kester spends the evening with a local waitress named Helga. Ev is drinking when newspaper reporter Davey Perkins picks up his girlfriend, Terry, Ev’s sister, from the Kester farm. As they leave, Ev continues drinking and later requests a delivery from Dutch, the owner of a café. Davey and Terry drive to a junkyard where they engage in a romantic encounter. After finishing with Helga, Dan listens to the revival on the radio as he drives home. As he arrives, a meteor crashes on his property, triggering strong winds and electrical malfunctions.

A patrolling B-52 bomber reports a magnetic anomaly before crashing. Sheriff Jones begins receiving calls from locals about electrical disturbances. Dr. Jenny Langer, an astronomer at Montclair Observatory, contacts NASA to report unusual gamma-ray activity linked to the anomaly. At NASA, Dr. Vance receives reports from Northern Wisconsin and, suspecting the downed B-52 and the gamma-ray activity are connected, travels there to investigate. At Montclair Observatory, he meets with Dr. Langer, who briefs him on her findings. The Kesters, meanwhile, discover dead cattle on their farm and strange rocks near the meteor site. Dan cracks open a rock, unknowingly releasing a spider, and believes a crystal inside is a diamond. Ev, heavily intoxicated, swats at spiders that Dan dismisses as hallucinations. Later, Dan discovers a dead motorcyclist on the property; he buries the body and hides the motorcycle to avoid police attention. That night, a giant spider attacks and kills Ev.

The next morning, Dan takes the crystal he found to his cousin Billy, who confirms it is an industrial-grade diamond. After the Sheriff inquires about the missing motorcyclist, Dan returns to the meteor site, where a giant spider kills him. Billy visits the farm and fails to seduce Terry; he is attacked in his car, which he crashes into a gas station and dies in the explosion. Langer and Vance continue searching for the meteor's impact site, suspecting it is on the Kesters' property. The giant spider destroys the Kesters' house and Terry is seriously injured. Davey, who fails to stop the spider with gunfire, rescues Terry and takes her to the hospital. The spider attacks Langer and Vance, who escape and inform the Sheriff. In response, Dutch organizes a posse but the spider shifts its attention to a local carnival, prompting Sheriff Jones to call in the National Guard. Langer and Vance, deducing that the spiders likely entered through a mini black hole, arranges for a neutron device to be dropped at the meteor's impact site. The plan succeeds and the giant spider is obliterated, dissolving into a pile of goo.

== Cast ==
- Steve Brodie as Dr. Vance
- Barbara Hale as Dr. Jenny Langer
- Robert Easton as Dan Kester
- Leslie Parrish as Ev Kester
- Alan Hale as Sheriff Jones
- Bill Williams as Dutch
- Kevin Brodie as Dave Perkins
- Dianne Lee Hart as Terry Kester
- Tain Bodkin as Preacher
- Paul Bentzen as Billy Kester
- J. Stewart Taylor as Deputy
- Christiana Schmidtmer as Helga
- William W. Gillett, Jr. as Rider

== Production ==
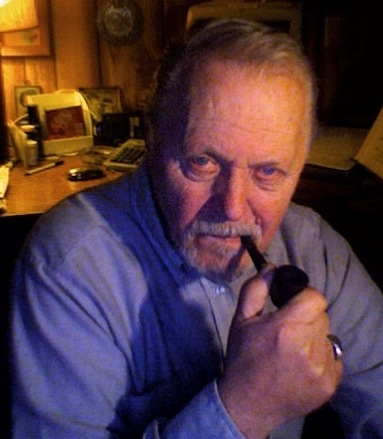
The Giant Spider Invasion was directed and co-produced by Bill Rebane.

The Giant Spider Invasion was originally conceived by Richard Huff. Huff and Robert Easton, an actor and friend of Bill Rebane, were tasked with writing the script. No script was available by the time film began due to creative differences and only pages of dialogue had been written. To motivate Easton, who was told to write 10 to 15 pages a day, the producers locked him in a cabin and told him to finish the daily task or he would not be fed. Rebane's wife Barbara worked as the script girl. The cast of the film consisted of Hollywood veterans. It was tentatively titled The Great Spider Invasion.

The Giant Spider Invasion was filmed in Gleason, Tomahawk, and Merrill, Wisconsin, in six weeks with a budget of $300,000. The University of Wisconsin–Stevens Point was also used for filming. William Dyke, a former mayor of Madison, Wisconsin, and future Wisconsin Circuit Court Judge, was an uncredited executive producer, helping to fund and find a distributor for the film. Special-effects artist Bob Millay was hired to design the spiders for the film. Jack Willoughby was the cinematographer. Tarantulas, which the special-effects crew sent by truck from Arizona, were used in portions of the film to portray spider hatchlings.

While attempting to film a scene in which the giant spider explodes, the effects team covered the prop with gunpowder and had a crew member attempt to ignite it with matches. Despite using the entire box of matches, the spider did not explode and Rebane decided to stop filming. Immediately after they stopped, the spider exploded, causing severe burns to two crew members who were later taken to the hospital.

== Release ==
The Giant Spider Invasion was distributed by Group 1 International Distribution Organization and was released in theaters in October 1975. Rebane said in an interview with Fangoria in 1996 that the movie grossed $15 million, while Turner Classic Movies said the movie made a $22 million return. In the United States and Canada, rentals of the movie in 1976 grossed $2,347,000. On television, it was featured on The CBS Late Movie. The Giant Spider Invasion was released on DVD by multiple video companies, including Retromedia in 2002 and MVD Visual as a director's cut on May 5, 2009. It was released on Blu-ray on June 15, 2015, by VCI Entertainment.

== Reception ==
In 1976, Brandlon L. Chase, the president of distributor Group 1 International Distribution Organization, won the Outstanding Executive Achievement award at the Academy of Science Fiction, Fantasy and Horror Films. Linda Gross, writing for Los Angeles Times, called The Giant Spider Invasion a "poorly done combination of science fiction, Jaws, and Day of the Locust." Gross was critical of the film's script and Rebane's direction, but said she thought the spiders were scary. Glenn Garvin from The Delta Democrat-Times described the movie as "self-subconsciously ludicrous", and said when he watched it, children at the screening were laughing instead of being scared by the film. Albuquerque Journal's Chuck Mittlestadt gave the film a warmer reception, giving positive marks for its editing and direction. Mittlestadt also gave praise to Barbara Hale, Kevin Brodie, and Alan Hale's acting.

Michael Weldon, in The Psychotronic Encyclopedia of Film, criticized the special effects and compared them negatively to The Giant Claw, but considered the movie to be funny. A review in Leonard Maltin's 1998 Movie & Video Guide said: "Veteran cast can't do much for this tacky horror opus filmed in Wisconsin". VideoHound's Golden Movie Retriever gave the film one star, while Robert Firsching from Allmovie gave it one star out of five, writing negatively about Rebane's direction and the movie's use of humor. Blockbuster Entertainment gave the film one star and said the unintentional laughs from the film quickly wore thin. The film is listed as one of "The 100 Most Enjoyably Bad Movies Ever Made" in the book The Official Razzie Movie Guide by Golden Raspberry Award founder John Wilson. Wired listed The Giant Spider Invasion as one of the "cheesiest movies" ever made.

=== Mystery Science Theater 3000 ===
On May 31, 1997, The Giant Spider Invasion was featured on the Sci-Fi Channel in a season-eight episode of Mystery Science Theater 3000 (MST3K), a comedy television series in which the character Mike Nelson, and his robot friends Crow T. Robot and Tom Servo, are forced to watch "bad films" as part of an ongoing scientific experiment. The film's director, Bill Rebane, said the episode is strange but accepted it due to its popularity. During the episode, Pearl, Brain Guy, and Bobo are camping when they inadvertently unleash Body Snatcher aliens that affect Pearl, Brain Guy and all the bots. Bobo destroys the aliens to bring back the affected characters and return them to normal. This causes Pearl to force the SOL crew to watch the movie again.

In 2006, Rhino Entertainment released the MST3K episode as part of a ten-volume DVD collection of the series, along with Godzilla vs. Megalon, Swamp Diamonds, and Teen-Age Strangler. The boxset was later recalled due to the rights to Godzilla vs. Megalon being disputed. It was redistributed in the "Volume 10.2" collection in 2008, with Godzilla vs. Megalon replaced by The Giant Gila Monster. On August 15, 2019, The Giant Spider Invasion was featured as a Rifftrax live show.

The "Bill Rebane Film Festival" took place in Madison, Wisconsin, in May 2005; it was hosted by MST3K stars Michael J. Nelson and Kevin Murphy, the voice of Tom Servo.

== Legacy ==
In a 2012 interview with Wisconsin television station WSAW-TV, Rebane said he was not sure how The Giant Spider Invasion became popular, and that while it grossed millions of dollars over the past 35 years, he never saw a fraction of the money, calling the film "one of the most pirated movies in history". Rebane said he was proud of the economic impact the movie had on Merrill, Wisconsin. Also in 2012, film historian Bill Dexter found the shells of the two 30-foot (9.1 m) spiders and intended to restore them to their original form. In 2013, Rebane reported the shell of one of the main giant spiders had been stolen. Weeks later, a recycling facility announced the giant spider was taken to them as scrap metal.

In 2011, it was announced the movie was going to be remade into a musical. The rights to the film and one of the giant spiders were auctioned by Julien's Auctions in 2024. In 2025, Rebane announced he would be filming, and adding new scenes and characters to the film for a 2026 release, hoping to fix issues with which Rebane had problems.

== See also ==
- List of American films of 1975
- Monster film
- List of American independent films
- Film industry in Wisconsin
