= Bill Rebane =

American politician and film director (born 1937)

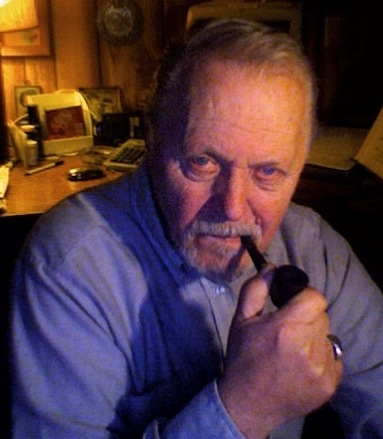
- Rebane in 2010
- Born: Ito Rebane; February 8, 1937 (age 89); Riga, Latvia
- Other name: Bill Rebane
- Education: Art Institute of Chicago
- Occupations: Film director Film producer Screenwriter
- Years active: 1963–present
- Known for: Low budget films
- Notable work: The Giant Spider Invasion
- Spouse: Barbara J. Rebane (m.1957-December 14, 2014; her death)
- Children: Randolph Rebane, Angailica, Jutta Rebane, and Kathy Rebane

Ito "Bill" Rebane (born February 8, 1937) is an American film director, producer, and screenwriter. He is best known for low budget movies such as Monster a Go-Go and The Giant Spider Invasion. Rebane also ran for Governor of Wisconsin in 1979 and 2002 as the American Reform Party candidate.

== Biography ==
Rebane came to the United States from Latvia in 1952 at age 15. His mother was Latvian and his father, Arnold Rebane, was Estonian.

He attended school in post-war Germany as a child, becoming conversant in four languages: Estonian, Latvian, German and Russian. By watching American cinema, he was able to master English. He attended the Art Institute of Chicago/Goodman Theatre, majoring in drama. During that time he also worked as a radio announcer, actor, singer, and tap dancer.

== Accomplishments ==
As stated on the official Bill Rebane website:

Rebane is credited with the introduction of the first 360 degree (wrap around) motion picture process to the Motion Picture Industry of the world, an innovation that spurred the Cinemax process and today's Rotascope cameras; as the creator of the Wisconsin Film Office; as the producer, director, writer, and cinematographer on 12 independent feature films, all of which have enjoyed successful international theatrical release; as producer/director of one of the fifty top-grossing films of 1975 (The Giant Spider Invasion, $23 million gross); as having produced, directed, edited, and production designed at least one hundred commercial, industrial, corporate image, documentary or promotion films; and for the creation and successful operation of the first full-time feature film studio in the Midwest for over 30 years.

=== Recognition ===
In October 2009, Rebane received the Wisconsin Filmmaker 'Lifetime Achievement Award', presented to him at the 2009 Madison Horror Film Festival.

== Career ==
=== Post-college ===
Rebane's first positions in media included working for WGN-TV in Chicago, where he worked his way through the ranks, beginning with a position in the mailroom, and then as floor manager, assistant producer, and assistant to executive producer. Partaking in production of various live television broadcasts, also allowed him the opportunities as an actor and singer, resulting in appearances on such shows as the courtroom drama series They Stand Accused and the syndicated musical-variety series The International Cafe.

=== Baltes Cinetarium ===
Rebane returned to Germany by age 20, where he met and worked with producer Adalbert Baltes of Hamburg, Germany. Rebane credits working with Baltes as his start in the film industry. After working with Baltes as a production assistant, assistant director, and director on various 'CinemaScope Theatrical Short Subjects' for Baltes Film, in 1959 or 1960 Rebane obtained the United States rights to the Cinetarium circular motion picture process.

Cinetarium was an immersive projection format that used a 23 foot wide domed screen. A circular image on 35mm film was projected upward onto a mirrored sphere mounted near the top of the dome. The result was a seamless normal-looking 360-degree view on all sides of the viewer. Magnetic audio tracks on the film provided four-channel directional stereo that followed the action on screen.

Rebane returned to the U.S. and introduced the proprietary process to the world film industry through United Film and Recording Studios in Chicago, attracting such notables as Samuel Goldwyn, Roy Disney, Jack L. Warner, Hugh Hefner and Mike Todd, Jr. to the process, along with industry professionals from Russia, central Europe and Japan. In the end, although Rebane apparently shot and privately exhibited new Cinetarium footage, no Cinetarium installations or theaters were opened in the US.

By age 22, Rebane was a millionaire. However, his early wealth was temporary, as costs of patents, legal fees and research into means to manufacture vertical projection systems were at the time beyond the financial means of the companies he had formed for development of the process.

=== Early film production ===
Rebane then turned to film production. His first independent production effort was the ten-minute musical theatrical short subject called Twist Craze which was purchased by American International Pictures. The film became an international success both theatrically and financially, and enjoyed a 10-week holdover at the Oriental Theater in Chicago, which until that time was an unheard phenomenon for independent short subject theatrical productions. The film earned twenty times its production cost.

Rebane followed this success with a 20-minute theatrical musical short titled Dance Craze, which surpassed the success of Twist Craze, ultimately being purchased by Crown International Pictures for international release.

=== Radio ===
Rebane's interests in media, and performance, and with the professional contacts he had made, led to his position as co-host of the Germania broadcast at Chicago's WGES radio station, at the time the largest and most popular German-language broadcast in America. As a daily evening one-hour live show, it allowed Rebane to create, produce, and host other radio shows on WKFM, Chicago's first FM station, as well as leaving time open for his day job as national public relations director and assistant advertising director for the American distributor for the German firm Grundig Radio.

=== First science fiction project ===
In 1961 Rebane decided to make a feature film, and in 1963 he began production of the science fiction feature film Terror at Halfday, starring June Travis and Peter Thompson, which marked Rebane's becoming the first producer in Chicago to tackle an independent feature film production with a full union crew and screen actors guild talent. A chance meeting with Ronald Reagan nearly attached Reagan to the film. However, Rebane's financial contacts would not go along, claiming Reagan was a "has been" and not worth the investment. Unable to finance the completion of the film, Rebane sold his completed footage to Herschell Gordon Lewis. Lewis went on to complete the film and release the film as Monster A Go-Go in 1965.

=== Studio Bendestorf ===
At age 23, Rebane returned to Germany as executive-in-charge of U.S. co-productions for Studio Bendestorf, in Bendestorf, Germany, in which he had an interest, opening offices in Chicago and Hollywood. Commuting to and from Germany on a bi-weekly basis, Rebane dealt with the major studios to attract producers to Germany and lower costs of production. Some films which found a partial or full home for production at Bendestorf Studio and through Rebane's contact efforts included $ (Goldie Hawn / Scott Brady), How I Won the War (John Lennon) and The Odessa File (Jon Voight).

=== The Shooting Ranch ===
In the late 1960s, Rebane purchased a farm property near Gleason, Wisconsin and moved there with his family. Apart from the property being used to raise cattle and horses, it also eventually became home to Rebane's studio 'The Shooting Ranch', the facility which was the first full-time feature film studio in the Midwest. 'The Shooting Ranch', held the position of "first and only" for over 30 years, eventually growing to 200 acres (0.81 km^{2}), and producing hundreds of commercials, industrial, and corporate image films, plus a number of theatrical features for international theatrical distribution and exposure.

Rebane acknowledges fellow filmmaker, producer Jerry Gregoris of Chicago, for allowing Rebane directorial and post-production responsibilities and subsequent credits on industrial films made for such clients as the Teamsters union, the Republican Party of Indiana, State Farm Insurance, the City of Chicago, and Wausau Insurance.

Rebane used his studio to produce and direct a number of sci-fi/horror films, the first being Invasion from Inner Earth (1974), screenwritten by his wife Barbara, it was shot in 1973 with the working title of The Selected.

His next film project was The Giant Spider Invasion, starring Alan Hale Jr., Barbara Hale, and Steve Brodie. The film grossed $23 million against its $325,000 production costs. This was followed by Rana: The Legend of Shadow Lake (1981), The Alpha Incident (1978), The Capture of Bigfoot (1979), The Demons of Ludlow (1983) and The Game (1984).

In 1984 Rebane took a break from production to assume the Presidency of The International Picture Show Company in Atlanta, where he took charge of international distribution for such products as Falling in Love Again (Elliott Gould), Slapstick (Jerry Lewis), Land of No Return (William Shatner), and many of the Don Knotts and Tim Conway comedy features.

In 1986, Rebane returned to 'The Shooting Ranch' and hosted a 1950s nostalgia concert. Among the invitees were Forrest Tucker, Jaye P. Morgan, Bill Haley's Comets, and Tiny Tim. Rebane later cast Tiny Tim in Blood Harvest in the role of an insane clown, which was Tim's first and last starring role. Also in 1986, and due to Rebane's ongoing efforts extending from 1969, Wisconsin passed legislation establishing the Wisconsin Film Office.

In 1987, Rebane released Blood Harvest, in 1988 he released Twister's Revenge!, and in 1989 Rebane suffered a stroke, which illness and the costs it incurred led to the closure of his studio.

=== Additional projects ===
In the mid-1990s, after recovery, Rebane and his wife moved to Watersmeet, Michigan where he wrote the book Film funding two-thousand, and in 1999 he moved to Hurley, Wisconsin, where he and his wife ran a hotel and a new film production company called 'Eagle's Nest Productions'. He has developed a variety of different projects, but has had no major releases since Blood Harvest.

=== Filmography ===
==== Films ====
As director/producer

- Monster a Go-Go (1965)
- Invasion from Inner Earth (1974)
- The Giant Spider Invasion (1975)
- The Alpha Incident (1978)
- The Capture of Bigfoot (1979)
- Rana: The Legend of Shadow Lake (1981)
- The Demons of Ludlow (1983)
- The Game (1984)
- Blood Harvest (1987)
- Twister's Revenge! (1988)

==== Television ====
Both Monster a Go-Go and The Giant Spider Invasion were featured on TV's Mystery Science Theater 3000.

=== Critical response ===
Doug Moe of The Capital Times reported that Rebane's film The Giant Spider Invasion, first released in 1975, has a growing cult following, selling out genre festivals such as it did at the Wisconsin Film Festival in 2003.

=== Bibliography ===
- 2000, Film funding two-thousand ISBN 0-9704283-0-8
- 2008, From Roswell with Love ISBN 1-4196-8399-3

=== Personal life ===
Rebane married Barbara J. Rebane in 1957 at age 20. They have four children: Randolph, Jutta, Kathy, and Angailica. All four children have worked in various capacities on his films; Angailica in particular has acted in many of them.
