= Otis Young =

American actor

Otis E. Young
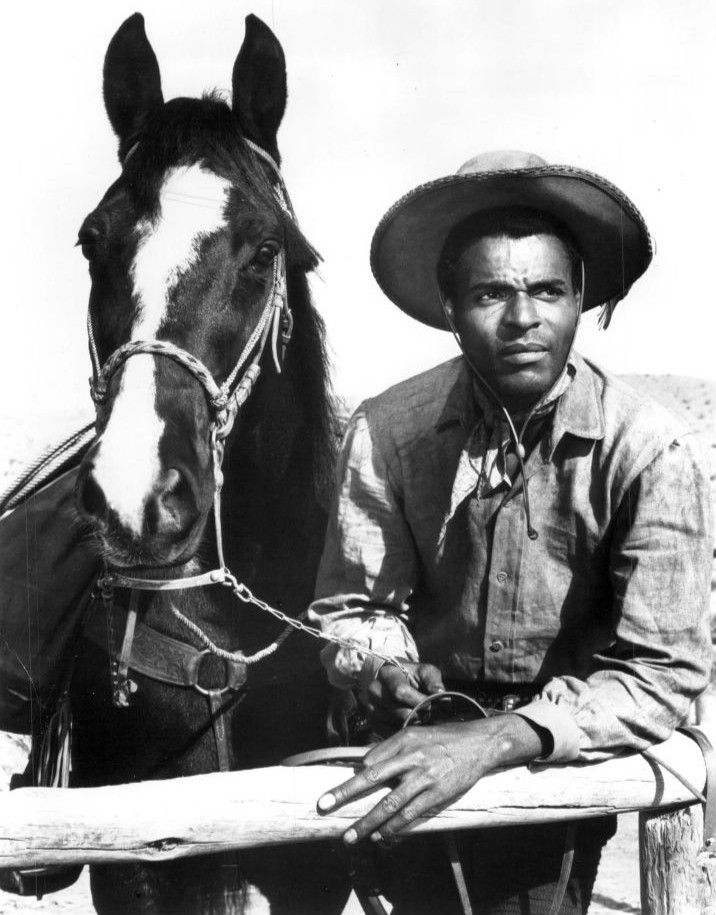
- Young as Jemal David in The Outcasts, 1968.
- Born: July 4, 1932; Providence, Rhode Island, U.S.
- Died: October 12, 2001 (aged 69); Los Angeles County, California, U.S.
- Occupation: Actor

Otis E. Young (July 4, 1932 – October 12, 2001) was an American actor and writer. He co-starred in a television Western, The Outcasts (1968–1969), with Don Murray. Young was the second African-American actor to co-star in a television Western, the first being Raymond St Jacques on the final season of Rawhide in 1965. Young played another memorable role as Jack Nicholson's shore patrol partner Richard "Mule" Mulhall in the 1973 comedy-drama film The Last Detail, and his later film credits included the low budget horror films The Capture of Bigfoot (1979) and Blood Beach (1981).

== Early life and education ==
Young was born in Providence, Rhode Island, one of 14 children. He joined the U.S. Marine Corps at the age of 17 and served in the Korean War. He then enrolled in acting classes at New York University School of Education where one of his classmates was the young Louis Gossett Jr.

== Career ==
He trained at the Neighborhood Playhouse and worked off-Broadway as an actor and writer in the early 1960s. He appeared on Broadway in James Baldwin's Blues for Mister Charlie, with such notables as Diana Sands, and Al Freeman, Jr. His first movie appearance was in Murder in Mississippi (1965). On television, Young portrayed Jemal David, a former slave, in the ABC western The Outcasts (1968-1969). and the season 5 episode "Identity Crisis" in Columbo.

He studied theology at LIFE Bible College in Los Angeles and obtained a Bachelor of Arts in 1983. After, he was ordained pastor, eventually serving as senior pastor of Elim Foursquare Gospel Church in Rochester, New York from 1986 to 1988. He taught acting classes at School Without Walls, a college-like alternative public high school in Rochester, from 1987 through 1991. In 1989 he joined the faculty at Monroe Community College in Rochester; he remained there as a Professor of Communication and head of the Drama Department until his retirement in 1999.

== Death ==
Young suffered a stroke in Los Angeles and died on October 12, 2001, aged 69, at the Veterans Hospital. A memorial ceremony was held at Pepperdine University Chapel.

He was survived by his wife, Barbara, and two sons, two daughters and mother, Gwendolyn.

== Filmography ==
=== Film ===
Year	Title	Role	Notes
1957	The Green Pastures	Young Man	Television film
1965	Murder in Mississippi	Paul Jackson	
1967	Valley of Mystery	Dr. John Quincy	Television film
1967	Counterpoint	USO Bus Driver	Uncredited
1968	Don't Just Stand There!	Bill Elkins	
1968	Me and My Brother		
1972	Call Me by My Rightful Name	Paul	
1973	The Clones	Sawyer	
1973	The Last Detail	Richard "Mule" Mulhall	
1976	Twin Detectives	Cartwright	Television film
1976	Survival	Otis	
1979	The Capture of Bigfoot	Jason	
1980	The Hollywood Knights	Walter	
1980	Blood Beach	Piantadosi	
2001	After Image	Egg Factory Foreman	

=== Television ===
Year	Title	Role	Notes
1963	East Side/West Side	Spanish Teacher	Episode: "I Before E Except After C"
1966	Daktari	Mtaga	Episode: "Leopard of Madla George"
1966	Run for Your Life	Lonsy	Episode: "Tears from a Glass Eye"
1967	Daniel Boone	Adam	Episode: "The Wolf Man"
1968	The F.B.I.	Mike Watson	Episode: "Crisis Ground"
1968–1969	The Outcasts	Jemal David	Main role; 26 episodes
1972	McCloud		Episode: "The Barefoot Stewardess Caper"; uncredited
1975	Get Christie Love!	Jack	Episode: "Too Many Games in Town"
1975	Columbo	Lawrence Melville	Episode: "Identity Crisis"
1976	Cannon	Casimir Grant	Episode: "The Reformer"
1976	Ellery Queen	Joseph Adams Simpson	Episode: "The Adventure of the Sunday Punch"
1980–1981	Palmerstown, U.S.A.	Hoss Washington	3 episodes
1981	Walking Tall	Noah Carver	Episode: "The Protectors of the People"
1983	The Mississippi	Kurland	Episode: "Joey"
1984	Partners in Crime	Willie	Episode: "The Set-Up"
1985	Hill Street Blues	Louis Jessup	Episode: "Passage to Libya"
