= The Demons of Ludlow =

1983 American horror film directed by Bill Rebane

- Original poster
- Directed by: Bill Rebane
- Screenplay by: William Arthur; Alan Ross
- Produced by: Bill Rebane
- Starring: Paul Bentzen; Debra Dulman; Stephenie Cushna; Mary Walden; Carol Perry; Patricia J. Statz
- Cinematography: Bill Rebane
- Edited by: Brita Paretzkin
- Music by: Ric Coken; Steven Kuether
- Production companies: Ram Productions; Titan International Productions
- Distributed by: Trans World Entertainment
- Release date: April 1988
- Running time: 93 minutes
- Country: United States
- Language: English

The Demons of Ludlow is a 1983 American horror film directed and produced by Bill Rebane. The plot revolves around murderous pilgrim demons that lurk inside an antique piano.

== Plot ==
The town of Ludlow has a dark past and when a piano arrives, demons come out to terrorize.

== Cast ==
- Paul Bentzen (as Paul Von Hausen) as Chris the Preacher
- Debra Dulman as Sybil
- Stephenie Cushna as Debra
- Mary Walden as Elenore
- Carol Perry as Ann
- Patricia J. Statz as Emily
- Angailica as Ludlows Daughter

== Release ==
=== Home media ===
The Demons of Ludlow was released on DVD by Video International on March 17, 2008. It was also released on Blu-ray on June 1, 2020, as a part of Arrow Video's Weird Wisconsin: The Bill Rebane Collection boxset.

== Reception ==
TV Guide awarded the film 2/5 stars, stating that the film had "Occasional unsettling moments, but [was] nothing special." Drew Beard from HorrorNews.net panned the film, criticizing the film's acting, lack of production values, and incoherence, stating: "The Demons of Ludlow will please only viewers with highly developed camp sensibilities". Writing for B&S About Movies in 2018, Dustin Fallon compared the film's premise to John Carpenter's The Fog (1980) and noted its low budget, observing that the cast was "comprised almost entirely of actors native to Rebane's home of Wisconsin", most of whom gave "respectable performances"; he concluded that the film "is far from polished, but shines as an example of local filmmaking". Reviewing Arrow Video's Weird Wisconsin box set for Scene-Stealers in 2021, Nick Spacek described the film as "definitely The Fog, but in Wisconsin, in the winter".
