= The Alpha Incident =

1978 film

- Theatrical release poster
- Directed by: Bill Rebane
- Written by: Ingrid Neumayer (original screenplay)
- Produced by: Herbert L. Cohan (associate producer); Michael D. Graves (executive producer); Woody Jarvis (associate producer); Barbara J. Rebane (executive producer); Bill Rebane (producer)
- Starring: Ralph Meeker; Stafford Morgan; John F. Goff; Carol Irene Newell; George "Buck" Flower; Paul Bentzen
- Cinematography: Bela St. Jon
- Edited by: Bill Rebane
- Music by: Richard A. Girvin
- Production company: Studio Film Corporation
- Distributed by: Studio Film Corporation
- Release date: May 24, 1978 (Mandan, North Dakota)
- Running time: 95 minutes
- Country: United States
- Language: English

The Alpha Incident (also known as The Alien Incident, and Gift from a Red Planet) is a 1978 American science fiction horror film directed by Bill Rebane and starring Ralph Meeker, Stafford Morgan, John F. Goff, Carol Irene Newell, and George "Buck" Flower.

== Premise ==
A space probe returns to Earth from Mars, carrying with it a deadly organism which has the lethal potential to destroy all life on Earth. While being transported across country by train, the microorganism is released when a nosy train employee inspects the cargo. This results in an entire train station being quarantined along with government biologist Dr. Sorenson.

Those who are trapped wait for other government scientists to find a cure while trying not to fall asleep; sleep triggers the microorganism, and that is when the virus strikes. While asleep, the disease causes the brain to swell to the point that the skull is fractured.

Although a cure is found, government agents begin killing those who survived the disease as part of a cover up.

== Cast ==
- Ralph Meeker as Charlie
- Stafford Morgan as Dr. Sorensen
- John F. Goff as Jack Tiller
- Carol Irene Newell as Jenny
- George "Buck" Flower as Hank (credited as Buck Flower)
- Paul Bentzen as Dr. Farrell
- John Alderman as Dr. Rogers
- Ray Szmanda as The Official
- Lawrence Ripp as The Guard
- Harry Youstos as Alvin

== Release ==
The Alpha Incident was released for the first time on DVD by Mill Creek Entertainment on August 30, 2005 as a part of its Chilling Classics: 50 Movie Pack. On August 15, 2006 it was released by Digital 1 Stop, as a part of its Nightmare Worlds: 50 Movie Pack. Mill Creek re-released the film on four separate occasions as a part of various multi-film packs in 2007 and 2008. On August 24, 2010, the film was released as a part of a multi-film pack by Tnt Media Group. On September 21, that same year it was released as a single-feature by Synergy Entertainment.

As of November 2021, the full movie is available on YouTube.

== Reception ==
The Alpha Incident received mostly negative reviews upon its release. Alan Jones from Radio Times rated the film a negative one out of five stars, calling it "[an] over-talky feeble fable". Dan Budnik from Bleeding Skull also criticized the film as being "overly talky", while also criticizing the film's underwritten and unlikable characters and sluggish pacing. On his website Fantastic Movie Musings and Ramblings, Dave Sindelar similarly criticized the film's unlikable characters, with character interactions being "repetitious and tiresome". Sindelar also criticized the film's poor acting and dialogue.

Creature Feature gave the movie one star, citing many of the same issues in the above review and noting that Ralph Meeker is wasted in the movie and his death scene the only interesting part of the film. The Encyclopedia of Science Fiction noted that director Rebane is known for his low budget movies, and this is neither his best nor his worst.
