= Twister's Revenge! =

- VHS cover
- Directed by: Bill Rebane
- Written by: William Arthur; Larry Dreyfus; Bill Rebane
- Produced by: Bill Rebane; Larry Dreyfus
- Starring: Dean West; Meredith Orr; Jonathan Goch; R. Richardson Luka; Jay Gjernes
- Cinematography: Bill Rebane
- Edited by: William Arthur; Bill Rebane
- Music by: M. Hans Liebert
- Production company: MTP Productions
- Distributed by: Focus Film (West Germany); Mill Creek Entertainment
- Release date: 1988
- Running time: 90 minutes
- Country: United States
- Language: English
- Budget: $95,000

Twister's Revenge! is a 1988 American action comedy film directed by Bill Rebane and released direct-to-video.

== Plot ==
Three bumbling criminals have repeatedly tried to steal the computerized control system of Mr. Twister, a talking monster truck with a mind of its own. They make one last attempt with an M60 tank.

== Cast ==
- Dean West as Dave
- Meredith Orr as Sherry
- David Alan Smith as Kelly
- R. Richardson Luka as Bear
- Jay Gjernes as Dutch
- Tena Murray as Lulu
- William Dexter as Kelly's Father (credited as Bill Dexter)
- J. Worthington Kratz as Kelly's Mother
- Elizabeth Gray as Love Bird Singer
- Angailica as Love Bird Dancer (credited as Angel Rebane)

Featured Monster Truck show in Ionia, Michigan featured the following drivers as themselves:

- Rob Fuchs, driving First Blood
- Mark Bendler, driving Kodiak
- Jim Miller, driving Barbarian
- Allen Pezo, driving Lone Eagle

== Production ==
Twister's Revenge! was filmed in Merrill, Wisconsin at a cost of $95,000. Rebane said that "We had a strong lead actor [Dean West] for "Twister's Revenge" but the girl — the lead actress — [Meredith Orr] was very weak."

Mr. Twister was a custom-made monster truck belonging to a local man, David Staszak. Its computer control system included an AT&T PC 6300.

== Release ==
Twister's Revenge! was released on VHS by Video First Entertainment of Chippewa Falls, Wisconsin in 1988. It was also released in West Germany, under the title Ein Supertruck auf Gangsterjagd! ("A Supertruck on a Gangster-Hunt!") and in Japan.

It was rereleased by Mill Creek Entertainment in 2006, as part of their "Drive-in Movie Classics" series.

=== Reviews ===
1000 Misspent Hours and Counting awarded the film 2½ stars, noting that Mr. Twister's onboard AI was clearly a ripoff of Knight Rider's KITT and saying that the film had a "demented mismatch between tone and subject matter. The very idea of a funny vigilante revenge film is bizarre. I hasten to emphasize that Twister’s Revenge! is not a parody of Death Wish wannabes, but rather a Death Wish wannabe that is also a comedy."

Josiah Chiappelli gave the film 3/5 on his "Hipster Holy Grail" series.
