= Invasion from Inner Earth =

- Directed by: Bill Rebane
- Written by: Barbara J. Rebane
- Produced by: Bill Rebane
- Starring: Paul Bentzen; Debbi Pick
- Cinematography: Jack Willoughby
- Edited by: Peter Harlos; Bill Rebane
- Release date: 1974
- Running time: 94 minutes
- Country: United States
- Language: English

Invasion from Inner Earth (also known as They and Hell Fire) is a 1974 American apocalyptic science fiction film starring Paul Bentzen and Debbi Pick, and directed by Bill Rebane. The film "made money" and allowed Rebane to make his subsequent films.

== Plot ==
A group of pilots in the Canadian wilderness begin to hear strange reports over their radios about planes crashing, cars stalling, and a deadly plague which has gripped the planet. As the plot continues, it's clear that Earth is in the midst of an invasion. The pilots barricade themselves in a cabin in the woods and wait for impending doom.

== Cast ==
- Paul Bentzen as Stan
- Debbi Pick as Sarah
- Nick Holt as Jake
- Karl Wallace as Eric
- Robert Arkens as Andy
- Arnold Didrickson as Sam
- James Steadman as Radio Announcer
- David Pray as T.V. Host
- Mary O'Keefe as Mrs. Murphy

== Home media ==
A DVD-version exists, published in 2021 as part of DVD collection of the director's films.

== Reception ==
Creature Feature gave the film one star, calling it lumbering, the special effects awful, and the ending incomprehensible, Fantastic Movie Musings found it almost completely devoid of entertainment value featuring an ending that shows a 20-minute walk. "f the worst sin a movie can make is to be boring, then Invasion from Inner Earth dooms itself for all eternity. Egregious scenes of nothingness never build tension or pacing. Dialog goes nowhere. Characters bring nothing of interest. Stiff performances lack any convincing qualities. Then comes a brief dance number worthy of the schlock cinema hall of fame.", wrote a review of the DVD.
