= Monster a Go-Go =

1965 film by Herschell Gordon Lewis

Monster a Go-Go!
- Original theatrical release poster
- Directed by: Bill Rebane; Uncredited: Herschell Gordon Lewis
- Written by: Sheldon Seymour
- Story by: Bill Rebane; Jeff Smith; Dok Stanford; Herschell Gordon Lewis
- Produced by: Henry Marsh; Bill Rebane; Sheldon S. Seymour
- Starring: Henry Hite
- Narrated by: Herschell Gordon Lewis (uncredited); Bill Rebane (uncredited)
- Cinematography: Frank Pfeiffer
- Production companies: B.I. & L. Releasing Corp.
- Distributed by: B.I. & L. Releasing Corp.
- Release date: July 1965
- Running time: 69 minutes
- Country: United States
- Language: English

Monster a Go-Go! is a 1965 American horror film directed by Bill Rebane and Herschell Gordon Lewis (who remained uncredited in association with this film). The film is considered to be one of the worst films ever made.

== Plot ==
American astronaut Frank Douglas was on a mission to identify satellites mysteriously not having been sent into orbit by any nation, but ground control lost contact with his space capsule (not shown).

Col. Steve Connors spearheads the search for Douglas's capsule after it is presumed to have parachuted back to Earth (not shown). Following up on a tip that a strange object had fallen to Earth near Chicago's Space Agency Astrophysical Laboratories, a helicopter patrol (unmarked) locates the nosecone of the capsule, but the pilot, Jim Taylor, mysteriously loses contact with Connors mid-sentence. Connors finds the capsule empty and the pilot far from the helicopter, dead and "horribly mangled in a way no one had ever seen before" (not shown).

Dr. Nora Kramer and Dr. Karl Schreiber visit Ruth Logan at home to update her that Frank Douglas is still missing. Ruth's concern is that, since her husband Harry Logan died, Frank had been like a father to their son (and Frank's nephew), Jimmy. In the middle of the meeting, Karl receives a phone call informing him that a body had been found. Ruth insists on accompanying Nora and Karl, only to learn on site that the body is Jim Taylor's, not Frank's. How Karl could know the capsule had landed but not know about the patrol pilot who had found it is left unexplained.

Dr. Frank Logan (brother of Dr. Tom Logan) shows Karl the corpse, which is described as "shriveled up like a dried prune" and "some kind of a burn" (not shown), in contrast to the body's prior description.

Back at SAAL, Dr. Frank Logan reveals to Col. Connors that Taylor died of radiation, and that the capsule couldn't have been the source. Logan concludes from this and the scorch marks that Schreiber dismissed as a prank that Douglas is still alive—a supposition Connors rejects.

Connors and Schreiber call in Dr. Chris Manning, the civilian head of the satellite investigation.

At an unrelated party, a jealous boyfriend drags off his girlfriend after she dances with another guy. He parks and they kiss to make up. She gets out of the car when he gets too aggressive. She turns around and witnesses Frank Douglas attack and kill her boyfriend (not shown). Manning matches the wounds to those of the helicopter pilot.

Dr. Frank Logan returns to the crash site with co-worker Henry Schwartz's Geiger counter to test his theory that a radioactive Frank Douglas killed the chopper pilot. He confirms his theory with his life.

Manning and Ruth Logan dine out, reminiscing over old times, but cut it short when they learn of Dr. Frank Logan's death. On site, Manning and Schreiber decide they must figure out why Frank Logan returned to the crash site to explain his death.

To that end, Connors introduces the military head of the project, Dr. Brent, to Dr. Nora Kramer, former assistant to Dr. Frank Logan and current assistant to Frank's brother Conrad. Kramer reveals Taylor's blood had fully desiccated. More significantly, a discrepancy in log books reveals that beginning six months ago, Douglas had received injections of anti-radiation treatment twice as effective as normal (Itinium 51 vs 50) and at twice the normal dosage. Results of overdose on pigs matched the characteristics of Monster Douglas—specifically, a lethal touch and doubling of size.

While synthesizing another batch of the antidote to Itinium 51 invented by Frank Logan, Kramer mentions there have been no monster attacks for three weeks. The narrator reveals this is because Dr. Conrad Logan has been keeping Monster Douglas in a storeroom, drugged with antidote and tranquilizer. Conrad is late in surreptitiously giving Douglas his evening injection due to Kramer's working late. While Conrad is absent to give Monster Douglas his injection, Monster Douglas surreptitiously escapes the storeroom, evades Conrad on the way to the lab, smashes the lab equipment, and steals all containers of the antidote (not shown), presumably for self-administration. The wreckage and theft force Conrad to 'fess up to Dr. Brent to his duplicity in hiding Monster Douglas (after three murders!)—to protect Douglas, so he claims. Dr. Brent must now 'fess up to Dr. Manning.

With the monster loose, attacks begin again. Monster Douglas returns to Ruth Logan's home, as the military had anticipated, but bullets do not stop him.

An odd scene seemingly unrelated to the plot is then interspliced. A truck driver rescues a flirtatious convertible driver out of gas. She repays him with a kiss. We later learn that Douglas boarded the back of the truck to get into Chicago (not shown)—the driver subsequently dying of radiation burns (also not shown).

Conrad decides Monster Douglas will soon run out of antidote, and so the public should be warned. Geiger counters become useless to spot Monster Douglas, as his radius of infection grows to be larger than the maximum distance of detection. Conrad and Connors bank on a blow dart with 3000 cc of antidote, to repeat the lethal shock to the system of returning to normal that an antidote overdose had had in animal studies.

Civil defense corners Monster Douglas in a Chicago sewer, but he suddenly disappears. Conrad simultaneously receives a telegram stating that Douglas is in fact alive and well, having been rescued 8,000 miles from Chicago in a lifeboat in the North Atlantic with no memory of the prior weeks, suggesting either that Monster Douglas was an alien impersonating Douglas or Monster Douglas had turned into normal Douglas in a sort of time slip.

== Cast ==
- Henry Hite as Frank Douglas / Monster Douglas
- June Travis as Ruth
- Jim Bassler as Jimmy
- Phil Morton as Colonel Steve Connors
- Peter M. Thompson as Dr. Chris Manning
- Herschell Gordon Lewis as radio announcer (uncredited)
- Bill Rebane as narrator

== Production ==
The film had an unusual production history. Bill Rebane knew the 7 ft 6¾ in (2.31 m) Henry Hite socially and was inspired to write a science fiction story featuring him. Production began in 1962 on Terror at Half Day, and filming in the Chicago metro area continued off and on into 1963 before being abandoned when Rebane ran out of funding. Already working with Herschell Gordon Lewis, Rebane turned the incomplete film over to Lewis and moved on to other projects.

Several years later, Lewis needed a second film to show with his own feature, Moonshine Mountain. To Terror Lewis added a few extra scenes, included some new dialogue, and then released it, creating an odd, disjointed story with little continuity. Lewis did not finish the film—ultimately re-titled Monster A-Go-Go—until 1965, so he was unable to gather all of the original cast, resulting in almost half the characters disappearing midway through the film to be replaced by other characters who fill most of the same roles. One of the actors Lewis was able to rehire had dramatically changed his look in the intervening years, necessitating his playing the brother of the original character. At one point, when a phone supposedly rings, the sound effect is obviously a person making a noise with his mouth.

== Release and reception ==
Critical reception has been predominantly negative, with the film regarded as being one of the all-time worst.

Allmovie gave the film a negative review, calling it "an incoherent concoction brewed solely to fill space on a double bill" while TV Guide panned the film, calling it "garbage".

Dennis Schwartz from Ozus' World Movie Reviews gave the film a negative review. In his review of the film, Schwartz called it "One of the most incoherent films ever made because the plot line can't be explained rationally nor are the characters clearly defined." When reviewing the film, Horror News.net also noted the reason behind its negative reputation: "The film itself falls into the 'worst' category with not only a lethargic presentation but with its odd-pieced editing style. Some scenes pop in out of nowhere that really don't seem to have much to do with the previous scene. Others are typical conversation scenes that are just edited back and forth in a haphazard way. I think the film stands better as a piece to be mocked and laughed at than as a real piece of important cinema. In fact, you may find humor in just those elements alone that make the experience one to look for mistakes, continuity errors and ridiculous logic at times. Why they felt the need that it needed some hipster dance scenes thrown in to sell more tickets is beyond me. But the result is so odd that it also deserves a laugh. It's classic B-grade miss mash that only has appeal in its disjointed effort."

=== Home media ===
Monster a Go-Go! was released with Psyched by the 4-D Witch as a DVD double feature in 2002 by Something Weird Video.

In October 2010, Synergy Entertainment released a "Special Collector's Edition" DVD on its CULTRA imprint. Extras included audio commentary by Rabane and cult film hostorian Joe Rubin, a video interview with Rabane, and booklet with an article about the film's production reprinted from Scary Monsters magazine.

Monster a Go-Go! was included in Weird Wisconsin: The Bill Rebane Collection, a limited edition, four Blu-Ray box set issued by Arrow Films in May 2021. It used a new scan from "the best available materials," namely a 16mm print with a full 1.37:1 aspect ratio and mono sound scanned in 2K resolution at Company 3, then graded and restored at R3Store Studios in London. The disc's extras included a newly filmed interview with Rabane about the making of the movie.

==== Mystery Science Theater 3000 ====
The film was featured in episode #421 of the satirical film-riffing television series Mystery Science Theater 3000, airing for the first time on Comedy Central on January 9, 1993, alongside the short Circus on Ice. Writer Paul Chaplin called Monster a Go-Go "officially the worst movie" the show had featured, as of Season 7. The movie's lack of focus also forced the writers for the first time to explicitly decide not to have any of the episode's host segments have anything to do with the movie.

Writer Jim Vorel ranked the episode #119 (out of 197 total MST3K episodes) in his ranking of episodes from the series's first 12 seasons. Vorel agrees with those who call Monster a Go-Go "one of the worst films ever made." The quality of the episode, Vorel argues, is dragged down by the "overwhelming pain" of the movie, calling it "pieced-together dreck" with a "horrendous audio track."

The MST3K version of the film was released by Rhino Home Video as part of the Mystery Science Theater 3000 Collection, vol. 8 DVD set. It was re-released by Shout Factory on November 15, 2018. The other episodes in the four-disc set include Hobgoblins (episode #907), The Phantom Planet (episode #902), and The Dead Talk Back (episode #603).

== See also ==
- List of 20th century films considered the worst
