= Maiden Belmuthi =

Maiden Belmuthi (Assamese: বেলমুঠি গাভৰু, Belmuthi Gabhoru or Belmuthi Gabharu; Bodo: বেলমুঠি ছিখ্‌ল৷ Bēlamuṭhi chikh‌la or Belmuthi Sikhla) is a folktale from the Boro or Bodo people. The tale is a local form of tale type ATU 408, "The Love for Three Oranges", of the international Aarne-Thompson-Uther Index. As with The Three Oranges, the tale deals with a prince's search for a supernatural bride that comes from a magic box, who is replaced by a false bride and goes through a cycle of incarnations, until she regains physical form again.

== Summary ==
In this tale, sourced from Baksa District, a king has seven sons, six already married, save the youngest. One day, the cadet dislikes the food (or curry) prepared by his sisters-in-law, and they reply he should seek and marry a girl named Belmuthi Gabharu, who can cook for him. The prince decides to seek this Belmuthi Gabharu and begins a journey. On the road, he meets a Holy Person that directs him to a river where Belmuthi Gabharu comes to bathe and arrives in a golden box. The prince goes to the riverbank, digs up a hole and waits for Belmuthi to appear: she comes in a palanquin and accompanied by maidens from the heavens to bathe in the river. The maidens bathe in another part of the river, while Belmuthi bathes in another area, then enters her golden box. The prince snatches the box and is chased by hordes of people from Heaven. He quickly enters the hut of another Holy Person, who turns him into a cat to trick the pursuers. After the maidens leave, the second Holy Person trades Belmuthi's golden box for a magical cane that strikes people, which the prince uses on the Holy Person and retrieves the box. Next, he meets a third Holy Person and makes a trade: the box for a sack that produces whatever its owner desires, and absconds with the sack.

On reaching his hometown, he decides to open Belmuthi's box to release her, but a flash of lightning strikes him and he faints. Belmuthi Gabharu comes out of the box and goes to a nearby well to draw some water to revive the prince. However, a demon's daughter shoves her down the well, takes her form and goes to revive the prince herself by sprinkling water on him. The prince wakes up, sees the false Belmuthi, and takes her to his palace. Some time later, during a journey through the countryside, he goes to drink water from a well and finds a flower inside that only he can pluck. He takes the flower and brings it home with him. The false Belmuthi takes the flower and stamps on it; on its place, a bel tree sprouts, which the false Belmuthi cuts in pieces. A washerwoman finds a bel fruit from the tree and brings home with her, from which comes forth a girl she adopts.

The prince meets the girl reproaching him from her house, and orders some soldiers to execute her, unaware that she is Belmuthi Gabhoru's incarnation. The soldiers take the girl to the forest, kill her, and cut her to pieces, then their daggers dig up a hole in the ground. Water fills up the hole and creates a pond, while droplets from the girl's blood fall in the water and create lotus flowers. One day, the prince goes on a hunt and passes by the pond, then goes to drink from it, when a voice comes from the flowers, saying that a pair of matured vultures are perched on nearby trees, which he can ask to recount a tale. The prince does as the voice instructed, and the vultures retell the entire tale of Belmuthi Ghaboru's, up to the creation of the pond. The prince then gathers the lotus flowers from the water to the riverbank, and they reform into the true Belmuthi Gabhoru. The prince kills the demoness wife and marries the true Belmuthi Gabhoru.

== Analysis ==
=== Tale type ===
The tale is classified in the international Aarne-Thompson-Uther Index as tale type ATU 408, "The Three Oranges". In the Indian variants, the protagonist goes in search of the fairy princess on his sisters-in-law's mocking, finds her and brings her home, but an ugly woman of low social standing kills and replaces her. The fairy princess, then, goes through a cycle of transformations until she regains physical form.

In an article in Enzyklopädie des Märchens, scholar Christine Shojaei Kawan separated the tale type into six sections, and stated that parts 3 to 5 represented the "core" of the story:

1. A prince is cursed by an old woman to seek the fruit princess;
2. The prince finds helpers that guide him to the princess's location;
3. The prince finds the fruits (usually three), releases the maidens inside, but only the third survives;
4. The prince leaves the princess up a tree near a spring or stream, and a slave or servant sees the princess's reflection in the water;
5. The slave or servant replaces the princess (transformation sequence);
6. The fruit princess and the prince reunite, and the false bride is punished.

=== Motifs ===
==== The maiden's appearance ====
According to the tale description in the international index, the maiden may appear out of the titular citrus fruits, like oranges and lemons. However, she may also come out of pomegranates or other species of fruits, and even eggs. In Stith Thompson and Jonas Balys's Oral Tales of India, this motif is indexed as "D211. Transformation: man to fruit".

==== The transformations and the false bride ====
The tale type is characterized by the substitution of the fairy wife for a false bride. The usual occurrence is when the false bride (a witch or a slave) sticks a magical pin into the maiden's head or hair and she becomes a dove. (Note: "The motif of a woman stabbed in her head with a pin occurs in AT 403 (in India) and in AT 408 (in the Middle East and southern Europe).") Christine Shojaei-Kawan notes that variants of Indian tradition lack the motif of the false bride mistaking the fruit maiden's reflection in the well for her own. Instead, generally in these tales the hero faints and the fruit princess goes to fetch water to awake him, when a girl of lower caste notices the fruit princess and trades clothes with her, then drowns her in water.

In other variants, the maiden goes through a series of transformations after her liberation from the fruit and regains a physical body. (Note: As Hungarian-American scholar Linda Dégh put it, "(...) the Orange Maiden (AaTh 408) becomes a princess. She is killed repeatedly by the substitute wife's mother, but returns as a tree, a pot cover, a rosemary, or a dove, from which shape she seven times regains her human shape, as beautiful as she ever was".) In that regard, according to Christine Shojaei-Kawan's article, Christine Goldberg divided the tale type into two forms. In the first subtype, indexed as AaTh 408A, the fruit maiden suffers the cycle of metamorphosis (fish-tree-human) - a motif Goldberg locates "from the Middle East to Italy and France". In the second subtype, AaTh 408B, the girl is transformed into a dove by the needle. In this light, researcher Noriko Mayeda and Indologist W. Norman Brown noted that the fruit maiden "generally" goes from human to flower, then to tree, to fruit again, and finally regains human form.

In addition, in Indian variants, after a cycle of transformations into a flower and a tree, the false wife orders the fruit maiden's execution. The fruit maiden's body parts then form a palace for her to dwell and two birds that repeat her story to the prince.

== See also ==
- The Belbati Princess
- The Coconut Lady (Indian folktale)
- The Story of a Fairy and a Prince (Shan folktale)
- The Princess from the Fruit
- The Pomegranate Fairy (Indian folktale)
