= Leslie Milne =

Leslie Milne may refer to:

- Leslie Milne (field hockey) (born 1956), former field hockey player from the United States
- Mrs. Leslie Milne (1860–1932), English anthropologist
