= The Pomegranate Fairy =

Indian folktale collected by Alice Elizabeth Dracott

The Anar Pari, or Pomegranate Fairy is an Indian folktale collected by Alice Elizabeth Dracott from Simla. The tale is a local form of tale type ATU 408, "The Love for Three Oranges", of the international Aarne-Thompson-Uther Index. As with The Three Oranges, the tale deals with a prince's search for a bride that lives in a fruit (a pomegranate), who is replaced by a false bride and goes through a cycle of incarnations, until she regains physical form again. Variants are known across India with other species of fruits.

== Summary ==
A king has seven sons, six of which are already married. One day, the queen asks her youngest son what is the matter that he is still single, and suggests he finds himself for his wife the Anar Pari, the most beautiful of fairies.

The prince decides to search for this Anar Pari himself, and journeys until he meets a fakir. The holy man promises to turn him into a parrot, so he can fly to a perilous island where the maiden is located, inside a fruit from a pomegranate tree guarded by dragons. The prince is to reach the tree and pluck the middle one from the tree fruits, and fly back without looking behind him, otherwise his efforts will have been for naught.

The prince, in parrot form, flies to the island in the seventh sea, with the garden and the tree in it. He fetches the fruit and makes a turn back to the fakir, but a dragon begins to chase him. Forgetting the fakir's words, he turns behind him and the dragon burns his body to cinder, then retrieves the fruit.

Noticing the prince's delay, the fakir makes himself invisible and goes to the island, where he finds the parrot's remains. He resurrects the prince and advises him again, so that he does not fail this time. The prince tries to steal the fruit one more time, and manages to do it the second time. He flies back to the fakir's hut, where the man turns him into a fly. The dragons make chase and reach the same hut, where they inquire about the parrot and the fruit. Finding nothing, the dragons depart. Safe now, the fakir restores the prince to human shape, advises him to return to his kingdom and open the pomegranate to release the fairy maiden, bidding him good luck.

Back to his kingdom, the prince decides to open the fruit, and a beautiful maiden comes out of it, of such beauty the youth swoons. The fairy maiden rests the prince's head on her lap, waiting for him to come to. Meanwhile, a low caste woman appears to draw water and finds the pair, asking the fairy about the asleep youth and herself.

The fairy confirms she is the Anar Pari and the youth is the prince of this kingdom, spurring the woman's envy. She convinces the fairy to trade clothes with her and for them to see their reflections in the water. The fairy does as asked and is shoved into a well, while the low caste woman takes place. The prince finally wakes up and, finding the woman and not the fairy, takes her to the palace, despite some initial suspicions.

The prince marries the false princess, who fears she might be discovered if he comes to the well. And so he does: he finds a white lotus flower, which no one but him is able to grab. He brings the flower home. The false princess tears it to pieces and throws it in the garden, where a bed of mint sprouts. A cook takes some mint to use in a meal, and the mint begins to wail about the false princess. Scared, the cook throws the mint away, where a creeper springs and grows under the prince's window. The false princess orders the creeper to the destroyed, but a fruit survives and rolls down a jessamine bush.

The gardener's daughter brings the fruit home. The fairy maiden springs out of the fruit and lives with the gardener's family. One day, the gardener's daughter weaves a garland of flowers, and so does the Anar Pari, who she tells the girl to deliver to the prince. The prince notices that the garland is of exquisite quality and suspects the fairy maiden is still alive.

Back to the false princess, fearing for her life, she feigns illness and asks the prince to procure the heart of a beautiful girl as remedy, specially the one that lives in the gardener's hut. The Anar Pari is once again targeted for execution, and asks that, after her death, her members are to be thrown to the four winds and her eyes cast to space. It happens thus, and her eyes become a pair of lovebirds that settle in the forest.

Some time later, the prince goes to the forest to hunt and listens to the birds talking about the Anar Pari's story, and the false bride by the prince's side. The prince begs the princess to come back to him, and the eyes are restored back to the human form of the Anar Pari, beautiful as always. The prince and the fairy maiden marry and punish the false bride. The gardener's family is also visited by the Anar Pari, and she and the gardener's daughter weave flower garlands together.

== Analysis ==
=== Tale type ===
The tale is classified in the international Aarne-Thompson-Uther Index as tale type ATU 408, "The Three Oranges". In the Indian variants, the protagonist goes in search of the fairy princess on his sisters-in-law's mocking, finds her and brings her home, but an ugly woman of low social standing kills and replaces her. The fairy princess, then, goes through a cycle of transformations until she regains physical form.

In an article in Enzyklopädie des Märchens, scholar Christine Shojaei Kawan separated the tale type into six sections, and stated that parts 3 to 5 represented the "core" of the story:

- (1) A prince is cursed by an old woman to seek the fruit princess;
- (2) The prince finds helpers that guide him to the princess's location;
- (3) The prince finds the fruits (usually three), releases the maidens inside, but only the third survives;
- (4) The prince leaves the princess up a tree near a spring or stream, and a slave or servant sees the princess's reflection in the water;
- (5) The slave or servant replaces the princess (transformation sequence);
- (6) The fruit princess and the prince reunite, and the false bride is punished.

=== Motifs ===
==== The maiden's appearance ====
According to the tale description in the international index, the maiden may appear out of the titular citrus fruits, like oranges and lemons. However, she may also come out of pomegranates or other species of fruits, and even eggs. In Stith Thompson and Jonas Balys's Oral Tales of India, this motif is indexed as "D211. Transformation: man to fruit". More specific motifs to the story include "D431.6.1.2. Woman emerges from fruit" and "T543.3. Birth from fruit".

==== The transformations and the false bride ====
The tale type is characterized by the substitution of the fairy wife for a false bride. The usual occurrence is when the false bride (a witch or a slave) sticks a magical pin into the maiden's head or hair and she becomes a dove. (Note: "The motif of a woman stabbed in her head with a pin occurs in AT 403 (in India) and in AT 408 (in the Middle East and southern Europe).") Christine Shojaei-Kawan notes that variants of Indian tradition lack the motif of the false bride mistaking the fruit maiden's reflection in the well for her own. Instead, generally in these tales the hero faints and the fruit princess goes to fetch water to awake him, when a girl of lower caste notices the fruit princess and trades clothes with her, then drowns her in water.

In other variants, the maiden goes through a series of transformations after her liberation from the fruit and regains a physical body. (Note: As Hungarian-American scholar Linda Dégh put it, "(...) the Orange Maiden (AaTh 408) becomes a princess. She is killed repeatedly by the substitute wife's mother, but returns as a tree, a pot cover, a rosemary, or a dove, from which shape she seven times regains her human shape, as beautiful as she ever was".) In that regard, according to Christine Shojaei-Kawan's article, Christine Goldberg divided the tale type into two forms. In the first subtype, indexed as AaTh 408A, the fruit maiden suffers the cycle of metamorphosis (fish-tree-human) - a motif Goldberg locates "from the Middle East to Italy and France". In the second subtype, AaTh 408B, the girl is transformed into a dove by the needle. In this light, researcher Noriko Mayeda and Indologist W. Norman Brown noted that the fruit maiden "generally" goes from human to flower, then to tree, to fruit again, and finally regains human form.

== Variants ==
=== India ===
While organizing the Indic index, Stith Thompson and Warren Roberts noted the close proximity between types 403, "The Black and the White Bride", and 408, "The Three Oranges" - types that deal with the theme of the "Substituted Bride". To better differentiate between them, both scholars remarked that the heroine must be replaced by a female antagonist that is unrelated to her. Thompson's second revision of the international type index listed 17 variants of tale type 408 in India and South Asia. In some of the Indian tales, the heroine does not come out of a fruit, but she is still replaced by the false bride and goes through a cycle of transformations. Despite this, these stories are indexed as the same tale type.

Examples of stories that lack the heroine's birth from the fruit, but keep the cycle of transformations, include Indian tales Phúlmati Rání, The Apple Princess and Raní Jhajhaní (or Rani Jajhani), and Sri Lankan The Maehiyallē-gama Princess. Other tales of the same narrative encompass Sema Naga stories Muchüpile and Tseipu and Kawulipu, Lhota Naga Hunchibili, (Note: In a footnote, Hutton stated that the tale Hunchibili was from the Lhotas, but versions of it existed among the Angami Nagas and the Semas.) Zeme Kirumbe, Mizo story Tumchhingi leh Raldawna ("The Story of Tumchhingi & Raldawna" or "Raldawana and Tumchingi"), Thadou Kuki Ashijoul or Ahsijolneng, Lushai The Story of Tlumtea and his Brothers (Note: The tale is also called Vanchungnula or Vanchungnula (The maiden of heaven).) and Khasi A Tale of the Takalong Cucumber.

==== Rupsinh and the Queen of the Anardes ====
Charles Augustus Kincaid published a tale from Gujarat with the name Rupsinh and the Queen of the Anardes. In this tale, prince Rupsinh loses his parents and his elder brother when he is only a child. His widowed sister-in-law mentions the Queen of the Anardes, which sparks an idea in the young prince: he will journey far and wide to find this Queen. After a long journey, including a stop at the kingdom of Princess Phulpancha, he reaches the kingdom of the Anardes. He learns the Queen and her handmaidens come out of the pomegranates in a garden, dance and return to the fruits. He takes the pomegranate with the queen and brings it to his kingdom. They marry, but a sweeper named Rukhi, "skilled in black magic", disposes of her and takes her place. The Queen of the Anardes becomes a lotus flower, then a mango tree, and reincarnates as the daughter of a banai couple.

==== Princess Pomegranate ====
In a variant from Mirzapur, collected from a teller named Karam-ud-din Ahmad and published by William Crooke with the title Princess Pomegranate (Anar Shahzadi), a king has four sons, three already married and the youngest still single. His sisters-in-law mock him by saying he intends to marry Anar Shahzadi (Princess Pomegranate). Piqued by curiosity, he learns this princess lives in a pomegranate in a garden guarded by lakhs of deos (demons). The prince meets a Deo, who directs him to another Deo, who helps him in his quest: the creature promises to turn him into a crow, so he can fly over the garden and steal the fruit, but warns him about not listening to its Deoni (demoness) guardian. In crow form, the prince steals the pomegranate, but the Deoni tricks him and kills him. The Deo helper finds the dead prince, revives him and transforms him into a parrot, so the youth can try again. On the second try, the prince is successful, and the Deoni chases after him to the Deo's house. To protect the prince, the Deo turns the parrot into a fly and fools the Deoni. Soon after, the prince departs back to his kingdom, and a lovely princess comes out of the pomegranate.

A mehtaráni (sweeper woman) tricks her into trading jewels and throws her in a well, then passes herself as the true princess. She is brought to the palace, but the prince's sisters-in-law do not recognize her as the Pomegranate Princess. As for the real one, she becomes a lotus flower in the well, which only the prince can take. The false princess rips its petals apart; where they fall, a pomegranate tree with blooms sprouts on its place, which the false princess orders to be uprooted. A flower is left which is given to the gardener's wife (málin). The real princess comes out of another pomegranate and adopted by the málin. One day, the prince sights the gardener's wife daughter, unaware of her being the true princess, and wants to marry her. However, the false princess feigns illness and asks for the girl's liver as cure. After an initial reluctance on the málin's part, she surrenders her daughter to be killed. However, "by the will of the Almighty", a house appears with the princess inside, guarded by two peacocks. The prince passes by the house, meets the princess and asks for her forgiveness. The pair reconciles and the prince brings Princess Pomegranate home, whom his sisters-in-law confirm to be real one. The sweeper woman is executed.

==== Anarzadi ====
In a Hindi language tale from Braj, Uttar Pradesh, titled अनारजादी ("Anarzadi"), translated to Russian with the title "Анарзади" ("Anarzadi"), a king has four sons. After he dies, the elder prince assumes the throne and looks after his younger siblings, to his wife's jealousy. One day, the elder brother's wife mockingly tells the youngest prince to search for Anarzadi, the girl from the pomegranate. Moved by her words, he decides to take up a quest to find her and return with the maiden as his wife. His first stop is with a sadhu, a wise man, who welcomes him in his abode and promises to help him find the Anarzadi. The prince gets a set of keys from the sadhu and opens every door in the sadhu's home: inside the last door, he finds human skeletons that begin to mock the boy, since they were also youths in search of Anarzadi and have fallen prey to the false sadhu. However, the skeletons also advise the prince to approach an oven in the back of the sadhu's home and, pretending not to know how to heat it up, convinces the sadhu to teach him, then shove the monster inside it.

The prince follows the skeletons' words and throws the false sadhu in the oven, burning him. He then journeys on until he meets a real sadhu, who is relieved that the boy survived the false sadhu, who was a Rakshasa. The real sadhu promises to help the prince, and gives him advice to find the Anarzadi: he is to go to a garden, pluck a flower from the pomegranate tree and flee; there will be a peri taking a bath nearby in a pond who will call him, but he is to pay no heed to her. The prince does as instructed, but the peri calls for him and he dies on the spot. Ten days later, the real sadhu suspects something must have happened to the prince, and finds him in the garden. He revives the youth and advises him again, but warns him to go straight home and not rest for anything. The prince, the second time, steals the pomegranate flower and hides it in his chest, then goes back home. Suddenly, he feels thirsty and drinks some water from a well, then lies down to rest under a tree. The flower falls from his chest to the ground and turns into a human girl, Anarzadi. Anarzadi walks around a bit and finds a Chamar girl near a well, then asks her to fetch some water. The Chamar girl says the nobles drink from that well and she cannot fetch any. Anarzadi goes to fetch water herself, when the Chamar girl rips out her jewels and dress, then shoves her down the water. The Chamar then waits for the prince to wake up and introduces herself as Anarzadi. The prince takes the false Anarzadi with him, while the true one becomes a rose in the well. Some time later, the prince goes to fetch water and try to get the flower, but only the prince grabs it and places it on his head.

The false bride notices the flower and, realizing it is the true maiden, pretends to be ill and asks for the rose, then crushes it in the garden. From the petals, a pomegranate tree sprouts, which the false bride want to be chopped down. A flower survives which the prince hides in the stables, where it turns into the real Anarzadi. The prince marries her. The Chamar girl, then, kills some horses in the stables, brushes the blood on Anarzadi's lips and points her as a witch. The prince falls for the trick and orders her execution: she is quartered in the forest, but a pomegranate tree sprouts from her blood. Some time later, a poor Brahmin's son cuts down the tree and releases Anarzadi, who declares she will live with the Brahmin's son as his sister, and weave beautiful kerchiefs for him to sell. The Brahmin's son sells the kerchief to the palace and the prince wishes to see their maker. The poor boy brings the prince to his hut and he meets Anarzadi, who tells him the whole story. The prince discovers he has been deceived by the Chamar girl and begs for Anarzadi's forgiveness. Anarzadi forgives him, but first he is to execute and bury the false bride in the palace. It is done so and the prince takes Anarzadi as his true wife to the palace. The tale was also republished to German from the original language by German Indologist Margot Gatzlaff-Hälsig with the title Das Granatapfelmädchen ("The Pomegranate Girl"). According to Gatzlaff-Hälsig's notes, the name of the antagonist ("Tschamār", in her translation) refers to a caste of professionals who work in leather tanning and shoemaking.

==== The Magic Tree ====
Ethnologist Verrier Elwin collected a tale from the Baiga with the title The Magic Tree, which he compared to the Ho tale of The Belbati Princess. In this tale, the youngest of five Baiga brothers leaves home to search for a bride for himself, since his four elder brothers are already married. The youth traverses the jungle of Kajli-ban-pahar and meets a Dewar in his hut, to whom he explains the reason for his quest. The Dewar asks the boy to work for him for four days, and later tells him where he can find his bride: there is a garden where twenty-one sisters live, the youngest named Anarjodi, who is the most beautiful; the girl lives inside a fruit of the anar tree in the same garden, comes out of the fruit to bathe, then enters the fruit again. The Dewar advises the boy to hide behind the anar tree until nightfall, beat its trunk with a stick, and pluck her fruit which will fall. The youth tries to follow the Dewar's instructions in the first night, but he knocks down other fruits. The next night, he beats the tree trunk and Anarjodi's fruit falls to the ground, which he takes with him back to the Dewar's house, all the while being chased by the girl's twenty sisters. The girls stop before the Dewar's house, for fear of the man, and return to the garden. The Dewar then advises the youth to open the fruit only at home, and gives some ashes to summons his aid if the need be. The boy departs with the fruit, but, on the road, he begins to feel thirsty, and stops by a well. He then opens the fruit and Anarjodi comes out of it, so beautiful the boy faints. Anarjodi goes to fetch some water to revive him, and caresses his head on her lap. Suddenly, a bee steals a flower from Anarjodi's hair, in which resides her jiv, and tosses it in the well, causing the girl to disappear. The boy wakes up and, not finding the girl, summons the Dewar with the ashes and the fruit appears in his hand, which he brings home.

Later, the youth builds a house for himself, and opens the fruit again, and this time Anarjodi appears to him. Some time later, while the youth and his brothers are away, a one-eyed Chamarin girl enters his house, plucks the flower from Anarjodi's hair and places it in a fence, causing her to disappear, and takes her place. When the youth returns, he does not notice the difference, for "she was in every way like Anarjodi". His brothers decide to pay him a visit and recognize the false Anarjodi as the one-eyed Chamarin girl. The youth summons the Dewar again with the ashes, and the true Anarjodi appears to him, then they send the Chamarin girl to be executed. Later, a local king learns of Anarjodi's beauty and tries to marry her by force, but the youth uses the ashes on the king and his army to transform them into animals. Lastly, a Brahmin sadhu passes by the youth's house right in the moment where the couple are in the throes of passion, and curses them to die the next time they touch each other. It happens thus, and Anarjodi and the youth die in each other's arms. His brothers find the dead couple and bury them together.

==== Ainawati ====
In a Bengali language tale collected from a Patua source in Bharatpur, Murshidabad, with the title "আয়নাবতী" ("Ainawati"), king Naibabu has two sons, elder Amir and young Jamir. In time, Amir marries, Naibabu and his wife die, and Amir and his wife take care of the young prince. When Jamir cries, his sister-in-law promises to marry him to a maiden named Ainawati when he is older. Years pass, and one night Jamir has a dream about marrying Ainawati, and decides to search for her, despite his relatives' opposition. Jamir reaches a river margin, where he finds a meditating sage. The prince cooks him some rice food, but, since the sage does not know of Ainawati, Jamir is directed to other two sages. The third sage, a muni, knows of Ainawati: she lives inside a pomegranate, but comes out at night to dance with her pari (fairy) sisters, then returns to the fruit. Thus, in order to gain her, the muni advises the prince to steal the paris' garments when they are bathing and rush back to his house. Jamir goes to spy on the paris and fetches their garments, but he fails each time, as the paris steal back their clothes. After the second time, the paris hide their sister Ainawati inside the pomegranate ("ডালিম" 'dalim', in the original). As another course of action, the muni changes the prince into a bird so he can fly in right into the tree and fetch the fruit. The first time, the prince in bird form steals Ainawati's fruit, but the paris follow him, kill him and retrieve the fruit.

The muni revives the prince and bids him cease his quest, but he insists to try one last time. Thus, the sage turns the prince into a bird again, he flies to the tree and steals the fruit again, the paris following behind and taunting him. The prince returns to the sage, who quickly restores him to human form to trick the chasing paris. After the paris leave, the muni tells the prince to open the fruit only at home. On the road back, Ainawati keeps singing some verses from inside the fruit, and Jamir decides to open it on the spot: Ainawati appears in so dazzling a flash of light he faints. Not knowing what to do, Ainawati decides to hide inside a lotus flower inside a nearby pond. A cobbler's daughter passes by the prince, throws some water on his face and fans him. When he wakes up, Jamir mistakes the cobbler's daughter for Ainawati, and the girl takes advantage of the mistake. Jamir brings the cobbler's daughter back home, marries her, then moves out to a hut. One day, he goes to bathe in the pond and the lotus flower floats next to him. Jamir takes the lotus back home and places it on a balcony.

At night, Ainawati's voice comes out of the flower, singing a sad song about the false bride. The cobbler's daughter says she is the one singing, then throws the lotus in a ditch, where Ainawati still sings the song. Trying to get rid of her rival, the cobbler's daughter cooks the lotus flower, then pours down the boiling water in the garden. Defeated, Ainawati summons her sisters' help, and six fairies come down with a chariot to retrieve her. Jamir sees the chariot and tries to stop Ainawati from leaving. Ainawati requests her sisters to bring him inside the chariot, calls him a fool and says he married a false bride, then departs. Dismayed, Jamir returns to his house and tells the cobbler's daughter they need to dig a ditch and fill it with thorns to protect the house from robbers. After the cobbler's daughter does it, Jamir shoves her in and buries her alive. Ainawati comes down from the chariot to live with the prince.

==== The Pomegranate Princess (Punjab) ====
In a Punjabi tale collected by folklorist Sohinder Singh Wanjara Bedi with the title The Pomegranate Princess, a king sends a Brahmin to arrange brides for his seven sons, but they must be seven sisters. The Brahmin finds another Pandit on the road who is on the same mission for his monarch, and they agree to fulfill their respective missions. Six of the seven princes marry six princesses, save for the youngest son, prince Hira, who wishes to marry a maiden of his own choosing. His sisters-in-law decide to invite Hira for a meal in order to convince him to marry their cadette, but he is steadfast. The princesses mock him, saying he must be looking to marry the "Pomegranate Princess". Prince Hira then decides to search for this Pomegranate Princess and marry her, or die trying. He reaches an untended garden he takes care of, then sleeps under a pomegranate tree. An ascetic, who lives in a hut near the garden, alternating six months of meditation and six months of tending to the garden, ceases his trance and discovers the sleeping prince, waking him up. Prince Hira explains he looked after the garden and is looking for the Pomegranate Princess.

The ascetic thanks him and gives the prince a ball for him to throw and follow until he finds a pomegranate tree, from which he is to pluck the largest fruit, but only open it at home, otherwise he would faint. Prince Hira follows the ascetic's instructions, fetches the pomegranate and walks home. When he is near his palace, he stops by a garden and decides to cut open the fruit to see what is inside: a princess wearing green clothes emerges from the fruit and he faints. Meanwhile, a grain-parcher woman has come to draw water, finds the couple and recognizes the fainted youth as prince Hira, deducing the girl is the Pomegranate Princess. The grain-parcher woman convinces the Pomegranate Princess to take a walk around the garden, leaving Hira unattended. After a while, the Pomegranate Princess feels thirsty and goes to a well to drink some water. The grain-parcher woman convinces the princess to trade clothes with her and see their reflection in the water, then shoves her inside the well and takes her place besides Hira. The prince wakes up, mistakes the woman for the true princess and takes her to the palace, but his sisters-in-law recognize her as a simple grain-parcher woman. As for the true Pomegranate Princess, she becomes a flower in the well that no one can pluck from the water. The false princess asks the prince to take it and grind it into a paste for her. It happens thus, but the paste begins to cause even more pain, so she tosses it in the garden. Leaves of a kulfa sprout where the paste fell, and the false wife wants them boiled to cure her feigned stomachache. The parcher woman tries to cook the leaves, which begin to reveal her ruse, so she throws away the pan. This causes an entire garden to spring, with a pomegranate tree in the middle.

The parcher woman asks the garden to be removed from her sight, and Hira summons the people to fetch every flower and fruit. An old woman's son wants to join the populace, but she fears it is a ploy by the prince. Still, the boy goes to the garden, plucks the giant pomegranate and brings it home. He cuts open the fruit and out comes the true Pomegranate Princess, who wishes to be adopted by the family. The Pomegranate Princess embroiders some handkerchiefs she sends the boy to sell at the market, which impresses prince Hira so much he wishes to marry their creator. Thus, prince Hira marries the Pomegranate Princess, unaware of her identity. At night, she reveals everything to Hira, and he punishes the parcher woman by cutting off her nose and ears, placing her on a donkey for people to spit on her as she rides, and lastly by killing the impostor. Hira and the Pomegranate Princess reign until their deaths, and the princess retreats into the fruit after Hira dies.

==== Anar Deī Rani ====
In a Western Pahari tale titled "अनार देई रानी" ("Anar Deī Rani"), a king has three sons, the elder two married and the third still single. The youngest prince's elder sister-in-law prepares him his food, but when he complains about her mistakes, she mockingly tells him he should find "Anar Dei Rani" for bride. Thus, the prince departs on horse, intent on finding this girl. The prince meets a sadhu on the road, and tells him he is after the Anar Deī ("अनार देई रानी", in the original). The sadhu gives him a stick, advising him to beat only once. However, the prince beats the stick twice and is reduced to ashes. The sadhu revives the prince with some mantras, and this time he obeys the man's instructions. A pomegranate seed ("दाना", in the original) appears before him, which the sadhu advises him to open up next to a water source. The prince goes back home and stops by a well, where he opens up the seed and out emerges Anar Dei Rani.

Anar Dei Rani goes to drink water in the well, when she meets a one-eyed woman, who asks her to trade clothes with the pomegranate maiden (whom the story also calls Ghulab Rani at this point), then shoves Anar Dei Rani inside the well. Ghulab Rani turns into a rose flower ("गुलाब का फूल", in the original) which the one-eyed woman takes with her. The prince mistakes her for the Anar Dei Rani and brings her home on his horse. Later, when she is preparing to cook, the rose is left unattended in the garden and a fenugreek ("मेथी", in the original) sprouts where she left it. The false queen takes the vegetable and decides to cook it. However, a voice starts to come from inside the pan, calling the false queen "Kani Rani", threatening to expose her. Thus, the false queen throws away the vegetables in the fields. A mango tree grows up and yields fruits. A Brahmin boy plucks a mango and brings home with him. The boy's mother goes to cook the mango, when Anar Dei Rani comes out of the fruit. She tells her whole story to the Brahmin woman. The next day, she goes to talk to the prince, who recognizes her. They are then married.

==== Anar Pashazadi ====
In an Indian tale sourced from Rayalaseema, Andhra Pradesh, with the title "अनार पाशाजादी" ("Anar Pashazadi"), an old woman goes to draw water from the king's fountains when the young prince breaks her jugs. Angered, the old woman replies to the prince he should do the same to Anar Pashazadi, who lives beyond seven seas. The prince nurtures the idea for years and decides to search for this Anar Pashazadi when he is fifteen years old, despite his parents' protests. He reaches a forest when a heavy storm hits him. He sees a light in the distance and goes towards it: it belongs to an old man who is aware of the prince's quest for the Anar Pashazadi. The old man warns the prince the path is dangerous, and gives him a set of mantras for him to use. The prince walks off into the darkness when a fierce rakshasi approaches him, at whom the prince tosses the mantra to calm her down. The prince pretends to be the rakshasi's relative to gain her trust; the creature takes him in and gives him some enchanted rocks. At last, the prince reaches a garden full of pomegranate trees and milky streams. The prince falls asleep. At midnight, paris come out of the pomegranates to dance and make music, including Anar Pashazadi, then return to the fruits at the break of day. The prince wakes up and fetches Anar Pashazadi's fruit, then makes his way back to his parents' country. He stops to rest by a well, when the pomegranate falls to the ground and Anar Pashazadi emerges. The maiden places the prince's head on her lap, when a dark-skinned maidservant comes to draw water and recognizes the prince. The maidservant then trades clothes with Anar Pashazadi, tosses her inside the well and takes her place beside the prince. The prince wakes up, mistakes one for the other and takes the false bride home to marry, but still feels sad inside. As for the true Anar Pashazadi, she becomes a lotus flower in the well which the prince brings home. The false bride smashes it and throws it away; where the petals fall, a vegetable sprouts. The false bride tries to cook it, but the pan begins to talk to her and she throws it away; in its place a pomegranate tree springs up. The prince notices the new tree, waters it every day and rests beside it at night. One evening, a fruit falls from the tree, releasing the same Anar Pashazadi as before, whom the prince recognizes and takes home with him. Anar Pashazadi explains everything to the prince and his parents, and the prince decides to punish the maidservant. Thus, he lures the false bride to a trap: he digs up a pit and fills it with water, then covers its opening and has the maidservant sit on it. The maidservant sinks into the covering and falls into the well. The prince and Anar Pashazadi live in happiness. According to the collector, it was provided by an informant named Yas Zainab Zarina Tamiz. The tale is also "specially popular" among the Muslim community.

==== Kumari Anarmati ====
In an Indian tale from Bundelkhand with the title "कुमारी अनारमती" ("Kumari Anarmati"), a king and queen have four sons, the elder three already married and the youngest still single. The cadet prince dislikes any princess he meets. His sisters-in-law prepare him food, but he complains about the meals they prepare. One day, the eldest sister-in-law prepares him his meal and still he complains. For this, the woman mocks him to find a bride named Kumari Anarmati, if he wishes to eat better dishes. The prince vows to find this Kumari Anarmati and departs home. He ventures into a forest and finds an ashram where a sadhu lives. The prince serves the sadhu for six months and waits for his meditative state to end. After six months, the prince tells the sadhu he is looking for Kumari Anarmati, and the holy man turns him into a parrot, advising him to fetch the largest fruit from a pomegranate tree in a garden north of there, then return to the ashram at once and not look back. The prince, in bird form, flies to the garden, that belongs to a magician, steals the fruit and flies back, but he begins to hear a commotion behind him (the guardians of the garden coming for him), looks behind himself and turns to stone. Back to the sadhu, noticing the prince's delay, looks for him and finds the petrified bird then revives him. The prince flies back to the garden, steals the fruit again and avoids looks behind himself. The sadhu restores the prince to human form and advises him to open the pomegranate only at home, not on the road.

The prince makes a turn home, but stops to rest in a garden near a village. He drinks water from the well and rests on a blanket on the ground, placing the pomegranate near his pillow. While he is asleep, his hand touches the fruit and out emerges the beautiful sixteen year old Kumari Anarmati. Anarmati goes to fan the prince, when a gardener girl (malin) comes to fetch water from the well. The malin girl sights Anarmati next to the sleeping prince and devises a plan to become queen: she convinces Anarmati to accompany her to the well and see their reflections in the water. She shoves her in the well and takes her place beside the prince. The prince wakes up, mistakes the malin for the true Kumari Anarmati and takes her home. As for the true Kumari Anarmati, she becoms a lotus flower in the well. During a hunt, the four princes pass by the well and find the flower which only the youngest can pluck and brings it home with him. The prince gives the lotus flower to the false Anarmati, who notices that it does not wither and questions the prince about its origins. The prince reveals he found it inside the garden well, which alerts the malin that the flower is Anarmati. Thus, she feigns illness and asks for the flower to be made into a paste to apply on her, but it begins to hurt her.

The malin throws the paste out of the window; where it fell, a mango tree sprouts, yielding succulent fruits. The prince tells the malin about it and she requests the tree to be felled. The prince plucks all fruits and distributes them among the servants, his cattle herd ("बरेदी", in the original) gaining the largest one. The cattle herd places the mango in a pot at his house. After eight days, the cattle herd goes to check on it, finds the mango is too ripe and out comes a beautiful girl he adopts as his daughter. One day, the girl is drying seeds when the prince's horse appears to eat them. The girl slaps the horse's behind to shoo it away, leaving a golden handprint. The prince discovers the handprint and decides to search for its owner by going to the cattle herd's house, where he finds the true Anarmati.

==== Other tales ====
===== Jammu =====
Researcher Noriko Mayeda and Indologist W. Norman Brown reported an Indian tale furnished by Sharda, a young female student from a school in Jammu. In this tale, a king has seven sons and arranges for the princes to leave home to another kingdom to fetch their wives. The youngest prince, however, suggests that someone should stay and defend the kingdom in case an attack happens. The elder princes agree, go to the distant kingdom, and return with their respective brides. Counting the number of princes and brides, the youngest prince learns that, since he stayed, they could not bring a wife for him. Later, his sisters-in-law mockingly say the seventh prince would want for wife only the girl named "Anarkali" ('Pomegranate Blossom'). The prince decides to search for her, and finds a sadhu's hut, which he tidies up. The sadhu comes and thanks the prince. In gratitude, after hearing his story, the sadhu gives him a stick for him to use against a pomegranate tree to pick a fruit and leave. It happens thus, and the prince plucks a pomegranate, then takes the fruit to open it by a well: the maiden Anarkali comes out of the fruit, so beautiful is she that he swoons. She hurries to a nearby river to draw water to revive him, and meets a dhoban, a washerwoman.

The dhoban tells Anarkali they first have to exchange clothes. The fairy falls for the ruse, and is shoved into the river, and the dhoban takes her place by the prince's side. Fooling the prince, the dhoban says she prefers they live away from his brothers. Back to the fairy, the remains of the fruit turn into a lotus flower by the well, which only the prince can catch. The false bride tears apart the flowers; where the petals fell, rivers spring up and many pomegranate trees. One of the pomegranates releases a fruit that is found by the gardener's wife. She releases a reborn Anarkali, and adopts her as her daughter. Some time later, she prepares flowers garlands, which draw the attention of the dhoban. The false princess orders the gardener's adoptive daughter to be brought before her. It happens thus, and the dhoban kills Anarkali, chops her body and buries them in the forest, where pomegranate trees sprout. Later, the prince is on a hunt and comes across a pair of parrots perched on one of the pomegranate trees: the birds are discussing Anarkali's story, and reveal the dhoban is the prince's wife, not the maiden. The prince asks the birds how he can find the maiden again, and they tell him to open one of the fruits of the trees. He does as instructed and again Anarkali appears to him. Now reunited with his true bride, he marries her and executes the dhoban.

===== Bhojpuri =====
In a Bhojpuri tale, a king has seven sons who are already married to seven princesses, save for the youngest one. For this, his sisters-in-law mock him by saying he will bring Anarkali ("अनारकली"; 'pomegranate blossom') with him. Despite the mockery, he decides to look for this girl. The prince spends the night in a city which, he learns, is being menaced by a demon that eats the youth of the city. The prince kills the demon and show the people its severed fingers. Grateful for his deed, the people direct him to the path to find Anarkali. The prince then finds a sage who sleeps for six months and remains awake for other six. The sage helps the youth in finding Anarkali by sending him to the garden where its blossom is located. However, the prince fails the first time and is killed by the demons guarding the flowers. The sage revives the prince and warns him again in getting Anarkali. The second time, the prince steals the pomegranate blossom and brings with him to the sage's hut, who turns the prince into a mosquito to ward off the demons. Soon, the sage hides Anarkali in the prince's thigh, places him on a horse and warns him to ride all the way back home, and to never stop until he reaches home.

The prince follows the sage's instructions at first, but, after a long journey, he stops to rest by a well and falls asleep. Suddenly, the flower on his thigh becomes a maiden wearing ornate jewels. A gardener's daughter (Malin) appears and convinces Anarkali to trade clothes and jewels with her, then asks her to compare reflections in the well. The Malin shoves Anarkali down the well, and takes her place beside the prince. The prince takes the Malin girl as his bride and marries her. As for the true Anarkali, she becomes a beautiful flower in the well that only the prince can pluck, which he brings to the false bride. The Malin girl tears it apart and throws the petals away. Where the petals fall, a tree sprouts bearing fruits the prince brings home with him. When the prince is not looking, Anarkali comes out of the fruit to prepare food, then returns to her disguise. The prince decides to investigate this and discovers Anarkali. He grabs her before she returns to the fruit, and she tells the whole story. The prince punishes the Malin girl and marries Anarkali.

=== Pakistan ===
Pakistani writer and poet Shafi Aqeel published a Pakistani Punjabi tale which was translated into English as Pomegranate Princess by writer Ahmad Bashir. In this tale, a king has seven sons of marriageable age, and sends an emissary to find suitable wives for them. The emissary stops at an inn, where he meets another king's emissary with a similar mission: to find seven suitable husbands for the king's seven daughters. Rejoicing at this fortunate coincidence, the respective kings arrange marriages between both their houses, but only six of the seven princes marry six of the seven princesses, save the youngest prince. His sisters-in-law, wanting to couple their cadette to the young prince, try to goad him during their marriage celebration, but, on his refusal, they mockingly tell him to marry Princess Pomegranate. On hearing their words, the youngest prince decides to journey and look for this princess, and finds a dead garden and a mendicant sleeping nearby in a hut. The mendicant lies in deep sleep, and the prince waters and takes care of the garden. After six months, the mendicant wakes up and, on seeing the now lush garden, thanks the prince for his good work.

The prince asks the mendicant to help him find Princess Pomegranate, and produces a ball which he throws on the ground, then advises the prince to follow the ball and fetch the fruit from the tree wherever it lands, and to open the fruit only when he is back home. The prince follows his instructions, plucks a large fruit, and goes back home. Before he goes back to his kingdom, he doubts the presence of the princess inside the fruit, and opens it: he releases Princess Pomegranate, but her beauty is so radiant and dazzling the prince faints. The princess places his head on her lap and tries to wake him up. Suddenly, the gardener's widowed daughter sights the pair and deduces the beautiful girl is the princess the prince went on a quest for. Princess Pomegranate goes for a drink in a nearby well, and the gardener's daughter convinces her to see her reflection down in the water. She changes clothes with the fruit princess and shoves her down a well, then takes her place by the prince's side. When the prince wakes up, he notices an ugly woman in a splendid dress, and mistakes her for the true Princess Pomegranate. Back to the real one, a red flower appears in the well, and the false bride wants it to be made into a paste for her feigned headache. It is done so, but the past enhances her false illness, so she throws the flower through the window. A patch of "succulent greens" sprouts, which the false bride wishes to be removed, thus the prince summons people to come and pluck the greens. The false bride tries to cook some of the green, which begin to talk back at her so she throws them in the garden.

A bed of flowers and a pomegranate tree also sprout where they fell, which the false princess also wants removed. People come to pluck the flowers and a little boy fetches one pomegranate which he takes home to feed his mother with. When they cut it open, the true Princess Pomegranate appears again and wants to be adopted by the boy's mother. Time passes, and the mother sells Princess Pomegranate's beautiful handmade handkerchiefs. The prince notices the handwork and falls in love with its maker, and arranges their marriage. He recognizes his new bride as the real Princess Pomegranate, who tells him the whole story, and punishes the false bride by dropping her into the same well.

== See also ==
- The Belbati Princess
- The Coconut Lady (Indian folktale)
- The Story of a Fairy and a Prince (Shan folktale)
- The Princess from the Fruit
- Maiden Belmuthi
