= The Story of a Fairy and a Prince =

Folk tale
- Name: The Story of a Fairy and a Prince
- Aarne–Thompson grouping: ATU 408, "The Love for Three Oranges"
- Mythology: Shan people
- Published in: Shans at Home, by Mrs. Leslie Milne (1910)
- Related: The Belbati Princess

The Story of a Fairy and a Prince is a folktale from the Shan people, collected by anthropologist Mrs. Leslie Milne from a Shan source. The tale is a local form of the tale "The Love for Three Oranges", which is classified as type ATU 408 of the international Aarne-Thompson-Uther Index (ATU). As with The Three Oranges, the tale deals with a prince's search for a bride that lives in a fruit (a bel-fruit), who is replaced by a false bride and goes through a cycle of incarnations until she regains physical form again.

== Source ==
According to anthropologist Mrs. Leslie Milne, the tale was some of the stories told her or written by Shans and translated from Shan language to English. The tale was later reprinted as part of a book of Shan legends.

== Summary ==
A king has seven sons, the elder six already married with children and the cadet still single. The king talks to his son about finding a wife, and the prince refuses to find a wife, before declaring he will only marry a fairy. For his words, the king orders his son to find a fairy bride in seven days, or perish by his sword. The prince ventures into the forest and meets an Elder, who directs him to a hermit in a cave, who directs him to yet another hermit. The second hermit knows the location of the fairy: in the garden behind his cave, there is a bale-fruit tree guarded by an ogre; the prince can climb the bel tree and pluck the topmost fruit when the ogre is asleep.

It happens thus, and the prince returns with the bale-fruit to the hermit's cave. The hermit then turns the fruit into a stone and the prince into a green parrot, to hide both as the ogre appears at the hermit's cave looking for the fruit thief. Finding nothing, the ogre returns to the garden. The hermit then restores the prince and the fruit and sends him back home, with an advice to open it at the palace. On the road, the prince begins to feel curious about the contents of the fruit and decides to open it. He reaches a garden next to a pool and cuts open the fruit: out comes a young fairy. He places her atop a tree and promises to return with an elephant as a mount for them, warning her not to talk to anyone.

After the prince leaves, a servant woman named Mai-pom-san-ta (Mai-pom-sam-ta, in another version) appears to draw water from the pool and sees the fairy's reflection in the water, mistaking it for her own. The fairy laughs at the woman's mistake, which clues the servant about her. Mai-pom-san-ta asks for explanations, but the fairy remains silent. Mai-pom-san-ta threatens the fairy with a pole, who tells the servant about the prince. The servant kills the fairy and tosses her body in a hole, then takes her clothes and climbs the tree to wait for the prince. The prince returns and notices the fairy looks different, which Mai-pom-san-ta explains the sun darkened her fairy skin and her tears deformed her face.

The prince believes her words and takes her as his bride. As for the fairy, she becomes a lotus flower in the pool of water. A gardener's old wife finds it and brings it to her house. Whenever the couple is not at home, the fairy comes out of the lotus tree to perform chores, then returns to it. The gardener couple discover her and adopt her. One day, when the gardener's wife leaves, the fairy girl rips the lotus flower to weave the story of the prince's quest on its petals. The gardener couple sells it to the market, and a prince's servant buys them. The prince recognizes the images on the lotus and asks the servant where he bought them. The prince is told of the gardener couple and their daughter and brings her to the palace as another servant.

Mai-pom-san-ta recognizes the gardener's daughter as the fairy girl and falsely claims she is a witch. The prince believes the false bride's words and orders the girl to be put to death. The soldiers take the fairy girl to be killed, and before her execution she says a prayer for her eyes to become a pair of green parrots. She is then killed, and her eyes become a pair of birds that talk to each other. The prince's servants listen to the birds' conversation which distracts them, the prince himself goes to investigate and finds the parrots. He overhears them talking about how the prince quested for a fairy, how he found her, how the real fruit fairy was killed and replaced by Mai-pom-san-ta, and how she will descend from the skies in seven days' time to bathe in a certain pond. The prince lies in waiting for seven days and nights and finds the fruit princess again in the pool. He catches her, but she says she has been killed twice and cannot be with the prince. The prince then promises to kill Mai-pom-san-ta, which he does, and takes the fruit fairy with him.

== Analysis ==
=== Tale type ===
The tale is classified in the international Aarne-Thompson-Uther Index as tale type ATU 408, "The Three Oranges". Scholar Christine Goldberg, in her monograph about tale type ATU 408, grouped the Shan tale with other variants from India. In the Indian variants, the protagonist goes in search of the fairy princess on his sisters-in-law's mocking, finds her and brings her home, but an ugly woman of low social standing kills and replaces her. The fairy princess, then, goes through a cycle of transformations until she regains physical form.

In an article in Enzyklopädie des Märchens, scholar Christine Shojaei Kawan separated the tale type into six sections, and stated that parts 3 to 5 represented the "core" of the story:

- (1) A prince is cursed by an old woman to seek the fruit princess;
- (2) The prince finds helpers that guide him to the princess's location;
- (3) The prince finds the fruits (usually three), releases the maidens inside, but only the third survives;
- (4) The prince leaves the princess up a tree near a spring or stream, and a slave or servant sees the princess's reflection in the water;
- (5) The slave or servant replaces the princess (transformation sequence);
- (6) The fruit princess and the prince reunite, and the false bride is punished.

=== Motifs ===
==== The maiden's appearance ====
According to the tale description in the international index, the maiden may appear out of the titular citrus fruits, like oranges and lemons. However, she may also come out of pomegranates or other species of fruits, and even eggs. In Stith Thompson and Jonas Balys's Oral Tales of India, this motif is indexed as "D211. Transformation: man to fruit". More specific motifs to the story include "D431.6.1.2. Woman emerges from fruit" and "T543.3. Birth from fruit".

==== The transformations and the false bride ====
The tale type is characterized by the substitution of the fairy wife for a false bride. The usual occurrence is when the false bride (a witch or a slave) sticks a magical pin into the maiden's head or hair and she becomes a dove. (Note: "The motif of a woman stabbed in her head with a pin occurs in AT 403 (in India) and in AT 408 (in the Middle East and southern Europe).") Christine Shojaei-Kawan notes that variants of Indian tradition lack the motif of the false bride mistaking the fruit maiden's reflection in the well for her own. Instead, generally in these tales the hero faints and the fruit princess goes to fetch water to awake him, when a girl of lower caste notices the fruit princess and trades clothes with her, then drowns her in water.

In other variants, the maiden goes through a series of transformations after her liberation from the fruit and regains a physical body. (Note: As Hungarian-American scholar Linda Dégh put it, "(...) the Orange Maiden (AaTh 408) becomes a princess. She is killed repeatedly by the substitute wife's mother, but returns as a tree, a pot cover, a rosemary, or a dove, from which shape she seven times regains her human shape, as beautiful as she ever was".) In that regard, according to Christine Shojaei-Kawan's article, Christine Goldberg divided the tale type into two forms. In the first subtype, indexed as AaTh 408A, the fruit maiden suffers the cycle of metamorphosis (fish-tree-human) – a motif Goldberg locates "from the Middle East to Italy and France". In the second subtype, AaTh 408B, the girl is transformed into a dove by the needle. In this light, researcher Noriko Mayeda and Indologist W. Norman Brown noted that the fruit maiden "generally" goes from human to flower, then to tree, to fruit again, and finally regains human form.

In addition, in Indian variants, after a cycle of transformations into a flower and a tree, the false wife orders the fruit maiden's execution. The fruit maiden's body parts then form a palace for her to dwell and two birds that repeat her story to the prince.

== Variant ==
=== Nang Maag Bin ===
In another tale from the Shan people with the title Nang Maag Bin ("Princess Fruit Bale"), published in the Journal of the Burma Research Society, the king of the land of Mong Hsing Hko sends his son, the prince, to learn the princely arts. The prince becomes apprenticed to a hermit, who tells the prince of a princess inside a bale fruit in a tree in a garden guarded by giants. With the hermit's help, the prince steals the fruit and is advised to open it at home. On the road, however, he begins to talk to the princess inside the fruit and both fall in love with each other. Near the entrance to his kingdom, the prince opens the fruit and releases a beautiful princess he guides atop a tree next to a well. While the prince goes away to bring his father to meet his fairy bride, a rich man's ugly maid goes to fetch water for her master, sees the princess's visage in the water, and gives up doing the task, breaking the pots. The maid then discovers the fruit princess atop the tree, pulls her down, kills her and throws her body in a well, then takes her place. The prince returns and brings the ugly maid back to the palace, thinking she is the true princess. As for the real princess, she goes through a cycle of transformations: lotus flower, then a mango tree, which the false bride wants destroyed. Despite trying to destroy the princess, a mango survives and is washed down a stream to the king's gardener's house. The gardener and his wife take the mango and bring it home. Whenever they are not at home, the princess comes out of the mango to do chores and returns to it. The gardener couple discover her and adopt her as their daughter. One day, she weaves a flower wreath in a way that tells her whole story, and the gardener's wife delivers it to the prince. Later, the prince goes to the gardener's house, finds his true bride there and takes her home. The false bride then plants some finger and toenails in the princess's hair to pin her as a witch, and the fruit princess is ordered to be executed. Before she dies, she prays to God that her body becomes a large rest-house, her eyes two parrots, her limbs a golden mango tree, whose fruit is sweet to good people and sour to people with evil intent. The princess dies; the rest-house appears, but her soul becomes one of seven angels of a distant silver mountain. The prince visits the rest-house with a retinue, and, when he is alone, a parrot reveals the location of the true princess. The prince goes to the lake where the angels descend to take a bath and steals the clothes of the fruit princess. The other angels depart, but the true princess returns with the prince to his kingdom. The false bride is swallowed by the ground, and the prince and princess reign in happiness. According to its collector, B. R. Pearn, nang means 'princess', maag translates to 'fruit', and bin refers to the bael fruit.

== See also ==
- The Pomegranate Fairy (Indian folktale)
- The Coconut Lady (Indian folktale)
- The Belbati Princess
- The Princess from the Fruit
