= The Princess from the Fruit =

Indian folktale

The Princess from the Fruit is an Indian folktale from Goa. The tale is a local form of tale type ATU 408, "The Love for Three Oranges", of the international Aarne-Thompson-Uther Index. As with The Three Oranges, the tale deals with a prince's search for a bride that lives in a fruit, who is replaced by a false bride and goes through a cycle of incarnations, until she regains physical form again. Variants are known across India with other species of fruits.

== Summary ==
In this tale, a king has an only son who is very fond of hunting. One day, he is joined with the chief minister's son and both venture into a deep forest. They go their separate ways, but promise to meet again at a certain spot. On a path, the prince sights a gold-feathered bird and chases after it, but the animal flies away. The prince follows after it and decides to listen to its sweet voice. The bird suddenly talks and says that, if the bird's beauty impresses the prince, much more beautiful is the princess from the fruit, then vanishes. The prince is moved by the bird's words and decides to search for the princess from the fruit. The prince returns to his father's stables and a black servant reports to the king. The prince tells his parents he wishes to find and marry this girl, but the monarchs say the journey is dangerous. Still, the prince goes on a journey and reaches the hut of an old woman. He explains the reason for his quest and spends the night there. The old woman reiterates the perils of the journey, but the prince insists and rewards the old woman with two gold coins.

The old woman then agrees to help the prince: she will turn him into a crow so he can fly over the pertrified victims who failed in the quest, fly up to the tree where the fruit it and steal it with his beak, then he is to fly back to her hut without looking back. It happens thus, and the prince, in crow form, steals the fruit and returns to the old woman's hut. She turns him back to human form and tells him to open the fruit only when he is near home. The prince rides back home, but decides to stop by a lake to rest and open the fruit to see the princess. He opens the fruit and out comes a golden-haired princess that dazzles the prince he faints. The fruit princess tries to help the prince and rushes to the lake to draw some water to revive him. She finds a dark servant grazing her master's horse. The dark servant shoves the princess down in the lake and goes to wake up the prince herself. The prince mistakes the servant for the princess and takes her home. His parents look at the girl and doubt if she is the princess from the fruit, but they are glad with their son's return and go through with their marriage. As for the true fruit princess, she becomes a lotus flower in the lake that only the prince can pluck it. The prince takes the lotus with him, which his parents admire, but the dark servant fears it will reveal her deed, boils it in water and throws it away. On the place it falls, a capsicum tree sprouts which the false bride cuts down and flings out the gate. However, another tree sprouts in its place, yielding a unique fruit that sates people's hunger. The false bride asks the prince to cut it down, so people flock the palace to plucks its fruits before the tree is cut down. An old woman that lives in the palace sends her grandson to fetch some fruits, but there is none, for people have plucked them all. The boy informs his grandmother, who sends him again to the palace, this time to get the tree trunk to their house. While the old woman is busy with some other task, she sends her grandson to look after their paddy, but he plays with other boys and a buffalo eats their paddy. Suddenly, the fruit princess emerges from the tree trunk and shoos away the buffalo.

The prince's false bride sights the princess and orders some guards to cut down the tree trunk, kill the princess and bring back her heart and liver. The workmen go to carry out her orders, but the fruit princess gives them her necklace as bribe and is spared, then hides in the forest, while the workmen trick the prince's wife. The fruit princess makes a house for herself in a dangerous part of the forest and keeps a parrot as her pet, to which she teaches her life story. Later, the prince loses his way in the forest and finds the princess's house, asking its owner for shelter from the lions and tigers. The princess does not let him in, but allows him to stay in her verandah. The prince then asks the voice on the other side of the door how she came to be in the forest, and the princess tells him everything. The prince recognizes the princess by her story and shows himself to her, then both return to his palace. The prince beheads the dark servant that tricked him, introduces the true fruit princess to his parents, and marries her.

== Analysis ==
=== Tale type ===
The tale is classified in the international Aarne-Thompson-Uther Index as tale type ATU 408, "The Three Oranges". In the Indian variants, the protagonist goes in search of the fairy princess on his sisters-in-law's mocking, finds her and brings her home, but an ugly woman of low social standing kills and replaces her. The fairy princess, then, goes through a cycle of transformations until she regains physical form.

In an article in Enzyklopädie des Märchens, scholar Christine Shojaei Kawan separated the tale type into six sections, and stated that parts 3 to 5 represented the "core" of the story:

1. A prince is cursed by an old woman to seek the fruit princess;
2. The prince finds helpers that guide him to the princess's location;
3. The prince finds the fruits (usually three), releases the maidens inside, but only the third survives;
4. The prince leaves the princess up a tree near a spring or stream, and a slave or servant sees the princess's reflection in the water;
5. The slave or servant replaces the princess (transformation sequence);
6. The fruit princess and the prince reunite, and the false bride is punished.

=== Motifs ===
==== The maiden's appearance ====
According to the tale description in the international index, the maiden may appear out of the titular citrus fruits, like oranges and lemons. However, she may also come out of pomegranates or other species of fruits, and even eggs. In Stith Thompson and Jonas Balys's Oral Tales of India, this motif is indexed as "D211. Transformation: man to fruit".

==== The transformations and the false bride ====
The tale type is characterized by the substitution of the fairy wife for a false bride. The usual occurrence is when the false bride (a witch or a slave) sticks a magical pin into the maiden's head or hair and she becomes a dove. (Note: "The motif of a woman stabbed in her head with a pin occurs in AT 403 (in India) and in AT 408 (in the Middle East and southern Europe).") Christine Shojaei-Kawan notes that variants of Indian tradition lack the motif of the false bride mistaking the fruit maiden's reflection in the well for her own. Instead, generally in these tales the hero faints and the fruit princess goes to fetch water to awake him, when a girl of lower caste notices the fruit princess and trades clothes with her, then drowns her in water.

In other variants, the maiden goes through a series of transformations after her liberation from the fruit and regains a physical body. (Note: As Hungarian-American scholar Linda Dégh put it, "(...) the Orange Maiden (AaTh 408) becomes a princess. She is killed repeatedly by the substitute wife's mother, but returns as a tree, a pot cover, a rosemary, or a dove, from which shape she seven times regains her human shape, as beautiful as she ever was".) In that regard, according to Christine Shojaei-Kawan's article, Christine Goldberg divided the tale type into two forms. In the first subtype, indexed as AaTh 408A, the fruit maiden suffers the cycle of metamorphosis (fish-tree-human) - a motif Goldberg locates "from the Middle East to Italy and France". In the second subtype, AaTh 408B, the girl is transformed into a dove by the needle. In this light, researcher Noriko Mayeda and Indologist W. Norman Brown noted that the fruit maiden "generally" goes from human to flower, then to tree, to fruit again, and finally regains human form.

== Variants ==
=== India ===
While organizing the Indic index, Stith Thompson and Warren Roberts noted the close proximity between types 403, "The Black and the White Bride", and 408, "The Three Oranges" - types that deal with the theme of the "Substituted Bride". To better differentiate between them, both scholars remarked that the heroine must be replaced by a female antagonist that is unrelated to her. Thompson's second revision of the international type index listed 17 variants of tale type 408 in India and South Asia. In some of the Indian tales, the heroine does not come out of a fruit, but she is still replaced by the false bride and goes through a cycle of transformations. Despite this, these stories are indexed as the same tale type.

Examples of stories that lack the heroine's birth from the fruit, but keep the cycle of transformations, include Indian tales Phúlmati Rání, The Apple Princess and Raní Jhajhaní (or Rani Jajhani), and Sri Lankan The Maehiyallē-gama Princess. Other tales of the same narrative encompass Sema Naga stories Muchüpile and Tseipu and Kawulipu, Lhota Naga Hunchibili, (Note: In a footnote, Hutton stated that the tale Hunchibili was from the Lhotas, but versions of it existed among the Angami Nagas and the Semas.) Zeme Kirumbe, Mizo story Tumchhingi leh Raldawna ("The Story of Tumchhingi & Raldawna" or "Raldawana and Tumchingi"), Thadou Kuki Ashijoul or Ahsijolneng, Lushai The Story of Tlumtea and his Brothers (Note: The tale is also called Vanchungnula or Vanchungnula (The maiden of heaven).) and Khasi A Tale of the Takalong Cucumber.

==== Princess Fireflower ====
In a tale collected by William Crooke from Mirzapur with the title Princess Fireflower and published in the Indian Antiquary, a raja has two sons, the elder married and the younger still unmarried. One day, he complains to his sister-in-law about her not making him food, and she mockingly tells him to seek the "Princess Fireflower" (in the original, Aṅgârkall Râni, or "the flower of blazing charcoal"). Moved by her words, the prince decides to seek the maiden, and travels to the forest of Brindaban Khakharapur, where he meets a fakir. The fakir hears the prince's story, and agrees to help him: he will turn the youth to a parrot, so he can fly over to the island where the princess is; he is to avoid the demons (deos), pluck a flower and fly back to him, and not look back. It happens thus and the prince steals a flower; the demons tell him to turn around, he does and is burnt to death by the creatures. Noticing his prolonged absence, the fakir flies to the island, resurrects the prince and turns him into a crow this time. The prince seizes this second chance, grabs the flower and flies back to the fakir's hut, where he is turned into a cat to trick the demons that followed him. Fooled by the fakir, the demons depart; the fakir restores the prince and gives him a red-lead box (sindurdan), which he is to open back at his kingdom. The prince reaches the confines of his kingdom and opens the box: a "twelve year old" girl comes out of it. The prince wants to bring her some water, but she offers to bring him some, and goes to a well.

At the well, a Rajá's handmaid is also fetching water, and suggests she and Princess Fireflower trade clothes and see their reflections in the water. The young princess falls for the trick and is shoved in the well, while the handmaid takes her place. A month later, a blaze appears by the well, and the prince goes to investigate. He finds a flower bed in the well and brings it home in a handkerchief. One day, he accidentally drops it into the ground, and his son with the false princess finds the flower, then gives it to his mother. The false princess throws it into a dung heap, where a mango tree sprouts. The false princess wants the tree felled down, but the prince orders it to be removed to another location, and let no one but him touch its fruits. His orders are carried out. The tree is preserved, and yields fruits. One day, a mango falls and the gardener's wife finds it and brings it home. The princess leaves the mango and is adopted by the gardender's family. One day, the false princess learns of this and orders the keeper of the elephants to crush the princess at the gardener's house. She is brought to the forest to the executed, but a Dom tells the executioner to spare her. The princess is let go and creates a palace in the forest with her powers, with two parrots perched at the entrance. Some time later, the Rajá and his younger son journey through the woods, find Princess Fireflower's palace, and hear the birds talk about her lifestory and the handmaid's deception. Princess Fireflower confirms the story and marries the prince, while the handmaid is punished.

==== The Banana Flower Princess ====
In an Assamese tale collected by A. C. Hazarika and translated as The Banana Flower Princess, a prince goes to have lunch at his poor friend's house and is given a banana flower he must only open at home. The prince, on the road, opens the flower, and out comes a beautiful girl. They fall in love with each other, and the prince places the princess near a bench next to a pond, promising to return with a litter. While he is away, a demoness approaches the princess in feigned friendship and asks her to take off her ornaments and clothes, gives her some rags, and shoves her down in the pond, uttering a mantra for the princess to become a lotus flower. The demoness dons the princess's clothes and tricks the prince when he returns. The prince also takes the lotus flower with him and places it on his bed. At night, the Banana Flower Princess comes out of the flower to cry for her situation in the form of a story to a lamp, then begins to reenter the lotus. The prince, who overheard the tale, stops her from entering the flower. He hides her inside another palace, and goes to confront the demoness the following morning. He executes her under seven elephants and marries the Banana Flower Princess.

==== The Story of the Corn Queen ====
In a Raj Gond tale collected by ethnologist Christoph von Fürer-Haimendorf with the title The Story of the Corn Queen, Sri Shembu Mahadeo creates twelve tribes of men, and live on wild fruits, wild roots and leaves. This worries Sri Shembu, who wants to find the Corn Queen to nourish mankind. The deity summons Raja Bikram and bids him find the Corn Queen. One night, feeling thirsty, Raja Bikram orders his wives to fetch him water, but they refuse. The man admonishes them and says he will look for the Corn Queen as his newest wife, and on the mere mention of her name the water flows from his cup to his mouth. Raja Bikram journeys to many worlds, where people and plants are of a single colour (a yellow world, then red, black, white, brass, copper, silver and lastly gold). Raja Bikram stops to rest under a banyan tree, and protects a nest of Gurulupang bird chicks from a snake that has always menaced it. The next morning, the bird parents appear and, in gratitude, they carry the king over the ocean to the place where he can find the Corn Queen. The birds advise him to cut off the jawari stalk of corn, then open it only at home, after he makes a puja. The king makes his way home and decides to cut open the sheath of corn before he enters his town, and finds a girl of six months and a year old inside the corn. He places her under a tree and returns to his hometown to bring back a retinue. Meanwhile, Lali, a servant girl, goes to meet the Corn Queen and tricks the girl to trade clothes with her, then shoves her inside a well and takes her place.

As for the true Corn Queen, she turns into a red flower inside the well, which the gardener brings to plant in the garden and it turns into a sandalwood tree. Every night, the true Corn Queen comes out of the tree and dances in the courtyard, mocking Raja Bikram for falling for the trick Lali played on her. One day, Lail listens to the song, meets the Corn Queen, falsely console her, and the next morning lies that the sandalwood tree is cursed and must be destroyed. The king orders the tree to be felled down and burnt, but a splinter survives which a Brahmin brings home to scent his bathwater. The splinter turns into a taro plant from which the Corn Queen also appears to repeat her mocking song and dance at night. Lali discovers the Corn Queen's newest incarnations (wild spinach and roselle), and the Raja's men uproot the roselle, causing some of its seeds to become a fig tree and others a jawari millet. One night, Raja Bikram hears her song and goes to meet the real Corn Queen in the courtyard, begging for her forgiveness. The Corn Queen asks him to pick up the millet and open its beat its seeds with sticks. The next morning, the Raja beats Lali in public and punishes her, then does as the Corn Queen instructed, resurrecting her back to the form he found her when he opened the ear of corn. On the presence of the Corn Queen among their people, a bountiful harvest appears in their land. However, Raja Bikram and the other Gonds worry about their fabulous wealth and plentiful harvest, then the king banishes her from his country.

The Corn Queen warns that, if she leaves, the land will grow poor. Despite her warning, it happens thus, and the girl departs, taking their prosperity and wealth with her. According to Fürer-Haimendorf, the tale of the Corn Queen, Anarani, was provided by an informant named Kanaka Moti, and the tale is told in the context of the growth of the crops.

==== The Beautiful Woman in the Elephant's Ear ====
In a tale from Lakshadweep and translated to English with the title The Beautiful Woman in the Elephant's Ear, the tale describes that the woman lives in the ear of an elephant, comes out during full moon nights, gathers fruits and flowers and returns to her place of origin. Meanwhile, a lazy youth lives with his mother, who bids him to study, for then she will bring him the woman who lives in the elephant's ear. The youth becomes interested in this woman, goes to school to finish his studies, and returns home. He asks his mother about this woman's location, and she points to the road. During his journey, he finds a hut with a granny inside whom he asks if she knows where he can find the woman in the elephant's ear. The granny directs the youth to a banyan tree in the east, under which lies the tusker from which she comes. The granny also gives him instructions on how to approach her and win her heart: the youth takes some pomegranates, climbs the banyan tree, and waits. As soon as the full moon appears, he drops the pomegranates down the branches, and the beautiful woman comes out of the elephant's ear to smell the fruits. The youth quickly grabs her and runs with her towards his village. He stops before his village and decides to bring his mother to come see her, places a pendant on her neck and guides her atop a tree, then goes back home. While he leaves, other women from his village come to draw water by the well near the tree, notice the beauty of the elephant's ear woman's visage in water and break their pots.

Later, a cunning woman comes to the well, sees the elephant's ear woman and, feigning friendship, tricks her to give her silk saree and necklace. The elephant's ear woman does as asked, but the cunning woman shoves the other down the well and replaces her atop the tree. The lazy youth comes back with his mother and notices the woman atop the tree looks different, and becomes furious. The false bride cries and lies that the rain and the snow darkened her skin due to the youth leaving her there. Still, the youth's mother believes the girl's lie and marries her to her son. Despite being married, the youth is still sad, and thinks of the other maiden he found. One day, he passes by the well, finds some spinach leaves inside it and takes them home for his wife to cook it. The false bride prepares the leaves and cooks them, but a voice echoes from inside the pot, revealing she is in fact a shoemaker's daughter. The false bride fears her true identity will be discovered, but the youth eats the fried spinach leaves. Suddenly, a light comes from the spinach and goes up the stairs of his house. The youth follows it to the second story of the house and finds the real woman from the elephant's ear, naked. The youth returns her the saree and the necklace the false bride stole from her. The false bride flees the house before they discover her ruse, and the youth marries the true woman from the elephant's ear.

==== The Orphan Boy (Toto) ====
In a tale from the Toto people with the Toto title Mouriā Hā, translated as The Orphan Boy, a mouria (a poor boy) is given shelter by a local lord and grazes his cattle, but cannot eat proper food. One day, he cries for his situation, when an old woman appears and helps the boy in getting food: he is to find the red cow in the herd and hit its left horn for molasses and its right horn for rice. The boy does as instructed and finds a nice meal, and hides the surplus food in a cloth inside a tree trunk. However, a crane appears and eats the boy's hidden cache of food. After three days, the poor boy discovers the Crane, which begs him not to hurt him, for it will fly with the boy to its house. The bird asks the boy to tie some mustard seeds to its tail and follow the trail. It happens thus, and the boy walks deep into the forest, where he finds the house of same old woman that helped him. Once again, the old woman advises the boy: he is to enter the Crane's house through the side door, not from the front, and ask for a phial. The boy goes to the Crane's house and asks for the phial, which the bird advises to open only at home. As the boy returns to his house, the phial begins to weigh more in his hands, and the boy wants to discover why: he opens up the bottle and out comes a beautiful girl. The boy places the girl atop a tree and goes to bring people from the village to help him. While he goes away, an ogress appears, devours the girl, assumes her form and takes her place atop the tree. The poor boy comes back and takes the disguised ogress with him to a house, where he lives with her and they have a child. Some days later, the boy plants some pumpkin seeds, which grow into a vine that hangs on the doorframe. The ogress dislikes this and throws out the pumpkin vines and the pumpkin, which turn into a Birse-Ko-Sing (pamelo tree). The ogress's son rests under the shade of the pamelo tree and the pamelo fruit falls on his head, killing him. For this, the ogress orders some men to fell down the tree. The same old woman comes back and asks the poor boy for a pamelo fruit, which she brings home with her. While she is away, the girl from the phial comes out of the pamelo. The girl asks the old woman for some betel leaf, an arecanut and a pot. The girl chews the betel and fills the pot with sputum, which she places inside the poor boy's house. The poor boy finds the pot, mistakes it for blood and consults with the old woman how to kill the ogress. The old woman advises him to gather a large amount of gudi (arecanut), prepare a pit and convince the ogress to look into the pit, then behead her. It happens thus, and the poor boy goes to meet the old woman, who introduces him to his true bride, the maiden from the phial.

==== Gulmakumari ====
In a Tripuri tale titled "গুল্মকুমারী" ("Gulmakumari"; "The Bush Maiden"), in a household in a village, seven brothers live with seven wives, and work in the jhum fields. One day, while working the jhum, the youngest brother finds a remarkable, fragrant bush he shows to his elder siblings. After the family returns home from the fieldwork, the cadet brings with him the bush and places it on a shelf, forbidding people from touching it, even his wife, an ugly woman named Chilaikumari, with unhygienic habits. In the middle of the night, a beautiful woman emerges from the bush, emitting a sweet fragrance around the house, then plasters the floor, does the dishes and cooks rice and some vegetable dishes. She chews some betel leaves and returns to the bush. Chilaikumari wakes up and wakes up her husband, Lokoi, to see how the house looks different. Lokoi sees that the household chores are done and believes his wife did it. This goes on for some time, with Lokoi warning his wife not to touch anything from the bush. However, Lokoi is too entranced by the bush, relinquishing his marital duties, to Chilaikumari's anger. One day, while her husband is away at the jhum, she cuts down the bush and tosses it on a trash heap. Lokoi returns home, does not find his beloved bush, and grieves for it. Later, a lemon tree sprouts where the bush tree was thrown, and yields a lemon that Lokoi brings home. The lemon produces a fragrant smell, and the same woman from before comes out of the lemon to do chores around the house, chews a paan (betel leaf), and returns to the fruit. Lokoi grows to cherish the lemon just as the bush from before, to Chilaikumari's irritation. Fed up with her husband's fondness for the fruit, she cuts the lemon and throws the peels. Lokoi returns home from the jhum, learns the lemon is no more, and scolds his wife. Where the lemon peels fall, a large bottle gourd vine sprouts, yielding a large gourd in the couple's yard. Lokoi builds a trellis around the gourd and warns his wife not to touch it. Chilaikumari goes to sweep the yard, when a woman comes out of the gourd to kick her, then returns to the vegetable. Chilaikumari is kicked daily, to her increasing irritation, so she tells her husband they need to eat the gourd and get rid of the vines for her to clean out the yard properly. Lokoi becomes angry at the suggestion, and brings the gourd home. While he is away, his wife takes the gourd and cooks it with curry. Lokoi returns home, learns his wife cooked the gourd, becomes angry at her, and avoids eating the dish. Since the gourd seeds are too hard, the couple drop the dish in water, where it turns into a lata fish. When Chilaikumari goes to fetch water for the house, the fish muddies the waters. Lokoi complains to his wife about the dirty water, but she blames the fish, and suggests they should cook it. Lokoi captures the fish, which Chilaikumari prepares. However, a fish bone gets stuck in his throat, so they throw the dish away again. Where the fish bones were thrown, a coconut tree sprouts, bearing a single coconut. Lokoi brings the coconut home, and the enigma of the mysterious person who performs chores at home is back, to Lokoi's puzzlement. Lokoi's friends notice he is worrying about the mysterious person and becoming too thin, so they advise him to stay awake by harming his finger and applying salt to the wound. Lokoi does so, and finds a woman coming out of the coconut, who then proceeds to chew some betel and mutters aloud that the house looks like a pigsty, blaming Chilaikumari for its sorry state. Lokoi grabs the bush maiden before she leaves, digs a pit in the forest to throw Chilaikumari in and buries her alive, then returns home and marries Gulmakumari. The tale was classified as type 407 of the international Aarne-Thompson Index.

=== Tibet ===
In a Tibetan tale collected from a source named Gangchen with the title Drolmakyid the Fairy, a good but mischievous prince throws a stone at a woman carrying a water bucket. The woman sees that it was the prince, and he goes to help her. In return, the woman blesses him to search for Drolmakyid, who lives inside an orange in a deep forest. The prince rides a white stallion to the forest, steals the fruit and rushes back to the palace, then peels the orange to release Drolmakyid. The royal couple arrange the prince's wedding to the fairy and hire a girl that is a spitting image of Drolmakyid as her lady-in-waiting, but she is a witch in disguise. One day, the trio go to the woods for a stroll, and, while the prince is asleep, the witch convinces Drolmakyid to trade clothes and ornaments with her and look at their reflections in the water, then shoves the fairy in the lake. The witch replaces Drolmakyid as the prince's wife, while the fairy becomes a golden lotus in the lake surface, which a horse-groom sees and informs the prince. The prince tries to find the flower for three days, to no avail, when the horse-groom advises him to disguise as a horse-groom and wait for the flower. It happens thus, and the prince plucks the golden lotus and brings it home. The witch realizes the lotus is Drolmakyid's new form, and burns it in a fire in the mountains when the prince is away. From the ashes a walnut tree sprouts, whose fruits the witch tells the prince to let people gather. After the people remove the walnuts, the witch orders the tree to be felled down. Meanwhile, a poor son who lives with his mother goes to fetch a walnut and finds a green one which he bring home with him. After the old woman and her son leave the house and return, they find the food prepare, then decide to investigate: after three days, they find a maiden coming out of the walnut. The old woman adopts the fairy and she lives with them. One day, Drolmakyid is asked to place some tubers on the roof of the house, but she dons a conical hat to hide her face, since the old woman's house is next to the prince's palace. The witch goes to rest on the palace veranda and notices Drolmakyid on the old woman's roof house. The witch orders some soldiers to capture the girl that lives with the old woman, since she is a witch, and she must be burnt in a glade and her ashes strewn about. The soldiers capture Drolmakyid and burn her. On the place of her execution, a nine-storey palace with golden pillars appears. Some time later, the prince goes for a ride in the mountains and finds the palace. The prince decides to enter the place and explores its confines, finding a reborn Drolmakyid in the prayer hall of the ninth floor. The prince realizes the fairy Drolmakyid is alive and that the one who is living at the palace is an impostor. Soon, the witch rushes to the mysterious golden palace to see Drolmakyid for herself and falls into a hole in the ground in the last floor, killing herself. The prince and Drolmakyid live happily. (Note: Scholar Christine Goldberg, in her monograph about tale type ATU 408, grouped the Tibetan tale with other variants from India.)

=== Bangladesh ===
==== The Maiden of the Banana Tree ====
In a tale from the Tanchangya people, sourced from Bandarban District and translated to Bengali as "কলাথুর কন্যা পসন" or "কলাখু কন্যা পসন" ("Kalakhu Kanya Pasan"; "The Maiden of the Banana Tree"), an old couple have a son. The man dies, and the woman raises her son. When he grows up, his semblance is downcast, so his mother asks him the reason why. He tells his mother he wants to travel far from home, and she prepares him food wrapped in banana leaves. The youth reaches another country and meets an old woman whom he greets as grandmother and asks for shelter. The old woman welcomes him in and employs him in her rice plantation. One day, the old woman asks the youth to gather the rice that is bring dried up in the Sun while she goes to draw water by the river. After the old woman leaves, the youth falls asleep during his work. When he wakes up, he finds seven beautiful maidens shaking the dried rice. The youth notices the beauty of the seventh maiden, and wants to have her. However, they hear the sound of the old woman coming from the river and make a run for it, each one entering the banana trees next to the old woman's house. The youth memorizes the tree where the maiden he chose entered, and sits on a tree stump. The old woman approaches him, and he says he wishes to return home now, for he misses his mother. The old woman bids him pluck a banana from the trees near his house and unpeel it slowly on the road back home, over the five or six hills before his house.

The youth plucks the banana from the tree the maiden hid in, and makes his way back home. On the road, he peels the fruit and releases the banana maiden. However, he cannot carry her home, so he leaves her up a banyan tree next to a well, while he goes home to bring a horse for her. After he leaves, a magical demon that lived by well notices the beautiful banana maiden up the tree, and tries to trick her: the demon asks her to prepare some paan with the sap and the leaves of the banyan tree she is on. The banana maiden makes some paan and drops it from her position ont the ground. The demon complains and asks the maiden to prepare another, and for her to hold out her hand with the new paan. It happens thus, but the demon pulls down the maiden and throws her in the well, then assumes her form and replaces her atop the tree. As for the true banana maiden, she turns into a red lotus in the well. The youth returns with the horse, but the animal does not allow the disguised demon to mount it. Still, the youth takes the false maiden home and the red lotus from the well, which he places in a box.

The youth's peace at home is broken by the wicked demon, so he takes comfort in gazing at the red lotus. One day, the false maiden discovers the youth pays attention to the lotus, so when he is away she takes the flower, rips it apart and throws it away. On the spot where the petals fall, a gourd tree sprouts and grows so much its vines touch the youth's house. It also yields a large gourd, which taps the youth whenever he walks and hits the false maiden whenever she passes by it. Annoyed at the situation, the demon takes the gourd, cooks it and eats it, leaving some for the youth. He does not eat it and throws it in the yard. Where the food falls, a betel tree sprouts, yielding betel nuts. A neighbouring old couple pass by the tree and fetches a betel nut which they bring home. When they leave for work and return, they find the food cooked for them. The man decides to stand guard, but drinks too much and fails; out of the betel nut comes the banana maiden, who does the chores and returns to the nut. The woman decides to investigate and discovers the banana maiden, and grabs her before she returns to the betel nut. The banana maiden lives with them, but the old woman dyes her skin with paint to hide her from danger. One day, the youth rides his horse and approaches the house of the neighbouring couple. The old woman tries to keep the maiden hidden, but the youth spots her, enters the house and asks for a drink of water. The old woman offers him one, but he wants the maiden to serve him one. The banana maiden brings some water, and the liquid smears away the paint on her skin, revealing her true form. The youth realizes who she is and brings her home. At his home, the true banana maiden retells her story, and the false bride returns to her true form and bursts in anger. The youth lives with the true maiden from the banana tree.

==== Kalavati Kanya ====
In a Tripuri tale published by author Prabhangshu Tripura and translated to Bengali as "কলাবতী কন্যা" ("Kalavati Kanya"), a Naran of Tailaifang Pargana, in the kingdom of Tripura, has five sons, four of them already married to beautiful wives, save the youngest, Chota Kumar. The cadet prince is mocked by his sisters-in-law due to his laziness, and the four women worry about the prince not finding a bride. Chota Kumar overhears their conversation and decides to find himself a bride, so he departs. On the road, he meets a lovely weaving maiden he likes at first, until he sees her rotten teeth. Next, he reaches another village and sees a young woman drawing water; he even talks to her father about his intentions, but dislikes her face and eyes. Feeling deject and nearly admitting defeat, Chota Kumar sights a house in a clearing, surrounded by banana trees. He sees a maiden near the house who enters the banana trees and vanishes. The prince then enters the house, asks its owner for shelter and spends the night there, hoping to see that maiden. The following morning, the prince notices his belongings have been moved and demands the houseowner give some explanation, or to show him the maiden from before. The house owner produces a banana stem ("কলার থোর", in the original), saying it his their daughter Kalavati, and warns that the prince must open it after passing by three waterfalls. Chota Kumar returns home and passes by two waterfalls, but, before reaching the third waterfall, he decides to rest under a banyan tree and open the banana stem: he finds the beautiful Kalavati Kanya inside it. He leaves her atop the tree, then goes to fetch water for her. However, a creature ("ডাইনী" 'dai'ni') also named Kalavati, who lives near the tree, says she wants to taste human flesh, devours the true Kalavati wholesale, save for two fingers which she pushes to the pond, takes her form and replaces her. The prince returns and takes the false Kalavati Kanya back home to introduce her to his sisters-in-law, who admire her beauty and concede defeat. (Note: Tripuri author Shobha Tripura collected a version of the tale, from Chittagong Hill Tracts, which ends at this part.)

In time, their domestic peace is threatened, since the false Kalavati Kanya begins to mistreat and argue with everyone, so Naran moves his cadet son and his wife to another house. Chota Kumar lives with the false bride and notices her gluttonous appetite for raw meat, which he provides for her (beef, pig, buffalo, and sheep). He goes to sleep and has a dream about the fountain where he left Kalavati Kanya: two golden fishes are calling for him. He goes to the fountain and finds the fishes like in his dream. He plays with them and feels his sadness dissipate. The false Kalavati spies on him. When he returns home, she says she feels she is pregnant and wishes to eat some fishes with rice. Chota Kumar suggests he can buy some from the market, but she wants the two from the fountain. The false bride goes to fetch them, but the fishes retreat in terror and muddy the waters, so she demands Chota Kumar cleans up the spring. The fishes are captured, brought home and cooked with some salt and saffron. Chota Kumar avoids eating the dish and keeps thinking of the lost fishes, then buries his dish in the garden. When he returns days later, he finds a gourd sapling. He makes a shelter for the plant with some bamboos and watches as the sapling grows. The gourd creeper plant grows and attaches itself to the side of his house, while the gourd becomes large enough and hits the false witch's head. One day, the false Kalavati suspects something about the gourd, but decides to pay a visit to her father to peer into a mirror. After she leaves, Chota Kumar feels his heart becoming lighter. In her absence, he brings the gourd to his room and sleeps. When he wakes up, the room is tidied up, the walls are painted, and the kitchen utensils are all washed. He decides to investigate, so he messes up his room and feigns sleep. The gourd falls to the ground and out comes Kalavati Kanya to do chores around his house, then returns to the gourd. The prince sees Kalavati, but questions her presence, since his wife is away, at her father's house. Once again, he messes up the house, pretends to be asleep and watches as Kalavati Kanya comes out of the gourd. He grabs her, but she begs to be released, since Chota Kumar is sleeping and living with a witch.

The true Kalavati Kanya explains that, after the prince left, the witch devoured her, then took on her form, and she went through the cycle of transformations. Kalavati tells that the witch returned to her father to peer into a mirror to discern Kalavati's true form, and warns that the witch will return and he must get rid of the creature, but she must be killed near the waterfall, for if a drop of her blood falls on the ground, the witch will revive. Kalavati Kanya also reveals that the frogs ("ব্যাঙাচি") at the fountain were forest animals that witnessed her misdeeds and were transformed. Thus, if the frogs drink up the witch's blood, but a drop falls onto the gourd, Kalavati Kanya can regain human form. She returns to vegetable form, and the prince makes preparations: he takes a kris from his father's house and sharpens it. The following morning, when the false Kalavati comes home, Chota Kumar tells her he wants to eat some with gourd curry, and invites her to accompany in catching some fish from the same pond. While the witch is distracted, he tries to knife her, but twice she sees him, which he dismisses as swatting away a fly and an ant. On the third time, the prince finally knifes the witch's neck, causing it to bleed. The sky trembles, and the frogs bid the prince shoves her into the fountain. He shoves her into the pond, and the frogs drink up her blood, returning to their true forms: birds like starlings ("শালিক"), doves ("ঘুঘু"), mynahs ("ময়না"), and tailorbirds ("টুনটুনি"), and animals like rabbits ("খরগোশ"), foxes ("শেয়াল"), sikus ("সিকু"), mongooses ("বেজি"), and deer ("হরিণ"), which all flee to the forest. Chota Kumar takes a remaining drop of blood and tosses it at the gourd, restoring Kalavati Kanya to human form. Chota Kumar reunites with his true bride and takes her home, where they enjoy her presence with a meal.

== See also ==
- The Pomegranate Fairy (Indian folktale)
- The Belbati Princess
- The Coconut Lady (Indian folktale)
- The Story of a Fairy and a Prince (Shan folktale)
