= The Coconut Lady =

Indian folktale from Rajasthan

The Coconut Lady is an Indian folktale collected in Rajasthan. The tale is a local form of tale type ATU 408, "The Love for Three Oranges", of the international Aarne-Thompson-Uther Index. As with The Three Oranges, the tale deals with a prince's search for a bride that lives in a fruit (a coconut), who is replaced by a false bride and goes through a cycle of incarnations, until she regains physical form again. Variants are known across India with other species of fruits.

== Sources ==
The tale was collected from a Rajasthani teller named Parvati, from Bassi, in the "Rajasthani dialect of Hindi".

== Summary ==
The youngest of seven princes, Prince Alok, wishes to have a wife for himself, since a wife prepares food best for their husband, and Alok is eating food prepared by his sisters-in-law. One day in his travels, he meets a sadhu and confides in him about his lack of a wife. The sadhu agrees to help the youth and advises him to bring a coconut from a coconut palm. Prince Alok finds a coconut palm and knocks down one fruit, then plans to get another one, but the first one jumps back into the palm. The prince returns empty-handed to the sadhu, who sends him again to get only one. This time, the prince obeys and brings the coconut, which the sadhu reveals will grant him a beautiful wife.

The prince returns home and stops by a potter's house to rest for the night. While he is asleep, the coconut turns into a beautiful lady with a red saree. The potter's wife, wanting to change her poor social status, admires the coconut lady and convinces her to trade clothes with her. The coconut lady does as asked, and the potter's wife drags her outside to drown her at a well, then takes her place, pretending to be the fruit maiden. Prince Alok wakes up and, on seeing the wrong woman, brings her to the palace with him. Back to the coconut lady, she goes through a cycle of transformations: a beautiful flower appears in the well, which the prince brings home with him. The false bride crushes its petals and throws it out the window, where an amaranthus tree sprouts. The false bride wishes to have its leaves used for food, and the cook prepares to roast them, but the leaves begin to talk. The cook, scared, gets rid of the leaves in the garden, where a coconut tree sprouts. A cattle-herding boy takes one of the coconuts with him; the lady springs out of it and is adopted by his mother.

One day, Alok's horse grazes near the cattle-herding family, and the Coconut Lady, instead of chasing the animal away, pets it, leaving an impression of a golden handprint. The horse returns to its master, and Alok, noticing the handprint, goes to the cattle-herders' house to verify it. There, he finds the Coconut Lady, beautiful as ever, who reveals the whole truth to him and asks him to punish the potter's wife, who took her place. Prince Alok immures the woman in the palace as her punishment and marries the Coconut Lady.

== Analysis ==
=== Tale type ===
The tale is classified in the international Aarne-Thompson-Uther Index as tale type ATU 408, "The Three Oranges". In the Indian variants, the protagonist goes in search of the fairy princess on his sisters-in-law's mocking, finds her and brings her home, but an ugly woman of low social standing kills and replaces her. The fairy princess, then, goes through a cycle of transformations until she regains physical form.

In an article in Enzyklopädie des Märchens, scholar Christine Shojaei Kawan separated the tale type into six sections, and stated that parts 3 to 5 represented the "core" of the story:

- (1) A prince is cursed by an old woman to seek the fruit princess.
- (2) The prince finds helpers who guide him to the princess's location;
- (3) The prince finds the fruits (usually three), releases the maidens inside, but only the third survives.
- (4) The prince leaves the princess up a tree near a spring or stream, and a slave or servant sees the princess's reflection in the water;
- (5) The slave or servant replaces the princess (transformation sequence);
- (6) The fruit princess and the prince reunite, and the false bride is punished.

=== Motifs ===
==== The maiden's appearance ====
According to the tale description in the international index, the maiden may appear out of the titular citrus fruits, like oranges and lemons. However, she may also come out of pomegranates or other species of fruits, and even eggs. In Stith Thompson and Jonas Balys's Oral Tales of India, this motif is indexed as "D211. Transformation: man to fruit".

==== The transformations and the false bride ====
The tale type is characterized by the substitution of the fairy wife for a false bride. The usual occurrence is when the false bride (a witch or a slave) sticks a magical pin into the maiden's head or hair and she becomes a dove. (Note: "The motif of a woman stabbed in her head with a pin occurs in AT 403 (in India) and in AT 408 (in the Middle East and southern Europe).") Christine Shojaei-Kawan notes that variants of Indian tradition lack the motif of the false bride mistaking the fruit maiden's reflection in the well for her own. Instead, generally in these tales the hero faints, and the fruit princess goes to fetch water to awaken him, when a girl of a lower caste notices the fruit princess and trades clothes with her, then drowns her in water.

In other variants, the maiden goes through a series of transformations after her liberation from the fruit and regains a physical body. (Note: As Hungarian-American scholar Linda Dégh put it, "(...) the Orange Maiden (AaTh 408) becomes a princess. She is killed repeatedly by the substitute wife's mother, but returns as a tree, a pot cover, a rosemary, or a dove, from which shape she seven times regains her human shape, as beautiful as she ever was".) In that regard, according to Christine Shojaei-Kawan's article, Christine Goldberg divided the tale type into two forms. In the first subtype, indexed as AaTh 408A, the fruit maiden suffers the cycle of metamorphosis (fish-tree-human) - a motif Goldberg locates "from the Middle East to Italy and France". In the second subtype, AaTh 408B, the girl is transformed into a dove by the needle. In this light, researcher Noriko Mayeda and Indologist W. Norman Brown noted that the fruit maiden "generally" goes from human to flower, then to tree, to fruit again, and finally regains human form.

== Variants ==
=== India ===
While organizing the Indic index, Stith Thompson and Warren Roberts noted the close proximity between types 403, "The Black and the White Bride", and 408, "The Three Oranges" - types that deal with the theme of the "Substituted Bride". To better differentiate between them, both scholars remarked that the heroine must be replaced by a female antagonist who is unrelated to her. Thompson's second revision of the international type index listed 17 variants of tale type 408 in India and South Asia. In some of the Indian tales, the heroine does not come out of a fruit, but she is still replaced by the false bride and goes through a cycle of transformations. Despite this, these stories are indexed as the same tale type.

==== The Invisible Woman ====
Zacharias P. Thundy published a tale from Kadar that he titled The Invisible Woman. In this tale, the titular invisible woman is a beautiful princess born from a coconut, desired by many men as their bride. Two Pulaya youths in Eastern India grow up together. One day, their father asks them questions: what moonlight is and what it is good for. The older one says it is milk, and a period good for working, while the younger says it is light reflected by the sun, and a good period to tell stories and to marry the invisible coconut princess. For his answers, the father expels the younger one from home, for he prefers his sons to be workers, not chasing impossible dreams. The younger Pulaya youth leaves home and walks towards the east, until he reaches the house of the old lady who provides flowers and garlands for the invisible princess, who eats her food. The old lady also casts spells on those who cross her path. One day, the Pulaya youth helps the old woman in separating the flowers to prepare garlands. The old woman then says the youth is destined to marry the invisible princess and takes him to the house where she lives. However, they cannot find the princess anywhere, and the house servants do not know anything. Then, Shiva appears to the youth, gives him a clay jar and a bamboo stick, and instructs him to reach a palm tree and circle it seven times, for the tree will bend for him to reach the fruit, which he is not to open. The Pulaya youth follows Shiva's instructions and plucks the coconut and walks towards home. On the way, he begins to feel thirsty and plans to open the fruit and drink its liquid, but resists. Suddenly, the coconut opens and out comes the princess. The Pulaya youth kneels in worship of her, but she has none of it, and both exchange marriage vows, then the youth falls asleep. A couple named Ilayandi and Ilyandichi appear, their female half wanting the youth for herself. The coconut princess asks the couple where she can find water, and the woman, named Ilyandichi, takes the princess to a well. She asks the princess to trade her garments and jewels with her, then drowns the princess in the well. She reneges on her husband, Ilayandi, then takes the princess's place beside the youth. The Pulaya youth wakes up and finds the ugly lady near him, who he knows is not the coconut princess, but decides to accompany her to her house. As for the true coconut princess, she becomes a sunflower in the well, which the Pulaya youth brings home. The false bride tears it apart; where the petals fall, a lettuce sprouts, which she tries to cook, but she hears a cry inside the pot and decides to bury it. A mango tree sprouts where the pot is buried. The Pulaya youth sleeps near the mango tree, and it yields a fruit. Later, while he leaves on a hunt, the false bride plucks the fruit and cuts down the tree; a baby girl comes out of the fruit, and the house servants want to raise her. Ilyandichi says the girl is a devil's child and kills her for her blood to cure her migraines. From the girl's grave, a coconut tree sprouts. The Pulaya youth finds the coconut tree and redoes the ritual he did previously (circling the tree seven times with the clay jar and bamboo stick), and the tree bends to allow him access to the fruit, then returns to its former position. The Pulaya youth returns home with the coconut, to the mockery of his relatives. However, the youth places the fruit on the ground, and out comes the true coconut princess. His relatives marvel and her beauty and kneel down in worship of her. As she walks to her bridegroom's house, rice sprouts with every step. A wedding pandal appears before the house, the coconut princess sprinkles water on the people, waving the wand, and marries the Pulaya youth.

==== The Coconut Fairy ====
In a Tai Khamti tale from Arunachal Pradesh with the title The Coconut Fairy, a hardworking farmer couple are blessed by the gods, who send them an angel to be their human son, whom they name Chow Malakungini. As a boy, he listens to his grandmother's stories about fairies and becomes obsessed with finding one. When he reaches marriageable age, his parents present him girls from the village as suitable brides, but he will have none but a fairy, so he decides to journey for his fairy bride. He meets a sage on the way who advises him to always walk straight ahead and never stray from the path. Chow Malakungini traverses a thorny path and reaches another sage. The second sage says the youth can find the fairy inside a coconut if he continues on his path, but he should wait for the fruit to ripen before he plucks it. The sage gives him some food, water and a change of clothes, and Chow Malakungini walks until he reaches a garden where a single coconut tree grows, surrounded by many Phephais. After the Phephais eat and quarrel among themselves, he watches as the creatures fall asleep with the sunrise, and creeps towards the coconut to pluck the fruit. Inside the coconut, the fairy says she is not ready to be plucked, but Chow Malakungini decides to take the fruit with him. At a distance, he cracks open the coconut, and out comes a beautiful fairy. The girl says if the coconut was ripe, she would have her kingdom and jewels with her, but the youth says he has no need of those. The coconut fairy explains the Phephais (demons) were guarding her to offer her as bride to their master when the coconut ripened. Chow Malakungini takes the fairy with him back to his home village, but she feels tired and wishes to rest. The youth agrees to let her rest, and places her on a bush near a stream, while he goes to bring his family and friends to better welcome her. While he goes away, a wicked forest woman, who wants to marry Chow Malakungini, steals the fairy's clothes, shoves her down the river, and takes the fairy's place on the bush. Chow Malakungini returns with his family to the fairy and notices she does not look like the girl he released from the fruit. Still, Chow Malakungini takes the woman to marry. The coconut fairy, who has turned into a little sparrow, follows after the wedding procession and watches as the Chow Chere (the religious celebrant) ties a sacred thread around the false bride and Chow Malakungini's wrists. The coconut fairy, as the sparrow, tries to approach the youth to reveal the truth, and one day, while he is alone, she sings how Chow Malakungini has been tricked and married an ugly woman, while the real coconut fairy died in the water. On hearing this, Chow Malakungini discovers he has been deceived, and confronts the false wife. After she admits to her deception, she is cast in a barrel down the river. The coconut fairy, as the sparrow, flies away and is never seen again.

==== The Daughter of the Sun ====
In a tale collected from a Bishnupriya Manipuri source with the title The Daughter of the Sun, a village woman is childless and is taunted by the villagers. She prays to the Sun every morning and offers tulsi plants and water in her devotion. Time passes; the Sun takes pity on the woman in her old age and makes her become pregnant. After her husband dies, the old woman gives birth to a girl she names Belirajar Jilok ("Daughter of the Sun"), whom she keeps inside a coconut during the day to protect from the sun's rays, but releases at night. The Daughter of the Sun grows up, and her mother decides to move out to the jungle to hide her. Eventually, the prince of the country learns of the beauty, dons a beggar disguise and goes to the old woman's house to look for shelter. The old woman tries to shoo him away, but the prince, as the beggar, insists so much, she allows him to spend the night on her porch. During the night, he stays awake and sees the old woman releasing her beautiful daughter from the coconut. The following morning, the prince tells the old woman he saw her daughter, more beautiful than he imagined, and wishes to marry her, promising to protect her. The old woman says her daughter is too tender for sunlight, but the prince insists so much. The old woman performs a Gandharva marriage between the prince and her daughter, and gives the prince the coconut where she hides her daughter, advising him to only open it when he reaches the palace, at night. The prince departs, but, en route to his palace, he decides to open up the coconut on the road under a banyan tree. The Daughter of the Sun leaves the coconut shell, admonishes the prince for not following her mother's advice, since she cannot be under the sun's heat, and feels thirsty. The prince is also thirsty, and sends the Daughter of the Sun to a nearby river. The Daughter of the Sun goes to drink water in the river, when a fisher-woman sees her, kills her, dons her garments and ornaments, and goes to meet the prince. The false girl gives water to the prince, who notices she is not his bride due to her ugliness. The fisher-woman feigns being offended and lies that the heat of the Sun made her ugly, but she will regain her beauty in the following days. The prince believes her and takes her home through the river, where he also finds a blooming water-lily he brings home with him and keeps in the coconut shell. Back home, the prince is mocked for marrying an ugly bride. The king learns of this and orders a house built away from the palace, where the prince and the false bride move out. The prince is sad, and sleeps with the water-lily near his pillow. When he wakes up, he finds the house cleaned up and senses someone fed him during the night. This goes on for some days, until the prince wakes up and sees the Daughter of the Sun alive and offering him food. The prince is glad his bride is there with him, and she retells him how the fisher-woman killed her and she became a water-lily due to the Sun God. The prince orders the false bride banished to the jungle and buried alive in a hole. The Daughter of the Sun's old mother is brought to live with them.

==== The Areca-Nut Princess ====
In a Kannada tale from Karnatak translated as Areca-Nut Princess or The Arecanut Princess, a king has five sons, four of them married save the youngest, who rejects his prospective brides and travels to find the Areca-nut king's daughter. On his journeys, he meets three saints who each gifts him a lemon, a stick, coal and a turmeric. They also warn him not to place the areca nut on the ground. The prince reaches the garden of the Areca-nut king's tree, plucks an areca nut (inside of which the princess is). However, the garden is protected by guardians: a Rakshasa (at which he throws the lemon to defeat it), and lions, tigers and all manners of creatures. The animals attack and kill the prince. The third saint goes to the garden to rescue and revive the prince, and gifts him the same objects as before. The revived prince throws the objects at the animals of the garden, plucks the arecanut and rushes back. He stops at the edge of a city and sleeps beside a well. When he dozes off, the nut falls to the ground and releases the Arecanut Princess. At the same time, a lowly Kumbara girl is fetching water, when she sights the Arecanut Princess, changes clothes and jewels with her, and shoves her down a well, then enters the areca nut. The prince wakes up and takes the nut back to his palace, and lives with the false princess. Meanwhile, the true princess survives and goes through a cycle of reincarnations: she becomes a flower in the well which the prince takes home. The false bride recognizes it as a form of the princess and buries it; a sandalwood tree sprouts, which the false bride wants chopped down and burnt down. The woodcutter fulfills the orders and cuts it down, but bring home with him a piece of the sandalwood tree. In the woodcutter's house, the Arecanut Princess comes out of the piece of wood, is discovered and adopted by the woodcutter. Some time later, the prince goes on a hunt and eavesdrops some girls commenting on the story of the Arecanut Princess. On hearing this, the prince learns of the whole truth, punishes the false bride and marries the true Arecanut Princess. According to folklorist Jawaharlal Handoo, the tale was provided by a researcher from Mysore University, and is "widespread in South Karnataka, Tamil Nadu and Kerala".

==== Story of a King ====
In a Kannada tale titled "ದೊರೆ ಕಥೆ" ("Dore Kathe", or "Story of a King"), collected by folklorist H. L. Nagegowda from a source named Basamma in Karnataka, a king has five sons, the elder four already married, save for the youngest. The cadet prince is brought potential brides for him, but he declines every one of them, wishing to find a bride for himself. Thus, he rides a horse to another land. On the road, the meets a sage (swami) in meditation and decides to clean up the sage's hut and cook him rice. The swami spots the prince and is told he is looking for the Areca King's daughter ("ಅಡಕರಾಯನ ಮಗ್ಳು", in the original; "Aḍakarāyana magḷu"). The swami directs the prince to a second sage, to whom he cooks some rice and also tells he wishes to marry the Areca King's daughter, Adakarambhe ("ಅಡಕರಂಭೇ" 'aḍakarambhē', in the original). The second sage mentions the impossibility of the mission, but he still directs the prince to yet a third sage. The third sage is convinced to help the prince and gives the youth three lemons and instructions: the heavenly deities will come to dance and frolic in the water next to an areca tree; the prince is to place the lemons inside a tree, wait for the areca nut to bend, fetch an areca nut and rush back. The prince does as instructed and rushes back with an arecanut, then is transformed into a lizard by the third swami to hide him from the guardians of the garden. The creatures appear at the swami's hut and ask to investigate it, but, on finding nothing, depart. After the pursuers leave, the swami restores the prince to human form and advises him to only open the arecanut at home. The prince pays the swami and makes a return home, rewarding the other two. Meanwhile, some potters come to fetch water from a wellspring, and hear news of the prince bringing a girl from the arecanut. The prince stops by the well and falls asleep. The arecanut he has on him drops to the ground and releases a beautiful maiden. A potter girl spots her and asks her to fetch some water, but the arecanut maiden says she does not want to disturb the prince, who is asleep on her lap. Still, the potter girl convinces her to trade clothes and to look at their reflections in the well, then shoves the arecanut maiden inside the well. The prince brings the false bride home, but she is recognized as a local village potter. In the next morning, the prince goes on a hunt and finds a building next to the well: the arecanut maiden's two hands became two banana trees, her two legs became pillars, and her eyes two parrots. The birds begin to talk to each other and tell the story of the prince, his quest for the arecanut maiden, and the potter girl as the prince's false bride. The prince overhears the tale, returns to the village to get rid of the false bride, and reunites with the arecanut maiden. They marry.

== See also ==
- The Belbati Princess
- The Pomegranate Fairy (Indian folktale)
- The Story of a Fairy and a Prince (Shan folktale)
- The Princess from the Fruit
