= The Belbati Princess =

Indian folktale collected by Cecil Henry Bompas

The Belbati Princess is an Indian folktale, from the Ho people in Eastern India, collected by Cecil Henry Bompas. The tale is a local form of the tale "The Love for Three Oranges", which is classified as type ATU 408 of the international Aarne-Thompson-Uther Index (ATU). As with The Three Oranges, the tale deals with a prince's search for a bride that lives in a fruit (a bel-fruit), who is replaced by a false bride and goes through a cycle of incarnations until she regains physical form again. Variants are known across India with other species of fruits.

== Sources ==
Author Cecil Henry Bompas collected the tale from a Ho source in Santal Parganas. According to Indian anthropologist Sarat Chandra Roy, the tale was "current among the Hos of Singbhum". In another line of scholarship, the tale is said to resemble tales of Bengal's "cultural orbit", and its appearance in the "tribal belt" is "somewhat unexpected". The tale was also republished and sourced from Bihar.

== Summary ==
In this tale, six of seven brothers are married, save for the youngest, Lita. He will marry no one save for the Belbati Princess. His sisters-in-law mock him for it, but he leaves to find her. He meets three holy muni who direct him to a garden with rakshasas that guard the bel tree with the fruit that holds the princess. The third muni warns him the he must seek the biggest bel fruit.

Lita enters the garden and steals one of the smaller ones; the Rakshasas gang up on him and devour the boy. The muni sends a crow to find him, and bids the bird brings the Rakshasas' excrement to the muni. The holy man revives Lita and turns him into a parakeet; Lita flies to the garden, steals the fruit, and returns to the muni, who tells him to open the fruit only by a certain well. In a hurry, Lita rushes to the well and falls to the ground, accidentally cracking open the bel fruit. The Belbati Princess comes out of the fruit in a blaze of light that kills Lita. The princess asks a passing girl of the Kamar caste (from the blacksmith caste, in another translation) for some water to revive him. The Kamar girl, cunningly, says she cannot reach the water in the well, and the princess says she will do it herself. The Kamar girl then complains she will not stand by the boy's corpse, and the Belbati princess gives her clothes to the girl as a pledge. Seizing the opportunity, the Kamar girl shoves the princess into the well, revives Lita with some water, pretends to be the princess and marries him.

Later, while hunting with his brothers, Lita stops near the same well and finds a beautiful flower inside. He takes it home, but the false princess cuts off its petals; where the petals land, a bel tree sprouts. Later, Lita's horse rushes off to the new bel tree, and a fruit falls on its saddle. Lita brings the fruit home and opens it, releasing a girl. Lita lets the girl live with them, but the false Princess feigns illness and accuses the new girl of sorcery, wanting to have her killed. Lita fulfills her wishes and delivers the Belbati girl to four Ghasis to be killed. As a last request, the girl asks for her hands and feet to be cut off and placed on the four corners of her grave. It happens thus, and a palace appears.

At the end of the tale, Lita goes on a hunt and stops to rest at the mysterious palace, where two birds are talking to each other about the story of the Belbati Princess, who comes to the palace every six months. The first time, Lita fails to hold her; the next time, he secures her. He marries the true Belbati Princess and punishes the Kamarin girl.

== Analysis ==
=== Tale type ===
The tale is classified in the international Aarne-Thompson-Uther Index as tale type ATU 408, "The Three Oranges". In the Indian variants, the protagonist goes in search of the fairy princess on his sisters-in-law's mocking, finds her and brings her home, but an ugly woman of low social standing kills and replaces her. The fairy princess, then, goes through a cycle of transformations until she regains physical form.

In an article in Enzyklopädie des Märchens, scholar Christine Shojaei Kawan separated the tale type into six sections, and stated that parts 3 to 5 represented the "core" of the story:

- (1) A prince is cursed by an old woman to seek the fruit princess;
- (2) The prince finds helpers that guide him to the princess's location;
- (3) The prince finds the fruits (usually three), releases the maidens inside, but only the third survives;
- (4) The prince leaves the princess up a tree near a spring or stream, and a slave or servant sees the princess's reflection in the water;
- (5) The slave or servant replaces the princess (transformation sequence);
- (6) The fruit princess and the prince reunite, and the false bride is punished.

=== Motifs ===
==== The maiden's appearance ====
According to the tale description in the international index, the maiden may appear out of the titular citrus fruits, like oranges and lemons. However, she may also come out of pomegranates or other species of fruits, and even eggs. In Stith Thompson and Jonas Balys's Oral Tales of India, this motif is indexed as "D211. Transformation: man to fruit". More specific motifs to the story include "D431.6.1.2. Woman emerges from fruit" and "T543.3. Birth from fruit".

==== The transformations and the false bride ====
The tale type is characterized by the substitution of the fairy wife for a false bride. The usual occurrence is when the false bride (a witch or a slave) sticks a magical pin into the maiden's head or hair and she becomes a dove. (Note: "The motif of a woman stabbed in her head with a pin occurs in AT 403 (in India) and in AT 408 (in the Middle East and southern Europe).") Christine Shojaei-Kawan notes that variants of Indian tradition lack the motif of the false bride mistaking the fruit maiden's reflection in the well for her own. Instead, generally in these tales the hero faints and the fruit princess goes to fetch water to awake him, when a girl of lower caste notices the fruit princess and trades clothes with her, then drowns her in water.

In other variants, the maiden goes through a series of transformations after her liberation from the fruit and regains a physical body. (Note: As Hungarian-American scholar Linda Dégh put it, "(...) the Orange Maiden (AaTh 408) becomes a princess. She is killed repeatedly by the substitute wife's mother, but returns as a tree, a pot cover, a rosemary, or a dove, from which shape she seven times regains her human shape, as beautiful as she ever was".) In that regard, according to Christine Shojaei-Kawan's article, Christine Goldberg divided the tale type into two forms. In the first subtype, indexed as AaTh 408A, the fruit maiden suffers the cycle of metamorphosis (fish-tree-human) - a motif Goldberg locates "from the Middle East to Italy and France". In the second subtype, AaTh 408B, the girl is transformed into a dove by the needle. In this light, researcher Noriko Mayeda and Indologist W. Norman Brown noted that the fruit maiden "generally" goes from human to flower, then to tree, to fruit again, and finally regains human form.

In addition, in Indian variants, after a cycle of transformations into a flower and a tree, the false wife orders the fruit maiden's execution. The fruit maiden's body parts then form a palace for her to dwell and two birds that repeat her story to the prince.

== Variants ==
=== India ===
While organizing the Indic index, Stith Thompson and Warren Roberts noted the close proximity between types 403, "The Black and the White Bride", and 408, "The Three Oranges" - types that deal with the theme of the "Substituted Bride". To better differentiate between them, both scholars remarked that the heroine must be replaced by a female antagonist that is unrelated to her. Thompson's second revision of the international type index listed 17 variants of tale type 408 in India and South Asia.

Examples of stories that lack the heroine's birth from the fruit, but keep the cycle of transformations, include Indian tales Phúlmati Rání, The Apple Princess and Raní Jhajhaní (or Rani Jajhani), and Sri Lankan The Maehiyallē-gama Princess. Other tales of the same narrative encompass Sema Naga stories Muchüpile and Tseipu and Kawulipu, Lhota Naga Hunchibili, (Note: In a footnote, Hutton stated that the tale Hunchibili was from the Lhotas, but versions of it existed among the Angami Nagas and the Semas.) Zeme Kirumbe, Mizo story Tumchhingi leh Raldawna ("The Story of Tumchhingi & Raldawna" or "Raldawana and Tumchingi"), Thadou Kuki Ashijoul or Ahsijolneng, Lushai The Story of Tlumtea and his Brothers (Note: The tale is also called Vanchungnula or Vanchungnula (The maiden of heaven).) and Khasi A Tale of the Takalong Cucumber.

==== The Bél-Princess ====
In the tale The Bél-Princess, collected by Maive Stokes, a king has six married sons and a cadet still single. The seventh prince dislikes his sisters-in-law, who, in retaliation, say he wants to marry a "Bél-Princess". On hearing this, the prince decides to look for her. On his journey, he meets a sleeping fakir whom he takes care and grooms for six months. After the fakir wakes up, the fakir thanks the prince and helps him in getting to the Bél-Princess: she lives in a bel-fruit in a tree in a garden guarded by demons in the fairies' country; and gives him the means to enter the garden unnoticed, warning him to get the fruit and not look back. The prince goes to the garden to steal the fruit, but looks back and turns to stone. Back to the fakir, he notices the prince's absence after a week and goes to look for him at the garden, restoring him to life. The prince enters the garden again and takes the fruit with him, which leads to the garden's guardians to chase him. The fakir turns him into a fly to hide from the fairies and demons, then sends him on his way with a warning: open the fruit only at home, not on the road. The prince journeys back home, but stops to rest near a well in his father's garden, and opens the bel-fruit: the Bél-Princess appears before him and he faints at her beauty. A wicked woman appears to fetch water and sights the Bél-Princess, whom she trades clothes and jewels and shoves her down a well, then takes her place by the prince's side. The prince wakes up and, upon seeing the wicked woman in the Bél-Princess's clothes, takes her as his bride to the palace. Back to the true Bél-Princess, she goes through a cycle of incarnations: she turns into a pink lotus-flower inside the well which only the prince can fetch; he brings it home, but the false bride throws it outside in the garden; a bel-fruit tree sprouts with a large fruit that only the prince can pluck. The false bride finds the fruit on the table and throws it away. The bel-fruit reveals a girl the poor gardener's family adopts and raises as their own. Seven years later, the false bride's cow eats the orchard the gardener's daughter (the reincarnated Bél-Princess) shoos it away. For this, the false bride orders the girl's execution. Two executioners take the girl to the jungle to kill her, but, on seeing her beauty, feel pity for her and decide to spare her. However, the girl takes one of their knives and cuts out her organs: her eyes become a parrot and a mainá bird), her heart becomes a tank, and her body parts become a palace in the jungle, her head its dome, and her arms and legs the pillars of its verandah. Time passes; the prince goes on a hunt and passes by the uninhabited palace that appeared in the jungle, and spends the night on the palace verandah. Suddenly, the parrot and the mynah being to talk to each other about the prince's story, and stop their conversation at a certain point. For the next days, the prince returns to the palace to overhear the birds' conversation and learns of the fate of the true Bél-Princess and how he can see her again: open every room of the palace, reach the center, lift a trap door and descend the stairs to an underground palace, where she is located. The following day, he follows the parrot's instructions and reaches the underground palace, where he finds the revived Bél-Princess. He reveals the situation to her, how the birds told everything, and tells her he will tell his parents about his true bride. The prince returns home and wants to bring everyone to the palace in the forest for his marriage to the Bél-Princess. The king orders the execution of the false bride, and the royal family joins the prince for their marriage to the true Bél-Princess. According to Stokes, the tale was provided by an ayah named Múniyá, an old woman from Calcutta. Richard McGillivray Dawkins remarked that both The Belbati Princess and The Bél-Princess are "near relatives" of Italian tale The Three Citrons.

==== The Marriage of Bael Kaniya ====
Ethnologist Verrier Elwin collected a tale from the Ghotul Pata, Bandopal, from North Bastar State, with the title The Marriage of Bael Kaniya. In this tale, the wife of a Muria Raja spends time with her brother-in-law, the raja's younger brother, until one day they quarrel. The younger brother leaves home and travels to another country where a woman named Jal-Kaniya lives with her Rakshasa husband. Jal-Kaniya's sister, Bael-Kaniya, lives in a bel-fruit in a garden protected by tigers, bears and snakes. The young prince greets Jal-Kaniya and announces he wishes to marry Bael-Kaniya, but is warned of the dangers that lie ahead in his journey. Jal-Kaniya then hides the youth from her Rakshasa husband, for fear of him devouring the human. The Rakshasa husband comes and senses a human smell, then Jal-Kaniya shows him the prince. By his nature, the Rakshasa opens his mouth to devour the boy, when the chelik shrinks himself, enters the Rakshasa's mouth and cuts him open from the inside. Jal-Kaniya laments her husband's death, for he was the only one that could help the prince reach the garden where Bael-Kaniya lives. The chelik revives the Rakshasa and they journey to the garden with provisions to distract its guardians (a tiger, a bear and a snake). The Rakshasa plucks Bael-Kaniya's fruit and brings it to the prince, advising him to open it when he returns home. On the road, after three days, the prince decides to open the bel-fruit and stops by a tank: a motiari appears from the fruit and combs his hair. She goes to cook some food for him, and he is fast asleep. The tale then explains the tank is where cheliks and motiaris of Tarbhum (the underworld) come to dance and fetch water. The Tarbhum chelik finds the Bael-Kaniya and goes to report to his monarchs, then comes back to kidnap the fruit maiden and bring her to Tarbhum. The tale then continues as another tale type: the human prince starts a journey to the underworld to rescue Bael-Kaniya. Georgy A. Zograf translated the tale to Russian as "Женитьба на Бэл-кании" ("Marriage to Bel-Kaniya"). According to Zograf, the heroine's name, "Bael-Kaniya", translates to "the girl from the bel tree".

==== The Story of the Girl Belavati ====
In an Orissan tale collected by author Upendra Narayan Dutta Gupta with the title The Story of the Girl Belavati, a king's only son departs to find a wife. On the road, he meets a Kamaruni (one from the blacksmith caste) girl who warns him about an Apuja (unpropitiated) goddess that may kill him. The prince journeys on and meets the bloodthirsty Thakurani goddess, who wants to devour the youth, but, on seeing him on a horse, she stops, since the animal is her favourite Vahana (mount). The goddess sends him with a boon: she instructs to reach Asura country, sweep the Asuras' houses and prepare dishes of rice and curry to earn their favour. The prince does as the goddess instructed him and earns the Asuras' favour. After a while, the prince, in return for his deeds, asks for Belavati. One of the Asuras gives him a bael fruit, which is to be opened only at the prince's home. The prince rides back home, but stops by a well and opens the fruit, releasing a dazzlingly beautiful maiden. The prince faints at her sight, and Belavati tries to wake him up. Suddenly, a Kundabhusundi (fat ugly woman; 'she-demon', in another translation) woman appears, beats the fruit maiden to death and throws her body into the well, then puts on her clothes to pass herself as Belavati. The prince wakes up, sees the ugly woman beside him and thinks she is the girl from the fruit, then takes her home. As for the true Belavati, she goes through a cycle of incarnations: two Padma (lotus) flowers inside the well that a gardener (Mali) takes to the prince, then a bael tree. The gardener plucks a fruit from the tree and brings it home to his wife. They try to open it, but a voice inside the fruit begs to be cut in a certain way, for she is Belavati who wishes to become their adopted daughter and bring them wealth. It happens thus, and the family's fortune increases. One day, the false bride notices Belavati is alive when the girl goes to make ablutions in a tank, and lies that the girl made faces at her, and for this she must be punished. The king attends the false bride's request and orders the death of the gardener's daughter. The following morning, a temple to Mahadeva (Mahadeb, in another translation; both referring to Shiva) sprouts in the place where the girl was executed. The king sends a Brahman to make the Puja to the deity and bring him a bael-leaf. One day, the Brahman overhears a pair of birds (Sua, a parrot, and Sari, another type of talking bird) conversing about the prince, Belavati, and the false bride. The Brahman writes their tale in the walls of the temple, and listens closely to the birds' conversation: in order to restore the true Belavati, the king is to offer himself before the temple with a piece of straw between his teeth and a straw rope around his neck, and ask for forgiveness. The king is informed by the Brahman and goes to the temple to prostrate himself before the God. By doing so, Belavati reappears before the king. The king then takes her home to marry his son, and executes the Kundabhusundi. The tale is also known as The Story of Belabati (Belabati katha) and The Girl inside the Bel Fruit.

==== Belkumari (Vindhya) ====
In an Indian tale from Vindhya Pradesh with the title "बेलकुमारी" ("Belkumari" or "Bel Princess"), Chuk Raja has seven sons, the youngest, Ku War, still unmarried. His sisters-in-law bless him to find "Belkumari". Ku War asks where he can find this "Belkumari", and one of his sisters-in-law points him to a forest beyond seven rivers, and Belkumari lives in the lake. Ku War rides to the lake and finds a hermit's hut. The hermit (muni) asks the reason for his presence there, and he says he is looking for Belkumari. The hermit says he can find her in the bel tree on the little island guarded by rakshasas (demons), and advises him to swim to the island, release the goat tied to the tree to distract the rakshasas and steal the fruit. Ku War does as instructed, steals the bel fruit while the guardians are distracted devouring the goat and brings the fruit to the muni, who advises the prince to open it only at home. Ku War goes back home, but stops to rest by a beautiful lake. Doubting the muni's words, he opens the bel fruit near the lake: the beautiful Belkumari appears to him. He says he is tired and rests on Belkumari's lap. Meanwhile, a blacksmith's daughter comes to the lake (ghat) and find the couple there. Belkumari explains they are to be married to each other, and the blacksmith's daughter feigns helplessness and asks for the princess's help in drawing water from the ghat. Belkumari leaves to fetch water for the blacksmith's daughter, who follows her and shoves her into the ghat to drown, while she takes her place besides the prince. Ku War wakes up and notices the princess does not resemble the previous girl, and believes this is because he disobeyed the muni. Still, he takes her as his bride. Some time later, the seven princes go on a hunt, and Ku War discovers a sweet-smelling giant lotus flower in the ghat, which he brings back home, despite his brothers' objections. One day, while Ku War is away, the blacksmith's daughter throws the lotus away; where it falls, a tree sprouts. The Mali (gardener) plucks its fruit, brings it home and cuts it open, releasing a girl he adopts. The false bride learns of this, feigns illness and asks to bathe in the gardener's daughter's blood to be cured. The prince orders the girl to be killed and her blood to be delivered to his bride. The gardener mourns for the loss of his daughter and buries her. A bel tree springs from her grave. Some time later, the prince meets a sadhu, who notices the prince's sadness and learns of his predicament. The sadhu gives the prince a ring with which he can listen to the talk of the birds. The prince goes to the garden and begins to listen to the conversation between two pigeons ("कबूतर", in the original), who mock the prince for foolishly falling for the blacksmith's girl's ruse. The prince bids the pigeons tell him the whole story: they reveal the blacksmith's ruse and say the real Belkumari can be found inside the fruit hanging from the bel tree. Ku War cuts open the bel fruit and releases Belkumari again. They return to the palace and the false bride realizes her rival is alive. The prince moves to kill the false wife, but Belkumari intervenes on her behalf to be spared. She is sent home, and Belkumari marries the prince.

==== The King and the Bael Girl ====
Indian author Harihar Vaishnav published a tale from Bastar titled "राजा और बेल कन्या" ("The King and the Bael Girl"). In this tale, a king suffers for lack of a wife and lack of an heir, since everytime he takes a wife, she dies to illness or in childbirth. In addition, no family agrees to give him their daughters for bride, for fear of losing them. Eventually, the king finds a young bride to marry. They live happily for a while and she becomes pregnant, but the king worries for both mother and child. The king's fears are confirmed, as the queen dies in childbirth with their child. Devastated, the king places the minister to rule in his stead, dons a sage apparel, and leaves the palace to live a life of abdication and penance. He goes to meditate under a bael tree for years. On one occasion, he prays to Bhagavan about his wish to have a wife and son, and Bhagavan advises him to pluck a fruit from the bael tree and open it. The king does as the deity instructed and returns to his kingdom. He stops by a well on the border of his kingdom to sate his thirst and cuts open the fruit: out comes a beautiful girl, and they fall in love with each other. He tells her to wait for him there while he goes to bring back a retinue to welcome her as his queen. After he leaves, a girl named Jamadarin discovers the Bael Girl and talks to her, they trade clothes and jewellery and she shoves the Bael Girl down the well, then waits for the king. The monarch returns with a retinue and notices his bride looks dark-skinned now, and the Jamadarin lies that the sun darkened her skin. Still, the king takes her as his queen, but still cannot have an heir. As for the true Bael Girl, she becomes a lotus flower in the well. People try to collect it, but only the monarch is able to: he brings it home and places it next to his bed. The Jamadarin suspects the flower is the Bael Girl and tosses it away in the garden, then lies to the king the flower withered. On the place the flower fell, a vegetable sprouts which the king also brings home with him. The Jamadarin orders a cook to boil the vegetable. It happens thus and she throws it away. A bael tree begins to grow where the boiled vegetables fell, and yields many bel fruits. The king plucks one of the fruits, opens it and out comes the Bael Girl, the same one he met by the well. The king is puzzled: if the real Bael Girl has just come out of the fruit, then who is the one he married? The Bael Girl explains the king married an impostor who took the Bael Girl's clothes and jewels, threw her down the well and tried to destroy her many times when the Bael Girl went through a cycle of transformations. The king executes the Jamadarin and makes the Bael Girl his queen.

==== Belpatri Rani ====
In a North Indian tale titled "बेलपत्री रानी" ("Belpatri Rani"), a moneylender ("साहूकार", in the original) has seven sons who work together. He marries his six elder sons, save for the youngest, Chandar. One day, the man falls ill and nominates his firstborn as the next head of the family, then dies. They also look after the young Chandar, but dote and spoil him. One day, due to his behaviour, his sisters-in-law mock him about him finding the Belpatri Rani. Moved by their words, he goes out to the verandah and walks up to a well, then falls asleep. A pari appears in his dreams and directs him to a sadhu. Chandar wakes up and decides to start a journey to find this sadhu. After a long while, he reaches a river. Next to the river, the sadhu lies in meditation under a banyan tree, spots the youth and exhorts him to leave, lest he burns the stranger to ashes. Chandar begs the sadhu to help him find Belpatri Rani, and the sadhu reveals there is a bael tree on the other side of the lake, from where many bel fruits fall, generating Belpatris that come to dance at night; they protect Belpatri Rani from prying eyes, but whoever sights her is reduced to ashes. The youth is resolute in finding Belpatri Rani, and the sadhu turns him into a parrot, for him to fly up to the bael tree, steal a fruit and fly back to him, without looking behind. It happens thus, and Chandar, in parrot form, flies to the tree and perches on a branch. As the Belpatri Ranis appear to frolic in the water, a fruit falls from the tree, which Chandar fetches in his beak and rushes back to the sadhu. One of the Ranis hears a branch cracking, notices the bird and calls for her sisters to chase it, causing a great noise. Chandar looks behind him and is fulminated, leaving the Ranis to grab the fruit. One of the Ranis tells the sadhu they will turn the thief's family to ashes, and the sadhu says the Ranis have taken their revenge. With this, the Ranis return to the tree, while the sadhu revives Chandar from the pile of ashes, warning him to be more careful. Chandar turns into a green parrot, hides amidst the leaves, steals another fruit and flies back to the sadhu, the Ranis chasing after him. The sadhu turns him into a fly to trick the Ranis, and invites them to check on his hut. The Ranis find nothing, and quickly make a turn for the tree, lest the sunrays burn them to ashes. The sadhu restores Chandar to human form when the maidens leave, advising him to go back home and never return. Chandar returns home and stops by the same well, then rests for a while. In the morning, the bael fruit opens on its own, a Belpatri Rani emerges and places Chandar's head on her lap. Suddenly, a Jamadarin appears and talks to the Belpatri Rani, learns everything, and decides to get rid of her rival: she convinces her to trade clothes and see their reflections in the well; she then shoves the Belpatri into the well and takes her place next to Chandar. The youth wakes, notices the bale fruit is cracked in two, and surmises the girl beside him is the Belpatri Rani, but her face is ugly. Still, he takes the Jamadarin to his palace and marries her, and is mocked by his sisters-in-law. One day, he goes to drink water from the well and finds a lotus flower he brings home with him. The Jamadarin throws it out the window; amaranth vegetables grow where it fell. The Jamadarin decides to cook the plant, when it begins to reveal her ruse from inside the pan. She throws the vegetables away; from them springs another bael tree. Chandar finds the bael tree and decides to guard it. One night, a bael fruit falls from it, which he brings home. At night, Belpatri Rani comes out of the fruit. Chandar finds her again and they talk. He learns of the whole truth, and introduces Belpatri Rani to his sisters-in-law, who admire the fruit maiden's beauty.

==== Princess Belmanti ====
In an Indian tale in the Magahi language collected by Ramprasad Singh with the title "बेलमंती रानी" ("Belmanti Rani"), translated as Princess Belmanti, four orphan brothers (Yadav, in the original) live together, the elder three married and the youngest still single. One day, the elder three depart to earn a living, and leave their cadet under his sisters-in-law's care. While taking care of him, the girls try to set him up with their own sisters, but he declines. For this, the girls tell him to find for bride the Princess Belmanti ("Belmanti Rani"), a beautiful princess. The youth goes in search of this Princess Belmanti and finds a sadhu's hut next to a garden. He tends the garden and makes offerings, which the sadhu thanks him for, then directs him to the place where he can find Princess Belmanti: pluck the fruit from the bel tree (or wood apple tree) at the end of the trail and do not look back. The youth goes to fetch the fruit, but looks behind him and turns to ashes. Noticing his delay, the sadhu finds the youth and revives him, who then plucks another fruit and makes a turn back home. He stops by a well to drink water and the fruit falls to the ground, releasing Princess Belmanti in front of him. He goes back home to bring a palanquin for her. While he is away, a midwife comes to fetch water, whom Princess Belmanti asks to drink from her bucket. The midwife steals the maiden's clothes and jewels and shoves her into the well. The youth returns and takes the midwife as his bride, believing her to be Princess Belmanti. Some time later, before the wedding, the youth's brothers go to drink water from the same well and find a flower which they try to retrieve, but only the youth can. He brings it home, but the false bride throws it outside. Flowers and leaves sprout in the ashes, but the woman also discards them. A bel tree sprouts, which the false bride delivers to a gardener. The gardener promises to share its yield with the youth. The bel fruit yields a single bel fruit that the gardener delivers the youth. He takes the bel fruit home with him and opens it: out emerges Princess Belmanti. He marries her, while the midwife is buried alive.

==== Belvanti Rani (Bhojpuri) ====
In a tale from the Bhojpuri region titled "बेलवन्ती रानी" ("Belvanti Rani"), a king has seven sons, six of them married, save for the youngest. One day, during a meal, the young prince complains that the food has no salt, and his sisters-in-law mockingly tell him he wishes to marry the Belvanti Rani. The prince leaves the palace and walks through the forest until he finds a sadhu's hut. The prince sweeps the hut, washes the dishes and hides. The sadhu comes home and finds everything in order, without knowing who did it for him. The prince then forages for fruits and vegetables for the sadhu, then hides. After some days, the sadhu questions who is his mysterious helper, for he promises to give them a boon. The prince appears to the sadhu, prostrates before the sage, and says he is looking for the Belvanti Rani. The sadhu warns the prince the Rani is guarded by fairies around the bel tree, gives him a gutka ("गुटका", in the original), for him to put it in his mouth, rendering him invisible to Belvanti Rani's guardians, then advises him to fetch the bel fruit and to not look back, for the fairies will call for him, but the prince is to pay them no heed, lest he looks back and burns to ashes. The prince leaves the sadhu's hut and goes to find the bel tree where Belvanti Rani lives: he climbs up the tree, cracks a branch, steals the fruit and rushes back to the sadhu. The fairy guardians begin to shout, the prince looks behind himself and turns to ashes, allowing the fairies to retrieve the fruit. Noticing the prince's delay, the sadhu goes to meet him and revives his ashes with water from a cup, then bids him cease his quest. Undeterred, the prince returns to the tree, steals another fruit and rushes back to the sadhu's hut. The sadhu advises the prince to open the bel fruit only at home, not on the road, for he will be deceived. The prince returns home and stops by a well to open the fruit: a beautiful princess comes out of it. The prince decides to rest on her lap. Suddenly, a "chamin" ("चमइन", in the original; 'cobbler woman') comes to the well, strips the princess of her clothes and tosses Belvanti Rani inside the well, then takes her place beside the prince. The prince wakes up and takes the chamin girl back home, believing her to be the Belvanti Rani. When the chamin begins to cook, the rice begins to talk from the pan and mocks her, and so do the vegetables. The prince's sisters-in-law continue to mock him, saying he married a chamin. The prince returns to the sadhu, thinking he made a mistake, and the sadhu advises him to take the chamin to the well, feign thirst and ask her to draw some water, then shove her in the water. It happens thus, and the chamin is thrown in the well. The prince then goes back to the sadhu, who explains the Belvanti Rani has returned to the bel tree. The prince places some gutka in his mouth, races to the garden again and steals another bel fruit, then rushes to the sadhu's hut, where he is advised again to only open the fruit at home. The prince returns home and cracks open the fruit in the palace garden: out comes Belvanti Rani again. The prince marries her and introduces Belvanti Rani to his sisters-in-law, who endure his reply in silence.

==== Belavati Kanya (Bengali) ====
In a Bengali language tale published by author Sourindra Mohan Mukherjee with the title "বেলবতী কন্য" ("Belavati Kanya"; "The Belavati Girl"), a king has seven sons, six of them already married save for the youngest. The prince is blessed by everyone, even his elder sister-in-law, who blesses him to marry Belavati Kanya. After he finishes his studies, the prince asks her where to find this Belavati Kanya, and she tells him that in a country next to the ocean, there is a forest where four munis live, who can point him the way to Belavati Kanya. The prince rides to this forest and enters the first sage's hut; he forages for some banana leaves in the jungle and waits for the first muni. The muni appears and is told of the prince's quest, but cannot help him and tells him to look for the next muni. The prince reaches the other side of the lake, clears out the path, brings fruits and roots and banana leaves for the second muni. This muni thanks the prince for his help, and advises him how to find Belavati Kanya: she is in a bel fruit on the bel tree, guarded by Rakshasas (demons); the prince is to take a deep breath in water, approach the tree and untie a black goat to distract the demons, fetch the fruit and rush back, without exhaling. The prince dives near the tree, finds the goat and lets out his breath, then takes another breath, unties the goat and throws the animal to the demons, then steals the bel fruit and returns to the muni. The muni breaks the fruit in front of the prince, shows him the girl, then closes it again, advising him to only open it at home.

The prince rides back to the palace, when he stops by a beautiful garden and decides to open the bel fruit near the ghat: out comes the Belavati Kanya. The prince decides to rest and lays his head on her lap. Suddenly, a blacksmith's daughter appears and questions Belavati Kanya. After learning they are the prince and princess and soon to be married, the blacksmith's daughter feels jealous and devises a plan: she feigns having a sore leg and asks Belavati Kanya to help her to fetch water for her. When Belavati Kanya is drawing water in a jug, the blacksmith's daughter shoves her in the ghat and takes her place next to the prince. The prince wakes up and believes her to be Belavati Kanya, now looking uglier since he opened it on the road. Still, he takes her back and marries her. Some time later, the seven princes hunt near the ghat, and they spot a red lotus flower in the water, which only the prince can pluck. When he does, it exhales a sweet fragrance for him. The prince takes the flower home, which the false bride rips apart and throws in the garden, to the prince's dismay. Where the petals fell, a bel tree sprouts, yielding a large bel fruit. When the prince's horse passes by the tree, the fruit falls on its back, which is carried to the house of the sahi ('horse-keeper'). The sahi opens up the fruit, and out comes Belavati, who is adopted by the childless sahi couple. Later, the false Belavati feigns illness and asks for the blood of the sahi's adopted daughter as remedy, as goddess Kali told her in a dream. The sahi couple's daughter is killed and the false Belavati bathes in her blood. As time passes, the prince's sadness deepens and he wanders through the land when he reaches a river bank. He finds an empty house nearby and walks to the verandah, where two beautiful birds begin to sing the story of the true Belavati Kanya. The prince listens to the story and asks how he can find Belavati Kanya. The birds tell him that Belavati Kanya lives next to her parents' emerald palace, but comes once a semester to the house near the lake. After he spends six months playing flute with the birds, Belavati Kanya reappears at the verandah. The prince begs for her forgiveness with tears, she accepts his apologies and returns with him to the palace. The prince then executes the blacksmith's daughter and marries the true Belavati Kanya.

=== Bangladesh ===
In a Bangladeshi tale collected from a source in the Tangail region with the title "বেলবতী কন্য" ("Belabati Kanya"; "The Belabati Girl"), a merchant has five sons, the young named Huyaman Saodagar. In time, the merchant dies, and his four elder sons raise their cadet, enrolling him at school to be taught by a swami while they trade as merchants. One day, his teacher's wife wishes to eat deer meat, but cannot find any, so the swami mentions the idea to his students and Huyaman offers to fulfill the request. The next day, Huyaman gathers some friends, says his goodbyes to his family and goes to hunt some game. During the hunt, Huyaman goes to sleep in the forest. Soon enough, Shiva and Parbati, who have been travelling, sight the sleeping youth and comment he would pair well with Belabati Kanya, who lives beyond seven oceans. The deity couple bring Huyaman to Belabati Kanya's room, who is asleep. Both wake up, see each other and fall in love, spend time together, then fall asleep again. Shiva and Parbati bring the youth back to the forest, where he wakes up asking for the mysterious girl whom he saw last night. Huyaman wanders in the forest until he finds a dervish whom he begs to help him to find the maiden, since she lives beyond seven oceans in a heavily guarded palace. The dervish turns him into a bird and advises him to fetch the bel fruit in the garden, but with care, otherwise he will not gain his bride. The youth in bird form flies across the seven oceans, reaches the garden with the bel tree, steals the bel fruit with the girl inside and makes a turn for the dervish, the guardians behind him. However, he eludes his pursuers and, not believing in its magic, breaks open the bel fruit, releasing the Belabati maiden. He flies back to the dervish, who restores him to human form, then walks back home. On the road, he stops to rest by a pond and cracks open the fruit; out comes Belabati Kanya, who makes a pillow for Huyaman. A woman named Maya Mota Goyalani (a fat cowherd) spies on the event from the merchant's house and goes to meet Belabati Kanya. She spins a sob story and convinces the fruit maiden to change saris and ornaments with her for her to wash, and dresses the other with her poor clothes, then shoves her in the water.

Huyaman wakes up and recognizes the cowherd, who claims to be Belabati Kanya who has been released out of her home garden. He takes the false fruit maiden home. Outside, the true Belabati Kanya sings verses alerting Huyaman of the trickery, but the false bride forbids him from going outside by telling him it is a ghost. The next day, the cowherd tries to find the bel fruit in the ghat, but cannot reach it, nor other people, only Huyaman, who brings it home. The false bride asks him for the fruit, and gives it to the swami to get rid of it. However, the fruit appears on the roof of the house and Belabati Kanya keeps singing from the fruit. The fat cowherd takes the bel fruit, goes to the river and tosses it in the water. However, the fruit lands on the other margin and a tree grows, from where the fruit maiden sings her sad song. The merchant, who was barred from leaving the house on the false pretenses of a ghost outside, goes to the tree and demands to know who is singing the song. The true Belabati Kanya comes out of the tree and explains the person Huyaman brought home is an imposter and a cowherd, who tricked and tried to drown Belabati Kanya in the pond, but she survived in the form of a fruit. Huyaman decides to punish the false bride: he has his servants dig up a well and asks the false bride to draw some water. The cowherd falls for the ruse and is shoved into the well, then is buried alive when the well is filled with earth. Huyaman takes the true Belabati Kanya home and marries her.

=== Nepal ===
In a Nepalese tale titled The Bel Girl, a farmer couple has four sons, three married and the cadet still unmarried. He is doted on by his family and sisters-in-law. One day, he catches a bird in a hunt and asks his sister-in-law to cook it for him. The bird is cooked and he eats it, but starts convulsing due to too much red pepper seasoning in the bird. The sister-in-law dislikes his reaction and mockingly tells him to look for a "bel girl" to cook his food. The youngest brother decides to look for her and enters the forest just outside their house until he finds a mound which he clean up to reveal a sage. The youth feeds the sage and he, in gratitude, advises him how to get the bel fruit: reach a pond near a Shiva temple, pluck one bel fruit from a nearby tree and fly back to the sage's location, never looking back on the garden, lest he becomes stone. The sage turns the youth into a parrot, who steals the bel fruit and makes a return, but he becomes stone by listening to a voice. The sage realizes the youth is in danger and walks to the garden, finds the petrified parrot and revives it. The parrot flies back to the tree and steals another bel fruit, this time not looking back. The sage turns the youth to human form and advises him not to break the fruit. The youth journeys back and accidentally trips over a stone, letting the bel fruit fall to the ground and crack in two: a beautiful girl comes out of the fruit. He brings the girl home and marries her, as the tale ends.

=== Mauritius ===
Author Pahlad Ramsurrun collected and published a tale from Mauritius with the title The Legend of the Wood Apple Princess. In this tale, a king and queen have three sons. In time, the elder two find wives, leaving their cadet to be doted on by their parents. His sisters-in-law bring him his morning milk, but mock him for being served. One day, he refuses to tolerate their mocking remarks, and both women, in return, tell him that only the wood apple princess would be enough for him. Moved by their words, he decides to search for the wood apple princess. He leaves home and departs to the Izoo-bizoo Forest, a dangerous location, pass by a crossroads, and finally reaches a sadhu deep in meditation. The prince builds a hut and decides to wait for the sadhu. Sometime later, the sadhu exits his trance and meets the prince, who says he is looking for the wood apple princess. After some failed dissuasion, the sadhu turns the prince into a bird, advises him to fly up north to the Izoo-bizoo Forest, steal one of the wood apples from the largest tree and fly back without looking back, for the she-demons that guard the tree will chase him. The prince, in bird form, flies to the tree to steal the flower and rushes back to the sadhu, but the pursuing she-demons bid him to look behind and he burns to ashes. The sadhu notices the prince's delay and goes to investigate: he finds his ashes and revives him with some hymns. Resurrected, the prince insists in getting the fruit, and is turned into a green parrot. This time, the prince, in parrot form, steals the fruit and goes back to the sadhu, who turns the prince into a cat and the fruit into a fly to trick the chasing she-demons. After the creatures leave, the sadhu turns the prince to human form and warns him not to open the fruit on the road, for the princess will appear, and he will faint and need water. The prince journeys back home, but, doubting the sadhu's words, decides to cut open the fruit: the beautiful wood apple princess emerges, and the prince faints. The princess rushes to a well to fetch some water. A village dancer at the well notices the princess and trades clothes and jewellery with her before she gives her some water, then shoves the princess inside the well and goes to revive the prince. The prince awakens and mistakes the village dancer for the true wood apple princess, then takes her to the palace to make her his wife. His sisters-in-law keep mocking him, for they recognize her as the village dancer, but the prince ignores their remarks. As for the real wood apple princess, a blooming plant appears in the well, which only the prince can pluck and brings it home. At midnight, while he is asleep, the wood apple princess leaves the flower and does chores around the prince's room, then returns to the flower. The prince realizes someone tidies his room and decides to investigate: he pretends to be asleep and sees the wood apple princess leave the flower. He secretly destroys the flower then goes back to sleep. After the princess finishes cleaning up his room, she tries to return to the flower, but cannot find it. The prince catches her, and she reveals she is the true wood apple princess, while the one the prince married is the village dancer. The prince cuts up the dancer's hair and tosses her in prison, then marries the true wood apple princess.

== See also ==
- The Enchanted Canary
- Lovely Ilonka
- The Pomegranate Fairy (Indian folktale)
- The Coconut Lady (Indian folktale)
- The Princess from the Fruit
- Princess Aubergine
- The Prince and the Gypsy Woman
- The Story of a Fairy and a Prince (Shan folktale)
