= Mrs. Leslie Milne =

British anthropologist

Mary Lewis Harper Milne (1 August 1860 – 24 November 1932), known as Mrs. Leslie Milne, was a Scottish anthropologist who traveled extensively and wrote about the ethnic peoples of the Shan State in northern Burma.

== Life ==
Born Mary Lewis Harper on 1 August 1860, she was the only child of Marion Cross of Glasgow and Alexander Harper of Dumfries, who married in 1858 and were living in Ceylon (modern Sri Lanka) when Mary was born. The climate in Ceylon didn't agree with her mother, however, and although the family returned to Dunblane, Scotland, in 1861, her weakened mother died in September 1869. Thereafter her mother's sister, Margaret Cross ("Aunt Maggie"), saw to it that Mary received a good education. After many visits to Italy, where Mary visited often throughout her life, she married Dr. Leslie Milne (George Leslie Hodgson Milne, 1859-1897) in Rome in 1890.

== Career ==
Milne enjoyed travelling. After her husband's death only nine years after their marriage, she visited South Africa, southern China, India, Tibet, and Burma (modern Myanmar). It is for her time in Burma that she is best known, and on which most of her published work focuses. For these publications she chose to write as "Leslie Milne" or "Mrs. Leslie Milne."

Milne's best-known book, The Shans at Home, is an account of the cultural practices and day-to-day life of the Shan people of the village of Namkham in Shan State and is based on the many months she spent living in that village. She was also the author of The Home of an Eastern Clan, a book about the life and culture of the Palaung people. She wrote the first, and what is possibly the only, English-Palaung dictionary. In reviewing The Shans at Home and Milne's book on Palaung grammar, The New York Times commented, "It would be hard to find a more complete and yet readable account of the habits, customs, and religious ideas of a tribe or small nation than the ones she has given of the Palaungs." The Times went on to describe The Home of an Eastern Clan as a "mine of information" for ethnologists.

== Published works ==
- The Shans at Home, London, John Murray (1910).
- An Elementary Palaung Grammar, Oxford, Clarendon Press (1921). Published in 1921, this was the first survey of the grammar of the Palaung language, the language of a hill tribe of the Shan State of Burma and of the Yunnan province of China. Mrs. Milne traveled to Namshan, the capital of the Palaung state of Tawngpeng, to the Palaungs of North Hsenwi, as well as to the Palaungs of Yunnan to collect material for this book.
- The Home of an Eastern Clan: A Study of the Palaungs of the Shan State, Oxford, Clarendon Press (1924).
- A Dictionary of English-Palaung and Palaung-English, Rangoon (1931).

== Family ==
Mrs. Leslie Milne never remarried and had no children. She died in Scotland on 24 November 1952, aged 92.

== Bibliography ==
- Shorto, H. L. (1973). Three Mon-Khmer Word Families. Bulletin of the School of Oriental and African Studies, Vol 36 No. 2, pp. 374–81.
- Grierson, George A. (1922). An Elementary Palaung Grammar: Book Review. Bulletin of the School of Oriental and African Studies, Vol 2 No. 2, pp. 339–40.
- Hodson, T. C. (1912). The Shans at Home: Book Review. The Journal of the Royal Anthropological Institute of Great Britain and Ireland, Vol 12, pp. 27–29.
- Hess, Nathaniel. "Leslie Milne, Owner of Wheatley Manor (1925 to 1939)." 2268 Leslie Milne and the Manor House. Wheatley Village Archive, © Wheatley Village Archive (https://www.wheatleyarchive.org.uk/images/files/2268-leslie-milne-and-manor-house.pdf)
