= Phra Rod Meree =

- Thai theatrical poster
- Directed by: Sompote Sands
- Written by: Neramit
- Produced by: Sompote Sands
- Starring: Dam Datsakorn; Toon Hiransap; Supansa Nuengpirom; Ampha Pusit; Duangcheewan Komolsen
- Cinematography: Anan Inla-or
- Music by: Phim Patiphan
- Production company: Chaiyo Productions
- Distributed by: Chaiyo Productions
- Release date: 11 April 1981
- Running time: 120 minutes
- Country: Thailand
- Language: Thai

Phra Rod Meree (Thai: พระรถเมรี) is a 1981 Thai fantasy film directed by Sompote Sands. It is one of the most successful Thai feature films ever made in Thailand.

The story is based on The Twelve Sisters, a Thai folklore myth that originated in one of the Jataka tales. This same story was also adapted into a Thai fantasy lakhon.

== Plot ==
Twelve girls are abandoned by their parents because they are too poor to take care of them. The twelve daughters are rescued by an ogress (yaksha) in disguise who promises to take care about them as her own daughters.

Phra Rodasan (Phra Rod), the only surviving son of the twelve sisters, goes on a quest to the ogre kingdom in order to heal his mother and his aunts' blindness. There he falls in love with the ogress' daughter, Meree.

== Production ==
Sands stated that the film was aiming to teach younger generations the importance of filial devotion. The set designs and models were created by Chao Chimpli and Churat Saengduenchai respectively.

== Screenings ==
The film was screened in Kyoto in 2023.

== See also ==
- The Twelve Sisters
- Nang Sib Song (lakorn)
- Ka Kee
