= The Twelve Sisters =

Southeast Asian folktale

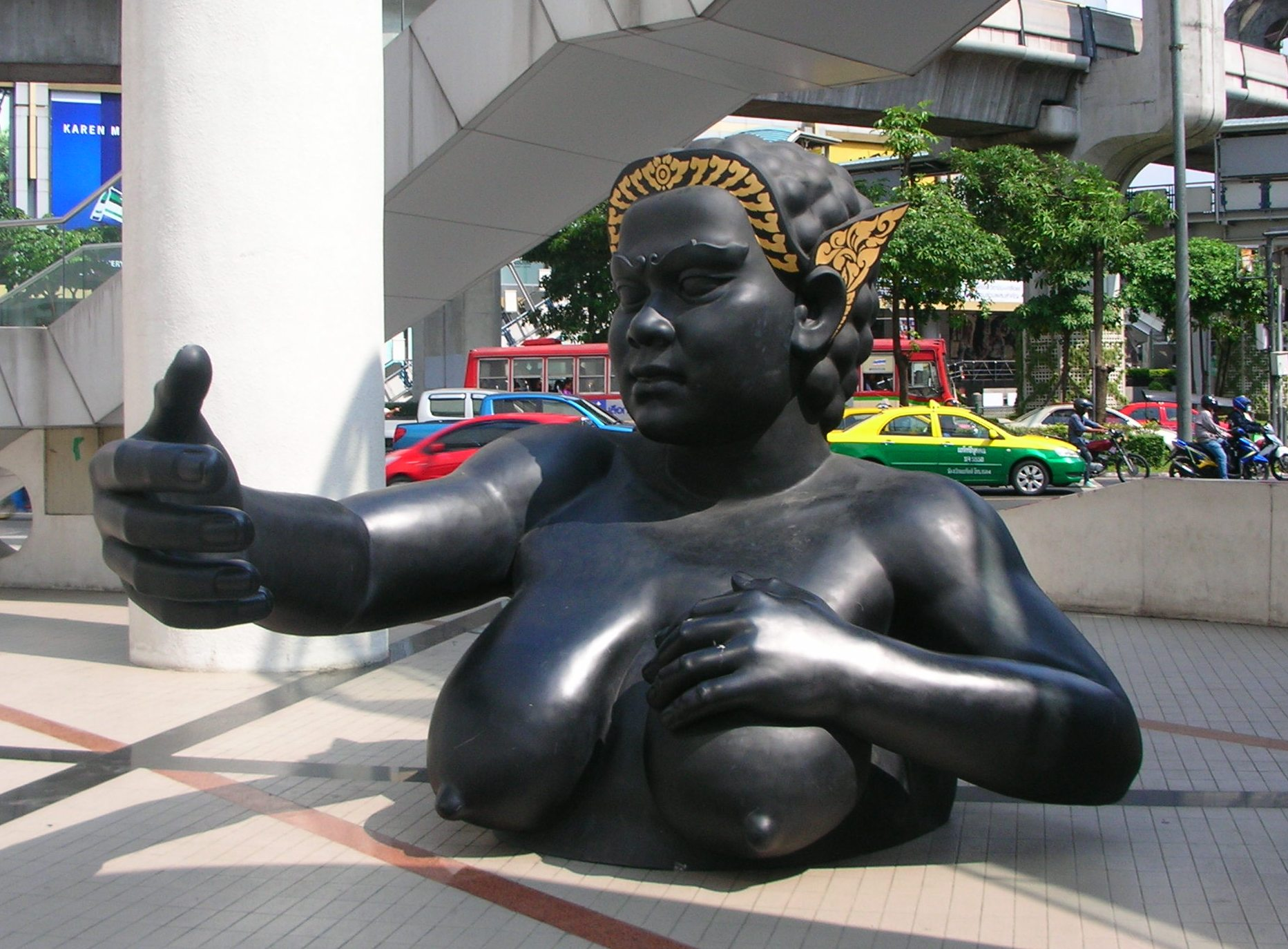
Statue of a yakṣī, one of the main characters of this story

The legend of The Twelve Sisters or The Twelve Ladies, known as Nang Sip Song (นางสิบสอง) or as Phra Rot Meri (พระรถเมรี) in Thai and រឿងពុទ្ធិសែននាងកង្រី Puthisen Neang KongRei in Cambodia, is a Southeast Asian folktale, and also an apocryphal Jātaka Tale, the Rathasena Jātaka of the Paññāsa Jātaka collection. It is one of the stories of the previous lives of Shakyamuni Buddha in which Rathasena, the son of one of the twelve women, is the bodhisattva.

== Background ==
The story of the Twelve Sisters is part of the folk tradition of certain countries in Southeast Asia such as Thailand, Cambodia and Laos and the folktales derived from it come in different versions, often under different titles depending from the country. This legend was also brought to Malaysia by the Malaysian Siamese where it became popular among the Malaysian Chinese community.

It is a long story about the life of twelve sisters abandoned by their parents and adopted by an ogress (a Rakshasa in Hinduism) (Lao Sundara; Khmer: Santhamea (យក្សសន្ធមារ); Thai: Santhumala) disguised as a beautiful lady. The conclusion is the sad love story about the only surviving son of the twelve sisters, Rathasena (Thai: Phra Rotthasen (พระรถเสน); Khmer: Puthisen (ពុទ្ធិសែន) or Rithisen; Lao: Putthasen) with Manora (Thai: Meri เมรี; Khmer: KongRei (នាងកង្រី); Lao: Kankari; (Note: This may not be accurate, as it seems to come from only one source, Epitome of the Pali Canon by Chroniker Press. Other sources reference readings such as Kuanghi, Kwang Hi, etc. See for example Thararat Chareonsonthichai 2017.) ), the adopted daughter of ogress Sundara. At the end both died together upon the long and lonely shore of a lake.

== Thai version ==
A long time ago, there was a rich merchant and his beautiful wife who lived happily in a big house. Despite their good fortune, the couple didn't have any children. One day, they went together to a shrine and made an offering of twelve banana hands to a tree spirit. Not long thereafter the wife became pregnant and the rich man wished with all his might that the child would be a boy, but his wife gave birth to a girl. His wife, however, conceived again and again. She became pregnant twelve times and each time she had a daughter. By that time his business started to go wrong for him since the ships that took his goods to sell in another country were robbed several times. Finally the rich merchant ended up borrowing a lot of money from his friends trying to fix his business problems. Yet, no matter what he did, his family kept getting poorer.

The former rich man found it hard having so many mouths to feed. So he made a plan to abandon his daughters in the forest. He hid this plan from his wife but his youngest daughter named Phao heard about it. When their father left them alone in the deep forest, the twelve girls were able to find their way back home thanks to their younger sister who had left marks in the path. But their father tried again and this time they were not able to find their way back home. They spent days walking deeper and deeper into the forest and became very hungry. Their father had given them twelve packets of rice, but when they opened them they found out that eleven of them were filled with sand and only one had rice in it. They shared that little rice and ate it crying, lamenting their misfortune. Wandering aimlessly the twelve girls came to a lake, where they tried to catch fish to satiate their hunger. Each of the sisters succeeded in catching a fish and eleven of them playfully poked the eyes of their fish with sharp twigs, except for the youngest one who poked only one eye.

Finally they arrived to the Yaksha kingdom, where an ogress named Santhumala saw the exhausted and emaciated girls resting under a tree and decided to adopt them. The ogress transformed herself into a human being, a pleasant-looking woman, and brought the twelve sisters to her home. For many years she treated them as her own daughters and under her care the twelve girls grew up into beautiful young women.

One day, while Santhumala was away hunting, the twelve sisters met an old man who told them that Santhumala was not a human, but an ogress who liked to eat young women like them. So they fled from the ogre kingdom and wandered for days until they arrived to a clear river where they took a bath to refresh themselves. The local king saw the twelve ladies playing in the water and fell in love with them. So he brought them to his palace and married the twelve sisters.

When Santhumala came back to her home and found that the girls were gone, she flew into a rage. She quickly found out where they were and transformed herself into a very beautiful young woman, more beautiful than any of the twelve sisters; then she went to the city of the king and asked to meet him. The king was spellbound by Santhumala's beauty and swiftly married her, promoting her to the rank of first queen. Jealous of the king's favoritism, the Twelve Sisters were not kind to the new queen. Although they were polite to her in front of the king, they were often mean to her in private. To take her revenge from the Twelve Sisters, Santhumala, the favorite queen, feigned sickness and the king became worried. She told the king that the cause of her disease was the ill-treatment of the twelve other wives and the only thing that would heal her would be a medicine distilled from the eyes of the Twelve Sisters.

The king was so infatuated with Santhumala that he assented. Under his orders eleven of his wives had both of their eyes gouged out, but the youngest one had only one eye removed. Following this the Twelve Sisters were banished to a deep dark cave from where there was no way out. Then the king instructed his servants not to bring any food and not to help the Twelve Sisters in any way.

All the twelve sisters were pregnant and they all successively gave birth to babies but all died. Since the women were being starved under Santhumala's strict orders, each one chopped her baby's body into twelve pieces to share with the other sisters to eat. When Phao gave birth to a beautiful boy who was alive, she lied to her sisters that her son was dead. Phao named her son Rothasen and looked after him well. As he grew he found a secret way out of the deep cave. He had a cock that won in all the cockfights. With the prize money he bought rice and from then onward he brought regularly food for his mother and his eleven aunts. As years went by Rothasen became a handsome young man. When the king heard of him, he invited him to the palace where he played games of dice with the monarch displaying great skill.

Santhumala found out that twelve sisters were alive and she was angry that her plan to get rid had failed. Again she feigned sickness and told the king that only a certain fruit growing in her kingdom could cure her. She also told the king that only Phra Rothasen would be able to fetch it. So she wrote the following letter to her adoptive daughter, Meri, in the language of the ogres: "If this young man arrives to our kingdom in the morning, devour him in the morning; but if he arrives in the night, devour him in the night"

On the way to the kingdom Phra Rothasen met an old Rishi who gave him a flying horse named Pachi to ride and who gave him hospitality. While the boy slept the sage altered the meaning of the letter by replacing the words "devour him" with "marry him".

Thus, when he arrived at the kingdom of the ogres Phra Rothasen went straight to Meri and showed her the letter. Meri was surprised and pleased at seeing the virtuous-looking and handsome young man and she fell in love with him, celebrating her wedding with him straight away as directed.

Meri was a kind-hearted and beautiful lady and Phra Rothasen lived with her very happily for some time, but he remembered his blind mother and aunts who still stayed in the dark cave. While showing him the palace, Meri had told Rothasen about certain magic medicines kept in a locked room including Phra Rothasen's mother and aunts’ eyes. Then he made a plan to get Meri to sleep by making her drink wine and take the eyes for his mother and aunts. Thus one night, after Meri was sleeping, Phra Rothasen stole many medicines and the eyes from the locked room. Meri woke up and looked for her husband but she saw him far away riding his flying horse. She suddenly grew into a giant and followed Phra Rothasen crying and calling him with a loud voice. To stop her, Phra Rothasen threw a magic branch that turned the space between them into a deep lake and a high mountain. Seeing her husband escape from her Meri wailed in despair, asking him to stop. Phra Rothasen was moved by her sad screams and replied that he will back after he finished his urgent mission. Then Phra Rothasen flew away and left Meri with a broken heart crying bitterly at the shore of the lake.

Phra Rothasen arrived back to his city and killed evil Santhumala with a magic club. He then went into the deep dark cave and healed the eyes of his mother and aunts by putting them back in their place with a special magic ointment. His mother and aunts left their deep cave and regained their former status with the king. They invited him to live in the palace again but Phra Rothasen told them that he had to hurry back to live with Meri who was waiting for him.

But meanwhile Meri had died of sorrow. During her long wait she had shed so many tears that she had become blind. Before she died, she solemnly vowed that she would follow Phra Rothasen in every future reincarnation. Then she died with her grandmother crying at her side and surrounded by her servants.

When Phra Rothasen arrived to the ogre kingdom he realized it was too late. He heard about her vow and carried his wife's body. Full of sadness at having lost everything, he dropped dead while holding his wife in his arms. Finally, their spirits flew together to their next rebirth where they would be joined again.

In Tambon Mon Nang, Phanat Nikhom District, Chonburi Province, there is a shrine to the Twelve Sisters with the rock they used as pillow when they wandered in the wilderness and a Carissa carandas tree.

Sa Siliam (สระสี่เหลี่ยม), also in Chonburi Province, is said to be the pond where Phra Rothasen brought his cock to drink water when he ran cockfights to make a living for the twelve sisters while they were banished in the deep dark cave, according to a legend of the area.

Author Jit-Kasem Sibunruang republished the Thai version with the title The Eyes of the Twelve Queens.

== Cambodian version ==
In Cambodia this legend is known as រឿងភ្នំនាងកង្រី Puthisen Neang KongRei. The story goes thus:

Once upon a time, there was an affluent couple who were unable to bear children of their own. They decided to travel to a giant Banyan tree, asking the tree's deity for children. Soon after, the wife gave birth to 12 daughters. The expense of providing for the 12 daughters has gradually reduced the man's fortune. They became impoverished and were unable to make ends meet, so he decided to abandon their 12 children in the deep wilderness. When the 12 girls realized that their parents had abandoned them, they sobbed loudly, uncertain of what to do next. They wandered around the forest aimlessly, gathering leaves and wild fruits for nourishment. They came across a pond and each caught a fish. All the elder sisters poked both the fish eyes out playfully except for the youngest, Neang Pov (នាងពៅ), who carved only one of the eyes and stopped.

They continued their journey after their meal until they arrived to the Kingdom of the Yakk (Rakshasa), which was ruled by a Yakkani Queen named Neang Santhamea (យក្សសន្ធមារ). There, Neang Santhamea appointed the 12 sisters as servants for her toddler, KongRei. They lived with her for a while, until the youngest sister met an elderly man who warned her about the Yakk and advised her to flee. She did not listen, but one day when feeding the horse, she came upon a barn that was filled with human carcasses. She panicked and remembered the old man's remarks. She alerted her sisters and fled, they each stole a crown and some valuables from the Yakk queen.

They made their way to the neighboring Kingdom of Injakbat Borey (នគរឥន្ទបត្តបុរី). The sisters bathed in the pond water while playfully adorned themselves with the crowns and jewels they stole. Looking as if they were Apsaras descending from heaven, a noble's servant noticed them and hurried to notify his master. The noble summoned the girls and presented them to the king. As soon as the king saw them entering the royal palace, he fell in love with all of them at first sight. They were wed en masse to the King, Preah Bath Rothtasith (ព្រះបាទរថសិទ្ធិ).

Neang Santhamea was enraged by the news, so she concealed her identity using the Maya illusion magic, which was no small feat given her physical stature and reputation. She charmed Preah Bhat Rothtasith into making her his 13th concubine but most beloved consort, and was soon raised to the Queen position, the highest rank in the royal harem court. After gaining her new husband's affection and sympathy, Santhamea pretended to be ill with a fatal ailment that no doctor or medicine could heal. Neang Santhamea took advantage of Rothtasith's rising desperation and told him that only a concoction made from the eyes of her 12 pregnant co-wives could save her life. Rothtasith, enthralled by Santhamea's act, ordered his soldiers to gouge out the eyes of 11 of the 12 concubines, with Neang Pov allowed to preserve one of her eyes. Following their ritual mutilation, the now blind or almost blind women were imprisoned in a cave. Forced by the circumstance and hunger, they devoured their newborn infants, sharing pieces among the sisters to satiate their hunger. Neang Pov kept the meat of her nieces and nephews, giving it to her sisters instead of her newborn. She raised Puthisen (ពុទ្ធិសែន) through many hardships in the darkness of the cave, surrounded by his blind, grief-stricken aunts.

Puthisen grew up and became curious about the outside world; he begged his mother to let him go out and play with the villagers' children. Neang Pov decided to let him go. He met a group of kids and joined them in playing Ongkounh (អង្គុញ). He would wager with the local children that if they won, he would be their slave for the day, but if he won, they would have to give him 12 packets of rice. Every day, he would win 12 packets of rice for his mother and royal aunts, which raises a lot of questions from the aunts. Neang Pov decided that it was time to reveal everything so she did. Puthisen was a precocious child, his genius causing him to win against everyone in every sort of game. His genius was soon revealed to the king, who asked Puthisen to visit the imperial palace so he could challenge him. He recognized the King as his father as soon as he saw him. Neang Pov revealed to him about the past and sent him to live in the royal palace.

When Puthisen reached adulthood, Neang Santhamea began to worry about the repercussions of him becoming Crown Prince. In order to avoid any possible acts of vengeance by Puthisen, Santhamea put a curse on the King. He fell ill, no matter who or what could not cure him. She told the King that there was a panacea in the Kingdom of the Yakks that might be able to cure him and told him that Puthisen should go and get it. The King decided to follow her words and gave Puthisen a letter ordering him to use it for entry into the kingdom. The letter got manipulated by the Queen and became a death warrant that stated, "If arrives dawn, devour dawn. If it arrives at dusk, devour dusk." Luckily the letter was altered by a Rshi, Ta Eisei (តាឥសី), when Puthisen was resting in his Ashram to: "If arrives dawn, marry dawn. If it arrives at dusk, marry dusk." ("ពេលទៅដល់យប់សម្លាប់យប់ ទៅដល់ថ្ងៃសម្លាប់ថ្ងៃ" => "ទៅដល់ថ្ងៃរៀបការថ្ងៃ ដល់យប់រៀបការយប់") When Puthisen arrived in the Kingdom of the Yakk, the sentinel giants read the letter and followed its orders. She fell in love when she saw the heroic, virtuous and handsome young man. Unbeknownst to Neang Santhamea, her beloved daughter Neang KongRei (នាងកង្រី) became the adoring wife of her greatest enemy. From then on, they reigned peacefully and had two sons named, "Chum Sen" (ជុំសែន) and "Reth Sen" (រថសែន).

One day, she told her husband about the divine drum (ស្គរជ័យ). If you knock it, the hidden magical weapons will come out, especially the eyes of the 12 concubines. When the opportunity arose, Puthisen went in to steal the divine drum, in order to help his long-suffering mother and royal aunts. When KongRei learned her husband had departed, she followed him, sobbing and begging him to return, but he had to reject since he valued filial piety over personal romantic passion. She was unable to keep up with the flying horse, Mony Keo and fell. Puthisen arrived at the Kingdom of Injakbat Borey. Santheama realized what had occurred and transformed into her true Yakk form, aiming to murder Puthisen, but Puthisen was prepared and struck on the divine drum, causing the magical weapon to fly out and instantly pierced Neang Santhamea. Neang Santhamea's body turned to stone and was abandoned in the depths of the forest. As Puthisen took medicine to cure the eyes of his mother and royal aunts, King Rothtasith realized his mistakes and allowed his 12 wives back to the palace. Puthisen said his farewell to his parents and returned to his wife and children after fulfilling his duties. Unfortunately, Puthisen discovered his wife's corpse, as she wept till death and became a mountain (Phnom Kong Rei) in Kampong Chhnang. Puthisen mourned the death of his wife and arranged a funeral for her. Puthisen returned to his parents' kingdom after the funeral and reigned happily ever after.

Phnom Kong Rei is a mountain in Kampong Chhnang Province, Central Cambodia. The silhouette of the mountain seen from afar looks like a sleeping lady. According to local folklore this mountain is related to the story. Kampong Cham province of Cambodia as the temple of the 12 sisters rest in Siem Reap, Cambodia. The story was adapted to movie and released in 1968.

Russian scholar Nikolay D. Foshko translated the tale to Russian as "История горы Кангрей" ("The Story of mountain Kangrey").

== Lao version ==
The Lao version of the Twelve Sisters, the story of Putthasen (Buddhasen), was translated into French by Louis Finot in 1917.

A merchant fell into poverty and abandoned his twelve daughters in the forest.

Instead of a magical branch or potion, in this version of the story Putthasen throws magical limes or lime seeds as he runs from his wife.

Two mountains located close together facing Luang Prabang on the right bank of the Mekong are named Phu Tao and Phu Nang, after Putthasen and Kankari.

== Jātaka version ==
Several stories written in the style of a jātaka appeared in Southeast Asia. Several were assembled into collections often known as the “Fifty Jātaka” (Pali: Paññāsa Jātaka) even though the number of stories varies.

Rathasena appears in the collection assembled at National Library of Thailand in the 1920s by Prince Damrong Rajanubhab, and translated from Pali into Thai. The Rathasena story does not appear in any other of these collections.

It is often stated that the folktale was based on the jātaka. Possibly, it was the other way round. The jātaka version is much shorter, in particular, omitting the romantic finale. Several key points in the plot are missing. The verses have in part been taken from well-known passages in classical jātaka stories such as the Vessantara Jataka.

=== Summary ===
A rich man, who is ruined after having twelve daughters, abandons them in a forest. They are adopted by an ogress, Sandhamāra, but escape to Kutāra. After they are found in a banyan tree, emitting a golden aura, the king of Kutāra makes all of them his queens. Sandhamāra enraptures the king, is made his major queen, and persuades him to pluck out the twelve queens’ eyes, leaving only the youngest with sight in one eye. The eleven others become pregnant. Sakka sends down the Bodhisatta Rathasena to be conceived by the youngest. The king has all twelve imprisoned in a cave. When the eleven give birth, they share their babies’ flesh as food. The youngest gives birth to Rathasena. On growing up, Rathasena appeals to Sakka to provide them with cloth and ornaments, and to teach him to gamble.

To feed the twelve, he gambles, first with cowherds, later with the king. When the king learns that this remarkable boy is his own son, Sandhamāra maneuvers to have him sent to the ogre realm carrying a letter. On the way he meets a rishi who reads the letter, finds that Rathasena is being sent to the ogre realm to be eaten, and changes the wording. On Rathasena's arrival, the ogress's daughter falls in love with him, and he is anointed with her to rule the realm. After a dalliance, he takes her to the royal park, gets her drunk, learns from her the means to restore the sight to the twelve sisters, and escapes. On failing to follow him, the ogress's daughter dies of a broken heart. On seeing him return, the ogress Sandhamāra dies of defeat. Rathasena restores sight to the twelve, who again become queens.

== Shan version ==
Anthropologist Mrs. Leslie Milne collected a tale from the Shan people which she titled The Story of Twelve Sisters, although, in a note, she remarked the number of sisters may be seven. In this tale, many years ago, a man tries to teach twelve sisters not to take any life. However, the twelve girls catch fishes in the river: the eleven elder sisters kill the fishes they caught by passing a string through the animals' eyes, while the youngest only passes through one eye of hers. In their next reincarnation, they are reborn as sisters again, and are given to a local king as his co-wives. Meanwhile, in the land of the ogres, famine ravages their land. The ogress queen tells her husband, the ogre king, will find him food, then bathes in a magical pond to become a human maiden. The ogress queen, in disguise, goes to marry the local king and becomes his favourite co-wife, to the jealousy of the other twelve sisters.

One night, the ogress queen uses her powers to summon the land of the ogres next to the human realm, and steals the eyes of the twelve sisters, leaving the twelfth blind in one eye. The next day, the ogress queen lies that the twelve sisters are cannibal ogres who, in desperation, devoured her own eyes. The king, in shock and horror, orders them to be banished from the palace.

The twelve sisters take refuge in a cave, and each of them gives birth to a child; the elder eleven sisters devouring their own to feed themselves, while the youngest spares her baby, a boy. After seven days, hole men come to the cave and, seeing the beauty of the child, place a wand on him and he grows up in moments to a fifteen-year-old youth. Deity Sakya also appears to give the youth a magic "mak-nim", which he uses to play with the boys in the village. Whenever he wins, he asks for twelve portions of rice and curry, and twelve gourds of paddy, to give to his mother and his aunt.

News of the youth's requests reach the king's ears, and the monarch becomes so fond of him he dresses him in fine clothes. Meanwhile, the ogress queen, noticing the boy, realizes that the twelve sister survived, and plans to get rid of the boy. First, she gives him a letter to be given to the ogress queen's father in the land of ogres.

== Popular culture ==
=== Films and soap operas ===
The story has been adapted to Thai films, Thai television soap operas (ละคร) and Khmer films.

==== In Khmer ====
- Rithisen Neang Kongrey 1966-67 Film (this was the earliest version based on the legend of Kompong Chnnang)
- Puthisen Neang Kong Rey (1968 film)
- Rithisen Neang Kong Rei (2000 film)

==== In Thai ====
- Phra Rot Meri Rue Nang Sip Song
- Phra Rod Meree (1981 film)
- Nang Sip Song (1983 TV series)
- Nang Sip Song (1987 TV series)
- Phra Rothasen (TV series)
- Nang Sip Song (2000 TV series)
- Nang Sip Song (2002 TV series), starring Matika Arthakornsiripho and Sapol Chonnawee, and broadcast on Channel 7
- The Adventure of 12 Ladies (animated movie)
- Phrasuthon Manora (2003)

=== Other media ===
The Twelve Sisters story has been adapted as well to printed media, such as books, children's books, Thai comics in classical style and in manga.

The theme of the story of the Twelve Ladies is ever popular and is found in traditional theatre, dances, poetry and songs.

== See also ==
- Jataka tales
- Thai folklore
- Literature of Cambodia
- Phnom Kong Rei
- The Son of Seven Mothers

== Bibliography ==
- Auguste Pavie, Les douze jeunes filles ou l'Histoire de Neang Kangrey, "Extrait de Mission Pavie, Indochine, tome 1." Edition Institut Bouddhique, Phnom Penh 1969.
- Dorothy H. Fickle, An historical and structural study of the Paññāsa Jātaka, University of Pennsylvania, 1978
