= Tah Tien =

1973 film directed by Sompote Sands

- Film poster
- Directed by: Sompote Saengduenchai
- Written by: Paichayon; A. Chanpen
- Produced by: Churat Saengduenchai; Sompote Saengduenchai
- Starring: Supak Likitkul; Sombat Metanee; Sukon Kewlhiem; Sompong Pongmitr; Tape Subpokpoon; Prim Phraphaporn; Tape Tienchai; Sri Suriya; Sipeuak; Chuen-chaeh
- Cinematography: Sombat Khanthasen
- Music by: Mondree Oongeium; Boonyong Ketkong
- Production companies: Chaiyo Productions; Sala Chalermkrung Royal Theatre
- Distributed by: Chaiyo Productions; Sala Chalermkrung Royal Theatre
- Release date: 9 March 1973
- Running time: 142 minutes
- Country: Thailand
- Language: Thai
- Budget: ฿200,000
- Box office: ฿3,000,000

Tah Tien (Thai: ท่าเตียน, pronounced [tʰâː tīa̯n]) is a 35mm Thai kaiju film released in 1973 directed by and featuring special effects from Sompote Saengduenchai (aka Sompote Sands).

== Synopsis ==
Chaba is a magic giant toad in beautiful woman form, she is the daughter of a Queen of Naga who spawns on the human world. She lived alone with an old man in the jungle. One day, a young Bangkok man named Narent came to the jungle to study natural science and zoology. He must adventure with many beasts, including primeval creatures and flash flood. Finally, he meets Chaba.

He invited Chaba to visit in Bangkok. With her mischievousness, she made the giant temple guard both met, feuding and fighting fiercely at the midstream of Chao Phraya river, where it is now referred to as "Tah Tien".

== Cast ==
- Supak Likitkul as Chaba
- Sombat Metanee as Narent
- Sukon Kewlhiem as Grandpa
- Sompong Pongmitr as Hunter Pong
- Tape Subpokpoon as Maseng/ Phaya Naga
- Prim Phraphaporn as Queen of Naga
- Tape Tienchai as Yak Wat Pho
- Sri Suriya as Horse owner
- Sipeuak as Yak Wat Jaeng
- Chuen-chaeh as Horse thief

== Production & reception ==
The film is inspired by Yak Wat Jaeng, one of the temple guards at the Wat Arun temple in Bangkok.

Tah Tien is Sompote Saengduenchai's first film. He had been inspired by his studies of Toho and Tsuburaya Productions of Japan in the early 1960s and the Japanese kaiju films of the era, particularly Daimajin from 1966.

The film's plot is a combination of two famed tales from traditional Thai folklore, Uttai Tawee and an urban legend on the origin of the name of Tah Tien (now a pier, market and tourist attraction on Rattanakosin Island near Grand Palace and Wat Pho). The two giants featured in the film and the urban legend are the temple guards of two Thai Buddhist monasteries, or wats on opposite banks of the Chao Phraya River. Yak Wat Jaeng (the Giant of Wat Jaeng) is depicted as a traditional Thai demon, or Yak is stationed at Wat Arun from the Thonburi side ("Wat Arun" was formerly known as "Wat Jaeng," hence the name), while Yak Wat Pho (the Giant of Wat Pho), depicted in the film as an armored Chinese warrior (though Yak Wat Pho was traditionally a Thai yak much like Yak Wat Jaeng) and resides at Wat Pho on the Phra Nakhon (Bangkok) side. The most common version of the legend relates that one day, one of the giants, usually Yak Wat Pho, borrowed money from the other but never got around to resolving the debt. The tension between the two eventually escalated into a major brawl that devastated and flattened the local neighborhood. A mediator eventually stepped in (often cited to be either an angel, a monk, a yogi, the Buddha, or a yak from the royal Wat Phra Kaeo temple) and ordered them to stand down, but the damage had been done. Owing to the flattened landscape as a result of the fight, the area was rechristened "Tah Tien" (or spelt "Tha Tian"), translating roughly as 'Flat Port.' The true origins of the name 'Tah Tien' is still debated to this day.

The film's release met with major success, earning ฿1.4 million from Bangkok cinemas alone almost instantly, eventually winning up to ฿3 million after two weeks of circulation in the countryside. In addition to this, the main theme song of the film Meesak Nakarat became a major hit and remains popular to this day.

For Sompote, the massive success of Tah Tien inspired him to bring Yak Wat Jaeng and Yak Wat Pho back for more roles in his next films, including Jumborg Ace & Giant in 1974 and Magic Lizard in 1985.
