= The Sleeping Lady =

The Sleeping Lady may refer to:

- List of mountains named The Sleeping Lady
- The Sleeping Lady, a small clay figurine/statuette recovered from the prehistoric Ħal Saflieni Hypogeum, Malta
- The Sleeping Lady, a 1980 book by Canadian poet Joe Rosenblatt
- Sleeping Lady, a 1996 novel by American author Sue Henry

== See also ==
- Dead woman (disambiguation)
- Sleeping Lady with Black Vase, by Hungarian painter Róbert Berény (1887–1953)
