= The Witch in the Stone Boat =

Icelandic fairy tale

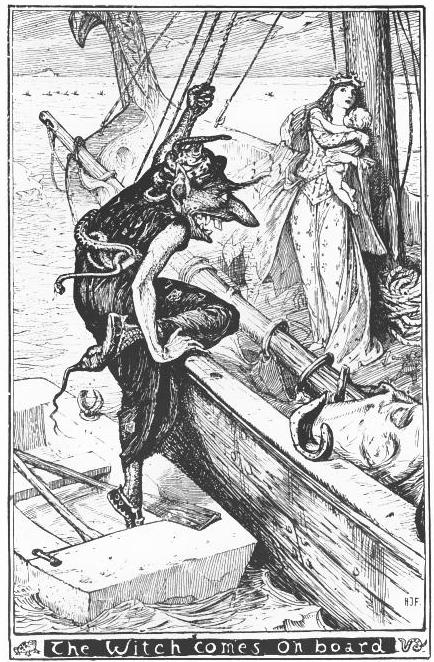
"The Witch comes on board", from "The Witch in the Stone Boat". —Illustration by H. J. Ford,The Yellow Fairy Book (1894)

"The Witch in the Stone Boat" (Icelandic: Skessan á steinnökkvanum 'the giantess in the stone boat') is an Icelandic folktale, originally collected by Jón Árnason (1864), translated into English in Andrew Lang's fairy tale collection The Yellow Fairy Book (1894).

The antagonist is a giantess (skessa; elsewhere called troll-woman, and revealed to be the sister of a three-headed giant), though rendered as "witch" by Lang, who shape-shifts and assumes the place of a queen, while having the true queen imprisoned.

It has been categorized as a subtype of ATU 462, "The Outcast Queens and the Ogress Queen".

== Textual notes ==
"Skessan á steinnökkvanum" (literally 'The skessa [giantess] in the stone boat'), (Note: The Icelandic word steinnökkvi is defined as "a stained, painted boat (?), (not a stone boat)" in the Cleasby-Vigfusson dictionary, but this is a matter of dispute, as pointed out by Ben Waggoner; other lexicographers such as Johan Fritzner have indeed glossed the term as a "boat of stone" (Danish: båd af sten).) was a selection in Jón Árnason's folktale/fairy tale collection, Íslenzkar Þjóðsögur og Æfintýri Vol. 2 (1862–64).

It was later translated into German as "Die Riesin in dem Steinboote" ('The giantess in the stone-boat') by Josef Poestion in Isländische Märchen (1884), a known source of Icelandic tales for Andrew Lang.

Andrew Lang's English translation "The Witch in the Stone Boat" appeared in the Yellow Fairy Book, whose first edition was published in 1894.

Other German translations are Adeline Rittershaus's "Die Riesin im Steinboot" (1902), and the similarly title rendering by Hans Naumann and Ida Naumann (1923).

The tale was translated into English with the title The Troll in the Stone-Craft, in the English version of Jón Árnason's Icelandic Legends: Second series, and in a later publication as The Giantess and the Granite Boat.

== Tale type ==
This folktale is considered to be a version of Aarne-Thompson-Uther type 462 "The Outcast Queens and the Ogress Queen", and is cognate with the Italian tale "The Dragon" (Pentamerone IV. 5).

A second variant of the tale, according to the type description, is The Son of Seven Queens, an Indian fairy tale collected by Joseph Jacobs. In it, a king who was married to seven co-wives follows a white hind during a hunt. Hot on its trail, the king tracks the hind to a hut in the woods, where an old witch lives. Soon after, he meets a woman of immense beauty who he realises is the transformed white hind. As a first request, the supernatural woman orders the king to get rid of his former wives in order to replace the outcast queens. Another variant is The Demon is at last conquered by the King's Son, collected by Maive Stokes, in Indian Fairy Tales (1880).

Variants of the tale type are also attested in South Asian and Latin American folktale traditions.

== Synopsis ==
A king told his son Sigurd to marry, recommending a daughter of another king as prospective wife. Sigurd traveled to that kingdom and made his marriage proposal, and the bride's king agreed to the match, on condition that Sigurd would stay and help him as long as he could. Sigurd promised to remain, until such time as he received news of his father's death. When Sigurd learned of his father's death, he set sail for his homeland with his wife and their two-year-old son.

The ship was one day short of completing its journey when the wind died down. Sigurd was overcome with drowsiness and left the queen and his child alone on the deck. There approached a stone boat carrying a frightening "witch" (Lang. tr.) or "troll-wife" (Icelandic: tröllkona (Note: Hall's retelling: "giantess"; Poestion tr.: Riesenweib; Rittershaus tr.: Riesin.)). The witch boarded ship, snatched away the baby and assumed the queen's place by transforming into her likeness and wearing the fine clothes she stripped from the queen. The imposter put the real queen on the stone boat, and spoke incantations to the boat telling it to go without straying to her brother in the underworld. The boat shot off and was soon out of sight from the ship. The disappearance of the real mother made the baby cry uncontrollably, and the witch's effort to quiet it was to no avail. So the witch went beneath deck and scolded Sigurd for leaving her alone on the deck. Such a temper tantrum was something Sigurd had never received from his wife, and it surprised him, but he thought she had an excusable reason this time. But for all the efforts of the two of them, they could not stop the boy from crying.

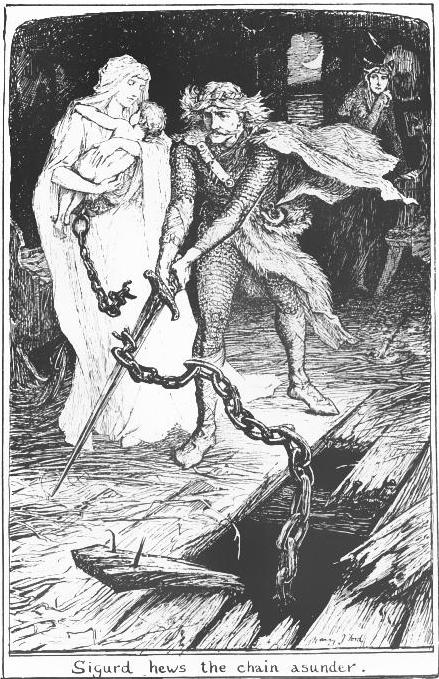
"Sigurd hews the chain asunder" —Illustration by H. J. Ford

Sigurd was now the ruler of his homeland, succeeding his dead father. The little boy who used to be such a quiet child hardly stopped crying since that day, so he had to be given up to be raised by a wet nurse (or foster mother fostrá), one of the court ladies. Sigurd noticed his wife's change in temperament: she was now more "haughty and stubborn, and difficult to deal with".

But the fake queen's identity was to unravel. Two young courtiers who were in the habit of playing tafl games in the room next to the queen eavesdropped and spied on her through a crack. They heard her say that the more widely she yawned, the more she transformed back into a troll, and even as she spoke, she gave a huge yawn, and reverted into the form of a hideous troll-wife. And through the floor of her room appeared her brother, a three-headed giant (þríhöfðaður þussi (Note: The giant greets the troll-woman as his sister. The word for "giant" here is dative "þussi", nominative "þuss", a variant of Þurs. þuss which is difficult to distinguish from a tröll in Old Norse usage.)), who brought her a trough full of meat, which she devoured. (Note: dative "keti"; nominative "kjöti/keti".)

Meanwhile, the boy-prince's wet nurse was about to witness the supernatural appearance of the true queen. When the wet nurse turned the [candle-]light on, (Note: The Icelandic text does not specify the light source. In Hall's retelling, "the nurse had lighted the lamp".) several planks from the floor rose up, and from underneath appeared an astonishingly beautiful white-clad woman, dressed in linen. (Note: Icelandic: undurfríð kona á línklæðum; "hvítklædda kona". Poestion translates the first instance as "wunderschöne Frau in einem Linnenkleide (marvelously beautiful woman in linen garb)" but is not followed by Lang who gave "a beautiful woman dressed in white". Hall's retelling gives "wearing only a single white linen garment".) Clasped around her waist was an iron belt, with a chain leading down into the ground below. The queen embraced the child for a moment, and returned under the floor again. Her appearance was repeated the second night, and the nurse heard the queen say lamentfully that "Two are gone, and one only is left," which the nurse guessed must mean that the third night would be her final appearance.

The next night, King Sigurd was in the nurse's room with a drawn sword in hand, awaiting the woman, whom he instantly recognized as his own wife. He cut the chain in two and great noises came from beneath the earth. The true queen now told her story. The three-headed giant had tried to force her to marry him (actually, to sleep with him), (Note: Icelandic viljað þegar sofa hjá sér "wanted already to sleep with me" as soon as they met. Poestion, who did not bowdlerize, has the queen say: "Dieser wollte sogleich bei mir schlafen".) and at last she consented provided she could visit her son for three consecutive days, hoping for an opportunity to be liberated. The giant must have plummeted to death, the crashing "caused by him in his death throes". The real queen was then restored to all her dignity, and the king had the false queen immediately captured and stoned to death, her body torn apart by horses.

== Retellings ==
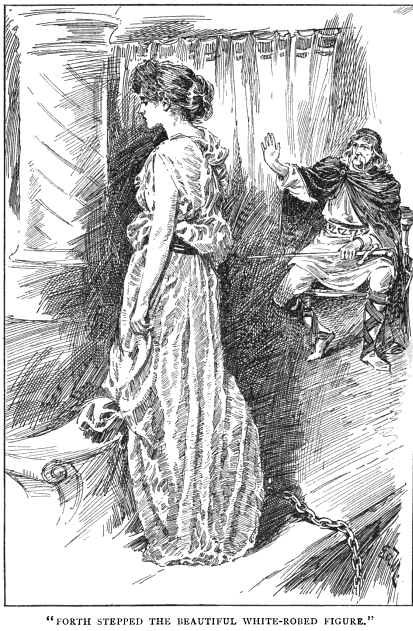
"White-Robed Figure", from "The Giantess and the Granite Boat". —Illustration by E. A. Mason in Hall (1897) Icelandic Fairy Tales.

An embellished retelling was given by Mrs. Angus W. Hall, entitled "The Giantess and the Granite Boat" (1897). Here Sigurd's wife is given the name "Helga", his father-in-law "Hardrada", and the young son "Kurt".

== See also ==
- Brother and Sister
- The Three Little Men in the Wood
- The White Duck
- The Wonderful Birch

== Explanatory notes ==
=== References ===
Citations

Bibliography

- Hall, Mrs. Angus W. (1897). "The Giantess and the Granite Boat". Icelandic Fairy Tales. E. A. Mason (illustr.). London and New York: Frederick Warne. pp. 176–188.
- Jón Arnason, ed. (1864). "Skessan á steinnökkvanum". Íslenzkar Þjóðsögur og Æfintýri. Vol. 2. Leipzig: J. C. Hinrichs. pp. 427–431.
- Lang, Andrew, ed. (1897) [1894]. "The Witch in the Stone Boat". The Yellow Fairy Book. H. J. Ford (illustr.) (3rd ed.). New York and Bombay: Longmans, Green, and Co. pp. 274–278.
- Naumann, Hans, ed. (1923), "24. Die Riesin im Steinboot", Isländische volksmärchen, Ida Naumann (co-translator), Jena: Eugen Diederichs, pp. 102–108
- Poestion, Josef Calasanz [in German], ed. (1884), "XXXV. Die Riesin in dem Steinboote", Isländische Märchen (in German), Wien: C. Gerold, pp. 289–297
- Rittershaus, Adeline, ed. (1902). "XLIV. Die Riesin im Steinboot". Die neuisländischen Volksmärchen (in German). Halle: Max Niemeyer. pp. 188–190.
