= The Son of Seven Mothers =

Indian folktale

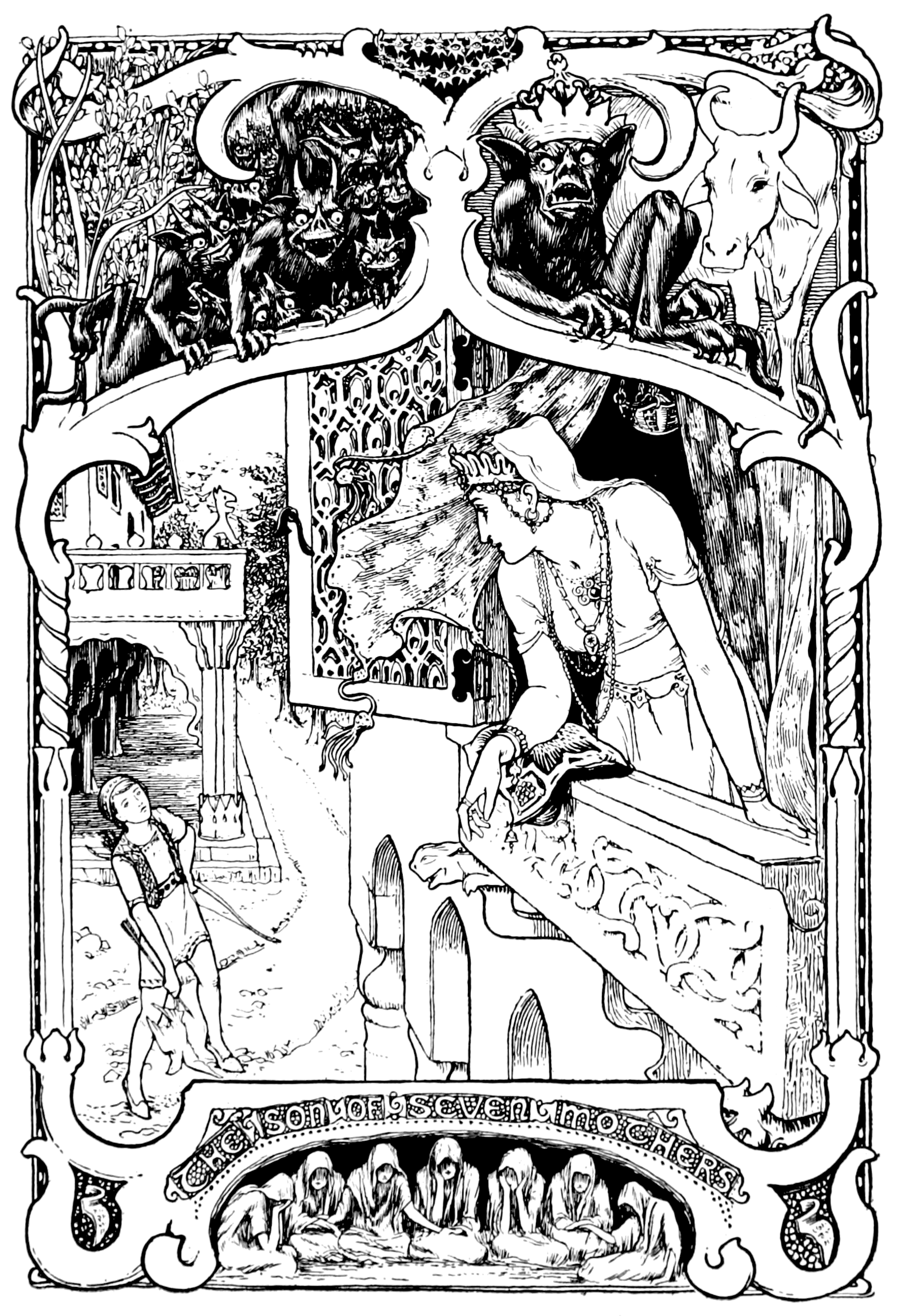
- Illustration by John Batten for Joseph Jacobs's Indian Fairy Tales (1892).

Folk tale
- Name: The Son of Seven Mothers
- Also known as: The Son of Seven Queens
- Aarne–Thompson grouping: ATU 462, "The Outcast Queens and the Ogress Queen"
- Country: India
- Published in: Indian Antiquary Vol. X (1881)
- Related: The Dragon; The Witch in the Stone Boat

The Son of Seven Mothers or The Son of Seven Queens is an Indian folktale, first published in the late 19th century by author Flora Annie Steel. In the tale, a king with many wives marries a demoness who tricks him into banishing his previous wives and cutting out their eyes; they survive and one of the queens gives birth to a son that returns to his father's kingdom, kills the demoness and restores the eyes of the fallen queens.

The tale is classified in the international Aarne-Thompson-Uther Index as ATU 462, "The Outcast Queens and the Ogress Queen". Variants are registered mostly from India, West Asia, and North Africa, with some tales from Hispanic tradition.

== Sources ==
According to R. C. Temple, the tale was collected by author Flora Annie Steel from a Purbia boy who lived in Firozpur, and published in the magazine Indian Antiquary.

== Publication ==
The tale, as Steel had published it, was titled The Son of Seven Mothers. Folklorist Joseph Jacobs republished it in his book Indian Fairy Tales, with the title The Son of Seven Queens.

== Summary ==
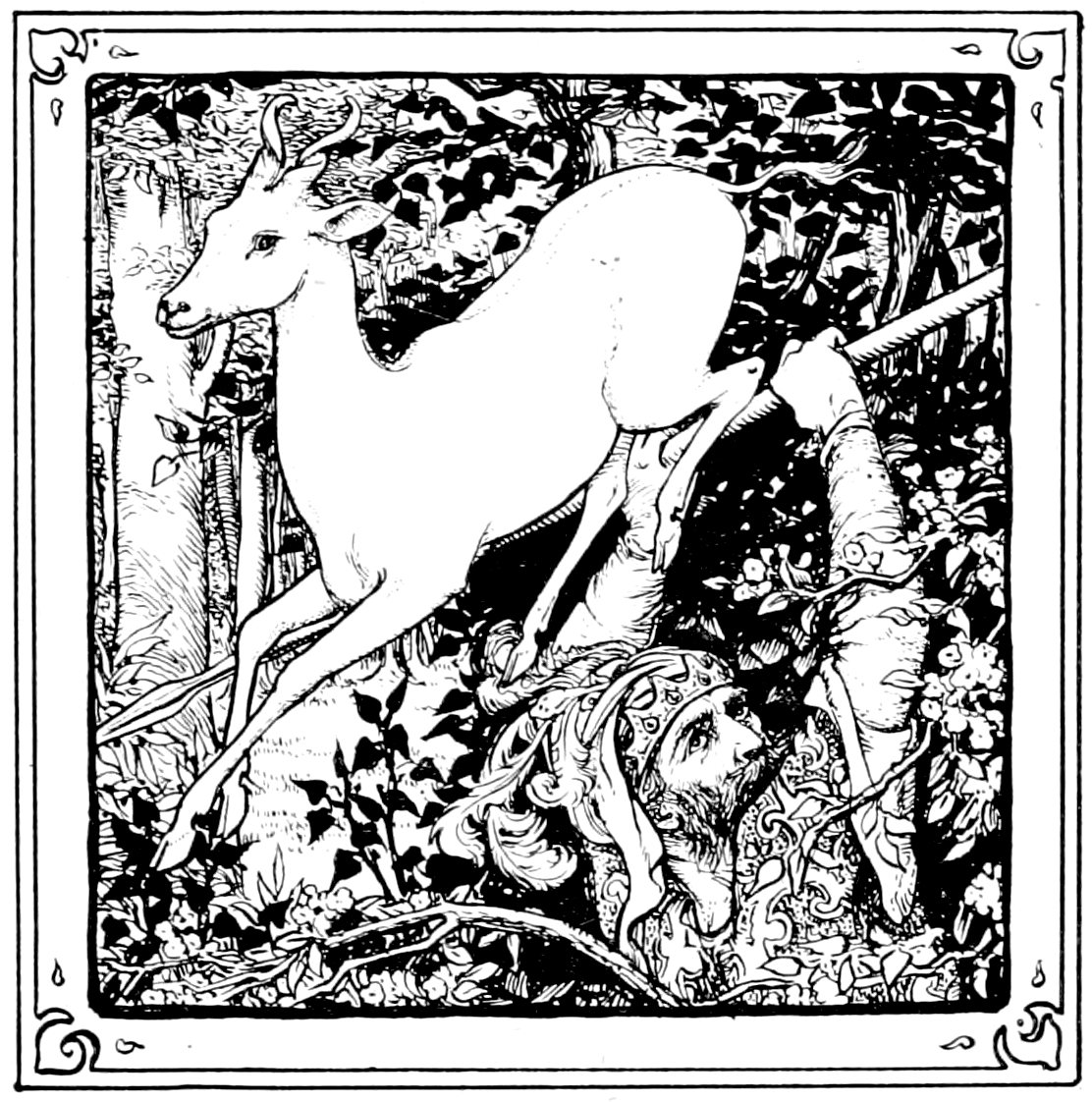
The rajá finds the mysterious white hind in the forest. Illustration by John Batten for Joseph Jacobs's Indian Fairy Tales (1892).

A king has seven wives, but no son yet. A fakir comes to him and predicts that one of his queens shall bear him a son. The king orders preparations for a grand festivity. While everything is being set up, the king goes on a hunt, despite the warnings of one of his wives. He sights a white deer in the woods and becomes transfixed with capturing it. He gallops after it and reaches a miserable hut in the forest.

The king enters the hut and sees an old woman working at the spinning wheel. She calls for her daughter, and a beautiful white-skinned and golden-haired woman. She goes for a drink of water, and, by looking into her eyes, the king realizes she is the white hind. He becomes entranced by her beauty, and wishes to take her as his next wife. She agrees, with the condition that he takes out the eyes of the other queens.

The white hind woman's cruel wish is carried out, and her eyes are given to her mother. The seven queens are cast into prison. While in captivity, one of the queens gives birth to a son, to the jealousy of the others. But soon enough, their jealousy subsides and gives way to care and affection, and the seven women regard the son as their own child.

The boy scrapes the walls of the prison to dig out a hole large enough for him to pass through to the outside and fetch sweetmeats for the imprisoned women. One day, when he is old enough, he begins to hunt bigger game for them with bow and arrow, and meets the wicked queen. She realizes the boy is the son of one of the other queens and tells him she can direct him to get their eyes back. The boy accepts and gets from her a letter, with a command to kill him as soon as he delivers the letter to her mother.

During his journey, the boy arrives at a kingdom whose princess has refused to marry any suitor. When this princess sees the boy, she decides he is the one. The princess reads the letter and alters it with a request for the boy to be treated right. The boy goes to the queen's mother's hut and gets from her the garland of eyes, albeit lacking one. The boy returns home and restores the eyes of the seven queens.

Seeing that her stratagem failed, the white hind queen tells him he can get the "Jogi's wonderful cow, whose milk flows all day long, and makes a pond as big as a kingdom". She also gives him another letter with a command to kill him.

The son of seven queens goes to his bride's kingdom, who alters the second letter. The boy meets the white hind queen's mother, who directs him to follow a road of 18,000 demons, but assuages him to have no fear. The boy takes the Jogi's cow and gives it to his mother and her co-queens.

Lastly, the white hind queen then suggests the boy brings the million-fold rice, that only ripens at night, and gives him a third letter. The boy passes by the princess's kingdom once again, and once again she alter the letter. The boy goes to the witch's hut and she directs him to the field, after a road swarming with 18 million demons. She warns him to get only the tallest ear, and to not look back. The boy walks to the rice fields, plucks the tallest ear, but looks behind him and becomes a pile of ashes.

The witch's mother goes to check on the boy and finds only a pile of ashes. She works to revive the boy back to life and scolds him. The boy returns with the million-fold rice to his seven mothers. With the million-fold rice, he and his seven mothers become the richest people in the kingdom, which expedites his marriage to the princess.

The princess asks her husband, the son of seven mothers, to build a replica of his father's palace, and invite the king. The king comes to his son's palace with the white hind queen and sees the seven queens sat on thrones. The princess, his daughter-in-law, throws herself at his feet and tells the whole story. The white hind's spell on him is broken and, back to sanity, the king orders the execution of the white hind queen, and restores the seven queens to his palace.

== Analysis ==
=== Tale type ===
The tale is classified in the international Aarne-Thompson-Uther Index as tale type ATU 462, "The Outcast Queens and the Ogress Queen": a king with multiple wives finds a beautiful young woman (who is an ogress or demoness in disguise) on a hunt and takes her as his newest wife; the demoness convinces the king to get rid of the previous co-wives, blind them and throw them in a well or pit; the queens each give birth to their respective children, whom they sacrifice to feed the group, save for the youngest queen, whose son she spares; the son they spared grows up, returns to his father's kingdom and meets the demoness queen, who tries to kill him by sending the prince on dangerous quests, but he prevails; he discovers the secret of the demoness queen's life (a bird or a parrot), destroys it and restores his mother and the other queens.

=== Motifs ===
The tale contains the motif Z213, "Hero 'son of seven mothers'", as well as motifs G72.2, "Starving woman abandoned in cave eats newborn child", and L71, "Only youngest of a group of imprisoned women refuses to eat her newborn child".

== Variants ==
According to German ethnologue John Bierhorst, Czech folklorist Jeromír Jech and anthropologist Kirin Narayan, this tale type is "widespread in India", but variants are recorded from China, Chile, Sri Lanka and Herat, Afghanistan. French folklorist Margaret Low reported three versions from Spain, two from Italy, one from Chile, and thirty-four French-Canadian versions.

=== Asia ===
==== India ====
Author Henry Parker noted that variants of the tale of the ogress queen were "well-known" across India, save for Southern India, and that in all tales the Rakshasa Queen is vanquished. In his second revision of the ATU index, folklorist Stith Thompson located 24 variants of the tale type in India. Scholar Heda Jason located a Punjabi variant of the tale type in her 1989 supplement to Thompson and Warren Roberts's Types of Indic Oral Tales. Indian scholar A. K. Ramanujan located variants of the tale type in Bengali, Gondi, Hindi, Kannada, Punjabi, and Telugu. In addition, according to Kannada scholars, tale type 462 ("ವರ್ಗ ೪೬೨", in the original), called "ಧೀರಕುಮಾರ ಕಥೆ" ("Dhīrakumāra kathe"; "Story of Dhirakumara"), is "very popular" in Kannada, being "common" all over Karnataka, from north to the south.

Author Maive Stokes published an Indian variant titled The Demon is at last conquered by the King's Son. In this tale, seven men venture into the woods and find a goat. They take the goat with them. A strange event happens with the men during the following nights: as the men journey on, each night the goat becomes a she-demon and devours one of them, until there is only two of them. The two survivors injure the she-demons and abandon it there. The she-demon becomes a beautiful human woman and lures a passing king. The she-demon marries the king. At night, she eats his animals and places her knives in the bed of the king's other queens. The she-demon blames the seven queens for the deed and the king orders for them to have their eyes gouged out and abandoned in the jungle. The seven queens wander through the jungle and fall into a dry well. Each of the queens gives birth to a child and sacrifices the baby to feed herself and the others, save for the seventh queen. She spares her son and she, with the other queens, raises the boy. When he is five years old, he climbs out of the well to find food and water for his mother and the other queens. The she-demon queen, due to her powers, realizes the seven queens are living in the well, and feigns illness and demands the boy brings her some tigress's milk for her eyes. The prince takes up the task and demands a large sum of money as payment. He takes the seven queens from the well, buys a small house for them and hires some servants to help them. The prince saves a tiger cub and its mother gives them its milk. The she-demon queen then demands an eagle's feather. For this task, the prince kills a snake to protect a nest of eaglets. Their eagle parents give him a feather. Next, the she-demon queen asks for night-growing rice, which only her brother has. She gives the prince a letter to be delivered to her brother, with a command to kill the boy. He passes by a fakir's house, who alter the letter with a request for the boy to be treated with the utmost respect by the she-demons's brother, and so it happens. The prince also finds the beautiful daughter of the raksasha, He kills her raksasha father by killing a mainá bird, and takes her with him. Lastly, the she-demon demands water from the Glittering Well from the fairies' country, which the prince obtains. At the end of the tale, the prince reveals to the king that he is his son and the seven queens are alive, and asks the king to kill the she-demon queen. The king drops the she-demon in the jungle well and the prince and his king's servants shoot her dead.

Stokes also indicated another Indian variant, Brave Hirálálbásá. In this tale, a king named Mánikbásá Rájá, or the Ruby King, has seven wives and seven sons. One day, he walks by the woods, and a Raksasha turns into a Rani to lure him. The king falls in love with her and takes her as his eighth wife. Every night, the raksasha queen devours the king's animals and blames the seven queens. The king orders them to be blinded and cast them in a great hole. Six of the queens eat their children, but the seventh spares hers. For her action, God sends her food to share with the other queens. The boy grows up and climbs out of the hole. His seven mothers warn him not to go to his father's kingdom, but he does and the Raksasha Rani hires him as her servant. She sends him for some rosewater from the country of the Raksashas with a letter. In the country of the Raksashas, he meets a princess named Sonahrí Rání ("the Golden Rání"), with golden teeth and golden hair, kidnapped by the raksashas from he father, Sondarbásá Rájá,'s garden. Sonahrí Rani discovers the letter contains a command to kill the boy, and writes a new letter. The boy gets the rosewater and brings it to the raksasha raní. She then sends him for flowers and gives him another letter with a command to kill him. The boy passes by Sonahrí Raní's house, who alters the letter again. The prince Hiralal talks to a raksasha-grandmother and gets from her an ointment and a jar with the seven queens' eyes. He returns home and restores the queens' sight, and brings the flowers to the Raksasha-Raní. The wicked queen gives him a third letter and a request for a sári from the country of Raksashas. Sonahrí Raní alters the third letter. Hiralal tricks the Raksasha-grandmotehr into giving him a bird - a cockatoo - that contains the soul of the Raksasha-Raní. He kills the Raksasha that kidnapped Sonahrí Raní, and takes her with him as his bride. Hiralal rescues the seven queens from the hole and buys a mansion for them as his bride. Hiralal gives the Raksasha-Raní a bunch of flowers instead of the sári she asked. Hiralal then convinces his father to build an iron house and lure the Raksasha-Rani inside. After the Raksasha-Rani is locked inside the iron house, Hiralal takes out the cockatoo and shows it to the wicked queen, who turns into a monster in a state of panic. Hiralal wrung the bird's neck, and the Raksasha-Rani dies at last. Hiralal reveals the whole truth to his father. The king asks for the queens' forgiveness and restores them to their proper places.

British reverend James Hinton Knowles published a Kashmiri variant with the title The Ogress-Queen. In this tale, a king has seven wives, but no son. One day, he finds a beautiful fairy in the woods. The fairy offers to fulfill the king's fondest wish (to have a son), in exchange for marrying him. The fairy marries the king, and his seven co-wives become pregnant. The fairy, actually a rakshasí, goes out at night to eat the animals in the stable. The king's servants notice the animals' disappearance, and the fairy says she can find the culprit. She kills a sheep and smears the mouths of the seven co-wives and blames the incidents on them. Fooled by the trick, the king orders the queens to be blinded and to be buried in a dry well outside the city. Down in the well, to stave off hunger, six of the queens offer their own child to feed the others, but the seventh spares her own son, and raises him in the well. After 6 years, the queens take the boy out of the well; he steals food from the palace for himself and for the other queens. One day, the cook has to go away for his mother's cremation, and lets the boy cook the food for the king. The king eats the food the boy prepared and compliments the cook's dish, but the cook tells him the boy was the one who did it. The king becomes fond of the boy. Years later, the boy meets the wicked queen, and naïvely reveals her his whole life story. The wicked queen feigns illness and says she needs tigress's milk, which the boy can fetch for her. The boy finds a tigress, who gives him her milk and tells him that the wicked queens is a raksashí, on whom her milk will have no effect. Next, the wicked queens wants a special medicine that her grandfather - another raksasha - has. Lastly, the wicked queen sends the boy with a false letter to ask her grandmother for a comb. A helpful fakir, who has warned the boy, changes the letter. With the fakir's new letter, the boy passes himself as the raksashi's son and learns from the grandmother about the external souls of the entire raksasha family. While the raksasha grandmother is taking a bath, the boy destroys the recipient of her soul and her sons', but keeps the external soul of the raksashí queen - a starling - with him in a cage, and steals eye-medicine. He then goes to the well to give the eye-medicine to his mother and the other queens, and helps them out of the well. The retinue goes to the king's court. The boy shows the king the starling and reveals that his eighth wife has been a raksashí all along. He destroys the bird and the wicked queen falls dead.

Lal Behari Day published a Bengali tale titled The Boy whom Seven Mothers suckled. In this tale, a king has seven queens, but no son. A holy mendicant tells him to a mango tree in the forest whose mangoes can grant fertility to his queens. The king takes the mangoes home with him and gives them to his seven wives. They all eat the fruits and become pregnant. One day, he finds a young lady of "peerless beauty" - in truth, a raksasha - and marries her. As proof of his love for her, she demands the other queens are blinded and killed. The king consents to her wish and orders the execution of the seven queens. The minister only blinds them, and hides them in a cave uphill. Inside the cave, the queens each give birth to their children, and six of the babies are sacrificed to feed the others. The seventh queen, however, spares her son and tells the others she will nurse him. The other queens also agree to suckle the boy, and he grows up "the hardiest and strongest boy that ever lived". Meanwhile, the raksashí queen begins to eat the entire royal family, and the palace's servants - even the cook - to sate her rapacious appetite. With no more cook to prepare him the food, the boy takes up the job, while also avoiding any attempt of the raksashi queen to devour him. Until one day, when the raksashi queen gives him a letter and sends him to her mother to get her a melon twelve cubits long. Realizing the mission is a trap, the boy tears up the letter and visits the raksashí queen's mother, across the ocean. The boy notices a bird in a cage, and the raksashí tells him it contains the soul of the raksashí queen. While the monsters are away foraging for food, the boy takes the caged bird with him and returns with the melon to the king's palace. Some time later, the people tell the king "a monstrous bird" has been devouring the citizens, so much so that the town is almost desolate. The boy promises the king he will find the culprit, and says that the queen must be in the same room as him. The boy brings the caged bird to the court, reveals the queen is a raksashí, and strangles the bird, so that the raksashí queen falls dead immediately. The king restores the seven co-queens.

In a tale titled The Tale of the Wicked Stepmother Queen, four men travel to the woods and find a goat. The goat is secretly an ogress and eats two of them. The other escape and the ogress changes into a human girl. A king passes by the forest, finds the girl, and takes her with him to be his newest queen, after his ten other wives. After he marries the ogress, the horses keep disappearing, to the king's distress. The ogress queen promises to find the culprit. That night, the ogress puts a lump of flesh in front of the door of each wife to blame them for the horse killings. The king falls for the trick and the ogress queen orders the ten queens to be blinded and thrown in a well in a desolate jungle somewhere. The cruel orders are carried out and the queens are thrown down the well. Each of them is pregnant and gives birth to a son that is sacrificed to feed the others. The tenth queen refuses to eat any part, and spares her own son. This turns out to be a blessing in disguise: the tenth queen's son leaves the well to gather food for the others, and is found by the king, who gives him a golden arrow and a bow, and tries to hire him. The boy reports to his mother in the well, and she tells him the man is his fathe, the king. The mother allows the boy to leave with his father, but warns of the danger the ogress queen poses to him. The ogress queen realizes the boy is the son of the other queen, and hatches a plan to get rid of him. She feigns illness and requests a list of increasingly dangerous demands: first, she asks for tigress's milk; then, for a cow unlike the king has ever seen; thirdly, for water of gold from her ogress mother. On the third quest, the ogress queen gives the boy a letter to be given to her mother, with a command to kill and devour the boy. The boy stops to rest in the woods, and Adam and Eve alter the letter for one with a kinder request. The boy takes the letter to the letter to the ogress, and is greeted like a son by the creature. The boy discover on a shelf a box with the eyes of the ten queens - which means their sight can be restored - and a parrot in a cage - the soul of the ogress queen. The boy takes the box with the eyes and the parrot cage and returns home. He goes to the king's court and shows the parrot to the ogress queen, who begs for the boy to give her the parrot. The prince breaks the parrot's legs, wings and neck, which finally kills the ogress queen.

Indian scholar A. K. Ramanujan published a tale titled Ogress Queen. In this tale, two brothers live together. They begin to notice the disappearance of their animals, and the ogress devours the older brother. The younger brother escapes and the ogress turns into a beautiful woman. A king passes by the woods, sees the woman, and the brother warns him that she is an ogress. The king pays him a hefty sum of money and takes her with him as his third wife. The king's second wife is pregnant, and takes part in a kubusa, or Blouse Ceremony. The ogress queen brings her a present, and suggests a custom: to put kohl on the future mother's eyes. The ogress queen poisons the kohl and the second queen becomes blind in both eyes, and the elder queen loses the sight in one eye. The ogress queen mocks their state to the king, who banishes them to the jungle. Both women are taken in by an old man, and the younger queen gives birth to a son. The boy grows up and goes to his father's city. The ogress queen realizes the boy is the son of the other queen, feigns illness and asks for the king to send the boy for some headache pills from her mother. The boy meets the ogress's mother and learns about a sight-restoring ointment and that the ogress queen's life lies in a parrot. The boy takes the ointment for his mother and steals the parrot, then kills the parrot in front of the king and the ogress queen.

Kirin Narayan published the tale The Devouring Demoness, collected from a Kangra teller. In this tale, a Brahman and his Brahmani wife have two sons. They are poor, but have their own fields and cattle. A goat they own - actually, a demoness in disguise - eats the two sons, then the Brahmani wife, and, finally, sets his eyes on the Brahman. Luckily, he escapes her fury by running to the jungle and climbing a tree, while the demoness tries to eat him. She changes into a beautiful woman and tries to entice him. Suddenly, a king passes by the tree and, seeing the demoness's disguise, offers to buy her from the Brahman. The king then takes her to his palace and marries her as his newest queen. At night, however, she leaves her quarters and begins to devour the horses at the stables, elephants and any other animal. She blames the king's other queens and orders her to be punished by being cast in a dug up well. The orders are carried out and the three queens are roped down to the well. Since they are pregnant and have no food, two of them give birth to their babies and eat them to sate their hunger, but te third spares hers and raises him. Some years later, some cowherds notice the women and the boy at the well, and rescue them, but have to rope them back at night. Later, the boy discovers he is the son of the king and his step-mother is a demoness, whose life is hidden in a parrot in the land of the demons. With this knowledge, the boy goes to the King's palace. The demoness queen, realizing his true identity, feigns illness and asks for remedy from the land of demons: a stalk of rice grains and gray buffalo's milk to prepare her a special food. The boy goes to the land of demons and pretends to be the demoness's son in order to infiltrate her family's household, get the items and the parrot and return to his true mother and the other victimized queens. The boy takes the parrot's cage to the palace and shows it to the king and the demoness. She prepares to attack the boy, but he breaks the parrot's members one by one until he wrings the bird's neck, killing the demoness in the process.

In a Tamil tale collected by professor Stuart Blackburn with the title The Raksasi-Queen, a king has a previous wife and marries a Raksasi that disguised herself as a young woman. At night, the Raksasi returns to her demonic form and eats animals like horses and elephants around the palace, then blames the human co-queen. The human queen is blinded and thrown in jail. Since she is pregnant, she gives birth to a son in prison and raises him. When the grows up, the boy hears stories of his mother's false accusations and makes a vow to discover the truth. He learns the Raksasi assumed his mother's form, and goes to her sister's house. He meets a human princess that is being kept prisoner by the Raksasi's sister to be devoured, and both conspire to learn of the life-index of both Raksasis. The Raksasi queen's sister reveals their secret: their souls are hidden in the shape of bees protected by bhutas in a banyan tree on an island beyond seven seas. The prince swims to the island, climbs the banyan tree and captures the bees in a box, then returns to the Raksasi's sister's house. He defeats one of the bees by transforming into a bee, then shapeshifts into a flying horse and takes the human princess with him to the place where his mother is to be executed. The prince stops the execution and crushes the other bee, indicating it belongs to the Raksasi queen. The prince releases his mother from the executioner's noose and replaces her eyes.

==== Iran ====
In his Catalogue of Persian Folktales, German scholar Ulrich Marzolph located one Iranian variant, from Khorassan, which he classified as 462, "Die vertossenen Köninginnen und die Div-Frau" ("The Outcast Queens and the Div-Woman").

==== Turkey ====
Professor Susan Hoogasian-Villa reported a Turkish tale collected by folklorist Naki Tezel. In this tale, the hero is sent on a quest for figs, dev's milk and fairy cradle as remedies for his stepmother. He eventually breaks the external soul of his step-mother and restores the sight of the king's forty blinded wives.

==== Palestine ====
Scholars Ibrahim Muhawi and Sharif Kanaana collected an Arab Palestinian tale titled Dibbit il-mitbax ("Bear-Cub of the Kitchen"). A king has three wives, but no son. One day, a mosquito lodges itself in his nose. The insect reveals it is a female djinni, and offers to marry him in exchange for her doing whatever she wants to the other queens. The king takes the djinni woman as his fourth wife, as the other queens become pregnant. The djnni wife orders for the eyes of the queens to be taken out and dropped in a well. The three queens are exiled to a well, and sacrifice their sons to feed the others, but the eldest queen spares hers, with the argument that her son may by useful to them. The boy is suckled by the three queens and grows up in the well. He digs up a hole in the well and reaches the king's kitchen. He steals food for his mother and the other queens, and puts salt in the food. He is caught by the king's cook and is mockingly named "Bear-Cub of the Kitchen". One day, the wicked queen feigns illness and wants a pomegranate from Wadi is-Sib ("Valley of Oblivion", according to Muhawi and Kanaana). Next, she sends him for a medicine in "such and such a place". Bear-Cub of the Kitchen goes to "such-and-such-a-place" and finds the wicked queen's sister. He learns that the queen and her family hide their lifeforce in some flasks, next to an eye-medicine and the eyes of the three queens. Bear-Cub of the Kitchen destroys the flask with the sister's lifeforce, killing her, and steers the castle with magic ropes to his father's palace. Bear-Cub of the Kitchen takes the flask with the queen's lifeforce and "cracks her neck". He then restores his mother's eyes and the other queens'.

=== Africa ===
Scholar Hasan M. El-Shamy reports variants of tale type 462 in North Africa, namely, in Tunisia and Algeria.

Author Guillaume Spitta-Bey collected an Egyptian Arab tale titled Histoire d'Ours de cuisine ("Tale of the Kitchen Bear"). In this tale, a king owns a fountain in his garden where a maiden with a feathery robe likes to bathe. One night, the king, taken with passion for the girl, fetches her garments from a nearby tree and intends to make her his bride. She consents, on the condition that the king blinds his forty queens. The king blinds the 40 co-queens and takes them to a basement under the kitchen. Each of them gives birth to a child that is sacrificed to feed the others, until the fortieth woman, who decides to spare hers. She names her son Mohammed L'Avisé ("Clever Mohammed"). The boy climbs out of the basement and steals food for his mother and the other women. He eventually becomes the cook's assistant and prepares a dish for the king. Mohammed L'Avisé lies that his name is "Kitchen Bear". The wicked queen feigns illness and tells the king she needs the heart of a bull that lives in the black valley. Next, she demands the heart of a bull from the red valley, then for a heavy pomegranate that weighs a half-cantar (a weight measure), found in the white valley, and lastly for a floating castle that lies beyond Mount Qaf. Mohammed L'Avisé fetches the hearts and the pomegranate, and goes to the floating castle by pretending to be a relative of the ogres. He learns in the floating castle about the secret of the king's newest wife: she hides her lifeforce inside a flask, which lies next to a vial containing the eyes of the 40 queens. Mohammed L'Avisé takes the flasks with him and transports the floating castle with him. He goes to the king's court and shows him the vial with the eyes of the 40 queens, and smashes in the ground the flask with the wicked queen's lifeforce. Orientalist E. A. Wallis Budge translated it as The Story of the Bear-of-the-Kitchen. Hasan El-Shamy notes that, while this is a singular attestation of tale type 462 in Egypt from the 19th century, other variants are found in the Levant Coast and in Sudan.

=== Europe ===
==== Spain ====
Spanish academic Ángel Hernandez Hernandez located a Spanish variant from Murcia, which he titled La reina repudiada y la bruja reina ("The repudiated queen and the witch queen"): the king blinds his own wife and throws her in prison; while in captivity, she gives birth to a son; the son catches a bird for his father's new wife and, later, destroys the bird, which also destroys the new queen. Similarly, Catalan scholars Carme Oriol and Josep Pujol in their index of Catalan rondallas ('fairy tales'), register tale type 462, La reina eixorbada ("The Blinded Queen"): a king has seven sons with his queen, but threatens to blind her if another boy is born; an eighth son is born, thus the king makes true on his promise, blinds his queen and immures her with her son, then remarries; the son escapes to find food in the king's castle, is discovered and soon hired as a servant; the second queen, jealous of the attention, sends the boy on dangerous quests, intenting on killing him; the boy eventually finds a magical remedy and heals his mother's eyes.

=== Latin America ===
Chilean folklorist Ramón Laval collected a variant from a 12-year-old teller, titled Las Siete Cegas ("The Seven Blind Women"): a cruel king marries seven women, in succession, and lives with each wife. He becomes increasingly bored with each one, then blinds and imprisons her. The seven former queens give birth to sons while in prison, and, to sate their hunger, six of them sacrifice their children to provide food for the others, save for the first queen. She spares her son and raises him. After a few years, the boy goes out of prison through a hole and gathers food for his mother and the other women. This goes on for some time, until the king notices his presence and takes him under his wing, much to the irritation of king's newest and eighth wife, a bitter and jealous woman. Intent on have the boy killed by some means, she sends him to get leche de leona ("lioness's milk") to cure her, and later for singing towers and ringing bells. Folklorist Terrence Hansen, in his catalogue of Latin American folktales, classified the tale as a new subtype he created, type **455A.

== See also ==
- The Blue Belt
- The Death of Koschei the Deathless
- The Giant Who Had No Heart in His Body
- The Jezinkas
- The Twelve Sisters

== Bibliography ==
- Low, Margaret (1985). "The Motif of the External Soul in French-Canadian Folktales". In Edith Fowke (ed.). Explorations in Canadian folklore. Toronto: McClelland and Stewart. pp. 266–276.
