= Dead woman =

Dead woman may refer to:

== Geography ==
- Dead Woman's Pass, a mountain pass in the Peruvian Andes
- Dead Woman's Ditch, a linear earthwork in Dowsborough Camp, Somerset, UK
- La Mujer Muerta (The Dead Woman), a mountain range in the Sistema Central, Spain
- Dead Woman Mountain, Morocco (Montaña de la Mujer Muerta), a mountain near Ceuta, close to the North African Coast
- Turó de la Dona Morta (Dead Woman hill), a mountain near Maçanet de la Selva, Catalonia, Spain
- Dead Women Crossing, a small community in Custer County, Oklahoma, U.S.
- Torre de la Malmuerta (Tower of the Bad Death Woman), a gate tower in Córdoba, Spain

== Screen and theatre ==
- Dead Woman from Beverly Hills (Die Tote von Beverly Hills), a 1964 West German drama film
- "Dead Woman's Shoes", a 1985 episode from the U.S. television series The Twilight Zone
- A Dead Woman on Holiday, a play by British playwright Julia Pascal

== See also ==
- Dead girl (disambiguation)
- List of mountain ranges in the world named The Sleeping Lady
- Deadman Hills
