= Hanuman and the Five Riders =

1975 film by Sompote Sands

- Thai theatrical release poster
- Directed by: Sompote Sands
- Produced by: Sompote Sands
- Starring: Yodchai Meksuwan; Tanyarat Lohanan; Pipop Pupinyo; Kaan Boonchoo
- Music by: Sanit Siriwisut (songs); Meesak Nakarat (songs)
- Production company: Chaiyo Productions
- Distributed by: Chaiyo Productions (Thailand); Shaw Brothers Studio (International)
- Release date: March 15, 1975 (Thailand)
- Running time: 106 minutes
- Country: Thailand
- Languages: Thai; Japanese

Hanuman and the Five Riders (หนุมาน พบ 5 ไอ้มดแดง - Hanuman pob Har Aimoddaeng - literally "Hanuman meet the Five Ant Men") is a Thai tokusatsu superhero film produced in 1975 by Chaiyo Productions of Thailand, founded by Sompote Sands. The film partially and legally utilizes footage from the Japanese Kamen Rider X film Five Riders vs. King Dark, and although it has never officially been released in Japan, Kamen Rider fans refer to it as Hanuman and the 5 Kamen Riders (ハヌマーンと5人の仮面ライダー, Hanumān to Gonin no Kamen Raidā). It is a sequel to The 6 Ultra Brothers vs. the Monster Army, another film featuring Japanese tokusatsu heroes teaming up with Hanuman.

== Plot ==
The five Kamen Riders begin to uncover a plan lead by the evil King Dark, who needs to drink the fresh blood of young women to live. He brings back from hell the wicked bandit Kaan as a henchmen and orders him to capture the scientist Dr. Wisut and his girlfriend Julie. Once both were persuaded into arriving, King Dark threatens to drain Julie's blood unless Dr. Wisut uses his knowledge and technology to create an army of monsters to confront the five Riders. When the Riders are killed, the Hindu god Hanuman revives them and joins their side to save the doctor, his girlfriend, and the young women. Once saved, Hanuman engages in a final duel with King Dark and sends Kaan to hell once again.

== Production ==
Previously, Chaiyo collaborated with Tsuburaya Productions to create two fully official co-productions in 1974 (namely The 6 Ultra Brothers Vs. the Monster Army and Jumborg Ace & Giant). The production began initially when Sompote Sands approached Toei Company, Ltd., which produced the Kamen Rider shows, for the rights to utilize footage from Five Riders vs. King Dark in their own film, which was accepted. However, due to a mistake on Sands' part, he had forgotten to license out the characters from Ishinomori Productions, making the film semi-official. In the end, no legal action from Toei was ever charged against Sands or Chaiyo due to legal problems in Thailand regarding international copyright.

== Cast ==
- Yodchai Meksuwan as Dr. Wisut
- Tanyarat Lohanan as Julie
- Pipop Pupinyo as King Dark
- Kaan Boonchoo as Kaan / Hanuman
- Yupon Thammasiri as Hanuman (voice)
- Prida Somthobsuuk as Bandit
- Jan Wanpen as Bandit
- Ryo Hayami as Keisuke Jin / Kamen Rider X (archive footage)
- Hiroshi Fujioka as Takeshi Hongo / Kamen Rider #1 (archive footage)
- Takeshi Sasaki as Hayato Ichimonji / Kamen Rider #2 (archive footage)
- Hiroshi Miyauchi as Shiro Kazami / Kamen Rider V3 (archive footage)
- Takehisa Yamaguchi Joji Yuki / Riderman (archive footage)
- Akiji Kobayashi as Tobei Tachibana (archive footage)
- Sanit Kaewadee as Koh (archive footage)
