= Dead Girl =

Dead Girl(s) may refer to:

- Dead Girl (comics), a comic book character
- Dead Girl (film), a 1996 film by Adam Coleman Howard
- "Dead Girl", a song by Acid Bath from Paegan Terrorism Tactics
- Deadgirl, a 2008 horror film
- Dead Girls (novel), a 1992 novel by Richard Calder
- Dead Girls (short story collection), a 2002 short story collection by Nancy Lee
- The Dead Girl, a 2006 film
- The Dead Girl (1990), a true crime book by Melanie Thernstrom
- "The Dead Girls", a song by Orchestral Manoeuvres in the Dark from the album The Pacific Age
- The Dead Girls, a 2025 limited Netflix Series
- Las muertas, a 1977 novel by Jorge Ibargüengoitia, published in English as The Dead Girls
- Chicas muertas, a 2014 book by Selva Almada, published in English as Dead Girls

== See also ==
- Dead woman (disambiguation)
