= Sleeping Beauty Mountain (Kalinga) =

- Mount Patukan; Mount Mating-oy Dinayao; Mount Mantingoy
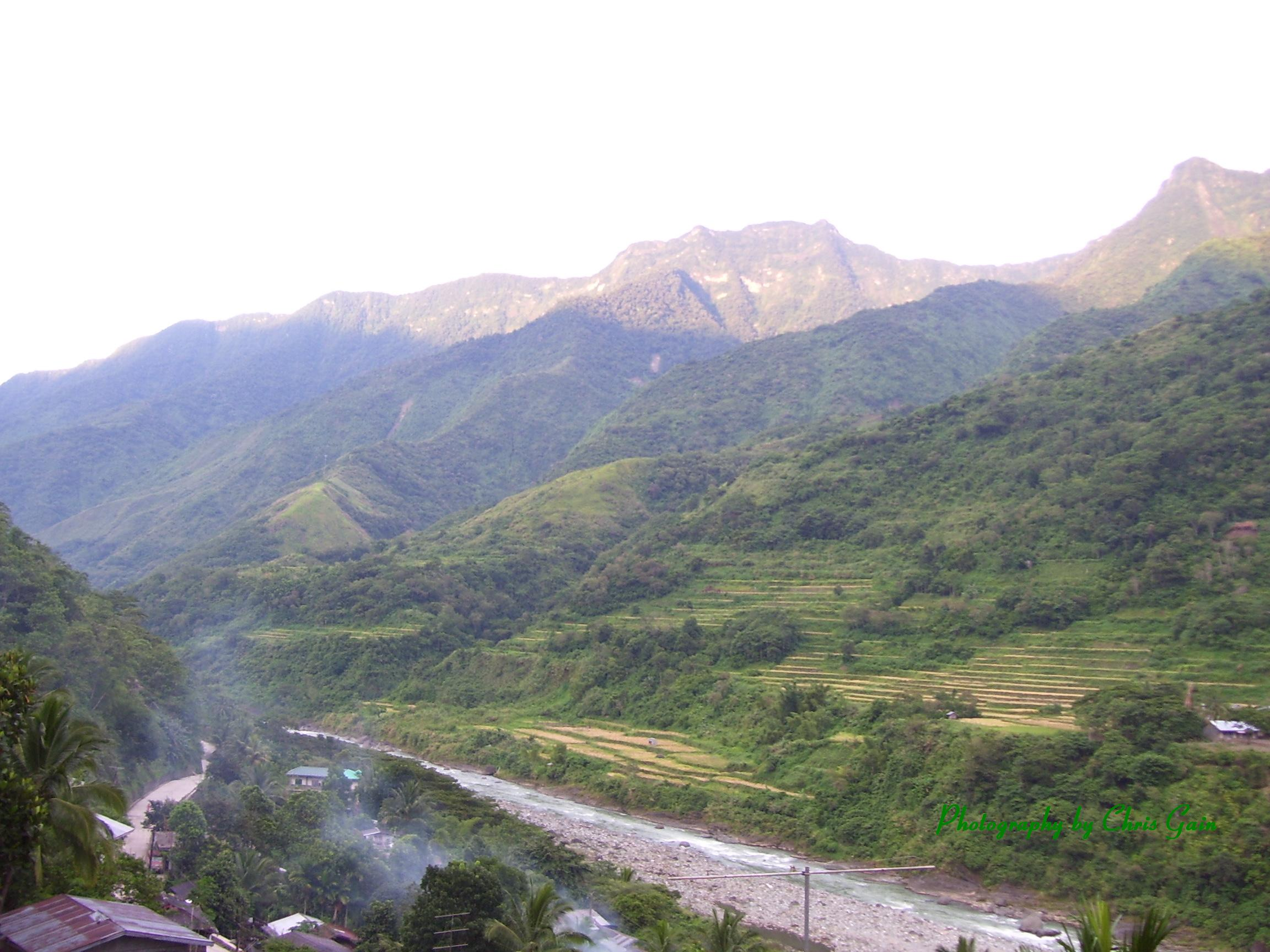
- Sleeping Beauty, as viewed from Tinglayan at sunset in July 2008

Highest point
- Elevation: 1,906 m (6,253 ft)
- Prominence: 201 m (659 ft)
- Coordinates: 17°15′44″N 121°11′0″E

Geography
- Location within Philippines
- Location: Province of Kalinga, Philippines

Geology
- Mountain type: Mountain ridge

Climbing
- Easiest route: Lubo Tanudan Trail

Sleeping Beauty Mountain (also known as Mount Patukan, Mount Mating-oy Dinayao, Mount Mantingoy) is a mountain ridge in Kalinga province of the Philippines. The mountain is called as such because the silhouette of the northern ridge resembles a sleeping woman. It is usually best viewed from the west near the municipality Tinglayan in the Chico River valley, but it can also be viewed from the east near Tanudan.

Mount Patukan (in the Lubo dialect of Tanudan) is the forehead and highest point of 'Sleeping Beauty.' The ridge is located between the municipalities of Tanudan and Tinglayan. The mountain is known as Mount Mating-oy Dinayao in the Tinglayan dialect.

== The Legend of Sleeping Beauty ==
There is a folkloric legend regarding the mountain, passed on for several generations. The tale is one of Kalinga’s most loved bedtime stories popularly sang in the native ballad called Ullalim. The tale of two lovers ended by a tribal war has different versions, depending on the tribe where the story originated, the name of the protagonists are different, but with only slight variation in the story. One version of the story is about Lubting and Mawanga; one, about Dinayao and Binsay; and the other, Edonsan and Banna - all ending with the female protagonist resting on Patukan, in despair, after the loss of her loved one.

== See also ==
- The Sleeping Lady
