= Phnom Kong Rei =

Mountain range in Kampong Chhnang Province, Cambodia

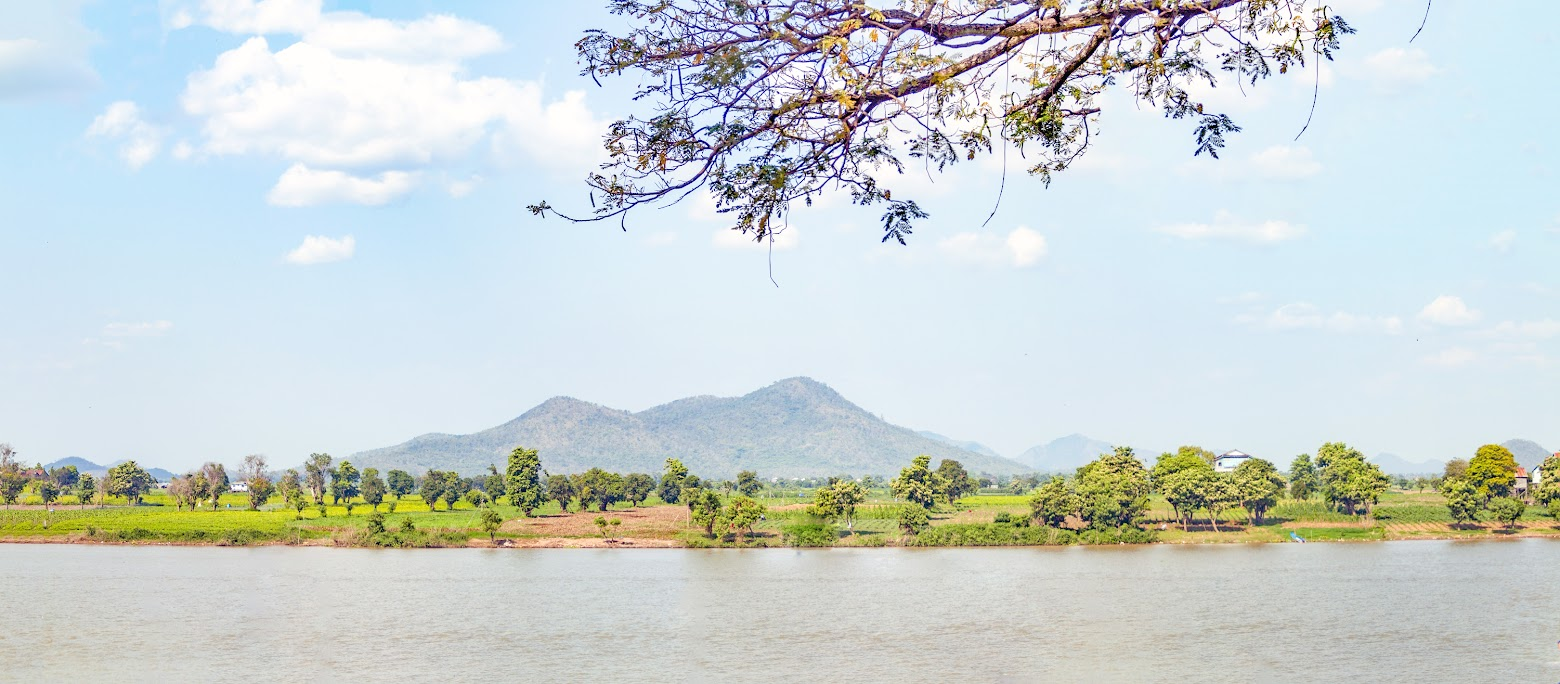
- A Panorama shot of Phnom Kong Rei viewed from Phsar Krom

Highest point
- Elevation: 310 m (1,020 ft)
- Listing: List of mountain ranges in the world named The Sleeping Lady
- Coordinates: 12°18′55″N 104°42′52″E

Geography
- Location within Cambodia
- Location: Kampong Chhnang Province, Cambodia

Geology
- Mountain type: sandstone

Climbing
- Easiest route: Drive

Phnom (Neang) Kong Rei or Kong Rei Mountain (Khmer: ភ្នំនាងកង្រី) is a mountain range in Kampong Chhnang Province, Cambodia.

== Geography ==
Phnom Kong Rei is a small isolated range of moderate height lying north of Kampong Chhnang city. The range stretches for about 4.5 km in a WNW - ESE direction and is a conspicuous local landmark located north of the town across the Tonle Sap River.

Its highest point is 310 m and its silhouette seen from afar rising above the flat landscape looks like a sleeping lady.

It is one of the main tourist spots in Kampong Chhnang Province, particularly during Khmer New Year. Along with sightseers, the mountain attracts spiritually motivated laymen and women who come to pray and meditate.

At the base of the mountain there is a hut for resident Buddhist monks and lay followers to do prayer and meditation. Leading from the hut to the top of the mountain is a path named Plov sdach (the King's path).

While in previous decades a hike up the mountain involved the potential risk of encounters with tigers and other animals, the area is now sadly denuded of wildlife.

== Legends ==
Named after Kong Rei, the beautiful daughter of the ogress in the Khmer folk tale of the Twelve Sisters (Khmer: Puthisen Neang Kong Rei), this mountain is important in Cambodian culture. The people who live in Kampong Chhnang Province believe that the Kong Rei mountain range is the legendary lady at rest and warn their children to not eat leaf vegetables from the mountain because they could be Kong Rei's hair.

Chan Pav, 40, a resident of Trabek village at the mountain's base, says that Kong Rei's attraction for spiritually-minded visitors are caves that possess strong spiritual power. While Pav said that spiritual power noticeably decreased during the Pol Pot regime, recent peace and stability had put it on an upward trend. "The scientists seem not to believe in spirit power, but we here must believe in it because it is true," he said. "This mountain requires [visitors to express] the truth. If not [they] will get trouble.

There is also a Khmer song based on the legend of the mountain written by Mae Bon and sung by Ros Sereysothea.

== See also ==
- The Twelve Sisters
