= Crocodile (1980 film) =

- DVD cover.
- Directed by: Sompote Sands; Lee Won-se
- Written by: Chali Iaimkrasin; Yeo Su-jung; Yu Yeol
- Produced by: Dick Randall; Robert Chan; Sompote Sands; Pridi Oonchitti
- Starring: Nat Puvanai; Ni Tien; Angela Wells; Kirk Warren; Robert Chan
- Cinematography: Jung Il-sung; Park Seung-bae
- Production companies: Chaiyo Productions; Hanjin Enterprises Company; Spectacular Trading International
- Distributed by: Chaiyo Productions (Thailand); Herman Cohen Productions (US)
- Release dates: February 15, 1980 (Thailand); November 18, 1981 (United States)
- Running time: 100 minutes (Thai version); 92 minutes (International version)
- Countries: Thailand; Hong Kong; South Korea
- Language: Thai

Crocodile is a 1980 Thai monster film directed by Sompote Sands.

== Plot ==
Tony Akom (Nat Puvani) and John Stromm (Min Oo) are two doctors working at Bangkok. Though Tony is happily married and John is engaged, their spouses are often bitter at them since both doctors overwork, frequently leaving home at night to attend the hospital. One weekend, as both couples vacation in Pattaya, the women are mysteriously killed in the water. After examining their remains and going through newspaper articles, Tony discovers the killer is a giant crocodile, possibly mutated by recent atomic bomb testings in the ocean. Swearing revenge on the creature, Tony and John enlist the help of fisherman Tanaka (Manop Asavatep), who lends his boat to pursue the monster.

After the crocodile demolishes a riverside village, authorities set an enormous underwater trap for it, but the plan ultimately fails. Tony, John and Tanaka head to the sea, attempting to lure the crocodile into their path by baiting him with chemical compounds. They are joined in the search by Peter, a photographer who wants to get the scoop on the crocodile's destruction. That night, the crocodile attacks their boat, killing Tanaka. Tony and John open fire at the creature, wounding it, but the crocodile retaliates, crashing into the ship and causing it to sink. John is killed in the process, while Peter straps himself with dynamite and swims into the crocodile's jaws. The monster is destroyed in a giant explosion, presumably killing all on board.

== Versions ==
The international version produced by Dick Randall differs significantly with Sands' original cut:

- The hurricane at the beginning (originally filmed for Land of Grief (Pandin Wippayoke), another Chaiyo production) is longer in Randall's version.
- The scene where the crocodile attacks a herd of water buffalo, which came immediately after the hurricane, occurs much later in the International version.
- A new opening credits scene (shot by Randall) was added where the crocodile is seen devouring a pair of naked women. Parts of the Chaiyo Productions logo are edited into the montage.
- Some outtakes from Krai Thong (another Chaiyo film featuring giant crocodiles) are inserted into the film. Included is a scene where three children are eaten by the crocodile.
- The crocodile's lengthy attack on a riverside village takes place in two separate scenes in Randall's version.
- The ending was altered: In the Thai version, Tony destroys the crocodile after throwing a dynamite fuse into its jaws. The international version has Peter's self-sacrifice causing the explosion.

When Randall's version was distributed in the US by Herman Cohen, further edits replaced the opening credits and end card. The American Humane Association rated this film unacceptable due to a scene in which a live crocodile is slashed to death with a knife.

== Box office performance ==
The film reached No. 11 in the US, per Variety magazine's weekly Top 50 Grossing Films chart, which predated the weekend box office reporting.
