= Sompote Sands =

Thai film director (1941-2021)

- สมโพธิ แสงเดือนฉาย
- Born: Sompote Saengduenchai; 24 May 1941; Phra Pradaeng, Samut Prakan, Thailand
- Died: 26 August 2021 (aged 80); Bangkok, Thailand
- Occupations: Filmmaker; special effects creator
- Years active: 1962–2021

Sompote Saengduenchai (Thai: สมโพธิ แสงเดือนฉาย; RTGS: Somphot Saengdueanchai; 24 May 1941 – 26 August 2021), internationally known as Sompote Sands, was a Thai film director, special effects creator and producer best known for directing several Thai films especially tokusatsu (special effects-based) genre or monster films such as The 6 Ultra Brothers vs. the Monster Army, Jumborg Ace & Giant, Hanuman and the Five Riders, the 1980 cult classic Crocodile, Phra Rod Meree and the 1985 fantasy monster film Magic Lizard. He was the founder and owner of Chaiyo Productions, based in Bang Pa-in, Phra Nakhon Si Ayutthaya.

== Early life ==
Sompote Sands was born in Phra Pradaeng, Samut Prakan Province to a Sino-Thai family. His father was a Chinese immigrant from Guangdong. Sands dreamed of becoming a filmmaker since childhood. When he was seven years old, he left home to live in a monastery in order to fulfil his dream. He then began his career in the film industry, starting as an employee in a photo studio. While he was studying at grade three, Sompote became a freelance photographer. His task was to take photos of King Bhumibol Adulyadej (Rama IX) in a boy scout uniform. One of these photos was published on the cover of Chaiyaphruek, a popular youth magazine at the time. He was also a private photographer for Jim Thompson. At the age of 15, Sands became the youngest photographer for Siam Rath, a newspaper with M.R. Kukrit Pramoj as the owner and editor-in-chief.

== Interning and filmmaking ==
In 1962, Sands received scholarships from the Government Savings Bank (GSB) and Mitsui Bank to study special effects production in Japan for two years. While in Japan, he worked with at least two famous Japanese directors, Akira Kurosawa and Eiji Tsuburaya, as a trainee. He offered Ejii a Buddha statue, and later returned to Thailand to become a full-time filmmaker. Eiji's son, Noboru Tsuburaya, came to him to ask for help because Tsuburaya Productions was in huge debt after the death of his father. The two worked together to produce Jumborg Ace & Giant in 1974, which was very successful, followed by a film featuring Eiji’s Ultraman characters: The 6 Ultra Brothers vs. the Monster Army, released in Thailand as Hanuman Meets 7 Supermen.

== Controversies ==
In 1996, Tsuburaya Productions was presented with a document claiming that Sands had ownership of the international rights to Ultraman, the Ultra Series before 1974, and Jumborg Ace. These were all the properties licensed to Chaiyo Productions by Tsuburaya to direct The 6 Ultra Brothers vs. the Monster Army and Jumborg Ace & Giant. It claimed they were turned over to him twenty years earlier in 1976 by Noboru, who died the year before. In Thailand during this period, news was spread that Ultraman belonged to the Thai people because the character was supposedly created by Sompote, who influenced Eiji with a photo he took of the large standing Buddha statue at the Sukhothai Historical Park. While Chaiyo Productions was defunct, a new, separate company titled Tsuburaya Chaiyo was formed around the same time as the document presentation for creating international material based on these licenses. They had also created original characters under the Ultraman name, starting a franchise called "Ultraman Millenium". Initially set to release films and a television series titled Project Ultraman, (Note: RS purchased the rights to broadcast the program, originally scheduled to air in April 2007 on Channel 7, with a sales contract signed in November 2006.) they were ordered by the Thai courts to cease and desist anything they were doing outside of the original licenses in April 2007. On November 20, 2017, a Los Angeles Federal Court ruled that Sands did not have ownership of the brand after a jury found that the 1976 document was not authentic. The final ruling on April 18, 2018 forbid Sands and Tsuburaya Chaiyo to use the franchise or its characters in any merchandise, events, or theatrical and televised media publicly, forcing him and the company to pay infringement damages.

== Later life and death ==
After directing his last film, Magic Lizard, in 1985, Sands only worked on producing Ultraman-related media without making any movies or series again. He lived in a private home that used to be a Chaiyo Productions film studio. It was also a museum that housed more than one million Ultra Series-related objects, called Ultraman Land.

Sands died of cancer on 26 August 2021, at the age of 80.

== Filmography ==
Films

- Chalawan (1972)
- Tah Tien (1973)
- Jumborg Ace & Giant (Yak Wat Jaeng pob Jumbo A) (1974)
- The 6 Ultra Brothers vs. the Monster Army (Hanuman pob Jed Yodmanud) (1974)
- Hanuman and the Five Riders (Hanuman pob Har Aimoddaeng) (1975)
- Computer Superman (1977)
- Land of Grief (Pandin Wippayoke) (1978)
- Ka Kee (1980)
- Crocodile (Chorakhe) (1980)
- Krai Thong (1980)
- Phra Rod Meree (1981)
- Crocodile Therakwad (1982)
- King Suea and Phanthai Norasingh (1982)
- The Noble War (Suek Kumphakan) (1984)
- Space Warriors 2000 (1985)
- Krai Thong 2 (1985)
- Magic Lizard (King-ka kay-a-sit) (1985)

Television films / Series

- Krai Thong (1970) Channel 7
- Phra Aphai Mani (1971) Channel 3
- Yai Ka Ta (1972)
- Long Prai (1973)
- Project Ultraman (suspended broadcast due to court judgment)
