= The Dragon (fairy tale) =

Fairy tale by Giambattista Basile

The Dragon (Neapolitan: Lo dragone) is an Italian literary fairy tale, included in Giambattista Basile's Pentamerone (Tale IV.5), first published 1635. In the English language, the tale was a selection in Thomas Keightley's Fairy Mythology (1828), and later appeared in John Edward Taylor (fl. 1840–1855)'s translation of the entire work, The Pentamerone, or, The Story of Stories, Fun for the Little Ones (1848). The tale has been classed as a version of Aarne–Thompson type 462 "the outcast queens and the ogress queen", rather than as "the dragon-slayer" (type 300). It exhibits folklore motif K873, "fatal deception by giving narcotic."

== Synopsis ==
A king of High-Shore (or High Marina, "Rè d'Auta Marina"), owing to his tyrannical and cruel conduct, has lost his throne during his absence, usurped by a sorceress (la maga). The king consults his oracular wooden statue and learns that he would regain his kingdom when the sorceress loses her sight. But agents sent to do his bidding are foiled by the well-guarded sorceress, who instantly detect any harm-seeking intruder and mete out "dog justice" upon them. The frustrated king compensates by ravishing any women he could lay his hands on and murdering them afterwards. Hundreds of victims later, the turn comes for the maiden Porziella (var. Portiella), her beauty described in poetic metaphor. The king raises his dagger (pugnale or "poniard"), intending to kill her like the rest, but just at that moment, a bird flies by and drops a root on his arm, causing him to tremble and drop the weapon. This bird was a fairy (fata), who had been saved from a satyr's lecherous mischief when Porziella had awoken her in time. (Note: "saved from rape by a satyr.")

The king decides to seal Porziella up in the garret or attic (soppigno). Here the tale actually gives description of the king's lurid mindset in reaching this decision: "it wasn't necessary to bathe the instrument of death with the same blood with which he had bathed the instrument of life" though this passage has been bowdlerized in Keightley and Taylor's translations. Porziella begins to starve, and the bird brings her a knife to drill into the corner of the floor, and breach a hole to the kitchen below for the bird to bring nourishment.

Porziella then gives birth to a son, raised in the sealed chamber, until as a grown boy he is surreptitiously lowered down by rope to the kitchen below. The boy (who was named Miuccio) is discovered by the cook, and soon employed as the king's page. Miuccio becomes more beloved by the king than his stepson, earning the enmity of the queen, who proceeds to hatch a series of schemes designed to bring about Miuccio's downfall.

The queen leads the king to believe that Miuccio has boasted he could build three castles hanging in air, and the king commands him to do so. Miuccio agonizes at first, but he accomplishes the task under bird's guidance, by building three huge cardboard castles, which are lifted into the air by three griffins summoned by the fairy-bird.

The queen wracks her brain for the next plot. At the queen's instigation, Miuccio is ordered to go blind the sorceress, which deed was prophesied to restore the king his kingdom. The king's speech includes his complaint that he has been reduced to being served by wretched four-breadloaf wage menials. (Note: Servuto da quatto pane a parte ("Servants who earn four loaves of bread each") evidently is a reference to settepanelle (seven little loaves of bread) customarily paid weekly to servants of this age. See footnotes Taylor 1848, p. 265n* and Canepa 2007, p. 329n5. Taylor remarks that paying mostly by wages in kind to supplement modest cash sums was common before the abundance of metals brought about by the discovery of America.) Miuccio moans so heavily that the bird sarcastically wonders out loud if even her death could cause him such grieving. The bird, assuring him of success, flies off into the woods to seek help. Chirping to gather a large flock of birds, she asks if any one of them would put out the sorceress's eyes, offering as reward safeguard against the talons of hawks and other raptor-kind and free pass (carta franca) "against muskets, bows, crossbows, and "bird-lime of the fowlers". (Note: Changed from Taylor's tr. whose "guns, crossbows, longbows..," runs out of sequence from the original: scoppette, archetta, valestre, e bestre. valestra or balestra answers to arbalest, a word for "crossbow.") A swallow (rennena) volunteers the task, as she nests in the palace and has been irritated by the sorceress's puffs of magic. The sorceress, realizing that being blinded by this darting bird signified her demise, shriekingly departs the city and enters a cave where she pounds her head against the wall until she dies.

With the sorceress eliminated, the king is able to reclaim his castle. Miuccio arrives simultaneously, and at the bird's prompting tells the king he wishes no other reward than to be left to his miserable lot, and not be bothered with any more tasks that placed him in harm's way. The king embraces him, and the queen fills with rage. She arranges a final perilous ordeal for Miuccio, which is to fight a fierce dragon dwelling in the vicinity. This dragon was born on the same hour as the queen, and in her own words was her brother. Their lives were inextricably tied, the death of one meant the death of the other, and then the queen could only be restored to life by smearing the blood of the dragon. Ordered by the king to dispatch this dragon, Miuccio throws a comical tantrum, saying this is no peeled pear ready for eating, but "a dragon, that tears with his claws, breaks to pieces with his head, crushes with his tail, craunches with his teeth, poisons with his eyes, and kills with his breath" (Taylor tr.). The hero has even developed the temerity to ask the king, exactly which "son of the Devil (figlio de lo Zefierno)" was it that got such ideas in his head. (Note: Translated as "son of hell" (Keightley); "son of perdition" (Taylor); "child of the Devil" (Penzer)) The king tolerates the insult, but stands firm in the demand.

The bird again comes to the rescue, bearing a certain soporific herb in its beak which when cast into the cave would put the dragon to sleep. (Note: Here the bird rhetorically mentions a certain game called scarreca l'aseno ("Unload the ass"), as noted by both Keightley and Taylor.) Miuccio takes a knife, (Note: cortella carrese, translated "good knife" (Keightley); "pruning knife" (Taylor) "large knife" (Penzer). The Neapolitan word carresse is glossed as carradore "cartwright" or carpentiere "carpenter".) and after tranquilizing the dragon with the herb, nicks and hacks at the beast. The queen feels a cutting pain in her heart, and with her life slipping away, tells the king that it was a sign that Miuccio must have slain the dragon, as astrologers predicted. The king blames the queen for her self-inflicted doom. The queen admits to underestimating Miuccio's abilities, but asks as a final favor to have her entire body anointed with the dragon's blood before she is buried.

Miuccio is ordered to retrieve the blood, but the bird stops him short, saying that that blood will revive the queen who has been manipulating the king to give Miuccio such ordeals, and the king should have long realized Miuccio was his kin, being so naturally drawn by affection for him. (Note: The bird says rhetorically that the dragon blood is to him "bull's blood," that is to say, deadly poison according to Pliny Canepa 2007, p. 334n14 gives Pliny Nat. Hist. 11.90, 28.41 citing Croce 393. Taylor gives Pliny, Hist. Nat. xi. 38; xxviii,10.) The king, who has tailed Miuccio out of curiosity, overhears the conversation, and learns not only Miuccio's identity as his true son, but the fact his mother Porziella has survived after fourteen years. The king in his contrition offers to forfeit his kingdom and his life to the fairy who safeguarded Miuccio and his mother all these years. But the fairy, now transforming into a beautiful maiden, only requires taking Miuccio as husband for services rendered. While the dead queen is tossed in the burial mound, the king takes Porziella as his new queen.

== Parallels ==
An Icelandic analogue to the folktale type (AT 462) is "The Witch in the Stone Boat" (tr. Andrew Lang), originally collected by Jón Árnason as Skessan á steinnökkvanum (1864). (Note: AT 462, list of analgues, Icelandic: Rittershaus 1902, No. 44 in Uther, The types of international folktales) In this Icelandic tale the hero is named Sigurður.

Parallel with the Sigurd/Sigurðr legend in the Völsunga saga had been noted by the Brothers Grimm (1856). Like the fairy tale, Sigurðr's royal birthright remains hidden, and he must earn his living by becoming a servant. He is given crucial advice by birds. The antagonist (Regin) wishes Sigurðr to slay the dragon (Fafnir) who is his own brother, as in the fairy tale where the wicked queen set the hero upon the dragon who is her own brother. The dragon's blood endows life-force or certain powers when administered, and not being able to obtain this commodity for himself has fatal consequences for the antagonist.

One recognized motif is the blinding by a bird, which befell the usurping sorceress in the story and the biblical Tobit. Tobit is also connected with central figure of "Story of Ahikar," and in that story, disseminated in Syriac, Arabic, and other languages, there occurs a demand to build a "Castle in the Air," just as in the story of the Pentamerone.

== Moral of the tale ==
As translator and commentator Nancy L. Canepa points out, the story carries the moral that "Those who try to harm others encounter their own downfall" in its preamble, yet while the plotting queen has met her doom in appropriate fashion, there is incongruity in the serial rapist-murderer king getting away scot-free without being discomfitted in the least.
