= List of mountains named The Sleeping Lady =

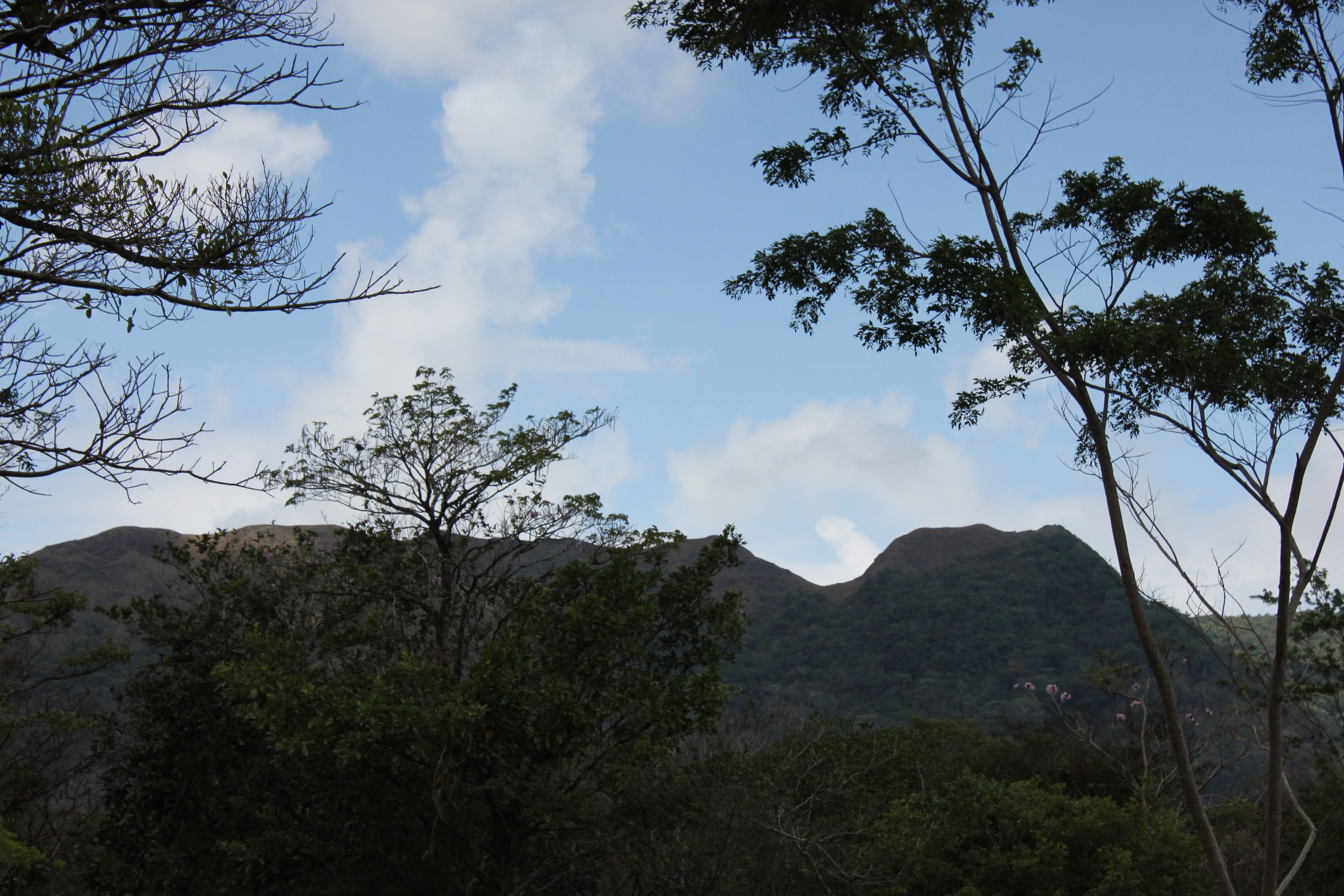
"La India Dormida" (The Sleeping Indian Woman) in El Valle de Anton, Panama.

The Sleeping woman is a name or nickname for certain mountain formations located in different places in the world that are said to look like a reclining or deceased woman in the local tradition.

== Ranges by the name of "The Sleeping Lady" ==
- Western United States (in all three cases, the nickname is associated with an apocryphal Native American legend of "The Sleeping Lady"):
  - Mount Susitna, near Anchorage, Alaska
  - Mount Timpanogos, near Provo, Utah
  - Mount Tamalpais, near San Francisco, California.
- Algeria: Mount Chenoua, according to local tradition the mountain range looks like a reclining pregnant woman.
- Cambodia: Phnom Kong Rei.
- Chile, in the Andes, Valle del Maipo Chile.
- China:
  - Sleeping Beauty Range (睡美人山) near Kunming.
  - Sleeping Beauty, Danxia near Shaoguan city.
- Greece, Leonidio, in Arcadia, Peloponnese
- Italy, Taburno Camposauro, La dormiente del Sannio (lit: Samnium's sleeping one), in Benevento province, Campania
- Martinique: Morne Larcher (Larcher Hill) called " la femme couchée" (the sleeping woman) is located in Diamant, Martinique.
- Mexico: Iztaccíhuatl
- Norway: Den Sovende Dronning (The Sleeping Queen), also known as Skjomtind, a mountain range near Narvik, Norway.
- Pakistan: Sleeping Beauty of Quetta. A Mountain called 'Sleeping Beauty' is also located in Quetta, Pakistan.
- Panama, La India Dormida (The Sleeping Indian Woman) in El Valle de Anton.
- Peru, La Bella Durmiente (The Sleeping Beauty) in Tingo María
- Philippines:
  - Sleeping Beauty, mountain in Kalinga province, northern Philippines.
  - Mount Makiling, mountain in Laguna, Philippines.
- Taiwan: Mount Guanyin, in New Taipei City Taiwan.
- Thailand:
  - Doi Nang Non in the Daen Lao Range, northern Thailand.
  - Khao Nang Non in Nakhon Si Thammarat province, southern Thailand.

=== Similarly named mountains ===
- La Noyée (drowned lady). A mountain range seen from Notre-Dame-des-Monts, Quebec. Local legend says the mountains are the silhouette of a Native American woman who drowned while swimming across Lac Nairne to meet her lover.
- La Mujer Muerta (the dead woman). A mountain range located in the Sistema Central, Spain. Highest point La Pinareja, 2197 m.
- Turó de la Dona Morta (Dead Woman hill), a mountain near Maçanet de la Selva, Catalonia, Spain
- Jebel Musa (Morocco) the mountain is also known as The Dead Woman (Spanish: la Mujer Muerta), because from the direction of Ceuta, around the town of Benzú, it resembles a woman on her back.
- The Virgin Gorda; Spanish for the fat virgin, as the island looks like an overweight woman lying on her side.

== Ranges by the name of The Sleeping or the Dead Lady ==
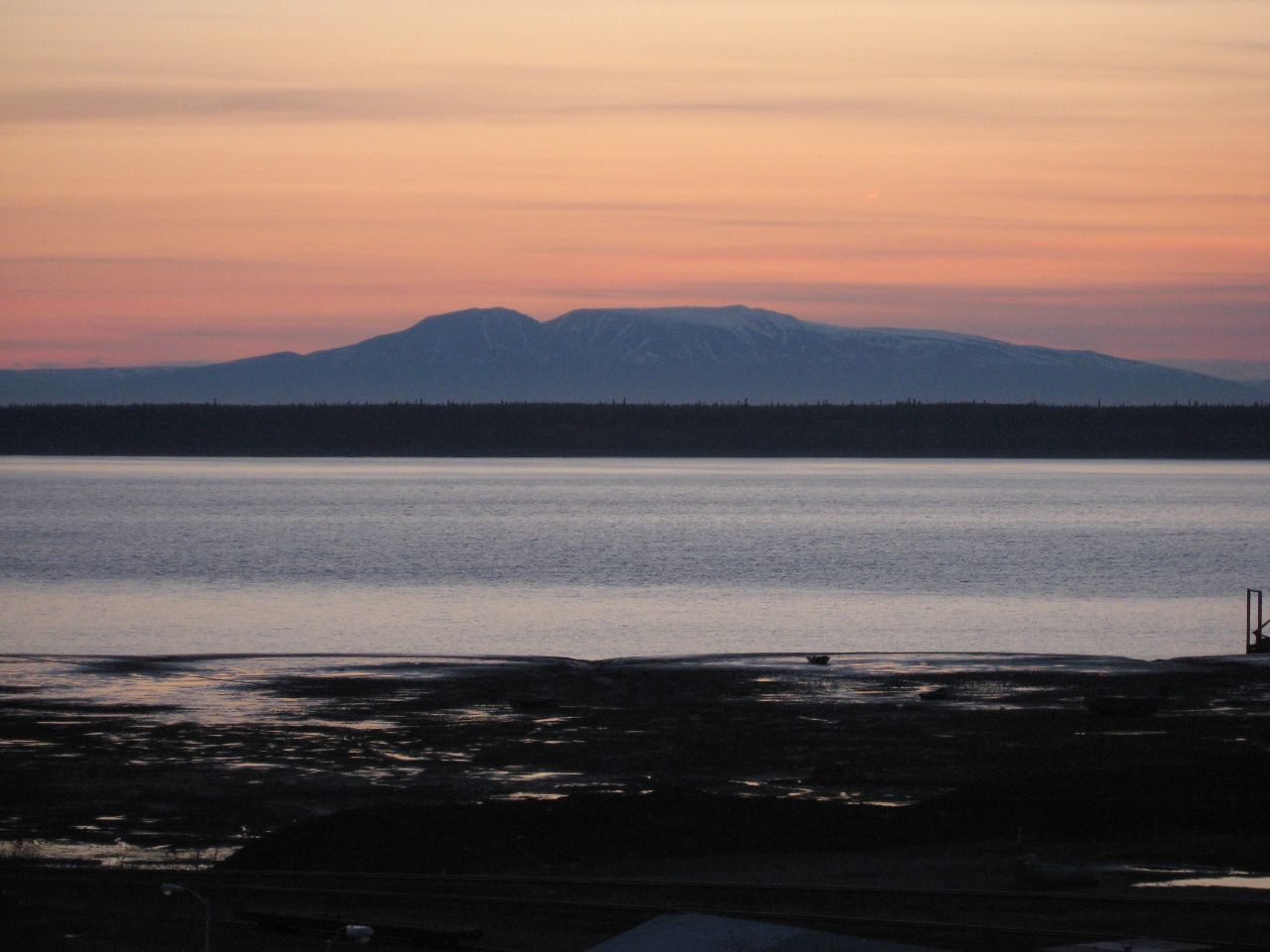
Sleeping Lady from Anchorage, Alaska at dusk

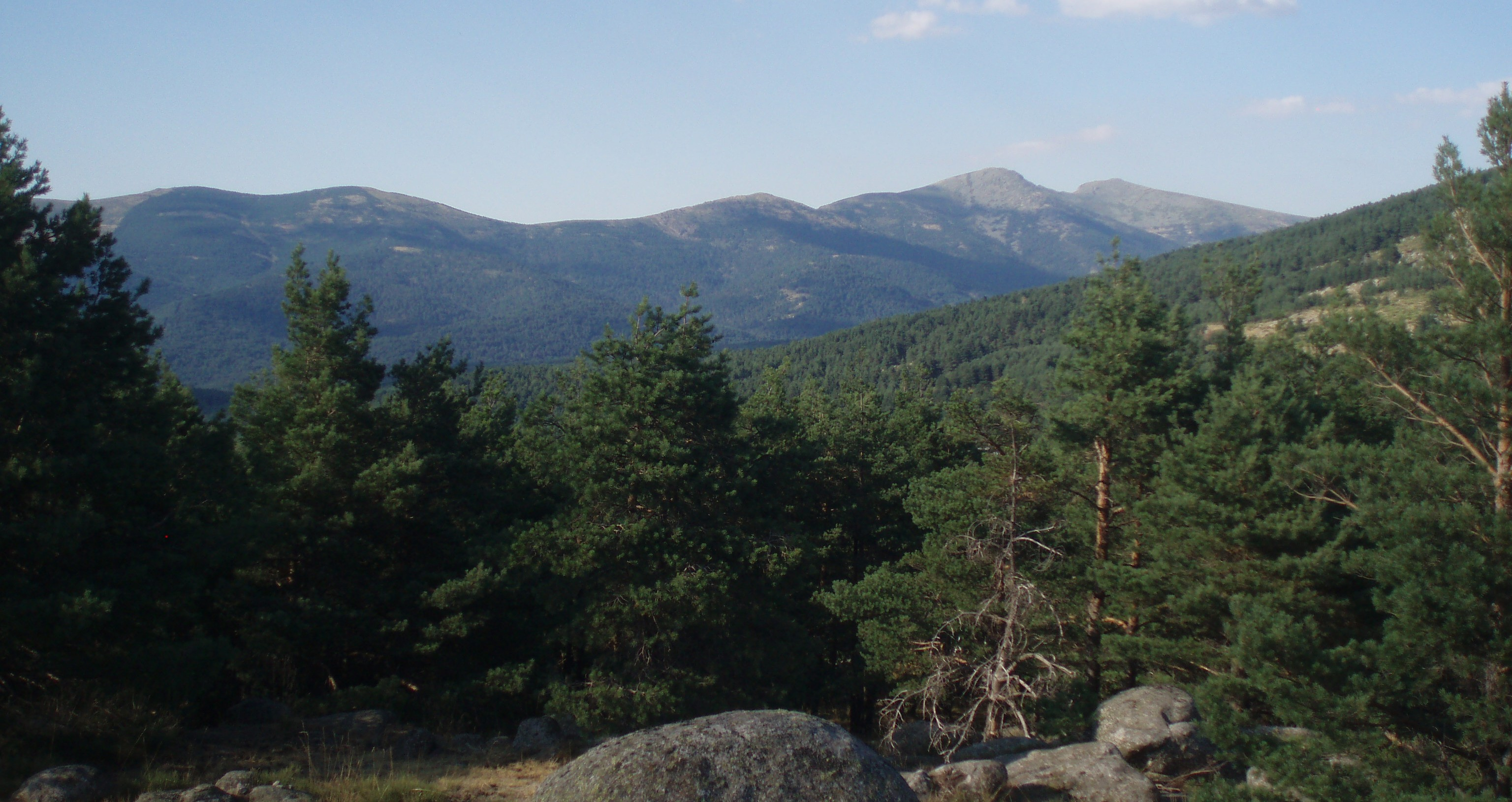
View of La Mujer Muerta, "the dead woman", Segovia, Spain.

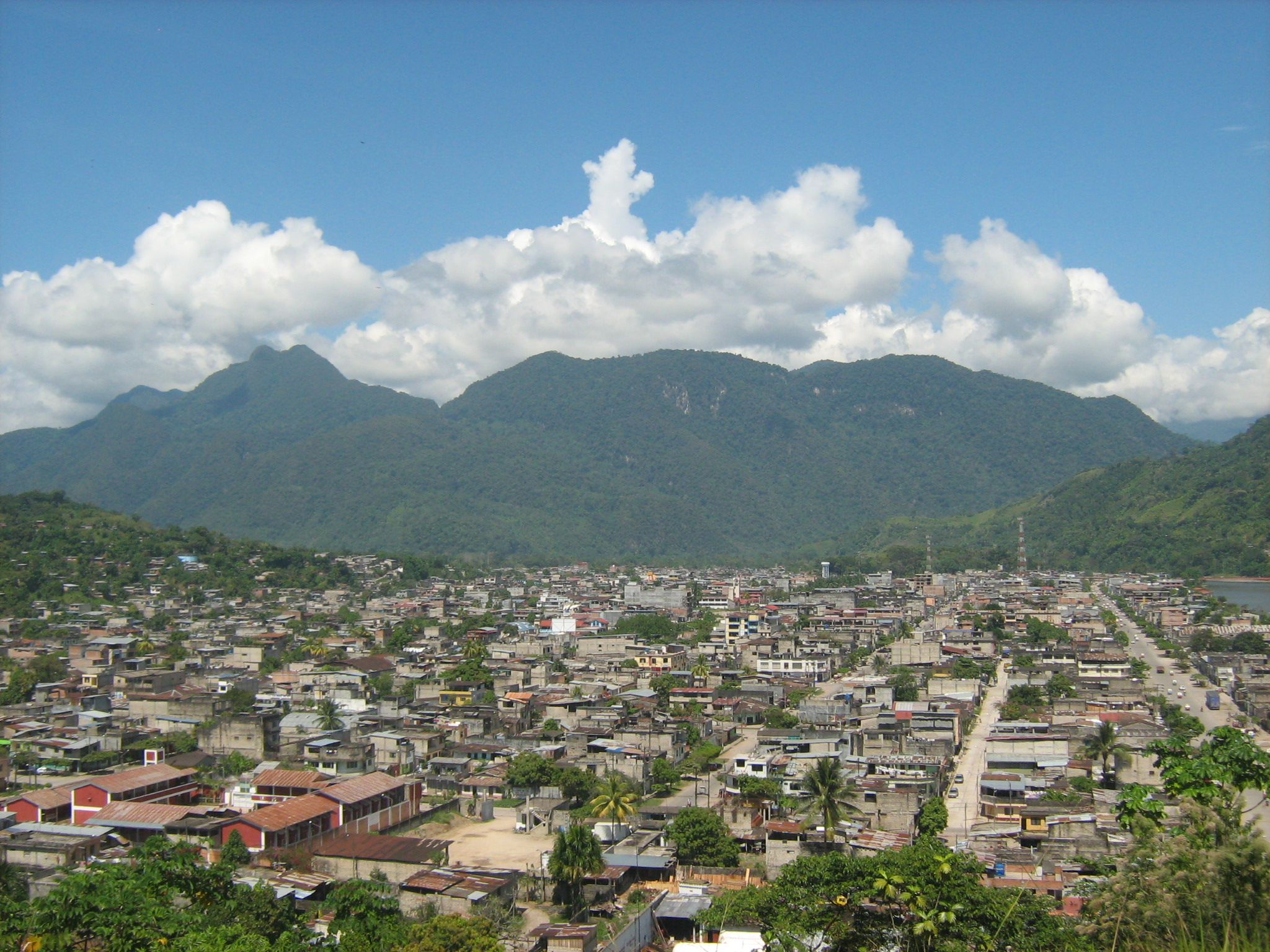
View of Pumarinri (La Bella Durmiente) in Peru.

== See also ==
- Breast-shaped hill
- Dead woman
- Northumberlandia
