= Deadman Hills =

Mountain range in California, U.S.

- Location within California

Highest point
- Elevation: 3,924 ft (1,196 m)

Geography
- Country: United States
- State: California
- Region: Mojave Desert
- District: San Bernardino County
- Range coordinates: 34°29′22.994″N 117°7′14.146″W
- Topo map: USGS Fifteenmile Valley

The Deadman Hills are a low mountain range in the Mojave Desert, in San Bernardino County, southern California.

The hills define the eastern side of Apple Valley, both the landform and community.

California State Route 18 passes south of the range and north of Deadman Point en route to the Lucerne Valley to the east.
