= Magic Lizard =

1985 Thai film

- Theatrical release poster
- Directed by: Sompote Sands
- Written by: Sompote Sands
- Produced by: Sompote Sands; Wannee Thanarungroj
- Starring: Lor Tok; Der Doksadao; Hiew Fah; Si Tao; Lak Apichart
- Music by: Aed Carabao
- Production companies: Chaiyo Productions Co., Ltd. Thanarungroj Film
- Distributed by: Chaiyo Productions Co., Ltd.
- Release date: 17 April 1985 (Thailand)
- Running time: 107 minutes
- Country: Thailand
- Language: Thai

Magic Lizard (Thai: กิ้งก่ากายสิทธิ์; RTGS: Kingka Kai Sit) is a 1985 Thai fantasy monster adventure film directed, written and produced by Sompote Sands. The film's plot follows a large frilled lizard who sets out to retrieve a crystal stolen by aliens.

== Summary ==
Magic Lizard is a large lizard who guards the crystal under the base of the pagoda of the Temple of Dawn. After Martians stole the crystal, Magic Lizard enlists the aid of the giant guardian as he escapes to various locations throughout Thailand, including Bridge on the River Kwai and Phae Mueang Phi. Over the course of the film, Magic Lizard flees from man-eating crocodile, wild elephants, tiger, a mother and baby black bear, run away from a train, giant mosquitoes and skeleton ghost in treasure cave.

== Production ==
The film originated from the nephew of Sompote, who, after graduating in Australia, brought back a frilled lizard. Finding it rather endearing, he was inspired to create a motion picture based on it.

== Release and reception ==
The film was released in Japan by NHK as エリマケトカゲ一人旅 (Erimaketokage hitoritabi; lit. 'Frilled Lizard Lonely Travel'). When it was released in Thailand, it was not expected to garner commercial success due to copyright infringements and the lack of a drafted copyright law. After not being successful in Thai theaters, it would go on to be Sompote's last film, with Chaiyo later going defunct in the late 1980s.

In February 2022, the film screened at the 11th Madrid International Cutre Film Festival, also known as CutreCon, in Spain. Discussing the film ahead of the festival, CutreCon director Carlos Palencia stated, "I cannot recommend this film enough, because it seems conceived by an extraterrestrial civilization. I didn't understand anything the first time I saw it. [...] it seems like a children's movie, but suddenly there is an alien invasion and there begins to be nudity, scenes of incomprehensible violence and other things I can't reveal because I don't want to ruin the movie. [...] I have not seen anything else like it, because nothing else like it exists."
