= Ka Kee =

- The Thai movie poster.
- Directed by: Neramit (Umnuai Klatnimi)
- Written by: Neramit
- Produced by: Sompote Sands
- Starring: Sorapong Chatree; Toon Hirunyasub; Ampha Poosith
- Cinematography: Anan Inla-or
- Music by: Sanit Siriwisut
- Distributed by: Chaiyo Productions
- Release date: 1980 (Thailand)
- Running time: 102 minutes
- Country: Thailand
- Language: Thai

Ka Kee (Thai: กากี) or Unfaithful is a 1980 Thai fantasy film based on the narrative poem Kaki Klon Suphap (Thai: กากีกลอนสุภาพ) written by Thai classical poet Chao Phraya Phrakhlong (Hon) (Thai: เจ้าพระยาพระคลัง (หน)) (c. 1740s - 1805), part of Thai folklore. The film was directed by Neramit and became one of the most famous Thai fantasy films of the year. A fotonovela based on scenes of the movie was also printed.

Other Thai movies with the same title but not based on the classical poem were released in 2003 and 2012.

== Plot ==
Garuda came down from his celestial residence to gamble with an ancient king in a dice game. Garuda saw the beautiful Ka Kee, the king's wife, and kidnapped her. The king's musician helped her to escape by also seducing her. The king took offence at Ka Kee's unfaithfulness, for she had slept with three men. He punished her by banishing her to a raft that floated to the middle of the ocean, sure that she would not survive her ordeal.

The raft drifted until it arrived at an island while Ka Kee was unconscious, tired and hungry. A group of thieves saw her and their chieftain wanted her for his wife, but Ka Kee awakened and escaped from them. Meanwhile. the soldiers of the island's king battled the thieves and set out to take Ka Kee home, but she refused because she acknowledged her sins and accepted her punishment. The new king was the former king's musician who had slept with Ka Kee. He declared his love openly to her. Ka Kee finally relented, went with the king, and they lived happily together ever after.

== See also ==
- Thai literature
- Cambodian literature (Ka key)
