= Jumborg Ace =

Japanese television series (1973)

- Genre: Superhero; Tokusatsu; Kaiju; Science fiction Kyodai Hero
- Created by: Tsuburaya Productions
- Developed by: Hiroyasu Yamaura
- Directed by: Yoshiyuki Kuroda
- Starring: Naoki Tachibana
- Composer: Shunsuke Kikuchi
- Country of origin: Japan
- No. of episodes: 50

Production
- Running time: 30 min. (per episode)

Original release
- Network: Mainichi Broadcasting System
- Release: January 17 – December 29, 1973

Jumborg Ace (ジャンボーグA, Janbōgu Ēsu) is a Japanese tokusatsu science fiction television series. Produced by Tsuburaya Productions, the show was broadcast on Mainichi Broadcasting System from January 17 to December 29, 1973, with a total of 50 episodes. This was also one of several shows Tsuburaya did to celebrate the company's 10th Anniversary (the other two being Ultraman Taro and Fireman).

== Plot summary ==
Young air delivery boy Naoki Tachibana (played by Naoki Tachibana) (Note: The character is distinguished from the actor in credits by spelling his given name with katakana (ナオキ), rather than the more common Kanji used for the actor (直樹).) is out to deliver a package for his grumpy boss Daisaku Banno (played by veteran actor Jun Tazaki), when his older brother Shin'ya (Toshiaki Amada), who commanded the defense force, Protective Attacking Team (PAT), was killed in an attack by a giant monster called King Jyglus (which was sent by the evil alien Antigone of the planet Groth). When PAT retaliates against a second attack by the monster, Naoki, in retaliation for his brother's death, suicidally tries to ram his air delivery cessna into the monster, to their shock. When the monster downs the plane, Naoki and his plane are teleported into an energy dimension by an Ultraman-like alien from the Emerald Star. The Emerald Alien has instantly used his technology to completely modify the plane, as well as Naoki's wristwatch. He suddenly finds himself back in his cessna's cockpit in the real world, but he hears the Emerald Alien's voice, telling him to activate his wristwatch, and upon shouting the command "Jum-Fight!!!", his jet transforms into the giant cyborg, Jumborg Ace, with Naoki, in a VR movement-control suit, piloting the robot from inside the head with his own physical movements! He fights with King Jyglas, eventually destroying the monster. But his battle against the Groth Aliens has only just begun...

== Powers and Abilities ==
Jumborg Ace has a vast array of powers, including a sword coming from his stomach, missiles, and energy beams. He can cut enemies heads off with a kick or change his body into a slicing machine. He can also transfer energy from his eyes if Jumborg 9 is out of power.

Later episodes find Naoki alternating from Jumborg Ace with a Honda Z, which transforms into a similar giant cyborg called Jumborg 9 (upon the command "Jum-Fight Two Dash!!!"). It has a pattern of red and silver and it has a light on its belt resembling Ultraman's Color Timer. And like the Color Timer, it blinks when Jumborg 9 is running out of power.

Unlike Ace, he can move very fast and can perform a dashing attack. But like him, he can shoot energy from his eyes to Ace. However unlike Ace, he cannot fly.

== Cameos ==
A Mirrorman bank owned by Kazuya can be seen in one episode. In addition, the characters of Chief Murakami, Yasuda and Nomura originally appeared in Mirrorman, thus placing the shows in the same universe.

Jumborg Ace was integrated into the "M78 Canon" in the form of "Jeanbot": A double-changing robot warrior who debuted in Ultraman Zero The Movie: Super Deciding Fight! The Belial Galactic Empire. He joined forces with updated versions of Fireman (Glen-Fire) and Mirrorman (Mirror-Knight), in addition to Ultraman Zero.

== Film ==
Jumborg Ace & Giant (ジャンボーグA&ジャイアント, Janbōgu Ēsu to Jaianto), known in Thailand as Giant and Jumbo A (ยักษ์วัดแจ้ง พบ จัมโบ้เอ - Yak Wat Jaeng phop Chambo E, or Yuk Wud Jaeng pob Jambo A, depending on the Romanization) is a tokusatsu science fiction/kaiju/superhero film produced in 1974 by Tsuburaya Productions of Japan and Chaiyo Productions of Thailand, directed by Sompote Sands. It was released theatrically in Thailand in April 1974. It has not been released theatrically in Japan.

This film teams the Japanese superhero Jumborg Ace with a giant stone idol called Yuk Wud Jaeng, simply known as "Giant" (this character was the star of a very successful film, Tah Tien, produced earlier by Chaiyo Productions) against Ace's own enemies.

Note that some of the scenes of this film contain footages of the Jumborg Ace TV series.

This film, along with The 6 Ultra Brothers vs. the Monster Army, marked the only time Tsuburaya Productions and Chaiyo Productions officially worked together. Decades after this film was made, relations between the two companies have deteriorated, leading to the legal battle over rights to the Ultraman characters (specifically the ones depicted in said film) and even Jumborg Ace, which was eventually won by Tsuburaya in 2008.

According to Sompote, the origin of this film dates back to the death of Eiji Tsuburaya, the founder and driving force behind Tsuburaya Productions. It was then revealed that the company was in debt of $500,000. Eiji's son, Noboru Tsuburaya, traveled to Thailand to seek his assistance. At first, Sompote offered to lend him cash, but Noboru declined. Eventually, they agreed to co-produce a film instead. The film became highly successful, enabling Tsuburaya to repay its debt. As a gesture of gratitude, the copyright to Ultraman was granted to Sompote.

== Cast ==
- Naoki Tachibana as Jumborg Ace / Naoki Tachibana
- Sipeuak as Yak Wud Jaeng
- Tape Tienchai as Yak Wat Pho
- Nobuo Tanaka as Demon Go-Ne (Male)
- Yoshino Ohtori as Demon Go-Ne (Female)
- Kazunari Mori as Jum Killer Jr
- Shuichiro Moriyama as Anti Go-Ne
- Michihiro Ikemizu as Mad Go-Ne
- Keiko Azuma as Demon Star (Human form)
- Kenichiro Kawamura as Antron (Human form)
- Anan Pricha as Anan
- Sripouk as Sipuak
- Srisuriya as Sisuliya
