= Turó de la Dona Morta =

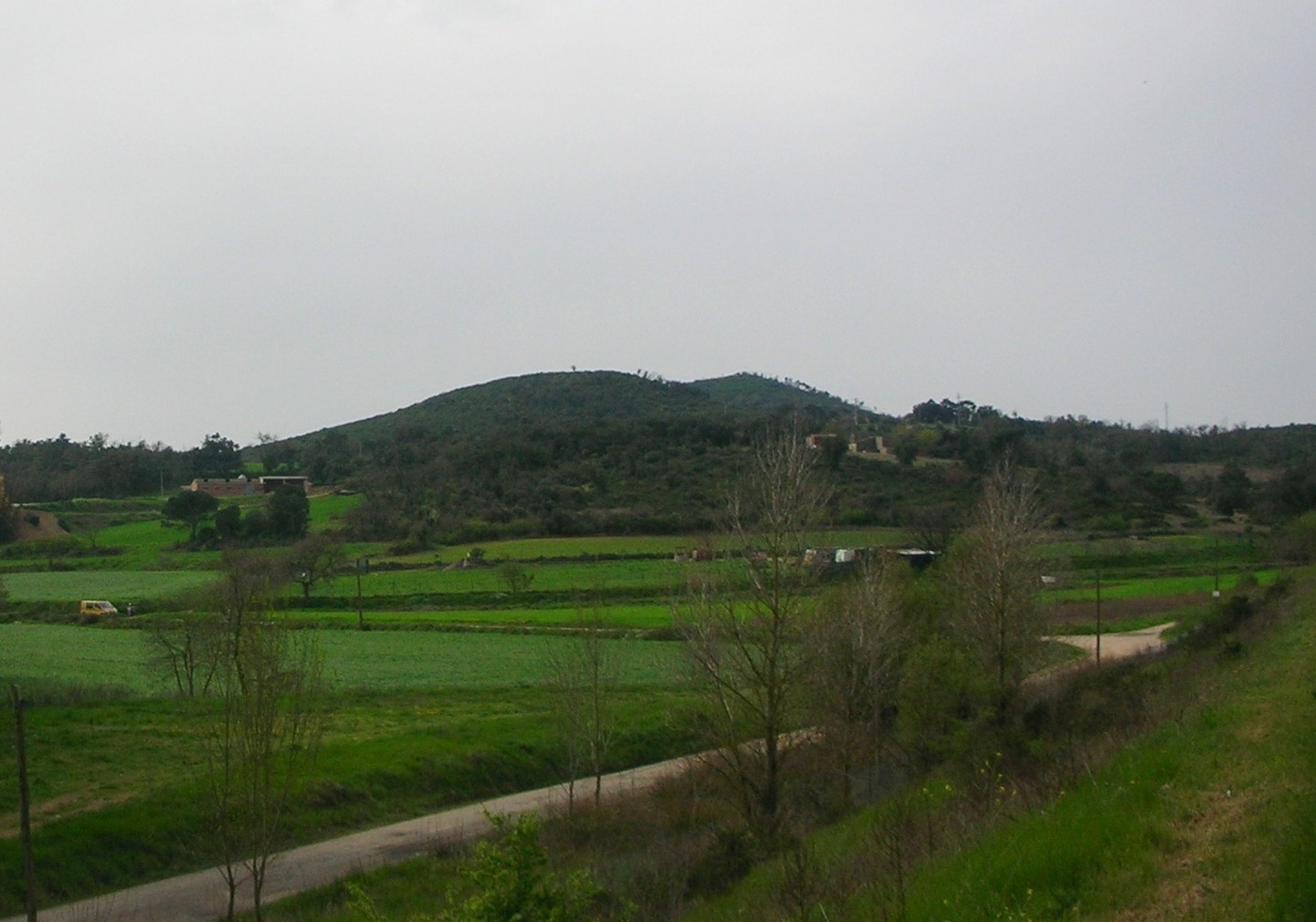
- View of the mountain from the northern side.

Highest point
- Elevation: 190.0 m (623.4 ft)
- Listing: List of mountains named The Sleeping Lady
- Coordinates: 41°44′51.23″N 2°43′33.22″E

Geography
- Location within Catalonia
- Location: Selva, Catalonia
- Parent range: Isolated hill in the Catalan Coastal Depression

Geology
- Mountain type: Conglomerate

Climbing
- First ascent: Unknown
- Easiest route: From Maçanet de la Selva or Vidreres

Turó de la Dona Morta (Dead Woman's Hill) is a mountain in the Selva comarca, Catalonia, Spain.

== Geography ==
It is located within the Maçanet de la Selva municipal limits, between the Autovia C-35 and Carretera Nacional N-II highways.

The Turó de la Dona Morta is a hill of the Catalan Coastal Depression. The hills looks like the silhouette of a dead woman seen roughly from the north or from the south, although there is also a legend saying that in ancient times a woman was murdered in the hill.

== See also ==
- Mountains of Catalonia
