= Maive Stokes =

19th-century author

- Born: Mary Susan Harriet Stokes; 20 November 1866; Shimla, British India
- Died: 3 December 1961 (age 95); London, U.K.
- Other name: Maive Boothby
- Occupations: Writer, folklorist
- Notable work: Indian Fairy Tales (1879)
- Father: Whitley Stokes
- Relatives: William Stokes (grandfather); Margaret Stokes (aunt)

Mary Susan Harriet Stokes Boothby (20 November 1866 – 3 December 1961), also known as Maive S. H. Stokes, was a writer, best known for Indian Fairy Tales (1879), published when she was still a teenager.

== Biography ==
Maive Stokes was born in Shimla, then under British India, the daughter of judge and scholar Whitley Stokes and Mary Bazely Stokes. Her grandfather was physician William Stokes and antiquarian Margaret Stokes was her aunt. She is known for collecting and editing fairy tales heard from her man-servant and ayahs (caretakers). The book titled, Indian Fairy Tales, was published privately in Calcutta in 1879, and in London by Ellis & White in 1880. Her mother contributed notes and her father made the book's index.

In 1910, Stokes and her sister Annie donated their late father's large Celtic literature collection to the University of London.

Stokes married Ernest Brooke Boothby in London in 1910. Her husband was killed in action in 1916, in World War I. She died in 1961 in London, at the age of 95.

== Publications ==
- Indian Fairy Tales (1879)
