= Demon Squad =

2019 American neo-noir horror film

- Directed by: Thomas Smith
- Written by: Erin Lilley; Thomas Smith
- Produced by: Kris Skoda
- Starring: Khristian Fulmer; Erin Lilley; Leah Christine Johnson; Scott Alan Warner
- Cinematography: Kris Skoda
- Edited by: Thomas Smith
- Music by: Soren Odom
- Production company: Fighting Owl Films
- Release date: October 22, 2019
- Running time: 107 minutes
- Country: United States
- Language: English

Demon Squad (also known as Night Hunters) is a 2019 American neo-noir horror film directed by Thomas Smith.

== Summary ==
Paranormal investigator Nick Moon from Alabama, hunting for an ancient artifact, is thrust into the hidden world of supernatural beings.

== Cast ==
- Khristian Fulmer as Nick Moon
- Erin Lilley as Daisy O'Reilly
- Leah Christine Johnson as Lilah Fontaine
- Scott Alan Warner as Dr. Paul Betencourt (as Scott Warner)

== Production ==
Like Smith's previous film, The Night Shift (2011), Demon Squad was shot and filmed in Mobile, Alabama; the character of Nick Moon originated from a script for a planned sequel to The Night Shift. Filming lasted for 13 days but was spread out over the course of several months, lasting from January to June 2015.

The film had a 2026 sequel Demon Squad: Tooth and Claw.

== Reception ==
A review in Film Threat concluded: "both Charlaine Harris and Raymond Chandler would be proud of this amalgamation of their source materials." Horror Geek Life wrote that the film "succeed(ed) in creating an alternate reality on a limited budget" and praised some of the performances, "particularly Khristian Fulmer’s Nick Moon and his very likable sidekick, Daisy O’Reilly".

=== Legacy ===
It was featured as the sixth riffed film of Mystery Science Theater 3000's thirteenth season, making it the most recent film (in terms of when it was released) to be featured on that show as of 2026. It is the first episode hosted by original host Joel Robinson (played by series creator Joel Hodgson) since his 1993 departure.

== See also ==
- Film noir
- The X-Files
