= Jonah Heston =

- Mystery Science Theater 3000 character
- Jonah Heston
- First appearance: 1101 – Reptilicus
- Created by: Joel Hodgson
- Portrayed by: Jonah Ray

In-universe information
- Species: Human
- Gender: Male

Jonah Heston is a fictional character featured in the renewal of the American science fiction comedy television series Mystery Science Theater 3000 (MST3K). He is portrayed by actor/comedian Jonah Ray.

== Overview ==
Jonah's first episode explains his backstory: formerly an ore transporter and inventor for Gizmonic Institute, Jonah was tricked into believing that a moon station was experiencing an emergency: he landed his transport spaceship on-site and was captured by Kinga Forrester and her assistant Max, the respective children of primary villains in the previous iteration of the show, Dr. Clayton Forrester and TV's Frank. Jonah was immediately transported onto the Satellite of Love in order to renew the Forrester experiment: subjected to watching terrible movies, which may drive him crazy. On the Satellite, he found the bots Tom Servo, Crow T. Robot, Gypsy, and Cambot, who assist him in keeping his sanity and getting through the movies.

Jonah has been the host from 2017 to 2018, for Seasons 11 and 12, has brought a return of the "Invention Exchange," where he and his tormentors would come up with whimsical inventions, a common feature when Joel Robinson was the test subject from the beginning of the series until he escaped with the help of the ’Bots.

In Mystery Science Theater 3000: The Comic, Jonah and the Bots are transported into bad comics thanks to Kinga's new invention, the Bubbulat-R. After Servo was transported into Johnny, Jason, Teen Reporter, Jonah, and Crow were transported into Black Cat, fighting alongside Linda Turner/Black Cat, whom Jonah has a romantic interest in. But then, Jonah starts to lose his movie-riffing self-confidence when Crow goes into Horrific after a motorcycle crash and becomes a monster based on the Crypt-Keeper, the "Crow Keeper" thanks to four-color fever. Realizing how much he needs the Bots, Jonah and the other Bots desperately try to riff themselves out of separate comics so they can save Crow and stop Kinga Forrester's plan of conquering comic media. Part of this plan is ad sponsorship by Totino's Pizza Rolls. This campaign interferes with the events, characters, and continuity of the comic books.

Jonah Heston Mystery Science Theater 3000
Media offices
Preceded by Mike Nelson	Host/Test Subject	Succeeded by Incumbent
