= Tim Blaney =

American puppeteer and voice actor

- Born: Timothy Patrick Blaney; April 25, 1959 (age 67); Los Angeles, U.S.
- Occupations: Puppeteer, Voice actor
- Years active: 1985–present

Timothy Patrick Blaney (born April 25, 1959) is an American puppeteer and voice actor. He has provided the voices for Frank the Pug in the Men in Black franchise, and the robot Johnny 5 in Short Circuit and Short Circuit 2.

== Filmography ==
=== Films ===
Year	Title	Role	Notes
1985	The Hugga Bunch	Additional puppeteer	Television film
1986	Short Circuit	Number 5/"Johnny Five" (voice)	
1986	Flight of the Navigator	Puppeteer, Puckmaren (voice)	
1988	Short Circuit 2	Johnny 5 (voice)	
1989	The Abyss	Puppeteer	
1994	Muppet Classic Theater	Additional Muppet Performer	
1997	Men in Black	Frank the Pug (voice)	
1998	Blues Brothers 2000	Puppeteer	
2000	How the Grinch Stole Christmas	Puppeteer	
2002	Men in Black II	Frank the Pug (voice)	
2004	The SpongeBob SquarePants Movie	Goofy Goober (voice)	
2004	Team America: World Police	Puppeteer	
2008	Forgetting Sarah Marshall	Puppeteer	
2008	Studio DC: Almost Live	Puppeteer	
2009	Where the Wild Things Are	Puppeteer	
2011	The Muppets	Additional Muppet Performer	
2012	Casa de mi padre	Puppeteer	
2012	Men in Black 3	Worm Guy #4 (voice)	
2013	Lady Gaga and the Muppets Holiday Spectacular	Additional Muppet Performer	
2014	Muppets Most Wanted	LA Muppet Performer	
2017	Soylent Scrooge: Or, Christmas Is Made of People	Mr. Fezziwig (voice)	
2018	It's A Tell-Tale Valentine, Eddie Poe!	Edgar Allan Poe, Snooby, Woodraven (voice)	
2018	The Happytime Murders	Additional puppet performer	
2018	The Tragicall Historie of Plan the IX	The Ruler (voice)	
2018	Do Rabbots Dream of Electric Cheepz?	Mr. Marigold (voice)	
2018	It's the Great Spaghetti Squash, Eddie Poe!	Snooby, Woodraven (voice)	
2019	Albert Kitschschlock Presents: The Films That Blew Too Much	Narrator (voice)	
2019	Men in Black: International	Frank the Pug (voice)	
2019	The Legend of Joan of Arc	Ladvenu (voice)	
2020	It's the Masque of the Polychrome Death, Eddie Poe!	Snooby (voice)	
2020	The Young Witchfinder	Mauldrix, Goobley	Television film
2021	It's A Mystery Trip to the Rue Morgue, Eddie Poe!	Edgar Allan Poe, Snooby, Woodraven (voice)	

=== Short film ===
Year	Title	Role	Notes
1999	The Wacky Adventures of Ronald McDonald: The Legend of Grimace Island	Long John Silver, Captain Smollett (voice)	Direct-to-video
2002	MIB ADR	Self	
2002	Creature Featurettes	Self	
2009	The Macabre World of Lavender Williams	Puppeteer	
2014	Pillywags Mansion	Greg	
2020	Life After the Navigator	Self	

=== TV series ===
Year	Title	Role	Notes
1980	Barbara Mandrell and the Mandrell Sisters	Puppeteer	Episode #1.3
1984-1994	McDonaldland	Puppeteer	
1994	Dinosaurs	Additional Dinosaur Performer	"Earl's Big Jackpot" (1994)
1996–1997	Muppets Tonight	Additional Muppets (voice)	"Cindy Crawford" (1996); Season 2 (1996-1997) episodes 1, 5, 6, 7
2004	Angel	Puppeteer, Grufus	Episode: "Smile Time"
2006	Still Standing	Jess Milton	Episode: "Still Eighteen"
2013	Community	Puppeteer	Episode: "Intro to Felt Surrogacy"
2013–2017	Uncle Grandpa	Emperor Krell, additional voices	2 episodes
2017–2018	Mystery Science Theater 3000	GPC (puppeteer)	

=== Events ===
Year	Title	Role	Notes
2017	The Muppets Take the Bowl	Additional Muppet Performer	Live show at the Hollywood Bowl, Sept. 8–10
2018	The Muppets Take the O2	Additional Muppet Performer	Live show at the O2 Arena, Jul. 13-14

=== Video games ===
Year	Title	Role	Notes
2011	The Elder Scrolls V: Skyrim	Male Argonians, Usha	
2012	Asura's Wrath	Kagebosh	English dub
2012	MIB: Alien Crisis	Frank the Pug, Archeologist, C-YA Programmer Riddick	
2012	Guild Wars 2	Vlast	
2013	Marvel Heroes	Ben Urich	
2017	Guild Wars 2: Path of Fire	Vlast	
2019	Marvel Ultimate Alliance 3: The Black Order	Kingpin	
2022	Men in Black: First Assignment — VR Experience	Frank the Pug	English dub
2025	The Elder Scrolls IV: Oblivion Remastered	Male Argonians	
