= Mystery Science Theater 3000 =

American science fiction comedy television series

- Also known as: MST3K; MST 3000
- Genre: Science fiction comedy; Adult puppeteering; Film review
- Created by: Joel Hodgson
- Showrunner: Joel Hodgson (1988–1993)
- Written by: Various writers: Trace Beaulieu (1988–1996; 2026); Joel Hodgson (1988–1993, 2017–2018); Kevin Murphy (1988–1999, 2026–present); Jim Mallon (1988–1991); Josh Weinstein (1988–1990); Michael J. Nelson (Headwriter: 1990–1999, 2026–present); Frank Conniff (1990–1995; 2026); Paul Chaplin (1991–1999, 2017–2018); Mary Jo Pehl (1992–1999, 2017–2018); Bridget Jones (1992–1999); Bill Corbett (1995–1999, 2026–present); Elliott Kalan (2017–2018); Conor Lastowka (2026–present); Sean Thomason (2026–present); Jason Miller (2026–present); Zachary Shatzer (2026–present)
- Directed by: Various directors: Trace Beaulieu (1992–1996); Robert Cohen (2017); Bill Corbett (2026–present); Joel Hodgson (1992–1993); Jim Mallon (1988–1997); Matt McGinnis (2022); Kevin Murphy (1992–1999, 2026–present); Michael J. Nelson (1992–1999, 2026–present); Jonah Ray (2022); Tim Ryder (2022); Rob Schrab (2018); Todd Ziegler (1989)
- Starring: Various actors and actresses: Joel Hodgson (1988–1993); Trace Beaulieu (1988–1996, 2026); Josh Weinstein (1988–1990); Jim Mallon (1989–1997); Kevin Murphy (1990–1999, 2026–present); Frank Conniff (1990–1995, 2026); Michael J. Nelson (1990–1993; recurring; 1993–1999, 2026–present); Mary Jo Pehl (1992–1996; recurring; 1997–1999, 2026–present); Bill Corbett (1997–1999, 2026–present); Patrick Brantseg (1997–1999); Jonah Ray (2017–2022); Patton Oswalt (2017–2022); Felicia Day (2017–2022); Hampton Yount (2017–2022); Baron Vaughn (2017–2022); Rebecca Hanson (2017–2022); Emily Marsh (2022)
- Voices of: Various voice actors and voice actresses: Crow T. Robot – Trace Beaulieu, Bill Corbett, Hampton Yount, Kelsey Ann Brady; Tom Servo – Josh Weinstein, Kevin Murphy, Baron Vaughn, Conor McGiffin; Gypsy/GPC – Josh Weinstein, Jim Mallon, Patrick Brantseg, Rebecca Hanson
- Theme music composer: Charlie Erickson ("Chuck Love") (music); Joel Hodgson (music and lyrics); Josh Weinstein (original lyrics); Best Brains (lyrics)
- Opening theme: "Love Theme from Mystery Science Theater 3000"
- Ending theme: "Love Theme from Mystery Science Theater 3000" (1988–1989); "Mighty Science Theater"
- Country of origin: United States
- Original language: English
- No. of seasons: 14
- No. of episodes: 234 (list of episodes)

Production
- Executive producer: List: Jim Mallon (Note: Jim Mallon, president of Best Brains, was executive producer during the entirety of its original run from 1988–1999, and producer from 1988-1997.); Joel Hodgson (Note: Joel Hodgson was executive producer of the series from 1988-1993 during his time as host at Best Brains, and later from 2017-2022 under his company, Alternaversal.); Elliott Kalan (Note: Elliott Kalan executive produced the series from 2017-2018, before becoming a consultant in 2022.); Harold Buchholz (Note: Harold Buchholz, Tom Gates, Dan Lanigan, John T. Lyons, Amelia Kane Shannon, Greg Tally, Meredith Tally, David McIntosh and Aaron Meyerson were executive producers for the show during its run on Netflix from 2017-2018.); Bob Emmer (Note: Bob Emmer, Garson Foos and Richard Foos were executive producers for the series during its run on Netflix and The Gizmoplex from 2017-2022.); Garson Foos; Richard Foos; Jonathan Stern (Note: Jonathan Stern executive produced the show from 2017-2018 at his company, Abominable Pictures.); Tom Gates; Dan Lanigan; John T. Lyons; Amelia Kane Shannon; Greg Tally; Meredith Tally; Larry Tanz (Note: Larry Tanz, vice president at Netflix, was executive producer for the series from 2017-2018.); Mike Aronow (Note: Mike Aronow executive produced the show in 2018.); David McIntosh; Aaron Meyerson; John Krasno (Note: John Krasno, Michael Oeth, Sharyl Volpe and Larry Hastings executive produced the show during its run on The Gizmoplex in 2022.); Michael Oeth; Sharyl Volpe; Larry Hastings; David G. Martin (Note: David G. Martin, CEO of RiffTrax, is executive producer of "The RiffTrax Experiments" as of 2026.)
- Producers: Kevin Murphy (Note: Kevin Murphy produced the series during its Sci-Fi Channel run, succeeding Jim Mallon, from 1997 to 1999, and again in 2026 at RiffTrax.); Ivan Askwith (Note: Ivan Askwith was producer during the show's run on Netflix and The Gizmoplex from 2017 to 2022.); David Soldinger (Note: David Soldinger was producer during the show's run on Netflix from 2017 to 2018.); Clinton Trucks (Note: Clinton Trucks was producer during the show's run on The Gizmoplex in 2022.); Michael J. Nelson (Note: Michael J. Nelson and Bill Corbett are producers of the series at RiffTrax as of 2026.); Bill Corbett
- Production locations: Hopkins, Minnesota (1988–1989); Eden Prairie, Minnesota (1989–1999); Los Angeles, California (2017–2018); Minneapolis, Minnesota (2026–present)
- Cinematography: Jeff Stonehouse (1995–1999, 2026–present)
- Running time: 92–109 minutes
- Production company: Various companies: Best Brains, Inc. (a.k.a. Hair Brain Productions) (1989–1999); Alternaversal Productions, LLC (Note: Credited as Alternaversal, LLC for the first three seasons, only credited via the logo on seasons 13.) (2017–2022); Satellite of Love, LLC (2017–2018); Titmouse, Inc. (Note: Credited as Titmouse, Inc. with no period with season 13, and the first removed “, inc.” with season 14.) (2017-present); HBO Downtown Productions (1992–1996); Comedy Central (1989–1996); RiffTrax (2026–present); Shout! Studios (2026–present)

Original release
- Network: KTMA-TV
- Release: November 24, 1988 – May 28, 1989
- Network: The Comedy Channel
- Release: November 18, 1989 – February 2, 1991
- Network: Comedy Central
- Release: June 1, 1991 – May 18, 1996
- Network: Sci-Fi Channel
- Release: February 1, 1997 – September 12, 1999
- Network: Netflix
- Release: April 14, 2017 – November 22, 2018
- Network: Gizmoplex
- Release: March 4 – December 16, 2022
- Network: RiffTrax
- Release: September 9, 2026 – present

Related
- The Film Crew; RiffTrax; Cinematic Titanic

Mystery Science Theater 3000 (abbreviated as MST3K) is an American science fiction comedy television series created by Joel Hodgson. The show premiered on KTMA-TV (now WUCW) in Saint Paul, Minnesota, on November 24, 1988. It then moved to nationwide broadcast, first on The Comedy Channel for two seasons, then Comedy Central for five seasons until its cancellation in 1996. Thereafter, it was picked up by The Sci-Fi Channel and aired for three more seasons until another cancellation in August 1999. A 60-episode syndication package titled The Mystery Science Theater Hour was produced in 1993 and broadcast on Comedy Central and syndicated to TV stations in 1995.

In 2015, Hodgson led a crowdfunded revival of the series with 14 episodes in its eleventh season, first released on Netflix on April 14, 2017, with another six-episode season following on November 22, 2018. A second successful crowdfunding effort in 2021 produced 13 additional episodes shown on the Gizmoplex, an online platform that Hodgson developed which launched in March 2022. In late 2026, four new Mystery Science Theater 3000 episodes, dubbed The RiffTrax Experiments, hosted by Michael J. Nelson, and starring the show's Sci-Fi Channel-era cast, were released. As of 2026, 234 episodes and a feature film have been produced, as well as four live tours.

The show initially starred Hodgson as Joel Robinson, a janitor trapped by two mad scientists ("The Mads") on the Earth-orbiting Satellite of Love and forced to watch a series of B movies to monitor his reaction to them. To keep his sanity, Joel crafts sentient robot companions, including Tom Servo, Crow T. Robot, Cambot and Gypsy, to keep him company and help him humorously comment on each movie as it plays, a process known as riffing. Each two-hour episode would feature a single movie (often edited for time constraints), sometimes preceded by various old shorts and educational films, with Joel, Tom, and Crow watching in silhouette from a row of theater seats at the bottom of the screen. These "theater segments" were framed with interstitial sketches called "host segments". The show's cast changed over its duration; most notably, the character of Joel was replaced by Mike Nelson (played by Michael J. Nelson) halfway through the show's fifth season. Other cast members, most of whom were also writers for the show, include Trace Beaulieu, Josh Weinstein, Jim Mallon, Kevin Murphy, Frank Conniff, Mary Jo Pehl, Bill Corbett, Paul Chaplin, and Bridget Jones Nelson. The 2017 revival features a primarily new cast, including Jonah Ray who plays the new human test subject Jonah Heston, along with Felicia Day and Patton Oswalt as "The Mads" and Baron Vaughn, Hampton Yount, and Rebecca Hanson voicing Tom Servo, Crow T. Robot, and Gypsy, respectively. Season 13 brought back this cast while integrating Emily Connor, played by Emily Marsh, and others from the live tours in this era.

Initially MST3K did not garner high viewership numbers, but the show's popularity spread through online word-of-mouth by its fans known as "MSTies" or "Mysties" (who would remind others to "Keep circulating the tapes"), frequent repeats, syndication, and home media offerings produced by Rhino Entertainment. Currently, this popularity continues through Shout! Studios, who along with Hodgson (until 2026), now own the rights to the show and supported the revived series. MST3K was listed as one of Time magazine's "100 Best TV Shows of All-TIME" in 2007, and TV Guide has noted MST3K as one of the top cult television shows. The show won a Peabody Award in 1993, was also nominated for two Emmy Awards in 1994 and 1995, and for the CableACE Award from 1992 to 1997. The show was considered highly influential, contributing towards the practice of social television, and former cast members launched projects similarly on riffing on films, including The Film Crew, RiffTrax, and Cinematic Titanic. MST3K also brought to light several older movies that had fallen into obscurity or had received little or no public attention when originally released. Many of these films were subsequently identified as among the worst movies ever made, most notably Manos: The Hands of Fate.

== Premise ==
While the cast of MST3K changed throughout its history, the basic premise of the show remains consistent: a human test subject—first Joel Robinson (Joel Hodgson), then Mike Nelson (Michael J. Nelson), and later Jonah Heston (Jonah Ray) and Emily Connor (Emily Marsh)—has been imprisoned aboard the spacecraft Satellite of Love by mad scientists (collectively called "The Mads") and is forced to watch a series of bad movies in order to find one that will drive the test subject insane.

In an attempt to keep his sanity, Joel built sentient robots ("the bots") from parts aboard the Satellite of Love, and they subsequently remained aboard with Joel's successors as test subjects. The Bots include Tom Servo, Crow T. Robot, GPC (formerly Gypsy) who is in charge of satellite operations, and Cambot, the silent recorder of the experiments. Crow and Servo join the human test subject in watching the film in the satellite's theater. To keep from going mad, the trio frequently comment and wisecrack during the movie, a process known as "riffing". At regular intervals throughout the movie, the hosts leave the theater and return to the bridge of the satellite to perform sketches (commonly called "host segments") that often satirize the film being watched.

== Format ==
The general format of an MST3K episode has remained the same throughout the series' run. Episodes are approximately 90 minutes in running time (excluding commercial breaks) and begin with a short introductory segment in which the human host and the 'bots interact with the Mads before being sent the movie. During Joel Hodgson and Jonah Ray's tenures as hosts (and for a brief period at the start of the Mike Nelson era), the hosts and the Mads engage in an "invention exchange" in which they each show off their latest inventions. A buzzer and flashing lights ("Movie Sign") then signal the characters to enter the theater.

An example of MST3K's "Shadowrama" effect used as the central motif for the show. Here, Tom Servo (left), Joel Robinson, and Crow T. Robot, in silhouette, are watching the short Mr. B Natural in the 1991 episode featuring War of the Colossal Beast

In the theater, the human host and robots Tom and Crow sit in a row of theater seats, shown in silhouette along the bottom of the screen, an approach Hodgson called "Shadowrama". The three then riff on the film (which is sometimes accompanied by one or more shorts) as it plays for both them and the audience. Occasionally, the silhouette format is used as a source of humor, or as a means of creating unobtrusive censor bars for scenes containing nudity. The show transitions into and out of the theater via a "door sequence", a series of six doors that open or close as the camera (presumably Cambot) passes through them.

At regular intervals throughout the episode, the characters leave the theater and perform sketches, usually inspired by the events of the film or short being shown, frequently making use of original songs and prop comedy. Some sketches bring in new or recurring characters or other devices; the host would consult an external camera, "Rocket Number Nine", to show events happening outside the Satellite, and the "Hexfield Viewscreen" would be used to communicate with other characters from the ship's bridge. At the end of each sketch, "Movie Sign" (a reference to the concept of wormsign from Frank Herbert's classic sci-fi novel Dune) is triggered again, and the characters must re-enter the theater.

During Hodgson's period on the show, the final sketch aboard the Satellite often included reading of fan mail from the "MST3K Info Club". Fan mail readings decreased during Mike Nelson's tenure as host and were dropped entirely once the show moved onto the Sci-Fi Channel. The final sketch of an episode typically ends with the Mads, with the lead Mad asking their lackey to "push the button" to end the transmission and transitioning to the credit sequence. After the credits, a humorous short clip from the featured film (or the accompanying short on occasion) is replayed as a "stinger" to end the episode (starting in Season 2 with a scene of the blind man from Rocket Attack U.S.A..) For the show's 2026 reboot, a new MST3K Info Club was created for fan mail, which Mike Nelson and the bots read during the closing credits.

In November 1993, a limited selection of episodes were repackaged into an hour-long show titled Mystery Science Theater Hour, meant to be better suited for off-network syndication. In these, the original episode was split into two parts, each about 45 minutes long, excluding commercials. New skits opening and ending each episode included Mike Nelson portraying television host Jack Perkins.

== Production history ==
=== Concept ===
Hodgson is credited for devising the show's concept. Prior to the show, Hodgson was an up-and-coming comedian from Minneapolis having moved to Los Angeles and made appearances on Late Night with David Letterman and Saturday Night Live. He had been invited by Brandon Tartikoff to be on an NBC sitcom co-starring Michael J. Fox, but Hodgson felt the material was not funny and declined (the proposed sitcom went unrealized). He further became dissatisfied with the Hollywood attitudes when they tried to double their offer, acquiring what he called a "healthy disrespect" for the industry. He moved back to Minneapolis-St. Paul, taking a job in a T-shirt printing factory that allowed him to conceive of new comedy ideas while he was bored. One such idea provided the basis of MST3K, a show featuring humorous commentary on movies that would allow him to showcase his own prop comedy-style humor. Hodgson referred to these jokes as "riffs", based on both the idea of musical riffs and the idea of comedy riffs, a term he attributes to The Simpsons' writer Dana Gould. In terms of movie selection, Hodgson had recalled that his college roommate had a copy of The Golden Turkey Awards, and he had previously wondered why no one had made any program about these "adorable, weird movies" listed within it.

The illustration for the song "I've Seen That Movie Too" in the liner notes of Elton John's Goodbye Yellow Brick Road, from which Hodgson took inspiration for MST3K's theme and approach

Hodgson said that part of the idea for MST3K came from the illustration for the song "I've Seen That Movie Too" (drawn by Mike Ross) in the liner notes from Elton John's Goodbye Yellow Brick Road album, showing silhouettes of a couple sitting in a theater watching Gone with the Wind. Hodgson also likened the show's setting to the idea of a pirate radio station broadcasting from space. Hodgson credits Silent Running, a 1972 science-fiction film directed by Douglas Trumbull, as being perhaps the biggest direct influence on the show's concept. The film is set in the future and centers on a human, Freeman Lowell (Bruce Dern), who is the last crew member of a spaceship containing Earth's last surviving forests. His remaining companions consist only of three robot drones. MST3K and the Joel Robinson character occasionally reflected Lowell's hippie-like nature. Hodgson wanted the feel of the show to appear homemade, and cited the example of a crude mountain prop used during the Saturday Night Live sketch "Night on Freak Mountain" that received a humorous reaction from the studio audience as the type of aesthetic he wanted for the show. Hodgson had made dozens of such robots from random parts before as art that he sold to friends and others, and knew he could incorporate that into the show.

Both old movies and music inspired several of the show's character names as developed by Hodgson. The show's name came from the promotional phrase "Mystery Scientist" used by magician Harlan Tarbell and a play on the name of Sun Ra's band, the Myth Science Arkestra. The "3000" was added to spoof the common practice of adding "2000" to show and product names in light of then-upcoming 21st century, and Hodgson thought it would set his show apart to make it "3000". Dr. Forrester was named after the main character of The War of the Worlds. The Satellite of Love was named after the song of the same name by Lou Reed. Crow T. Robot was inspired by the song "Crow" from Jim Carroll's Catholic Boy, while Rocket Number 9's name was inspired by the original name of Sun Ra's album Interstellar Low Ways.

The theater shots, the primary component of an episode, are taped in "Shadowrama". The "seats" were a black-painted foam core board sitting behind the seat (towards the camera) for the host, and stages for the Crow and Tom puppets. The human host wore black clothing while the robot puppets were painted black; the screen they watched was a white luma key screen so as to create the appearance of silhouettes. The actors would follow the movie and the script through television monitors located in front of them, as to create the overall theater illusion.

The "door sequence" was created to transition from host segments to the theater segments, which Hodgson took inspiration from the Mickey Mouse Club, noting that the commonality to the title credits of Get Smart was coincidental. In devising this sequence, this also led to Beaulieu creating the dogbone-like shape of the Satellite of Love with additional inspiration taken from the bone-to-ship transition in the film 2001: A Space Odyssey. Hodgson had wanted to use a "motivated camera" for taping, a concept related to motivated lighting; in this mode, all the shots would appear to have been taken from an actual camera that was part of the scene to make the scene appear more realistic. This led to the creation of Cambot as a robot that the host would speak to during host segments or recording them while in the theater, and Rocket Number Nine to show footage outside of the Satellite of Love.

The show's theme song, the "Love Theme from Mystery Science Theater 3000", was written by Hodgson and Weinstein, which helped to cement some of the broader narrative elements of the show, such as the Mads and Joel being part of an experiment. The song was composed by Charlie Erickson with help from Hodgson in the style of Devo, The Replacements, and The Rivieras (particularly their cover of the song "California Sun") and sung by Hodgson. Initial shows used foam letters to make the show's title, but they later created the spinning-moon logo out of a 2-foot (0.6m) diameter fiberglass ball, covered with foam insulation and the lettering cut from additional foam pieces. Hodgson felt they needed a logo with the rotating effect as opposed to a flat 2D image, and though they had envisioned a more detailed prop, with the letters being the tops of buildings on this moon, they had no time or budget for a project of that complexity and went with what they had. Musical numbers would also be used as part of the host segments, which Hodgson said came out naturally from the riffing process; they would find themselves at times singing along with the movie instead of just riffing at it, and took that to extend songs into the host segments.

=== KTMA era (1988–1989) ===
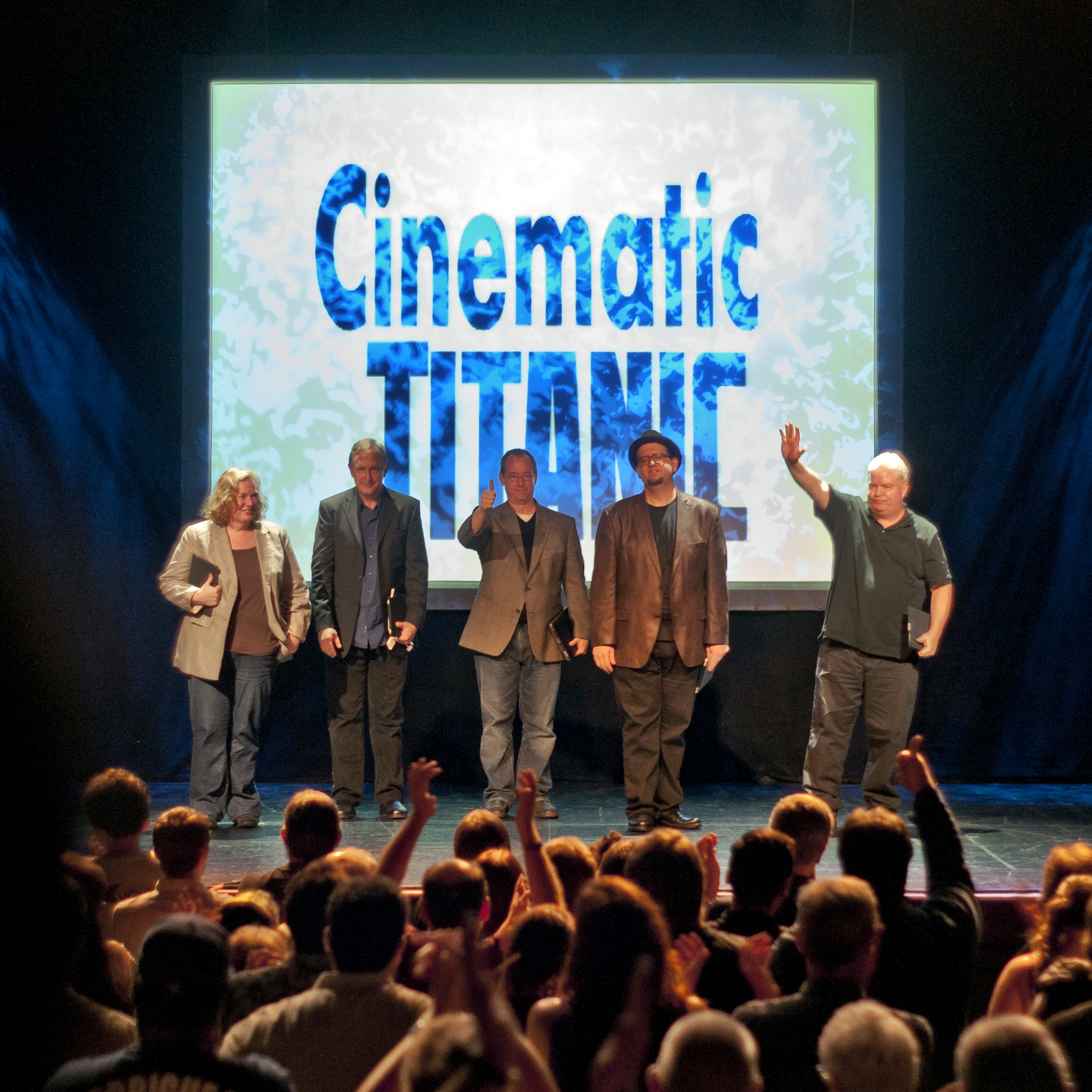
MST3K cast and crew members Pehl (left), Beaulieu, Hodgson, Weinstein, and Conniff, as part of the post-show project Cinematic Titanic in 2011

Hodgson approached Jim Mallon, at the time the production manager of KTMA, a low-budget local Minneapolis-area independent television station, with his idea of a show based on riffing on movies, using robots that were created out of common objects. Mallon agreed to help produce a pilot episode, and Hodgson hired local area comedians J. Elvis Weinstein (initially going by Josh Weinstein but later changed to J. Elvis as to distinguish himself from Josh Weinstein, a well-known writer for The Simpsons) and Trace Beaulieu to develop the pilot show. By September 1988, Hodgson, Mallon, Weinstein, and Beaulieu shot a 30-minute pilot episode, using segments from the 1968 science-fiction film The Green Slime. The robots and the set were built by Hodgson in an all-nighter. Joel watched the movie by himself, and was aided during the host segments by his robots, Crow (Beaulieu), Beeper, and Gypsy (Weinstein). Hodgson used the narrative that his character named "Joel Hodgson" (not yet using his character name of Robinson) had built the Satellite of Love and launched himself into space. Camera work was by Kevin Murphy, who was employed by KTMA. Murphy also created the first doorway sequence and theater seat design. These initial episodes were recorded at the long since-defunct Paragon Cable studios and customer service center in Hopkins, Minnesota. On review, Hodgson found that of the robots, Beeper's design was not working well, and tried a quick modification by replacing its head with a toy gumball machine top, creating the basis of Tom Servo.

Mallon met with KTMA station manager Donald O'Conner the next month and managed to get signed up for thirteen episodes. Show production was generally done on a 24-hour cycle, starting with Mallon offering a few films from KTMA's library for the writers to select from. Riffing in these episodes was ad-libbed during taping using notes made during preliminary viewings of the selected film. Episodes from this era are noted for their low number of riffs—in some instances 15 minutes of the movie could be shown before the cast made any comments. The show had some slight alterations from the pilot—the set was lit differently, the robots (now Crow, Servo and Gypsy) joined Joel in the theater, and a new doorway countdown sequence between the host and theater segments was shot. The puppeteers worked personalities into their robots: Crow (Beaulieu) was considered a robotic Groucho Marx, Tom Servo (Weinstein) as a "smarmy AM radio DJ", and Gypsy (Mallon) modeled after Mallon's mother who had a "heart of gold" but would become disoriented when confronted with a difficult task. The development of the show's theme song would lead to establishing elements for the show's ongoing premise, with Hodgson now portraying himself as the character Joel Robinson.

Mystery Science Theater 3000 premiered on KTMA at 6:00 p.m. on Thanksgiving Day, November 24, 1988, with its first episode, Invaders from the Deep, followed by a second episode, Revenge of the Mysterons from Mars at 8:00 p.m. The choice of running the premiere on Thanksgiving was by happenstance, as the station felt the show was ready to go at that point, according to Hodgson. Initially, the show's response was unknown, until Mallon set up a phone line for viewers to call in. Response was so great that the initial run of 13 episodes was extended to 21, with the show running to May 1989. Hodgson and Mallon negotiated to secure the rights for the show for themselves, creating Best Brains, Inc., agreeing to split ownership of the idea equally. During this time a fan club was set up and the show held its first live show at Scott Hansen's Comedy Gallery in Minneapolis, to a crowd of over 600.

Despite the show's success, the station's overall declining fortunes forced it to file for bankruptcy reorganization in July 1989. At the same time, HBO was looking to build a stable of shows for their upcoming Comedy Channel cable network. HBO approached Best Brains and requested a sample of their material. Hodgson and Mallon provided a seven-minute demo reel, which led to the network greenlighting MST3K as one of the first two shows picked up by the new network. According to Art Bell, one of the creators of the Comedy Channel, MST3K's arrival helped the network to fill space that they had originally planned to use short clips of films and television shows that they could not license in time for launch.

=== Comedy Channel (1989–1991) and Comedy Central (1991–1996) eras ===
The Brain That Wouldn't Die, a 1962 film mocked in season five

The Comedy Channel offered Best Brains $35,000 per episode but allowed Best Brains to retain the show's rights. Best Brains was also able to keep production local to Minnesota instead of the network's desire to film in New York City or Los Angeles, as it would have cost four times more per episode, according to Hodgson. Best Brains established an office and warehouse space in Eden Prairie for filming. With an expanded but still limited budget, they were able to hire more writers, including Mike Nelson, Mary Jo Pehl, and Frank Conniff, and build more expansive sets and robot puppets. They retained the characters of Dr. Forrester (Beaulieu) and Dr. Erhardt (Weinstein) from the KTMA era and crafted the larger narrative of each episode being an "experiment" they test on Joel. The show began its national run shortly after The Comedy Channel went on the air in November 1989.

MST3K was considered The Comedy Channel's signature program, generating positive press about the show despite the limited availability of the cable channel nationwide. After the second season, The Comedy Channel and rival comedy cable network HA! merged to become CTV: The Comedy Network (later changed to Comedy Central). During this period, MST3K became the newly merged cable channel's signature series, expanding from 13 to 24 episodes a year. To take advantage of the show's status, Comedy Central ran "Turkey Day", a 30-hour marathon of MST3K episodes during Thanksgiving 1991. The name of the event was not only inspired by the traditional turkey meal served on Thanksgiving, but also by use of "Turkey" from The Golden Turkey Awards to represent bad movies. This tradition would be continued through the rest of the Comedy Central era. Though the show did not draw large audience numbers compared to other programming on Comedy Central, such as reruns of Saturday Night Live, the dedicated fans and attention kept the show on the network.

Mystery Science Theater 3000: The Movie was produced during the later half of the Comedy Central era and had a very limited theatrical release in 1996 through Universal Pictures and Gramercy Pictures. It featured Mike and the bots subjected to the film This Island Earth by Dr. Forrester. Though well received by critics and fans, the film was a financial disappointment due to its limited distribution.

==== Writing and taping ====
The cable network was able to provide a wider library of films for Best Brains to riff from. To ensure that they would be able to produce a funny episode, at least one member of the staff would watch the suggested films completely, generally assuring that the movie would be prime for jokes throughout. Conniff stated that he often would have to watch around twenty films in their entirety before selecting one to use for the show. In one specific case, the second-season episode with the 1969 film The Sidehackers, they had only skimmed the first part of the movie before making the decision to use it, and only later discovered that it contained a scene where a female character is brutally raped and murdered. They decided to stay committed to the film, but cut out the offending scene and had to explain the sudden absence of the affected character to the audience. After this, they carefully scrutinized entire films for other such offensive content, and once one was selected and assured the rights, committed to completing the episode with that film. Obtaining the rights was handled by the cable networks. Some licensing required buying film rights in packages, with the selected bad movies included in a catalog of otherwise good films, making the negotiations odd since the network was only interested in the bad film. Other times, the rights to the film were poorly documented, and the network would follow the chain of custody to locate the copyright owner so as to secure broadcast rights.

In contrast to the ad-libbing of riffs from KTMA, the riffs were scripted ahead of time by the writers. An average episode (approximately 90 minutes running time) would contain more than 600 such riffs, and some with upwards of 800 riffs. Riffs were developed with the entire writing staff watching the film together several times through, giving off-the-cuff quips and jokes as the film went along, or identifying where additional material would be helpful for the comedy. The best jokes were polished into the script for the show. Riffs were developed to keep in line with the characterization of Joel, Mike, and the 'bots. Further, the writers tried to maintain respect for the films and avoided making negative riffs about them, taking into consideration that Joel, Mike, and the 'bots were companions to the audience while watching the movie, and they did not want to come off sounding like jerks even if the negative riff would be funny. Hodgson stated that their goal in writing riffs is not to ridicule films as some have often mistaken, but to rather instead consider what they are doing as "a variety show built on the back of a movie".

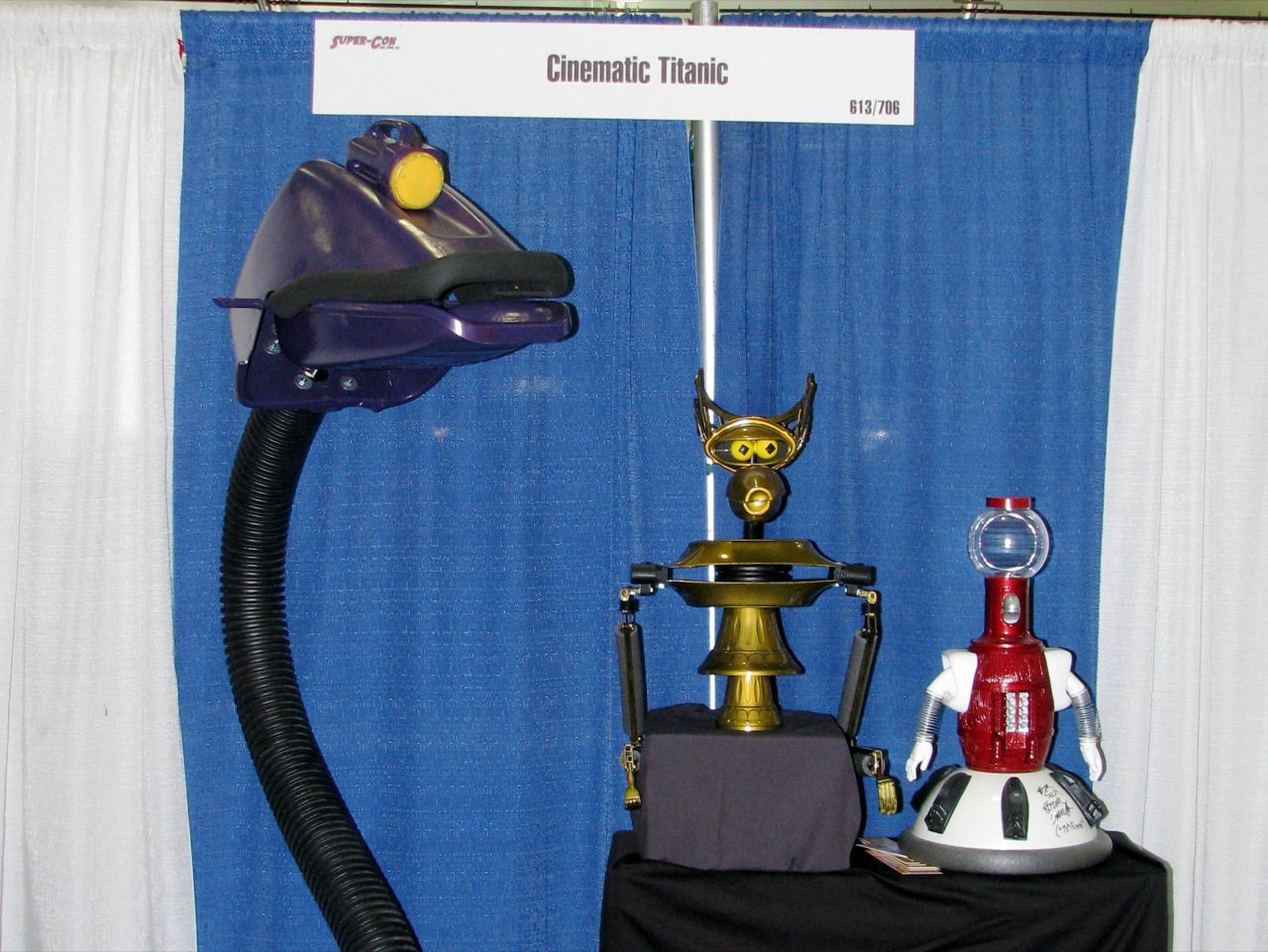
The 'bots of MST3K as they appeared through the majority of its run: Gypsy (left), Crow T. Robot, and Tom Servo. The 'bots were created by Hodgson and fashioned out of common household objects.

Production of an average episode of MST3K during the Comedy Central period took about five to nine days once the movie was selected and its rights secured. The first few days were generally used for watching the movie and scripting out the riffs and live action segments. The subsequent days were then generally used to start construction of any props or sets that would be needed for the live action segments while the writers honed the script. A full dress rehearsal would then be held, making sure the segments and props worked and fine tuning the script. The host segments would then be taped on one day, and the theater segments on the next. A final day was used to review the completed work and correct any major flaws they caught before considering the episode complete. Live scenes used only practical special effects, and there was minimal post-editing once taping was completed.

==== Cast changes ====
Weinstein left the show after the first Comedy Channel season, reportedly in disagreement with Hodgson about moving toward using scripted rather than ad-libbed jokes. Murphy replaced him as the voice of Tom Servo, portraying the 'bot as a cultured individual, while Dr. Erhardt was replaced with TV's Frank (Conniff).

Hodgson decided to leave the series halfway through Season Five due to his dislike of being on camera and his disagreements with producer Mallon over creative control of the program. Hodgson also stated that Mallon's insistence on producing a feature film version of the show led to his departure, giving up his rights on the MST3K property to Mallon. Hodgson later told an interviewer: "If I had the presence of mind to try and work it out, I would rather have stayed. 'Cause I didn't want to go, it just seemed like I needed to." Though they held casting calls for a replacement for Hodgson on camera, the crew found that none of the potential actors really fit the role; instead, having reviewed a test run that Nelson had done with the 'bots, the crew agreed that having Nelson (who had already appeared in several guest roles on the show) replace Hodgson would be the least jarring approach. The replacement of Joel by Mike would lead to an oft-joking "Joel vs. Mike flame war" among fans, similar to the "Kirk vs. Picard" discussions in the Star Trek fandom.

Conniff left the show after Season Six, looking to get into writing TV sitcoms in Hollywood. TV's Frank was soon replaced on the show by Dr. Forrester's mother, Pearl (Pehl).

==== Cancellation ====
By 1996, Comedy Central had started creating an identity for its network under the new leadership of Doug Herzog, which would lead to successful shows like The Daily Show, Win Ben Stein's Money, South Park and Dr. Katz, Professional Therapist. This left MST3K as an oddity on the network taking up limited program space. Although acknowledging that MST3K "helped put the network on the map" and that its fans were "passionate", Herzog believed it was necessary to change things around due to the show's lackluster and declining ratings. Comedy Central cancelled MST3K after a six-episode seventh season. The final original episode Laserblast, was broadcast on May 18, 1996; repeats of the show continued on Comedy Central until December.

=== Sci-Fi Channel era (1997–1999) ===
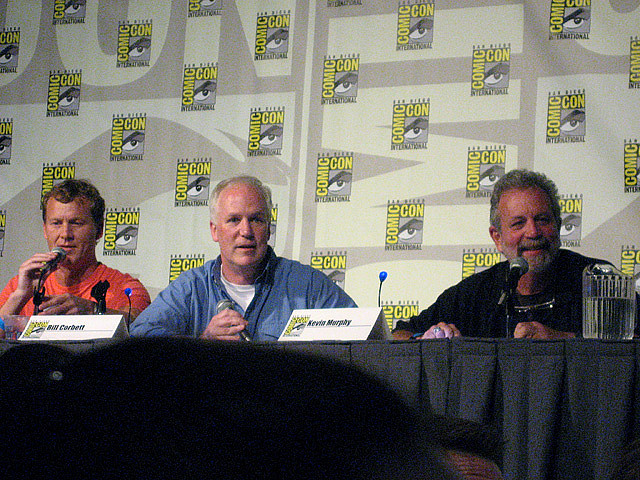
Nelson, Corbett, and Murphy, the primary actors in the Sci-Fi channel era, as part of their RiffTrax panel in 2009

The show staff continued to operate for as long as they still had finances to work with. MST3K's fan base staged a write-in campaign to keep the show alive. This effort led the Sci-Fi Channel, a subsidiary of USA Networks, to pick up the series. Rod Perth, then-president of programming for USA Networks, helped to bring the show to the Sci-Fi Channel, stating himself to be a huge fan of the show and believing that "the sci-fi genre took itself too seriously and that this show was a great way of lightening up our own presentation".

Writing and production of the show remained relatively unchanged from the Comedy Central period. Before Season Eight commenced filming, Beaulieu opted to leave the show, feeling that anything creative that would be produced by Best Brains would belong to Mallon, and wanted to have more creative ownership himself. To replace Dr. Forrester, two new sidekicks to Pearl were introduced: Professor Bobo (Murphy) and the Observer, a.k.a. "Brain Guy" (Corbett). In addition, Corbett took over Crow's voice and puppetry and Best Brains staffer Patrick Brantseg took over Gypsy in the middle of Season Eight. With this replacement, the series' entire original cast had been turned over.

MST3K ran for three more seasons on the Sci-Fi Channel. During the Sci-Fi era, Best Brains found themselves more limited by the network: the pool of available films was smaller and they were required to use science fiction films (as per the network's name and programming focus), and the USA Network executives managing the show wanted to see story arcs during host segments and had more demands on how the show should be produced. Conflict between Best Brains and the network executives eventually led to the show's second cancellation. Peter Keepnews, writing for The New York Times, noted that the frequent cast changes, as well as the poorer selection of films that he felt were more boring than bizarre in their execution, had caused the show to lose its original appeal. Another campaign to save the show was mounted, including several MST3K fans taking contributions for a full-page ad in the trade publication Daily Variety magazine, but unlike the first effort, this campaign was unsuccessful.

The Season 10 finale, Danger: Diabolik, premiered on August 8, 1999, during which, in the show's narrative, Pearl Forrester accidentally sends the Satellite of Love out of orbit, with Mike and the 'bots escaping and taking up residence in an apartment near Milwaukee, where they continue to riff movies. A "lost" episode produced earlier in the season but delayed due to rights issues, Merlin's Shop of Mystical Wonders, was the final Season 10 episode of MST3K (and the last of the original run), broadcast on September 12, 1999. Reruns continued to air on the Sci Fi Channel for several years, ending with The Screaming Skull on January 31, 2004. The shows later moved to off-network syndication.

Following the end of the Sci-Fi channel series, staff members amicably parted to pursue related movie riffing projects, notably the live show Cinematic Titanic and the online RiffTrax; see § Related post-show projects below.

=== Netflix era revival (2017–2018) ===
==== Kickstarter funding ====
Starting in 2010, Hodgson had been trying to bring back MST3K, spurred on by fan appreciation of the cast and crew 25 years since the show's premiere and the success of his Cinematic Titanic project. Hodgson also considered the timing to be ideal, with non-traditional outlets like Netflix picking up original series, and the success of crowdfunding for entertainment projects. However, Hodgson needed to reacquire the rights to the series, at that point still held by Mallon and Best Brains. By 2013, Hodgson was working closely with Shout! Factory, the distribution company handling the home media releases of MST3K, and completed negotiations with Mallon to buy the rights for MST3K for a seven-figure sum by August 2015, enabling a Kickstarter campaign to fund the revival to move forward. Hodgson felt the Kickstarter approach was necessary so that the show's style and approach would be determined by fans rather than through a network if he had sought traditional broadcast funding, as well as to demonstrate the demand for the show through a successful campaign.

The Kickstarter was launched in November 2015, seeking $2 million for the production of three episodes, with stretch goals with additional funding for 12 total episodes. The Kickstarter effort was led by Ivan Askwith, a consultant who also had worked on the Veronica Mars and Reading Rainbow Kickstarter campaigns. Hodgson estimated each episode would take $250,000 to make, in addition to five-figure movie licensing rights, in contrast to $100,000 per episode needed for the original series. The campaign reached its base funding within a week of its launch. On the final day of the campaign, Hodgson and Shout! ran a streaming telethon which included appearances from the newly selected cast and crew, and various celebrities that supported the revival to help exceed the target funding levels for twelve episodes. The campaign ended on December 11, 2015, with total funding of $5,764,229 from 48,270 backers, with an additional $600,000 in backer add-ons, which allowed Hodgson to plan two more additional episodes, including a Christmas episode, to bring the total season to fourteen episodes. The Kickstarter became the largest one for Film & Video, surpassing the $5.70 million raised for the Veronica Mars film, but was ultimately surpassed in March 2019 for an animated series based on the web series Critical Role.

==== Casting ====
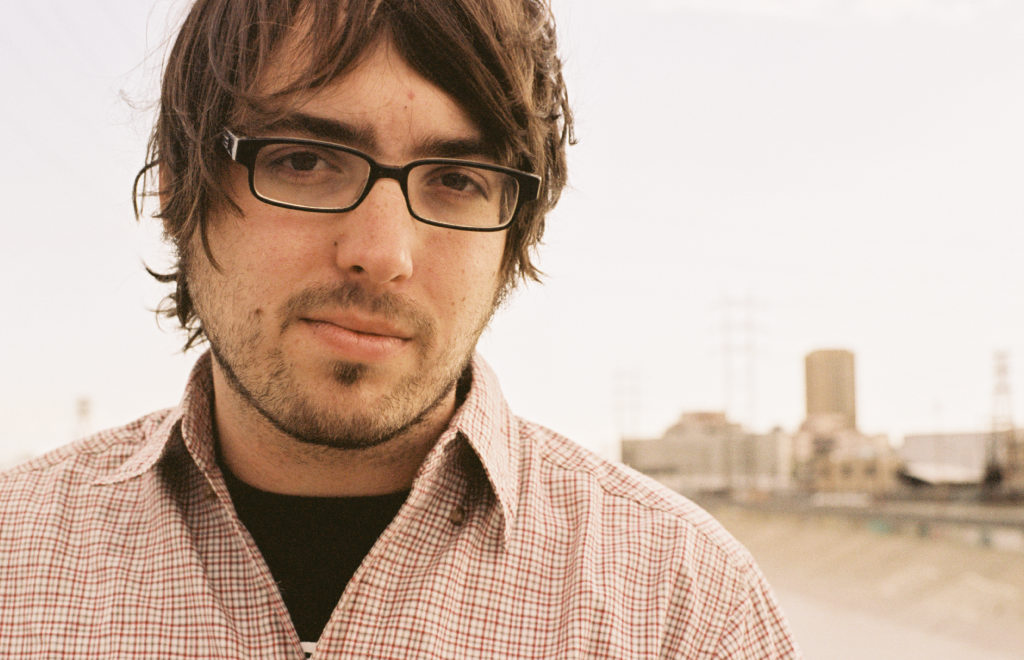
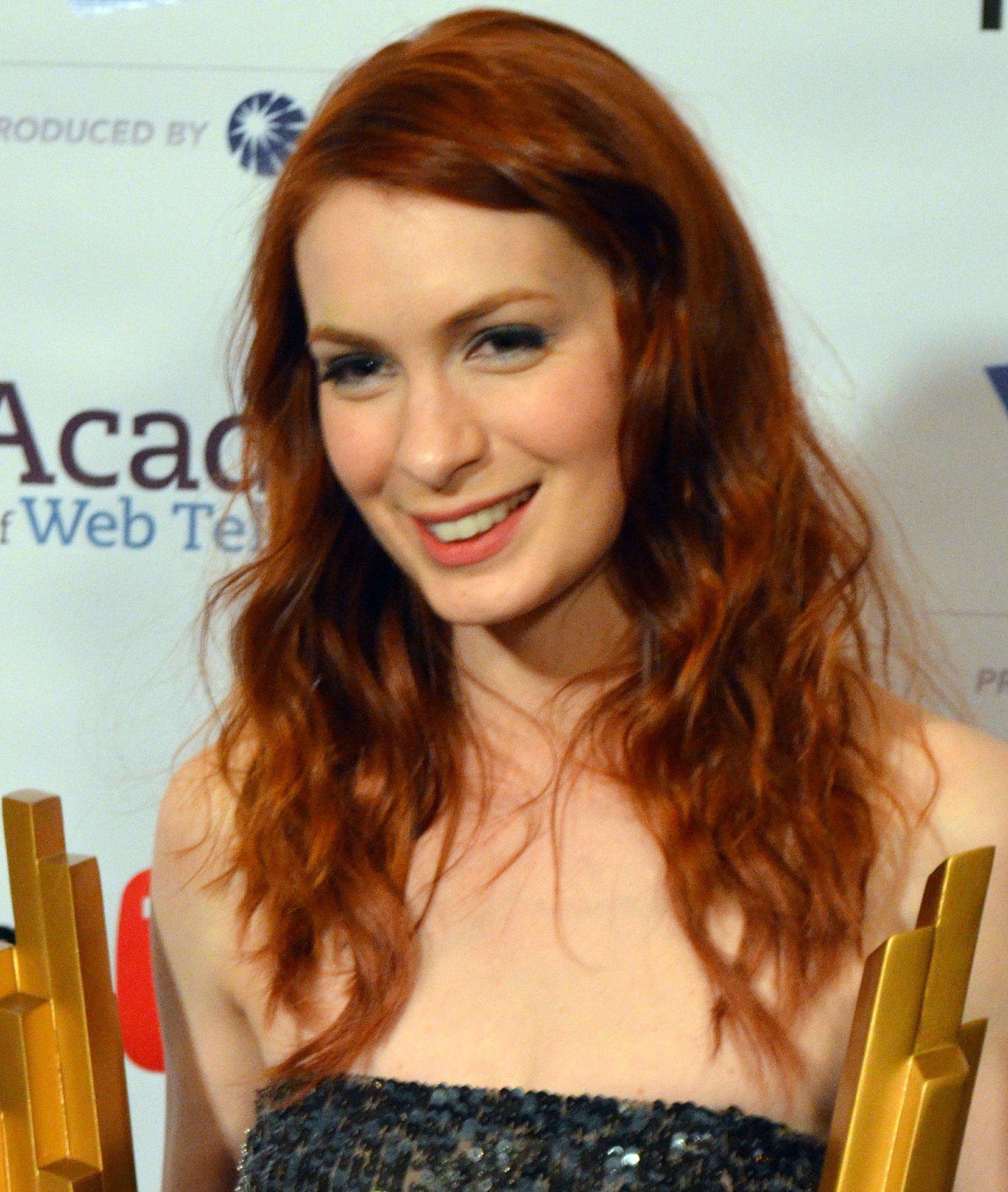
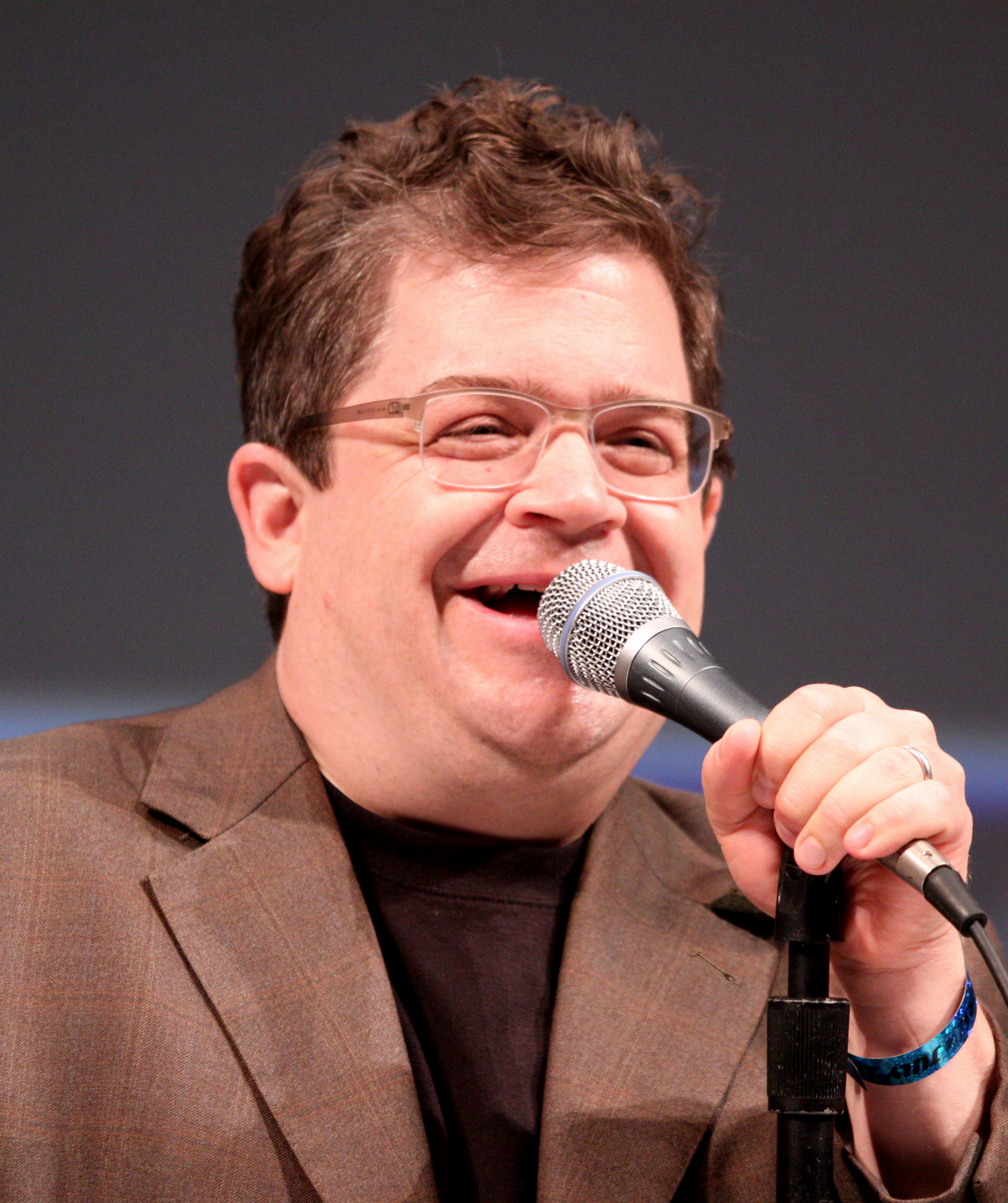
The revival features Ray (top) aboard the Satellite of Love, Day (bottom left) as Kinga Forrester, and Oswalt as Max, aka TV's Son of TV's Frank

Hodgson believed that the revival would need a whole new cast, pointing out that the cast had completely turned over in the original series. Comedian Jonah Ray plays Jonah Heston, the new host aboard the Satellite of Love, watching and riffing on the films. Hodgson had met Ray while recording an episode of The Nerdist Podcast, and felt he would be a good fit. The voices of Crow and Tom Servo are provided by comedians Hampton Yount and Baron Vaughn, respectively, both of whom Ray recommended to Hodgson. Hodgson felt it was important for Ray to have his say on who would play these parts, since it would help Ray be comfortable in the role. Felicia Day plays Kinga Forrester, Clayton Forrester's daughter and one of the new Mads in charge of the experiments, now operating out of a moon base known as "Moon 13". Day had been one of the last to be cast, as Hodgson had scripted out the concept for Forrester's daughter while casting Ray and the others. Hodgson had met Day at the 2015 Salt Lake Comic Con, where she stated her love of MST3K to him. Hodgson had seen Day's performance in shows like The Guild and Dr. Horrible's Sing-Along Blog, and felt she matched his idea for the character he had envisioned. Patton Oswalt plays Kinga's henchman, Max, or as his character prefers to be known, "TV's Son of TV's Frank"; Hodgson had already planned to invite Oswalt, a longtime friend and self-professed MST3K fan, as a special guest writer for an episode of the revived series, but decided during the Kickstarter that he would also be a good fit on-camera. Rebecca Hanson, an alum of The Second City, took the role of Gypsy as well as Synthia, a clone of Pearl Forrester who assists Kinga. Har Mar Superstar leads the "Skeleton Crew", a house band in Kinga's lair.

Pehl, Corbett, and Murphy cameo on the revival, reprising their roles as Pearl, Brain Guy, and Professor Bobo, respectively. Hodgson opened up to the show any of the other cast members to make cameo appearances or aid in the creative process. However, Nelson and Beaulieu stated that they would not be involved with the MST3K revival; Nelson said, "The brand does not belong to me, and I make and have made (almost) zero dollars off it since it stopped production in 1999." Conniff noted on his Twitter that Shout! Factory would be "cutting [the former cast members] in, financially at least" on the profits from the series. In addition, other cameos on the new episodes include Neil Patrick Harris, Jerry Seinfeld, and Mark Hamill as P. T. Mindslap. Weinstein initially stated that he had no interest in returning to the show, but eventually reprised his role as Dr. Laurence Erhardt in Seasons 12 and 13.

==== Writing and recording ====
Hodgson aimed to follow in the pattern of what made for fan-favorite episodes from the original series, borrowing equally from the Joel and Mike eras; he noted there were about 30 episodes that he and fans universally agreed were the show's best, and expected to use these as templates as the basis of the new show. The new episodes include the Invention Exchange that had been part of the Joel era (and some of the Mike era) of the show. Additionally, while not required by the streaming format of Netflix, the new episodes include bumpers that would have wrapped around commercial breaks if shown on network television; Hodgson considered these breaks necessary as a "palate cleanser" as well as to support the narrative for Kinga attempting to commercialize on the MST3K brand.

Behind the scenes, the lead writer was Elliott Kalan, former head writer for The Daily Show with Jon Stewart and host of The Flop House, a podcast about bad movies. Dan Harmon and Joel McHale also wrote for the show, along with the on-screen cast members. Hodgson also brought in guest writers for certain episodes that included Justin Roiland, Rob Schrab, Nell Scovell, Ernie Cline, Pat Rothfuss, Dana Gould, and Tammy Golden. Additionally, Paul & Storm and Robert Lopez composed original songs for the new episodes.

The revival retains the live, handcrafted look from the original, a decision that Hodgson had to set down against others involved in production. Set and prop designers included Wayne White, Aaron Somers, Pen Ward, Rebecca Sugar and her younger brother Steven, Justin Jacobs, and Guy Davis, while live and practical special effects were planned by Adam Savage. Justin was tasked with creating full sized versions of new robots M. Waverly and Growler. Other returning staff included: Charlie Erickson, who composed the original show's theme song and composed the new show's theme and other musical arrangements; Beth "Beez" McKeever, who worked on the original show's props and designed costumes and props for the new show; Crist Ballas created hair and makeup design; and Paul Chaplin, one of the show's original writers to help write the new shows, along with contributions from Pehl and Corbett. Hodgson himself remained primarily off-camera as the executive producer for the remake, though does appear briefly as Ardy, one of Kinga's henchmen who send Jonah the episode's movie. Hodgson was assisted by Kalan, Richard Foos, Bob Emmer, Garson Foos, Jonathan Stern, and Harold Buchholz. The revival was produced by the companies Satellite of Love, LLC, Alternaversal Productions, and Abominable Pictures.

Production for the new season began on January 4, 2016, with movie selection and script writing. The film selection was narrowed down to about twenty movies as of February 2016, with the rights obtained for about half of them, while Shout! Factory was working to secure worldwide distribution rights for the others. Hodgson noted that the films were more recent than those used on the original series, with "maybe one" from the 1950s/1960s, but did not want to reveal what these films were until the episodes were broadcast as to have the biggest comedic effect on the audience.

Recording and most of the production was completed over September and October 2016 in Los Angeles on a very condensed schedule. In the revival, Ray, Yount, and Vaughn recorded the riffs for all fourteen episodes in a sound studio over a period of a week, allowing them to better synchronize the riffs with the film. This also helped to simplify the process of recording the theater segments, since they then only needed to act out their parts. The 'bots were controlled by multiple puppeteers both in the theater and in skits; Yount and Vaughn used radio-controlled equipment to move the 'bots' mouths, while members from The Jim Henson Company helped with manipulating the bodies, allowing them to achieve effects they could not do in the series' original run such as having Crow appear to walk on his own. All skits for the episodes were completed within a single day, which did not allow them for doing multiple takes unless necessary.

Campaign backers at higher tiers were able to see the first episode at limited "Red Carpet Kickstarter Screening" events shown in a few theaters during February and March 2017. The fourteen episodes were released on Netflix on April 14, 2017, though Kickstarter backers had the opportunity to see the episodes in the days preceding this.

During the 2017 "Turkey Day" Marathon, Hodgson announced that Netflix had greenlit a twelfth season of MST3K. Shooting of the twelfth season started on June 4, 2018, and would have six episodes, written to encourage bingewatching and make the series more amenable to non-fans. Further, they created a stronger narrative in the host segments, so that casual viewers would recognize the series having a definitive start, middle, and end. Other changes included Rob Schrab coming on as co-director, and actress Deanna Rooney, Ray's wife, playing Dr. Donna St. Phibes, a "B-movie monster conservationist" who works with the Mads. Former cast member Weinstein returned to reprise his role as Dr. Erhardt. Hodgson had been trying to also bring back both Beaulieu and Conniff for this season, but could not work out the logistics in time.

The 12th season was broadcast on Netflix on Thanksgiving aka "Turkey Day", November 22, 2018, which coincided with the show's 30th anniversary. To avoid conflicting with the new season's release, the annual Turkey Day Marathon was pushed forward to November 18, 2018.

In November 2019, Hodgson confirmed to Kickstarter backers that the show would not return for a third season on Netflix, but that he would be looking into alternative outlets to carry the show. The two seasons made for Netflix will remain on the service. Ray stated in an April 2020 interview that "Joel's got some ideas in the pipeline, and it's pretty exciting, what he's working on", and expected further news later in the year. Hodgson had praised Netflix for helping to bring new fans to MST3K and said that his production company Alternaversal Productions was still looking for ways to bring the show back through other means, though he did criticize Netflix for forcing an embargo that kept him from providing updates to his fans on the progress on the show until they were ready to announce details.

=== Gizmoplex era (2022) ===
On April 7, 2021, Hodgson launched a second Kickstarter campaign to continue production of more MST3K episodes. Given the difficulties with Netflix, Hodgson envisioned a sustainable production approach based on the support of fans and backers who wanted more episodes but without having to worry about the financial support of a broadcast or cable network. In this project, Hodgson set out to produce more episodes and the creation of "The Gizmoplex", an online platform designed to showcase these new episodes as well as reruns of past episodes and live events, presented as another experiment by the Mads. Hodgson said that while the Netflix support was helpful for the prior two seasons, the streamer had required the production team to produce all their episodes at once, which did not work well and resulted in creative burn-out. By using the Gizmoplex approach, the production team would be able to produce new content at their own pace. Further, by establishing the continuation of the show in the Gizmoplex format, MST3K could continue even without Hodgson's involvement, so long as the demand from fans of the show remained.

During the Kickstarter, Hodgson confirmed that due to the name being seen by some as an ethnic slur against Romani and other itinerant peoples, Gypsy was renamed to GPC around 2019.

The Kickstarter surpassed its minimum funding goal of $2 million within 25 hours of launch, and ended with over $6.5 million raised, assuring that thirteen regular episodes would be produced, including the series' first 3D episode as well as special Halloween and Christmas episodes. Most of the Netflix series cast – including Ray, Vaughn, Yount, Hanson, Day, and Oswalt – return to their roles. A new hosting cast features Emily Marsh, who had participated in the live tours during the Netflix years, portraying Emily Connor as the test subject, along with other live show performers Conor McGiffin, Kelsey Ann Brady, and Yvonne Freese voicing Tom, Crow, and GPC 2, respectively; Freese would also play Mega Synthia. The last name Connor was in reference to Sarah Connor from the Terminator franchise. Hodgson reprised his Joel Robinson character for three episodes. Pehl and Weinstein reprised their roles as Pearl Forrester and Dr. Laurence Erhardt, respectively, within this block of episodes. Further, Nelson, Murphy, and Corbett of RiffTrax offered some of their material to be included in the Gizmoplex's archives.

During the annual 2021 Turkey Day Marathon, the thirteen movies to be riffed as part of the 13th season were announced. These include: Santo in The Treasure of Dracula, Robot Wars, Beyond Atlantis, Munchie, Doctor Mordrid, Demon Squad, Gamera vs. Jiger, The Batwoman, The Million Eyes of Sumuru, H. G. Wells' The Shape of Things to Come, The Mask, The Bubble, and The Christmas Dragon. The first three were presented to backers as pre-release versions starting on March 4, 2022, as a means of testing the Gizmoplex. The public launch of the platform and the thirteenth season premiere happened on May 6, 2022. The second and third episodes premiered on succeeding days, with the remaining episodes and shorts premiering every two weeks afterwards. A year after the season was first shown on the Gizmoplex service, episodes were made available through the MST3K channel on PlutoTV.

Fundraising for a fourteenth season began in October 2023, with a minimum target of $4.8 million to bring six full movies and six shorts and a stretch goal of $7.4 million for twelve of each. The goal was later adjusted to $4 million for six full movies and shorts in an attempt to complete the base goal due to slowing donations on the in-house crowdfunding platform. The campaign failed to reach its lowered goal, with only 68% raised. Without funds to produce season 14, the series was once again in hiatus. The Gizmoplex announced in May 2026 that it would be shutting down by September 30, 2026, allowing users to download episodes from the site until then, with episodes otherwise still available through many streaming options like FilmRise and Shout! TV.

=== RiffTrax era (2026–present) ===
In January 2026, Hodgson, acting through Alternaversal, sold the MST3K property rights to Radial Entertainment—the result of the merger between Shout! Studios and FilmRise. Radial planned to continue to develop more MST3K content, with Hodgson remaining as a brand ambassador and consultant, which allows him the freedom to explore new projects.

In February 2026, Nelson, Murphy, and Corbett announced the start of production on four new episodes of MST3K, dubbed The RiffTrax Experiments, with the trio reprising the roles of Mike, Tom Servo/Bobo, and Crow/Brain Guy, respectively, along with Pehl returning as Pearl. According to Nelson, he had heard rumors of Hodgson's sale of the MST3K property and was subsequently approached about returning to host new episodes. Nelson said that much of the work to get the old crew back came from Murphy's connections, and that because these new episodes were mostly to test the waters and bring the original crew up to speed, they opted for only four episodes to start, with the possibility of producing more if successful.

The production was partially financed by a Kickstarter with a nominal goal of $20,000, part of RiffTrax's 20th anniversary; production would have gone forward even if the Kickstarter failed. However, by the completion of the campaign, nearly $2.7 million had been raised.

Beaulieu and Conniff reprise their roles as the Mads, guest-starring in and co-writing the fourth episode. Beaulieu also acts as art director for all the new episodes. Jonathan Coulton performs the theme song, produced by Paul and Storm; all three have previously worked with RiffTrax.

The movies riffed include Deathsport (1978), Space Raiders (1983), and Sting of Death (1966). Deathsport also includes a short. The first episode, Sting of Death, was presented in theaters through Fathom Entertainment on September 9, 2026, with an encore showing September 13. The episodes will be released through RiffTrax, starting October 9 through November 19, 2026.

== Cast ==
Cast of Mystery Science Theater 3000
Actress / Actor	Characters	Seasons															
Actress / Actor	Characters	KTMA	Comedy Channel		Comedy Central					The Movie	Sci-Fi			Netflix		Gizmoplex	RiffTrax
Actress / Actor	Characters	0	1	2	3	4	5	6	7	The Movie	8	9	10	11	12	13	14
Joel Hodgson	Joel Robinson; Ardy	Main	Main	Main	Main	Main	Main	—N/a	—N/a	—N/a	—N/a	—N/a	Guest	Main	Main	Main	—N/a
Trace Beaulieu	Crow T. Robot; Dr. Clayton Forrester	Main	Main	Main	Main	Main	Main	Main	Main	Main	—N/a	—N/a	—N/a	—N/a	—N/a	—N/a	Guest (Note: As Dr. Clayton Forrester only)
J. Elvis Weinstein	Tom Servo; Dr. Laurence Erhardt; Gypsy	Main	Main	—N/a	—N/a	—N/a	—N/a	—N/a	—N/a	—N/a	—N/a	—N/a	—N/a	—N/a	Recurring	Recurring	—N/a
Jim Mallon	Gypsy	—N/a	Main	Main	Main	Main	Main	Main	Main	Main	Main	—N/a	—N/a	—N/a	—N/a	—N/a	—N/a
Kevin Murphy	Tom Servo; Professor Bobo	—N/a	—N/a	Main	Main	Main	Main	Main	Main	Main	Main	Main	Main	Recurring	—N/a	—N/a	Main
Frank Conniff	TV's Frank	—N/a	—N/a	Main	Main	Main	Main	Main	—N/a	—N/a	—N/a	—N/a	Guest	—N/a	—N/a	—N/a	Guest
Michael J. Nelson	various bit parts Mike Nelson	—N/a	—N/a	Recurring	Recurring	Recurring	Main	Main	Main	Main	Main	Main	Main	—N/a	—N/a	—N/a	Main
Mary Jo Pehl	various bit parts Pearl Forrester	—N/a	—N/a	—N/a	—N/a	—N/a	Recurring	Guest	Main	—N/a	Main	Main	Main	Recurring	—N/a	Recurring	Main
Bill Corbett	Crow T. Robot; Observer	—N/a	—N/a	—N/a	—N/a	—N/a	—N/a	—N/a	—N/a	—N/a	Main	Main	Main	Recurring	—N/a	—N/a	Main
Patrick Brantseg	Gypsy	—N/a	—N/a	—N/a	—N/a	—N/a	—N/a	—N/a	—N/a	—N/a	—N/a	Main	Main	—N/a	—N/a	—N/a	—N/a
Jonah Ray	Jonah Heston	—N/a	—N/a	—N/a	—N/a	—N/a	—N/a	—N/a	—N/a	—N/a	—N/a	—N/a	—N/a	Main	Main	Main	—N/a
Hampton Yount (with Grant Baciocco and Carla Rudy)	Crow T. Robot	—N/a	—N/a	—N/a	—N/a	—N/a	—N/a	—N/a	—N/a	—N/a	—N/a	—N/a	—N/a	Main	Main	Main	—N/a
Baron Vaughn (with Russ Walko and Erik Kuska)	Tom Servo	—N/a	—N/a	—N/a	—N/a	—N/a	—N/a	—N/a	—N/a	—N/a	—N/a	—N/a	—N/a	Main	Main	Main	—N/a
Rebecca Hanson (with Tim Blaney)	Gypsy / GPC; Synthia	—N/a	—N/a	—N/a	—N/a	—N/a	—N/a	—N/a	—N/a	—N/a	—N/a	—N/a	—N/a	Main	Main	Main	—N/a
Felicia Day	Kinga Forrester	—N/a	—N/a	—N/a	—N/a	—N/a	—N/a	—N/a	—N/a	—N/a	—N/a	—N/a	—N/a	Main	Main	Main	—N/a
Patton Oswalt	Max	—N/a	—N/a	—N/a	—N/a	—N/a	—N/a	—N/a	—N/a	—N/a	—N/a	—N/a	—N/a	Main	Main	Main	—N/a
Grant Baciocco	M. Waverly	—N/a												Guest	Recurring	Recurring	—N/a
Russ Walko	Growler	—N/a												Guest	Recurring	Recurring	—N/a
Deanna Rooney	Dr. Donna St. Phibes	—N/a	—N/a	—N/a	—N/a	—N/a	—N/a	—N/a	—N/a	—N/a	—N/a	—N/a	—N/a	—N/a	Guest	Guest	—N/a
Emily Marsh	Emily Connor	—N/a	—N/a	—N/a	—N/a	—N/a	—N/a	—N/a	—N/a	—N/a	—N/a	—N/a	—N/a	—N/a	—N/a	Main	—N/a
Conor McGiffin	Tom Servo	—N/a	—N/a	—N/a	—N/a	—N/a	—N/a	—N/a	—N/a	—N/a	—N/a	—N/a	—N/a	—N/a	—N/a	Main	—N/a
Kelsey Ann Brady (with Nate Begle)	Crow T Robot	—N/a	—N/a	—N/a	—N/a	—N/a	—N/a	—N/a	—N/a	—N/a	—N/a	—N/a	—N/a	—N/a	—N/a	Main	—N/a
Yvonne Freese	GPC 2, Mega Synthia	—N/a	—N/a	—N/a	—N/a	—N/a	—N/a	—N/a	—N/a	—N/a	—N/a	—N/a	—N/a	—N/a	—N/a	Main	—N/a

== Episodes ==
Season	Episodes	Originally released		
Season	Episodes	First released	Last released	Network
KTMA	21	November 24, 1988	May 28, 1989	KTMA-TV
1	13	November 18, 1989	February 10, 1990	The Comedy Channel
2	13	September 22, 1990	February 2, 1991	The Comedy Channel
3	24	June 1, 1991	January 25, 1992	Comedy Central
4	24	June 6, 1992	January 30, 1993	Comedy Central
5	24	July 17, 1993	February 5, 1994	Comedy Central
6	24	July 16, 1994	March 25, 1995	Comedy Central
7	6	November 23, 1995	May 18, 1996	Comedy Central
Film		April 19, 1996		—N/a
8	22	February 1, 1997	December 6, 1997	The Sci-Fi Channel
9	13	March 14, 1998	September 26, 1998	The Sci-Fi Channel
10	13	April 11, 1999	September 12, 1999	The Sci-Fi Channel
11	14	April 14, 2017		Netflix
12	6	November 22, 2018		Netflix
13	13	May 4, 2022	December 16, 2022	Gizmoplex
14	4	September 9, 2026	November 19, 2026	RiffTrax

The series, broadcast between 1988 and 1999, spanned 197 episodes across ten seasons. The 2017 Netflix revival of fourteen episodes (The Return) was followed by six additional episodes (The Gauntlet) the next year. An additional season on the Gizmoplex platform consisted of thirteen episodes and was released in 2022.

While the pilot episode of The Green Slime was used to sell the concept to KTMA, it never aired. The initial run of 21 episodes for KTMA were neither rerun nationally nor released onto home video, primarily due to rights issues—apparently KTMA never obtained the rights to show the movies that were riffed. For many years, the first three KTMA episodes were considered to be "missing episodes", as no fan copies are known to exist, though master copies of all these episodes reportedly exist according to Mallon. In November 2016, Hodgson reported that master copies of two of the episodes, "Invaders from the Deep" and "Revenge of the Mysterons from Mars", had been found. The episodes were made available to Kickstarter backers of the new series on November 25, 2016. The third episode was discovered on VHS from an estate sale in the Minneapolis area, and the buyer uploaded the digitized version in March 2026, completing the KTMA season availability.

The credits in the first four seasons on Comedy Central included the phrase "Keep circulating the tapes" to encourage fans to share VHS tapings they made with others (as Comedy Central was not widely distributed then), despite the questionable copyright practice. Though the phrase was removed from the credits for legal reasons, the concept of "keep circulating the tapes" was held by the show's fans to continue to help introduce others to the show following its broadcast run.

=== Turkey Day marathons ===
An annual event in the Comedy Central era was the Turkey Day marathon that ran on or near the Thanksgiving holiday. The marathon would show between six and twelve rebroadcasts of episodes, often with new material between the episodes from the cast and crew. While the show was on Sci-Fi, one Thanksgiving Day marathon of MST3K was held during its first season, but lacked any new interstitial material.

Following its acquisition of the series rights in 2013, Shout! Factory has streamed Turkey Day marathons on Thanksgiving, broadcasting multiple MST3K episodes and wrapped with introductions from Hodgson alongside other cast members at times. The event was intended to be a one-off, but the fans' reaction to it led Hodgson and Shout! to continue the tradition in subsequent years, continuing to be shown through 2024.

The 2015 Turkey Day coincided with the Kickstarter for the show's revival, while the 2016 Turkey Day includes the revival's new host Ray co-hosting alongside Hodgson. The 2017 Turkey Day was hosted by Hodgson, Ray and Felicia Day, and concluded with a surprise announcement that the show had been renewed on Netflix for another season.

=== Home media ===
Home video releases of MST3K episodes are complicated by the licensing rights of the featured film and any shorts, and as such many of the nationally televised episodes have not yet been released onto home video. Through the current distributor, Shout! Factory, over 100 of the films have been cleared for home media distribution. With Shout's release of the 39th volume of MST3K episodes in 2017, the company anticipated that only about a dozen episodes out of 197 from the original series' run will never make it to home video due to licensing rights issues of the movies featured.

Original home media releases were issued by Rhino Entertainment, initially starting with single disc releases before switching to semi-regular four-episode volume sets. According to Hodgson, the people at Rhino who were involved in the distribution of MST3K eventually left Rhino and joined Shout!, helping to convince that publisher to acquire the rights from Rhino. Since 2008, all releases of MST3K have been through Shout! (including some reprints of the first Rhino volume set) and have typically been multi-episode volumes or themed packs.

In 2014, 80 episodes of the show were made available for purchase or rental on the video streaming site Vimeo. Shout! has uploaded some episodes to YouTube with annotations, as documented by The Annotated MST fansite, to explain some of the sources of the jokes in the riffs. In February 2015, Shout! launched its own streaming service, Shout! Factory TV, of which selected episodes of MST3K were included on the service. Selected episodes were also made available on demand through RiffTrax starting in November 2015. Twenty episodes from previous MST3K seasons were released by Netflix in all regions in anticipation of the revival series.

All episodes of Season 11 were released on a DVD/Blu-ray box set on April 17, 2018, which includes a documentary behind the making of the first revival season.

== Adaptations ==
=== Syndication ===
In 1993, the show's staff selected 30 episodes to split into 60 one-hour segments for The Mystery Science Theater Hour. The repackaged series' first-run airings of these half-shows ran from November 1993 to July 1994. Reruns continued through December 1994, and it was syndicated to local stations from September 1995 to September 1996, allowing stations to run the series in a one-hour slot, or the original two hour version. MST3K returned to television for the first time in ten years in July 2014, when RetroTV began broadcasting the series on Saturday nights, with an encore on Sunday evenings. The following year, they started showing on PBS member stations. In the summer of 2016, Sinclair Broadcast Group and MGM's joint venture sci-fi network Comet picked up the series for a weekly Sunday night double-run; by coincidence, Sinclair's CW station in the Twin Cities, WUCW, which had originated the series when it was KTMA-TV, carries Comet on their second subchannel, returning the series to its original home for the first time in 27 years. The show premiered on IFC on January 7, 2020. It also airs on Z Living.

=== Feature film ===
In 1996, Universal Pictures under the Gramercy Pictures Label released Mystery Science Theater 3000: The Movie, a film adaptation in which Mike and the bots riffed This Island Earth. The film was released on DVD in the United States by Image Entertainment. Universal re-released the film on DVD on May 6, 2008, with a new anamorphic widescreen transfer, Dolby Digital 5.1 Surround Sound mix and the film's original trailer.

=== Print ===
In 1996, the book, The Amazing Colossal Episode Guide (written by many of the cast members), was released, which contained a synopsis for every episode from seasons one through six, and even included some behind-the-scenes stories as well. In it, Murphy related two tales about celebrity reactions he encountered. In one, the cast went to a taping of Dennis Miller's eponymous show; when they were brought backstage to meet Miller, the comedian proceeded to criticize the MST3K cast for their choice of movie to mock in the then-recent episode "Space Travelers" (a re-branded version of the Oscar-winning film Marooned). Murphy also discussed how he met Kurt Vonnegut, one of his literary heroes. When he had mentioned the show and its premise to Vonnegut, the author suggested that even people who work hard on bad films deserve some respect. Murphy then invited Vonnegut to dine with his group, which Vonnegut declined, claiming that he had other plans. When Murphy and friends ate later that night, he saw Vonnegut dining alone in the same restaurant, and remarked that he had been "faced...but nicely faced" by one of his literary heroes.

Dark Horse Comics announced on February 16, 2017, that it had planned a MST3K comic book series that was set for initial release in 2017. In June 2018, Dark Horse affirmed that the six-issue series would launch in September 2018, and would feature Jonah and the bots riffing on public domain comic books. The first comic was released on September 12, 2018, and it focuses on Jonah and the Bots trying to get out of comics while trying to save Crow when he starts to become a monster in the pages of Horrific. Hodgson oversaw the writing.

=== Live shows ===
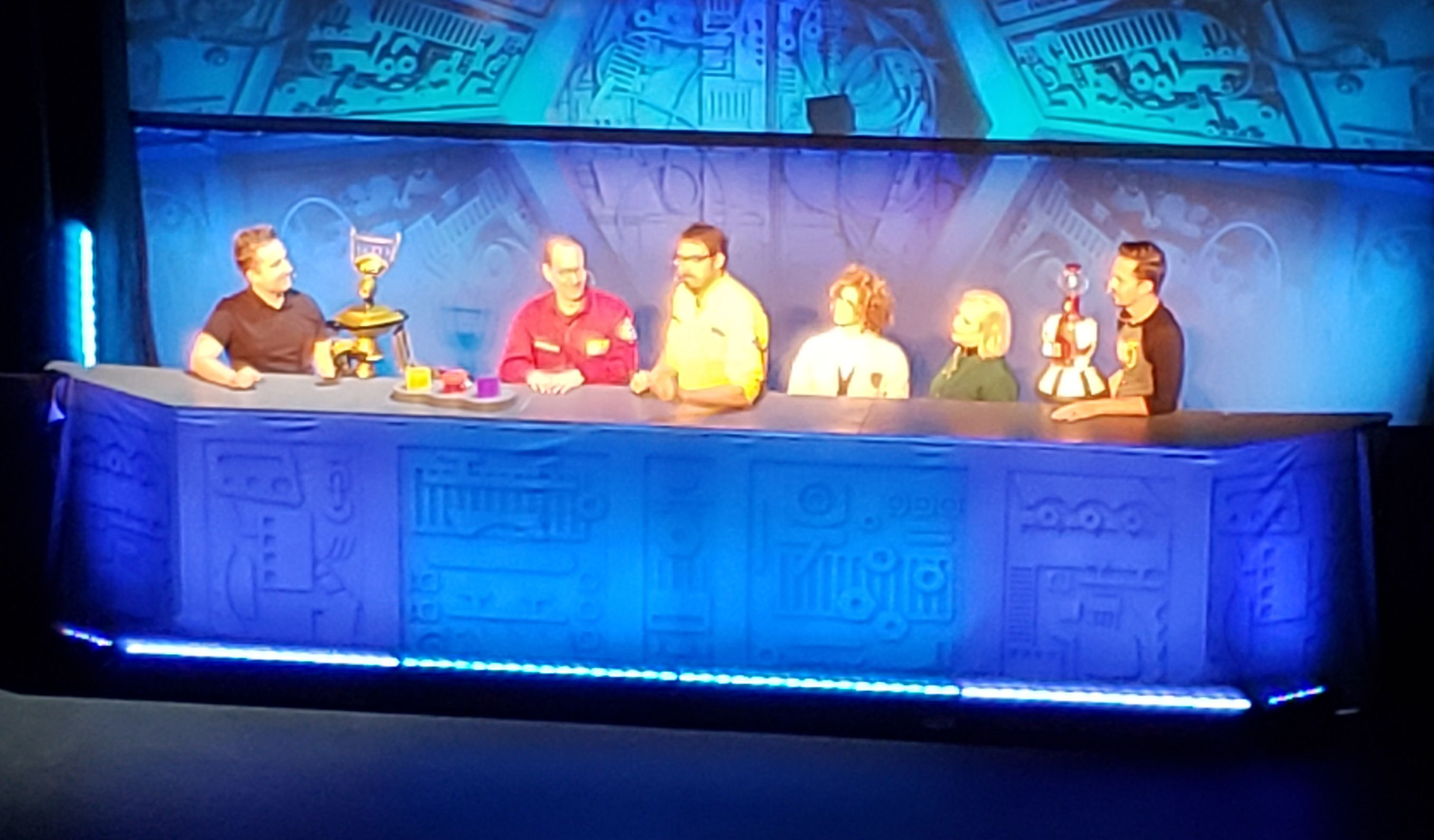
The cast of the 30th Anniversary Live Tour, from left: Grant Baciocco (controlling Crow T. Robot), Joel Hodgson, Jonah Ray, Deanna Rooney, Rebecca Hanson, and Tim Ryder (controlling Tom Servo)

The first MST3K live event was held on June 5 and 6, 1989 at the Comedy Gallery in Minneapolis. Jim Mallon served as the emcee of the event that featured stand-up sets by Joel, Josh Weinstein, and Trace Beaulieu. A Q&A session about the show was conducted, and the show's original pilot was shown. The robots and various props were on display for attendees to see.

The first live riffing event, called MST Alive! was held at the Uptown Theater in Minneapolis on July 11, 1992. There were two showings, both with live riffing of the feature film World Without End, as well as sing-alongs of different songs from the show, followed by a Q&A session. The event was hosted, in character, by Dr. Forrester, TV's Frank, Joel, and the Bots. A second version of "MST Alive!" was presented as a part of the first ever MST3K "ConventioCon ExpoFest-A-Rama" in 1994. In this show, Forrester and Frank forced Mike and the bots to watch This Island Earth, a film which was later riffed as a part of Mystery Science Theater 3000: The Movie.

Hodgson and the team for the 2017 revival announced an MST3K "Watch Out For Snakes Tour" during mid-2017 covering 29 cities in the United States and Canada. Jonah and the Bots riff on one of two films live for audiences, either Eegah (which had already been featured on the original run of MST3K, and which popularized the riff "Watch out for snakes", but featured new riffs for this tour) or an unannounced surprise film: Argoman the Fantastic Superman. The tour featured Ray, Yount and Hanson reprising their roles as Jonah Heston, Crow and Gypsy/Synthia. Vaughn was unavailable to perform Servo due to the birth of his child and the role was covered by Tim Ryder. The tour also featured Grant Baciocco as Terry the Bonehead, pre-recorded appearances from Day and Oswalt as Kinga and Max, and a live introduction from Hodgson.

Hodgson and Ray also toured in late 2018 as part of a 30th anniversary of MST3K in a similar format to the 2017 tour. Hodgson reprised the role of Joel Robinson and riffed movies alongside Ray and the bots during these shows. Ryder continued to perform Tom Servo, while Grant Baciocco, the lead puppeteer, voiced Crow. Rebecca Hanson also joined in her role as Synthia as the host of the show. Movies riffed at these shows included The Brain and Deathstalker II. During the tour, Hodgson announced that Deanna Rooney would be joining the cast in the twelfth season as a new "Mad" working with Kinga and Max.

The 2019 live tour, The Great Cheesy Movie Circus Tour, was promoted as Hodgson's "final live tour". Most of the tour dates featured the film No Retreat, No Surrender, while a few showed Circus of Horrors. The tour was promoted with video production updates and on-the-road updates via the tour's official website. In addition to Joel, the parts of Crow and Servo were portrayed by Nate Begle and Conor McGiffin respectively. Yvonne Freese played the parts of Gypsy and Mega-Synthia, a clone of both Pearl Forrester and the original Synthia. Emily Marsh also featured in the tour as the new character Crenshaw.

The Time Bubble Tour started on November 2, 2021, in Cleveland, OH with Emily Marsh, Yvonne Freese, Nate Begle and Conor McGiffin reprising their parts from the 2019 tour. Kelsey Brady joined the cast as Swing Puppeteer. The film was Roland Emmerich's Making Contact (1985).

=== Other appearances ===
In 1996, during promotion for the film, Nelson and the bots were interviewed in-character on MTV, and seen in silhouettes heckling footage from MTV News featuring the band Radiohead. Also that year, Hodgson was a featured guest on Cartoon Network's Space Ghost Coast to Coast.

In 1997, the videogame magazine PlayStation Underground (Volume 2, Number 1) included a Best Brains-produced MST3K short on one of their promotional discs. The video opened with a host segment of Mike and the Bots playing some PlayStation games, only to go into the theater to riff on some videos from the magazine's past. The feature is about seven minutes long. An Easter egg on the disc has some behind-the-scenes footage of Best Brains filming the sequences.

Nelson and the robot characters appeared in silhouette on an episode of Cheap Seats, a TV series in which the Sklar Brothers commented on clips of sporting events in a manner similar to MST3K.

In May 2020, Hodgson announced a special Mystery Science Theater 3000 Live Riff-Along with a planned date of May 3; the show featured Hodgson along with Emily Marsh, Conor McGiffin, Nate Begle, and Yvonne Freese, who had joined him during the 2019 MST3K live tour riffing atop the MST3K season one episode featuring Moon Zero Two and then riffing to a new short "Circus Days". In another charitable event, Hodgson, alongside Weinstein and Corbett reprising their voice roles as Tom Servo and Crow, riffed two new shorts as part of a crowdfunded effort to support MIGIZI, a Native American youth non-profit group whose headquarters were destroyed during the George Floyd protests in May 2020.

== Reception and legacy ==
In 2004, the show was listed as number 11 in a featured TV Guide article, "25 Top Cult Shows Ever!", and included a sidebar which read, "Mike Nelson, writer and star (replacing creator Joel Hodgson), recently addressed a college audience: 'There was nobody over the age of 25. I had to ask, "Where are you seeing this show?" I guess we have some sort of timeless quality.'" Three years later, TV Guide rewrote the article, and bumped MST3K to #13. In 2007, the show was listed as one of Time magazine's "100 Best TV Shows of All-Time" (it was also chosen as one of the magazine's top 10 shows of 1990). In 2012, the show was listed as #3 in Entertainment Weekly's "25 Best Cult TV Shows from the Past 25 Years", with the comment that "MST3K taught us that snarky commentary can be way more entertaining than the actual media."

The 2017 relaunch was met with critical acclaim; as of 2025, the first revival season has a 100% rating on Rotten Tomatoes.

=== Reactions by those parodied ===
The reactions of those parodied by MST3K have been mixed. Some notable negative reactions include producer Sandy Frank, who held the rights to several Gamera films parodied on the show. He said he was "intensely displeased" by the mockery directed at him (such as calling Frank "the source of all our pain" and implying that he was too lazy to make his own films.) Because of this, Frank reportedly refused to allow the shows to be rebroadcast once MST3K's rights ran out. However, this may in fact be a rumor, as other rumors indicate that the Gamera films' distribution rights prices were increased beyond what Best Brains could afford as a result of the show's success. According to Shout! Factory, the Japanese movie studio Kadokawa Pictures were so horrified with MST3K's treatment of five Gamera films that they refused to let Shout release the episodes on home video. Brian Ward (one of the members of Shout! Factory) explained to fans on the forums of the official Shout! Factory website that they tried their best to convince them, but "the Japanese take their Gamera films very seriously and do not appreciate them being mocked". However, eventually Shout was able to clear the episodes for a special 2011 release due to the rights in North America shifting away from the Japanese to another North American entity that had no such qualms.

Kevin Murphy has said that Joe Don Baker wanted to "beat up" the writers of the show for the relentless riffing Baker received during Mitchell. Murphy later stated that Baker probably meant it in a joking manner, although Mike Nelson has said that he had deliberately avoided encountering Baker while the two happened to be staying at the same hotel. Jeff Lieberman, director of Squirm, was also quite angry at the MST3K treatment of his film.

Director Rick Sloane was shocked at his treatment at the conclusion of Hobgoblins, in which Sloane himself was mercilessly mocked over the film's end credits. In a 2008 interview, however, Sloane clarified his comments, saying that "I laughed through the entire MST3K episode, until the very end. I wasn't expecting the humor to suddenly be at my own expense. I was mortified when they dragged out the cardboard cutout and pretended to do an interview with me. I was caught off guard. I had never seen them rip apart any other director before on the show." However, he credits the success of the MST3K episode with inspiring him to make a sequel to Hobgoblins, released in 2009.

Others, however, have been more positive: Robert Fiveson and Myrl Schriebman, producers of Parts: The Clonus Horror, said they were "flattered" to see the film appear on MST3K. Actor Miles O'Keeffe, the star of the film Cave Dwellers, called Best Brains and personally requested a copy of the MST3K treatment of the film, saying he enjoyed their skewering of what he had considered to be a surreal experience; according to Hodgson, O'Keeffe said his friends always heckled his performance in the film when it was on, and he appreciated the MST3K treatment. In the form of an essay and E. E. Cummings-esque poem, Mike Nelson paid tribute to O'Keeffe with a humorous mix of adulation and fear.

Rex Reason, star of This Island Earth, made appearances at several MST3K events and credits MST3K with introducing the film to a new generation. The crew of Time Chasers held a party the night the MST3K treatment of their film aired and, while reactions were mixed, director David Giancola said, "Most of us were fans and knew what to expect and we roared with laughter and drank way too much. I had a blast, never laughed so hard in my life."

Actor Adam West, star of the 1960s Batman TV series, co-starred in Zombie Nightmare, another film MST3K mocked. West apparently held no grudges, as he hosted the 1994 "Turkey Day" marathon in which the episode featuring Zombie Nightmare had its broadcast premiere. Mamie Van Doren (who appeared in Untamed Youth and Girls Town), Robert Vaughn (star of Teenage Cave Man, which he called the worst movie ever made) and Beverly Garland (who had appeared in three MST3K-featured Roger Corman films) also appeared during the marathon to introduce the episodes featuring their films.

=== Awards ===
In 1993, MST3K won a Peabody Award for "producing an ingenious eclectic series": "With references to everything from Proust to Gilligan's Island, Mystery Science Theater 3000 fuses superb, clever writing with wonderfully terrible B-grade movies". In 1994 and 1995, the show was nominated for the Primetime Emmy Award for Outstanding Individual Achievement in Writing for a Variety or Music Program, but lost both times to Dennis Miller Live. Every year from 1992 to 1997, it was also nominated for CableACE Awards. Its DVD releases have been nominated for Saturn Awards in 2004, 2006, 2007, and 2018.

The revival's first season was nominated for a Best Presentation on Television Saturn Award and an OFTA Television Award nod for Best Variety Program.

=== Influence ===
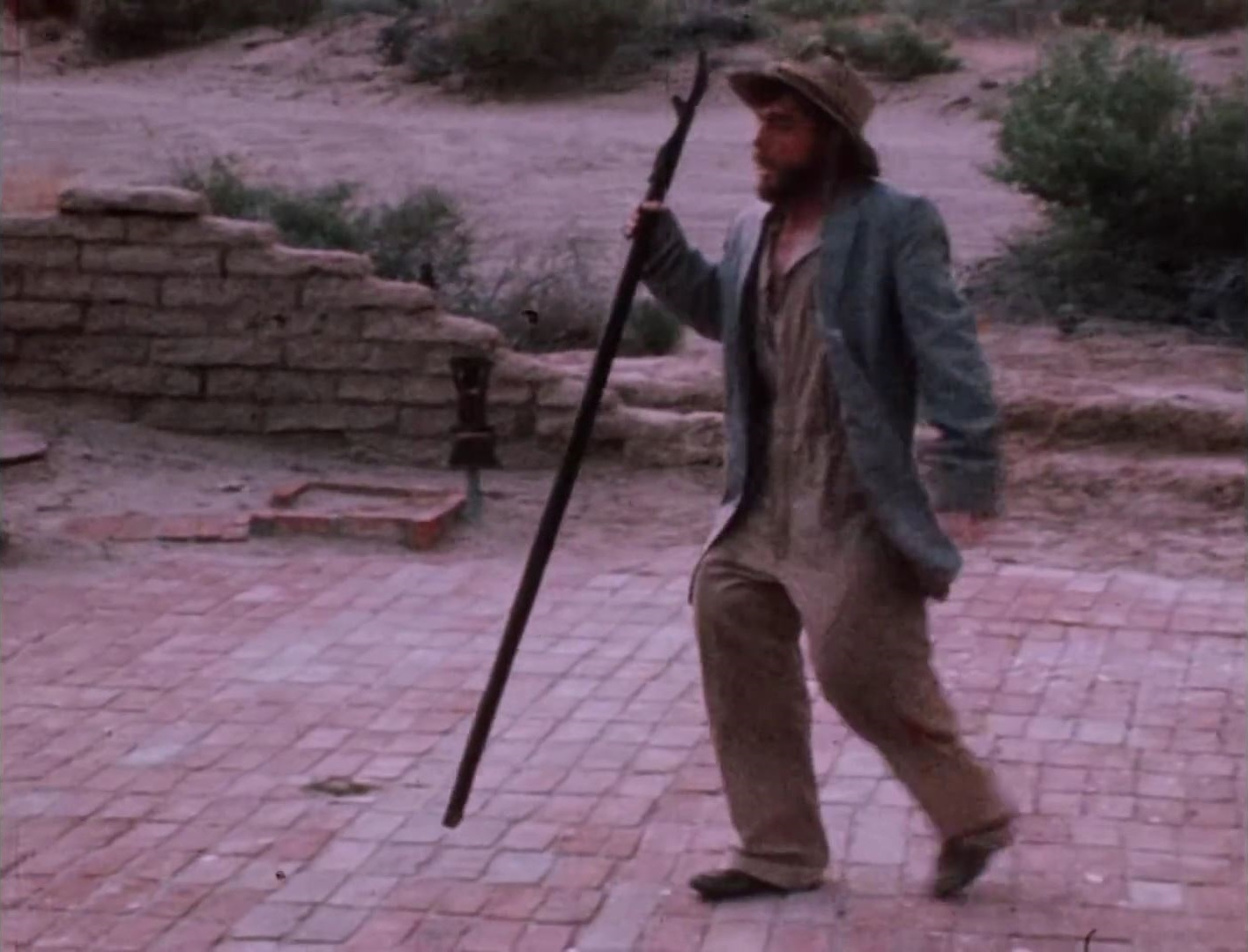
A frame from Manos: The Hands of Fate, featuring the satyr-like character Torgo. Manos was brought out of obscurity by MST3K, and MST3K would incorporate Torgo in several skits (typically played by Nelson).

Through MST3K, many obscure films have been more visible to the public, and several have since been considered some of the worst films ever made and are voted into the Bottom 100 on the Internet Movie Database. Of note is Manos: The Hands of Fate, which was riffed on by MST3K in its fourth season. Manos was a very low-budget film produced by Hal Warren, a fertilizer salesman at the time, taking on a dare from a screenwriter friend to show that anyone could make a horror film. The film suffered from numerous production issues due to its limited filming equipment, and many critics describe the result using a riff from MST3K, in that "every frame of this movie looks like someone's last-known photograph". The MST3K episode featuring Manos was considered one of its most popular and best episodes, and brought Manos into the public light as one of the worst films ever produced. The film gained a cult following, and an effort was made to restore the film to high-definition quality from its original film reels. MST3K also riffed on three films directed by Coleman Francis: Red Zone Cuba, The Skydivers, and The Beast of Yucca Flats, which brought awareness of Francis' poor direction and low-budget films, similar to that of Ed Wood. MST3K also brought to the limelight lackluster works by Bert I. Gordon, primarily giant monster B-movies, that gained attention through the show, and many Japanese kaiju movies imported and dubbed through producer Sandy Frank (jokingly referred to as "the source of all our pain"), particularly those in the Gamera series.

MST3K's riffing style to poke fun at bad movies, films, and TV shows, have been used in other works. In 2003, the television series Deadly Cinema, starring Jami Deadly, debuted, which featured the cast making fun of bad movies, MST3K-style. In 2004, the ESPN Classic series Cheap Seats, debuted, which featured two brothers making fun of clips of old sporting events, MST3K-style, and is noteworthy for containing an episode in which Mike, Crow, and Tom Servo briefly appeared in a cameo to make fun of the hosts' own skits. In 2008, the internet and direct-to-DVD comedy series Incognito Cinema Warriors XP, debuted, which used the same "host segment-movie segment" format the show established, while featuring completely original characters and plot. ICWXP gained a similar cult following, even earning the praises of former MST3K host Michael J. Nelson. In 2010, the television series This Movie Sucks! (and its predecessor Ed's Nite In), starring Ed the Sock and co-hosts Liana K and Ron Sparks, debuted. It features the cast making fun of bad movies. Creator Steven Kerzner, however, was quick to point out that MST3K was not "the creator of this kind of format, they're just the most recent and most well-known". In 2011, the theater silhouette motif was parodied by golf commentator and talk show host David Feherty in an episode of Feherty. He is shown sitting in front of a large screen and "riffing" while viewing footage of golfer Johnny Miller and is joined in the theater by his stuffed rooster (Frank) and his gnome statue (Costas).

Further, the riffing style from MST3K is considered part of the influence for DVD commentaries and successful YouTube reviewers and Let's Play-style commentators. DVD releases for both Ghostbusters and Men in Black used a similar format to Shadowrama for an "in-vision" commentary features. The concept of social television, where social media is integrated into the television viewing experience, was significantly influenced by MST3K. This social media practice of live-tweeting riffs and jokes on broadcast shows, such as for films like Sharknado, has its roots in MST3K. The MST3K approach has inspired Internet movie critics to create comedic movie reviews approaches, such as through RedLetterMedia and Screen Junkies which are considered more than just snarking on the movie but aim to help the viewer understand film and story techniques and their flawed use in poorly received films.

Public performances of live riffing have been hosted by various groups in different cities across the U.S. and Canada, including Cineprov (Atlanta, Georgia), Master Pancake Theater (Austin, TX), The Gentlemen Hecklers (Vancouver, BC Canada), Counterclockwise Comedy (Kansas City, Missouri), FilmRoasters (Richmond, Virginia), Moxie Skinny Theatre 3000 (Springfield, Missouri), Riff Raff Theatre (Iowa City, Iowa), Twisted Flicks (Seattle, Washington), and Turkey Shoot (Metro Cinema at the Garneau, Edmonton, Alberta, Canada).

The Center for Puppetry Arts crowdfunded and successfully acquired Tom Servo and Crow T. Robot in 2019.

=== Fandom ===
MST3K, broadcasting during the emergence of the Internet for public use, developed a large fan base during its initial broadcast; since the original broadcast, the show's fan base has continued to thrive. The show had already had its postal-based fan club, which people could write into and which some letters and drawings read on subsequent episodes, and the producers encouraged fans to share recordings of their episodes with others. At its peak, the "MST3K Fan Club" had over 50,000 members, and Best Brains were receiving over 500 letters each week. Fans of the show generally refer to themselves as "MSTies". Usenet newsgroups rec.arts.tv.mst3k.misc and rec.arts.tv.mst3k.announce were established in the mid-1990s for announcements and discussions related to the show. A type of fan fiction called MiSTings, in which fans would add humorous comments to other, typically bad, fan fiction works, was popular on these groups. The fan-run website Satellite News continues to track news and information about the show and related projects from its cast members. Another fan site, The Annotated MST, attempts to catalog and describe all the obscure popular culture references used in a given episode.

In addition to the show's fandom, a number of celebrities have expressed their love for the show. One of the earliest known celebrity fans was Frank Zappa, who went so far as to telephone Best Brains, calling MST3K as "the funniest fucking thing on TV" (according to Beaulieu). Zappa became a friend of the show, and following his death, episode 523 was dedicated to him. Other known celebrity fans include Al Gore, Neil Patrick Harris, Penn Jillette, and Patton Oswalt (who would later become TV's Son of TV's Frank in the revival).

Filmmaker Jordan Vogt-Roberts (Kong: Skull Island) also praised MST3K:

"Mystery Science Theater built something artful, endearing and comedic on top of the foundation other people's work. It had merit to itself."

There were two official fan conventions in Minneapolis (run by the series' production company Best Brains) called "ConventioCon ExpoFest-A-Rama" (1994) and "ConventioCon ExpoFest-A-Rama 2: Electric Boogaloo" (1996). At least 2,500 people attended the first convention.

== Related post-show projects ==
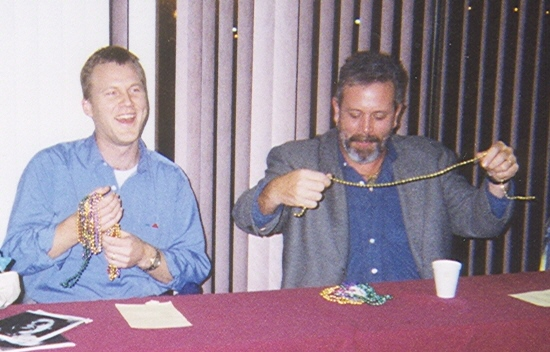
Mystery Science Theater 3000's Mike Nelson (left) and Kevin Murphy, at "Exoticon 1" convention panel in Metairie, Louisiana, November 1998

The various cast and crew from the show's broadcast run have continued to produce comedy works following the show. Two separate projects were launched that specifically borrowed on the theme of riffing on bad movies. After the short-lived The Film Crew in 2006, Nelson started RiffTrax, providing downloadable audio files containing MST3K-style riffs that the viewer can synchronize to their personal copy of a given popular movie (such as Star Wars: Episode I); this was done to avoid copyright and licensing issues with such films. RiffTrax's cast expanded to include Murphy and Corbett along with occasional guest stars, and are able to use a wider range of films, including films and shorts in the public domain, and films for which they could get the license to distribute digitally and, sometimes, on DVD/Blu-ray. In addition, they launched production of RiffTrax Live shows for various films, where they perform their riffing in front of a live audience that is simultaneously broadcast to other movie theaters across the country and later made available as on-demand video. As of 2023, RiffTrax continues to offer new material and shows. As part of a tribute to their roots, RiffTrax has performed some works that previously appeared on MST3K, including Manos: the Hands of Fate, Santa Claus, and Time Chasers.

Similarly, Hodgson, after some experimental creative works such as The TV Wheel, started Cinematic Titanic with Beaulieu, Weinstein, Conniff, and Pehl in 2007. Like MST3K, the five riffed on movies for which they were able to acquire the licenses (including Santa Claus Conquers the Martians), which then were distributed on DVD and, later, through on-demand video and streaming options. They later did a number of live shows across the United States, most of which were made available on DVD and digitally.

In 2015, Trace Beaulieu and Frank Conniff began performing together as "The Mads", riffing movies at live screenings across the U.S. Many of their stops included two nights of movies with a separate riff writing class the morning of the second film. Beginning in 2020, the Mads ceased in-person performances due to the COVID-19 pandemic, shifting, instead, to a livestream format for the shows, with digital downloads available afterwards.

Other related projects by the MST3K crew following the show's end include:

In 2000, most of the cast of the Sci-Fi era of the show collaborated on a humor website, Timmy Big Hands, that closed in 2001.

In 2001, Mike Nelson, Patrick Brantseg, Bill Corbett, Kevin Murphy and Paul Chaplin created The Adventures of Edward the Less, an animated parody of J. R. R. Tolkien's The Lord of the Rings and others in the fantasy genre, with additional vocals by Mary Jo Pehl and Mike Dodge, for the Sci Fi Channel website.

In 2008, Bill Corbett and fellow writer Rob Greenberg wrote the screenplay for Meet Dave, a family comedy starring Eddie Murphy about a tiny Star Trek-like crew operating a spaceship that looks like a man. The captain of the crew and the spaceship were both played by Murphy. Originally conceived as a series called Starship Dave for SciFi.com, it was dropped in favor of Edward the Less. The script (along with the title) were changed drastically by studio executives and other writers, although Corbett and Greenberg received sole screenwriter credit.

In 2010, Trace Beaulieu, Frank Conniff, Joel Hodgson, Mary Jo Pehl, Josh Weinstein, Beth McKeever and Clive Robertson voiced characters for Darkstar: The Interactive Movie, a computer game created by J. Allen Williams.

In 2013, Frank Conniff and animation historian Jerry Beck debuted Cartoon Dump, a series of classically bad cartoons, which are also occasionally performed live.

Trace Beaulieu and Joel Hodgson were featured in the Yahoo! Screen series Other Space in 2015, with Beaulieu voicing a robot companion of Hodgson's character, a burned-out spaceship engineer. Series creator Paul Feig, a fan of Mystery Science Theater 3000, said that he envisioned Hodgson and Beaulieu as their respective characters while writing them.

=== Reunions ===
In 2008, to commemorate the show's 20th anniversary, the principal cast and writers from all eras of the show reunited for a panel discussion at San Diego Comic-Con, which was hosted by actor-comedian Patton Oswalt (who would later go on to star in the revived series). The event was recorded and included as a bonus feature on the 20th Anniversary DVD release via Shout! Factory. Also that year, original MST3K cast members Joel Hodgson, Trace Beaulieu and Frank Conniff reunited to shoot a brief sketch to be included on the DVD release of The Giant Gila Monster. The new disc was added to Volume 10 of the "MST3K Collection" DVD boxed set series, replacing the Godzilla vs. Megalon disc which could no longer be sold due to licensing conflicts. The new package was sold under the name "Volume 10.2", and the sketch was presented as a seminar to instruct consumers on how to "upgrade" their DVD set, which merely consists of "disposing" of the old disc and inserting the new one.

In 2013, Joel Hodgson and Trace Beaulieu reprised their roles as Joel Robinson and Crow T. Robot for cameo appearances in the fourth season of Arrested Development.

As part of its live show events for 2016, RiffTrax presented a MST3K reunion at a live show in Minneapolis in June 2016. Hodgson, Bridget Nelson, Pehl, Conniff, and Beaulieu all joined the three regulars along with Jonah Ray from the revived series. The gathered cast riffed on a variety of shorts as part of the event.

== In popular culture ==
- Futurama featured silhouetted robots resembling Crow and Servo in the season 2 episode "Raging Bender".
- The poster for the 1996 film can be seen in the 2005 comedy The 40-Year-Old Virgin and the 2017 horror comedy Happy Death Day.
- In the 2004 direct-to-video Disney film The Lion King 1½, Timon and Pumbaa are shown in silhouette commenting on the movie shown before them, in a style similar to that of the show. Roger Allers, co-director of the original 1994 film, suggested this format.

== See also ==
- Cheap Seats
- The Cinema Snob – also influenced by MST3K
- List of films considered the worst
- Horror host
- Kitsch
- Camp (style)
- Cult film
- SchleFaZ
- RiffTrax
- Cinematic Titanic
