= The Sidehackers =

1969 film by Gus Trikonis

- Theatrical release poster
- Directed by: Gus Trikonis
- Written by: Larry Billman (story); Tony Huston
- Produced by: Ross Hagen
- Starring: Ross Hagen; Diane McBain; Michael Pataki
- Cinematography: Jon Hall; Mike Neyman
- Edited by: Pat Somerset
- Music by: Mike Curb; Guy Hemric; Jerry Styner
- Distributed by: Crown International Pictures
- Release date: May 1969
- Running time: 82 minutes
- Country: United States
- Language: English

The Sidehackers (also known as Five the Hard Way) is a 1969 American action film about motorcycle racing with a twist. Each motorcycle has a sidehack (a sidecar with a rail but no sidewalls or seat), in which a passenger rides and tilts to one side or the other when going around curves. The credits thank the "Southern California Sidehack Association"; sidehacking is also known as sidecarcross or "sidecar motocross racing".

== Plot ==
Rommel is a mechanic at a motorbike repair shop who works alongside his partner Luke, and competes in sidehack-style races. He and his fiancée Rita plan to get married soon. Rommel meets J. C., a hot-tempered entertainer, when he brings his bike in for repair. J. C. sees a sidehack bike in the shop and takes a liking to it. Rommel invites J. C. and his crew to join him in a sidehack event the upcoming weekend. At the event, J. C. enjoys watching Rommel race on the sidehack; J. C. later accepts a ride on a sidehack at a cabin Rommel shares with his girlfriend, Rita.

A day of racing on Rommel's sidehack is followed by a dinner party at the cabin. The party turns ugly when Rommel declines to join his J. C.'s gang. J. C. loses his temper when Dirty John (one of his henchmen) asks him a question and Nero (another henchman) tries to calm him. After J. C. again asks Rommel to join his gang, J. C.'s girlfriend, Paisley, reminds him that Rommel isn't interested. Infuriated by her comment, J. C. reluctantly accepts Rommel's rejection and everyone awkwardly walks out of the cabin.

Angry with Paisley, J. C. pressures her into answering why Rommel shouldn't join their crew. Paisley finds it humorous, and tells J. C. that she finds him disappointing. When she tries to leave, J. C. roughly pulls her back. J. C. tells her to scream for help; when she does, J. C. punches her in the stomach, and tells her she is his and no one else's.

The next day, while Rommel and Luke are working on a bike, Paisley comes over and tries to seduce Rommel, but he rejects her. When J. C. and his men return to their hotel, they find a drunk and disheveled Paisley, who claims that Rommel raped her. Angered, J. C. and his gang find Rommel and Rita in their cabin making love. The gang beat Rommel unconscious, then rape Rita, killing her in the process. Luke finds Rommel and Rita, and calls the police. Now a wanted man, J. C. is forced into hiding.

Despite Luke's warnings to let the police handle the situation, Rommel is determined get revenge. Rommel gathers a hit squad that consists of J. C.'s former henchmen Nero, muscle-bound Big Jake, bailed-out criminal Crapout, and Cooch (who is a double agent for J. C.). With help from Cooch, Rommel and his gang head out into the canyons where J. C. is known to be hiding; Luke goes after Rommel to stop him. Rommel's plan involves engaging J. C. and his gang in hand-to-hand combat. Suspecting J. C.'s gang may be armed, Rommel's gang reluctantly agrees to the plan.

The next morning, Cooch sneaks over to J. C.'s hideout and advises him on Rommel's plan. After Cooch leaves, J. C. celebrates his victory with Paisley, thinking his victory over Rommel is all but certain. Paisley breaks up with J. C. because of his abuse as well as her guilt for indirectly causing Rita's death. An enraged J. C. strangles Paisley to death, and then apologizes to her corpse, chiding her for making him so angry.

Luke tries to talk Rommel out of his retribution, telling Rommel that he is no better than J. C. if he follows through; Rommel ignores Luke's pleas. Rommel's gang catches Cooch returning from J. C.'s camp. After the gang savagely beats him, Cooch reveals that J. C. can be found in a rock quarry in the canyons. Finally realizing revenge is worthless, Rommel asks Luke to tell the police where J. C. is hiding. Rommel's men attack J. C. in his hideout. Big Jake is shot and killed after taking down two of J. C.'s men. Cooch manages to escape and runs to J. C., who kills him for his betrayal. Nero and Crapout escape on a bike as the latter shoots the rest of J. C.'s men.

Rommel and J. C. find each other in the quarry and fight. Rommel manages to gain the upper hand, but when the police arrive he decides to walk away. J. C. finds a gun dropped by one of his dead henchmen and shoots Rommel in the back. The film concludes with a flashback of Rommel and Rita rolling about in a grassy field, superimposed over a shot of Rommel's dead body.

== Cast ==
- Ross Hagen as Vince Rommel
- Diane McBain as Rita
- Michael Pataki as J. C.
- Richard Merrifield as Luke
- Claire Polan as Paisley
- Edward Parrish as Nero
- Michael Graham as Cooch
- Hoke Howell as Crapout
- Robert Tessier as Big Jake
- Eric Lidberg as Tork
- Erik Cord as Dirty John
- Toni Moss as Lois
- Diane Tessier as Debbie
- Joey Tessier as Billy
- Goldie Hawn as spectator (uncredited)

== Mystery Science Theater 3000 ==
On September 29, 1990, The Sidehackers was featured on Mystery Science Theater 3000 (MST3K) in episode #202. It includes one of the few occasions Cambot actually interacts with the experiment other than simply filming it; in this case, the bot places an ESPN-like score graphic during the movie's racing sequences.

The episode was released on DVD by Rhino Entertainment as part of the third volume of the Mystery Science Theater 3000 DVD box sets. The four-disc collection was later reissued by Shout Factory in September 2016.

=== Edits ===
The MST3K writers were initially unaware of the film's darker content when they selected it for the show, only having watched the entirety of the film during the writing process. They were horrified to discover the scene in which Rommel's girlfriend Rita is raped and killed, juxtaposed with shots of Luke and Lois' children playfully roughhousing. This scene, and the discovery of Rita's nearly nude body, were removed from the episode. To make up for the missing plot elements, the character of Crow interposes, "For those of you playing along at home, Rita is dead." According to the series' head writer (and future host) Michael J. Nelson, "We were all traumatized, the scene got cut, and from that day forward, movies were watched in their entirety (for such potentially offensive content) before they were selected."

== Soundtrack ==
The movie's soundtrack LP was issued in 1969 in the U.S. by Amaret Records (ST 5004) with the following tracks:

1. "5 the Hard Way"
2. "Love Theme (Only Love)" (instrumental)
3. "Strollin' Sunday Mornin'"
4. "5 the Hard Way" (instrumental)
5. "Ha Lese (Le Di Khanna)"
6. "Only Love" (instrumental)
7. "Sidehacker"
8. "Psychedelic Rape"
9. "I Wanna Cry"
10. "5 the Hard Way" (reprise instrumental)
11. "Only Love"

The music was composed by Mike Curb and Jerry Styner, with lyrics by Guy Henric, and performed by the psychedelic West Coast rock band The New Life.

== See also ==
- List of American films of 1969
