= Mitchell (film) =

1975 film by Andrew V. McLaglen

- Theatrical release poster
- Directed by: Andrew V. McLaglen
- Written by: Ian Kennedy Martin
- Produced by: R. Ben Efraim
- Starring: Joe Don Baker; Linda Evans; Martin Balsam
- Cinematography: Harry Stradling Jr.
- Edited by: Fred A. Chulack
- Music by: Larry Brown; Jerry Styner
- Production company: Essex Enterprises Ltd.
- Distributed by: Allied Artists Pictures Corporation
- Release date: September 10, 1975
- Running time: 97 minutes
- Country: United States
- Language: English
- Budget: $1,162,500

Mitchell is a 1975 American crime action film directed by Andrew V. McLaglen, from a screenplay by Ian Kennedy Martin. Joe Don Baker stars as the titular character, an abrasive police detective. Very much an anti-hero, Mitchell often ignores the orders of his superiors and demonstrates disdain for by-the-book development work as well as normal social graces. The film also stars Martin Balsam, John Saxon, Linda Evans and Merlin Olsen.

The film was released in the United States on September 10, 1975 by Allied Artists Pictures Corporation. It had a negative critical reception and was a commercial disappointment. Years later, Mitchell had a resurgence after being featured in a season 5 episode of the comedy series Mystery Science Theater 3000 in 1993.

== Plot ==
In Los Angeles, trade union lawyer named Walter Deaney kills a burglar in his house. Only an unorthodox plainclothes detective named Mitchell believes that Deaney is guilty of something more than self-defense, but police chief Albert Pallin tells him that Deaney is wanted for "every federal law violation in the book" and is therefore "FBI property."

To keep Mitchell away from Deaney, the Chief orders him to stake out the home of James Arthur Cummins, a wealthy man with ties to the mob whose "big scene" is the import and export of stolen merchandise. Mitchell initially is unconcerned with Cummins and focuses primarily on Deaney. But he gets drawn in after Cummins discovers that Salvatore Mistretta, cousin of his mafioso benefactor Tony Gallano, is bringing in a shipment of stolen heroin from Mexico without Cummins' approval.

Meanwhile, a high-priced escort named Greta shows up at Mitchell's apartment. Mitchell allows her to come in, and after spending two nights with her and arresting her for possession of marijuana, he discovers that Deaney is paying her $1,000 per night to entertain Mitchell. After unsuccessfully trying to bribe Mitchell with Greta's services and an offer of an illicit real estate deal, Deaney decides to work with Cummins to eliminate the annoying cop. Deaney and a henchman drive dune buggies and try to run down Mitchell in a secluded area but each are taken down by Mitchell, who kills one with a rock while Deaney is killed when the dune buggy goes out of control with Mitchell in pursuit.

Cummins refuses to let Mistretta use his port facilities to bring in the shipment, causing Gallano to send thugs to harass him. Cummins decides that the only ally he still has—aside from his faithful butler and bodyguard, Benton—is Mitchell, because he's no good to the police dead. In exchange for his own freedom, Cummins offers to allow Mitchell to pose as a chauffeur and pick up the shipment, putting him in a position to both confiscate the drugs and arrest Mistretta. However, Cummins double-crosses Mitchell by alerting Mistretta to his real identity. He also double-crosses Mistretta by replacing the heroin with chalk. Mistretta decides to kill Mitchell and dump the body on Cummins' boat.

Mitchell soon triggers the car to explode and runs off from Mistretta and his men before a police helicopter arrives to drop a gun for Mitchell, who proceeds to kill Mistretta and his men, allowing Mitchell to go after Cummins, who is attempting to flee the country by sea. Mitchell is dropped onto the boat by helicopter and kills Benton with a gaff hook. Cummins is killed by Mitchell with an assault rifle after one final attempted double-cross fails.

Mitchell returns to his apartment to find Greta awaiting him. Mitchell brushes her off, pointing out that she is no longer being paid to keep him company. Despite this, Greta wishes to spend the night with Mitchell. However, he detects the scent of marijuana on her and Mitchell prepares to haul Greta off to jail for a second possession charge.

== Cast ==
- Joe Don Baker as Mitchell
- Martin Balsam as James Arthur Cummings
- John Saxon as Walter Deaney
- Linda Evans as Greta
- Merlin Olsen as Benton
- Morgan Paull as Salvatore Mistretta
- Harold J. Stone as Tony Gallano
- Robert Phillips as Chief Albert Pallin
- Buck Young as Det. Aldridge
- Rayford Barnes as Det. Tyzack
- Jerry Hardin as Desk Sergeant
- Sidney Clute as Rudy Moran
- Vicky Peters as Helena Jackman

== Production ==
The screenplay was written by British writer Ian Kennedy Martin, best known for creating the television series The Sweeney. The film was produced independently by Essex Enterprises, Ltd., a company created by producer R. Ben Efraim and former MGM executive Benjamin Melniker. Filming took place in Los Angeles between December 1974 and January 1975.

=== Music ===
The film's theme song was performed by country music singer Hoyt Axton.

== Critical reception ==
Mitchell was generally panned by critics upon its release. In The New York Times, Vincent Canby wrote:

Mitchell, starring Joe Don Baker as a hard-nosed Los Angeles detective named Mitchell, has a lot of over-explicit violence, some gratuitous sex stuff and some rough language, yet it looks like a movie that couldn't wait to get to prime-time television. Perhaps it's a pilot film for a TV series, or maybe it's just a movie that's bad in a style we associate with some of the more mindless small-screen entertainments.

Mitchell spends what seems to be the greater part of the film climbing in and out of automobiles, driving automobiles, chasing other automobiles, parking automobiles, and leaning against the body of automobiles that are temporarily at rest. Once he smashes a hoodlum's hand in the door of an automobile.

The climax, for a giddy change of pace, features a police helicopter in pursuit of a high-speed cabin cruiser. Automobiles sink when driven onto water.

Said the Time Out film guide:

Baker's the big lumpy cop who won't take no and another assignment for an answer when he's told to lay off the gun-happy lawyer (Saxon) he suspects of cold-blooded murder, and to concentrate on the businessman with the coke connection (Balsam). He realises that in such a sparsely-populated cheapie they just have to be in collusion, as he punches and shoots his way to the final credits accompanied by vocal encouragement from one of those country singers with terminal cancer. Balsam and Saxon contribute no more than their required quota of urbane sneers before being bulldozed into oblivion by the golem hero of this irredeemably routine potboiler.

== Television version ==
In 1980, a heavily-edited version of the 1975 film was released for broadcast television, in which most of the violence and all of the nudity and profanity were removed. Several scenes in the film were shot twice for this purpose:

- Greta writes on the windshield of Mitchell's car with lipstick. In the theatrical release the word written on the windshield is "BASTARD", while in the TV version the word is "JERK".
- In the police station, all sexual references to "lay" in the theatrical release are changed to "sleep with" in the TV version. Additionally, Greta calling Mitchell a "mean bastard" is changed to her sarcastically saying he is a "terrific human being".
- The exchange during the dinner scene between Cummins and Benton was also shot twice to substitute "goddamn awful butler" with "lousy butler".
- The scene with Mitchell arguing with a skateboarding boy was edited with Mitchell saying "Buzz off, kid!" in the TV version instead of "Piss off, kid!" in the theatrical release. His remark "Go to hell!" to the boy as he skateboards away was also censored.

== Mystery Science Theater 3000 episode ==
On October 23, 1993 on Comedy Central, the edited-for-television release of Mitchell was featured as episode #512 of Mystery Science Theater 3000. The film was trimmed by several minutes to match MST3K's format, resulting in a scene where Mitchell kills John Saxon's character during a dune buggy chase being cut, resulting in his character vanishing mid-film abruptly. The only mention of his disappearance was a voiceover by a radio announcer stating that Saxon's character had died. Tom Servo remarks on this lapse with the question, "Hey, guys, wasn't John Saxon in this movie?" Particularly mocked were Mitchell's alcoholism, slovenliness and uncouth behavior. During the opening credits, Servo and Crow mock the theme song by improvising lyrics about food and Mitchell's weight, briefly referencing the theme song from Shaft.

According to the Mystery Science Theater 3000 Amazing Colossal Episode Guide, the cast had heard a rumor that actor Joe Don Baker was very angry at the MST3K treatment of Mitchell, and threatened physical violence on any of the cast or crew, should he ever meet them in person. This did not stop them from later featuring (and happily mocking) another of Baker's films, Final Justice, and hurling even more vicious insults at Baker. Kevin Murphy, who played MST3K's robot Tom Servo and served as one of the show's writers, later said Baker likely meant it in a joking manner. Nevertheless, MST3K head writer and star Michael J. Nelson stated that he avoided running into Baker when he discovered that they were both staying at the same hotel.

The episode is also notable for its host segment's subplot involving Gypsy, who overhears the Mads plotting to kill their new temp, Mike, and mistakenly thinks they are planning to kill Joel. Working with Mike, Gypsy locates an escape pod and uses it to "save" Joel's life, ending his imprisonment on the Satellite of Love. The Mads then abandon their plan to kill Mike, and instead send him to the SoL to replace Joel.

Fans and critics consistently bill Mitchell as one of the series' best. The episode was chosen by fans to appear in the MST3K 2016 Turkey Day Marathon. The episode finished third in a poll of MST3K Season 11 Kickstarter backers. Writer Jim Vorel ranked the episode the eighth best (Note: Ranking based on 197 episodes as of 2018.) in his rankings of the show's first 12 seasons, writing, "Rarely has the character of a single actor been assassinated so thoroughly as Joe Don Baker is here" — although he also calls the title character "a bloating, wheezing, oily, ill-tempered cop who argues with children". Season 11 head writer Elliott Kalan selected Mitchell as his ninth-favorite MST3K episode, writing the episode is "a great example of an MST3K strength — using multiple, successive riffs to take one aspect of a film’s character and turn it into his or her defining trait." In an article for Vulture, writer Courney Enlow listed Mitchell as one of the series 25 most essential episodes.

The MST3K version of the film was released on VHS by Rhino Home Video on September 1, 1998 and was reissued on DVD in November 2001 with the theatrical trailer as an extra. Shout! Factory released the episode on DVD as part of the box set Mystery Science Theater 3000: The 25th Anniversary Edition on December 10, 2013. Mitchell shared a disc with The Brain That Wouldn't Die (episode #513). Other episodes included in the collection are Moon Zero Two (episode #111), The Day the Earth Froze (episode #422), The Leech Woman (episode #802), and Gorgo (episode #909).

== See also ==
- List of American films of 1975
