= GPC (Mystery Science Theater 3000) =

Fictional character in the American comedic film review series

Gypsy
- Mystery Science Theater 3000 character
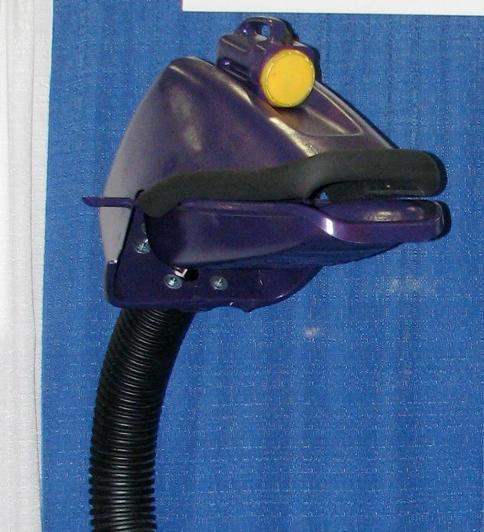
- Gypsy
- First appearance: K00 – The Green Slime
- Created by: Joel Hodgson
- Portrayed by: Josh Weinstein (KTMA season); Jim Mallon (season 1 – episode 813 – Jack Frost, Patrick Brantseg (episode 815 – Agent for H.A.R.M. – season 10); Rebecca Hanson (season 11 – present); Yvonne Freese (2019 Live Tour - Present)

In-universe information
- Species: Robot
- Gender: Female (male in the pilot episode and K01)

Gypsy, also known as Gypsum, GPC/GPC 1/GPC 2 , is one of the fictional robot characters on the television series Mystery Science Theater 3000. She is larger and less talkative than the other robots. Gypsy normally only appears during the show's host segments and introduction, but briefly took a seat in the theater to watch the movie in episode #412 (Hercules and the Captive Women). She only delivered a couple of "riffs" – partially because she took the movie and what the 'boys' were saying too literally, and left after realizing how bad the movie was. Along with the other robots, Gypsy was designed and built by series creator Joel Hodgson. She was named Gypsy after a pet turtle his brother once owned, as the robot's size and ponderousness reminded him of the turtle.

== Role ==
According to the MST3K storyline, Gypsy takes care of the higher functions on board the Satellite of Love. She needs to use most of her computing power to handle this responsibility, which generally makes her appear slow-witted when dealing with others. The episode #207: Wild Rebels briefly demonstrated a much brighter Gypsy when the demand on her systems was temporarily reduced. (She also made a quick appearance in the theater during this experiment when someone mentioned Voyage to the Bottom of the Sea, on account of her oft-stated fascination for the show's star, Richard Basehart).

As the series progressed, she became a more frequent participant in the host segments, and appeared more intelligent, even attempting to sit in on an experiment during one of the Hercules films, Hercules and the Captive Women. However, she left after a few minutes when she "realized there were these things" she had to go take care of. Gypsy is a big fan of Richard Basehart; her brain was once X-rayed, and found to contain RAM chips and a photo of Basehart. She is also a notary.

Gypsy played a key role in the series' overall plot in episode #512, Mitchell, when she overheard the Mads discussing killing Mike Nelson, who was currently working at Gizmonic Institute as a temp, and mistakenly believed they were plotting to kill Joel. Terrified, she worked to come up with a plan to help Joel escape. Talking with Mike over the viewscreen, they were able to locate an escape pod. At the end of the episode, Gypsy launched Joel off the Satellite of Love in the pod, marking Joel's departure as a regular character. The Mads then abandon their plan to kill Mike, and instead use him as the new human test subject. Mike became the regular host for the remainder of the series' original run.

In season six, the show introduced a device usually referred to as the Umbilicus, although, in some episodes, it was referred to as either the Umbilicon or the Umbiliport. The Umbilicus was a long tether that connected the Satellite of Love to the underground lair Deep 13, and allowed objects to be sent back and forth between Mike and the mad scientists who had stranded him in orbit. In its first appearance on the show, in episode #601: Girls Town, the Umbilicus was directly connected to Gypsy's snake-like body, with objects being sent or received through her mouth. The receiving station was later changed to an oven-like hatch on the bridge of the Satellite of Love.

Gypsy also developed an independent bohemian feminist side to her personality, beginning with the Creeping Terror episode during the Mad Scientist's "coffeehouse poseur" experiment, when she sang, "you, the middle-class white male, are my personal oppressor!" As the series progressed, she penned her own one-woman, cabaret show: "Gypsy Rose Me!" (a reference to burlesque performer Gypsy Rose Lee).

After the Satellite of Love crashed into the Earth in the final episode of the original run of MST3K (#1013: Diabolik), Gypsy is not present with Mike and the Bots in their shared apartment. Tom Servo is seen reviewing a "ConGypsCo Annual Report", and the guys reflect on their failure to have taken up new corporate mogul Gypsy on her public offering.

During KTMA episode #6, Gamera vs. Gaos, Joel claimed to have tried to program her voice to resemble Kim Carnes, but failed. In a sketch in episode #13, SST: Death Flight, GPC was uniquely voiced and operated by a woman (Faye Burkholder). In episode #409, The Indestructible Man, GPC swapped voices with Magic Voice in the opening host segment.

In the Season 1 premiere, Gypsy managed to uncoil herself, revealing that she was at least fifty feet long. Joel explained that he just kept making her longer and longer compulsively when he built her (comparing it to, "When you start connecting paper clips, you get hooked on it...").

Hodgson confirmed that Gypsy would appear in the 2017 revival series, where she is played by Rebecca Hanson, an alum of The Second City. Hodgson reworked how Gypsy would be constructed and interact with the Satellite crew as to correct some of the faults he found in her appearance in the original series; while she still operates the ship, the power of cloud computing allows this responsibility to be shared among all the 'bots, and she will be able to dedicate more of her computation cycles to participating in conversation, including appearing in some of the theater riffing. The new test subject host of the show, Jonah Heston, upgraded GPC with features that include her now traveling through the Satellite of Love via an overhead flyspace and speaking in a feminine Midwestern United States accent.

After the show's 2017 return, some viewers expressed concern that the term "gypsy" had become widely viewed as an ethnic slur against Romani and other itinerant peoples, and so made calls for her name to be changed. Hodgson eventually did change the character's name; as of 2019, she is called "GPC".

== Behind the scenes ==
Gypsy's head was built out of a "Century Infant Love Seat". Parts of an Eveready flashlight were used for her eye, the white rubber "hood" portion generally absent after the first couple of seasons. Foam tubing was used on her lips (usually a dull light gray), and her neck was made of a long black PVC hose. The head portion was painted a metallic purple, with a small amount of metallic blue on the inside of her mouth. Occasionally the tubing of her lips is colored red, giving the effect that she's wearing lipstick.

During the initial KTMA season a different children's car seat was used for the head portion, the entire puppet painted a copper color. Also during this season, her name was sometimes given as "Gypsum." This Gypsy, with small alterations, would later be used for Cambot during the opening of season one episodes.

During the KTMA season, Gypsy's voice and operation were handled by Josh Weinstein. From the first to eighth nationally telecast seasons, Gypsy was voiced and handled by Jim Mallon, who was one of the producers and writers on the show, who provided her with a high-pitched falsetto voice. Starting midway through season 8 in episode #815, Agent for H.A.R.M., the job of operating and voicing Gypsy was handed over to Patrick Brantseg, who also performed most of the puppetry during filming of Mystery Science Theater 3000: The Movie so as to allow Jim Mallon to focus on directing rather than working the puppet. Patrick Brantseg would handle the role for the remainder of the series.

In February 2017, it was confirmed that Gypsy would be renamed "GPC" and be a character on the new season. Joel Hodgson announced (via a message to the Kickstarter backers) that GPC would be voiced by Rebecca Hanson. The GPC puppet was operated by Tim Blaney.
