= The Night Shift (film) =

- Directed by: Thomas Smith
- Written by: Thomas Smith
- Based on: The Night Shift by Thomas Smith
- Produced by: Erin Lilley
- Starring: Khristian Fulmer; Erin Lilly; Soren Odom; Jordan Woodall
- Cinematography: Soren Odom
- Music by: Soren Odom
- Production company: Fighting Owl Films
- Distributed by: R Squared Films
- Release date: October 25, 2011
- Running time: 123 minutes
- Country: United States
- Language: English
- Budget: $10,000

The Night Shift is a 2011 American zombie comedy film directed and written by Thomas Smith. It stars Khristian Fulmer as a cemetery watchman who must contend with undead residents and paranormal occurrences.

== Plot ==
A night watchman at the local cemetery deals with zombies and other residents who refuse to be still. Along with his skeleton sidekick Herbie and boss Claire, he must confront a hostile takeover from a rival cemetery, a werewolf, and Adremalech, a powerful demon.

== Cast ==
- Khristian Fulmer as Rue Morgan
- Erin Lilley as Claire Rennfield
- Soren Odom as Herbie
- Jordan Woodall as Curly
- Jonathan Pruitt as Capt. Roderick Blake
- Don Bloom as Doc
- Andrew Crider as Adremalech
- Brendon Cooke as Wolfman

== Production ==
The film was shot in Mobile, Alabama from May to June 2010. Director Smith self-financed the film; the budget was approximately $10,000. Smith's influences include Steven Spielberg and 1950s-era B movies. It was based on a short film of the same name directed by Smith.

== Release ==
R Squared Films released The Night Shift on DVD on October 25, 2011.

== Reception ==
Mark L. Miller of Ain't It Cool News called it "charming and fun" and recommended it to fans of horror spoofs. Vance Garrett of Independent Film Reviews called it "a fun and engaging Sunday afternoon diversion that is more than suitable for family viewing."
