= Joel Robinson =

Fictional character in the American Mystery Science Theater 3000 television series

- Mystery Science Theater 3000 character
- Joel Robinson in a season 2 episode
- First appearance: K00 – The Green Slime
- Last appearance: 512 – Mitchell (original hosting run) 1312 - The Bubble
- Created by: Joel Hodgson
- Portrayed by: Joel Hodgson

In-universe information
- Species: Human
- Gender: Male
- Occupation: Manager at a Hot Fish Shop in Osseo, Minnesota, as of 1001 – Soultaker Former Pyrotechnician for "Man or Astro-man?"

Joel Robinson is a fictional character featured in the American science fiction comedy television series Mystery Science Theater 3000 (MST3K). He was portrayed by series creator Joel Hodgson. If counting the locally-produced episodes, Joel Robinson is the show's longest-tenured host with 107 episodes (86 if not counting the aforementioned episodes) on television. He also returned as an occasional host in the online Season 13.

== Overview ==
The show's theme song explains Joel's backstory: Formerly a janitor and inventor for Gizmonic Institute, Joel was launched into space by his boss Dr. Clayton Forrester and co-worker Dr. Laurence Erhardt – later replaced by TV's Frank – as part of an experiment to see which bad movies were capable of destroying the human mind. Joel built the 'Bots Tom Servo, Crow, Gypsy, and Cambot to keep him company, but in doing so used parts that apparently caused him to lose the ability to control when the films would stop and start. Though bombarded with many horrible films, he tends to take his captivity in benign stride, delivering most of his riffs in deadpan, holding no ill will against his captors and even affectionately calling them "the Mads" (among other amusing nicknames such as "the Overlords") while riffing on popular culture ("Auntie Em and Toto") or things found in Minnesota ("Milavetz and Associates", a prominent Twin Cities-area law firm).

As the opening theme song said, Joel generally wore a red jumpsuit during most of his time as host, but on occasion would wear other colors, such as tan (during the show's first improvisation season on KTMA) or green or bright aqua colored (often worn during Season 2). From season 2 episode 212 through his departure in episode 512, Joel wore a darker, maroon-colored jumpsuit, though the original red jumpsuit (and second season green one) remained in the show's intro and opening theme.

Joel was the host from 1988–93. Episode #512, Mitchell, was his final episode as host; beginning with the following episode (#513 The Brain That Wouldn't Die) he was replaced by Mike Nelson, played by series head writer Michael J. Nelson.

During Mitchell, Gypsy overheard The Mads talking about eliminating Mike, the temp worker who was assisting them with an "evil-scientist audit". Hearing them refer to Mike as a "be-jumpsuited fool" and thinking they were actually talking about Joel, she struggled to think of some way to help Joel escape his alleged fate. Joel escaped the Satellite of Love (SOL) in a previously undiscovered escape pod (named the Deus Ex Machina) mislabeled as a crate of "Hamdingers" that Mike told Gypsy about. Mike managed to override The Mads' control over the SOL so that Gypsy could get Joel into the escape pod and launch it. After Joel's departure from the SOL, the Mads tried to "rescue" him, but gave up seconds later when they discovered that he had already safely landed in the Australian Outback. Instead of killing Mike, as they initially planned, they sent him up to take Joel's place.

After Joel's departure he returned just once, in the show's final season (episode 1001: Soultaker), having turned the escape pod into a makeshift spaceship. He returned to the SOL to make repairs to parts that were programmed to self-destruct a decade after the ship's launch into orbit and give Mike a pep talk, after which he left the satellite through the corridor to the theater, where he had entered it earlier in that episode. Joel reported that, since leaving the ship, he had traveled around the Australian outback, doing pyrotechnics for the band "Man or Astro-man?", and that he was currently working as a manager at a Hot Fish Shop in Osseo, Minnesota. (In reality, the most famous Hot Fish Shop in Minnesota had closed the weekend that episode 1001 aired, although the shop was located in Winona, Minnesota, rather than Osseo.)

After his departure, Joel was never directly mentioned until his appearance in Soultaker. However, he was indirectly referred to in the episode Santa Claus when Gypsy gives Mike a sweater as a gift, with the word "Joike" written on it, explaining that she had started knitting it when "the other guy" was present, but finished it after Mike's arrival. He was again indirectly referenced in Time Chasers by Mike's brother Eddie (who, due to a time travel mistake caused by Crow, was now in Mike's place on the SOL), who called him the "sleepy-eyed guy". After his visit in Soultaker, he was mentioned again in episode 1004 (Future War) during the film's credits. Mike attempts to do something Joel-esque, worrying the Bots, and Crow eventually asks if this has anything to do with Joel stopping by recently. Joel was referenced again in episode 1008 (Final Justice), when Mike believed he could escape after "suffering though a horrible Joe Don Baker movie" like Joel had previously (the Bots revealed that Mike's escape pod was actually the ship's water heater).

Joel's tenure as host was marked by "invention exchanges", during which Joel and his mad scientist tormentors would come up with wacky inventions in a contest with each other. These sketches were a good match for Hodgson, who began his career as a prop comic; indeed, many of the inventions were items originally found in his standup act. The gag remained during the early episodes with Mike as host, but was done away with (since the writers wanted to focus on Mike's strengths in portraying various comic characters), as were any references to the Gizmonic Institute, to which Hodgson owned the rights. The in-show reasoning behind the disposal of invention exchanges was that they were part of Gizmonic corporate culture, about which Mike (having never worked at the Institute) knew nothing. Another change was the relationship between host and bots; whereas Joel was more of a parental authority figure to Crow and Servo (in keeping with his status as their creator), the pair treated Mike more as a peer, occasionally subjecting him to pranks which they never would have considered playing on Joel.

Joel's "sleepy eyed" persona was reportedly the result of Hodgson staying up all night working non-stop on the pilot, which was kept after the pilot was shot because the crew and other performers thought it was funny. Off-camera, Hodgson wears eyeglasses, which were occasionally seen when he turns his head in profile during scenes in the theater, but was very frequently seen in the Kickstarter videos and other promotional appearances.

== Name ==
In the pilot episode of MST3K, Hodgson simply used his real name. During its run on KTMA and the first season on the nationally broadcast Comedy Channel, Joel's last name was never mentioned on air. During the second nationally broadcast season, his character began using the surname Robinson, after the protagonist of Lost in Space. (When Hodgson was later interviewed on Space Ghost Coast to Coast, Space Ghost referred to him as "Mr. Lost in Space himself, Joel Robinson".)

Joel Robinson Mystery Science Theater 3000
Media offices
Preceded by First	Host/Test Subject	Succeeded by Mike Nelson
