= Cambot =

Fictional character

- Mystery Science Theater 3000 character
- First appearance: K01 - Invaders from the Deep
- Created by: Joel Hodgson
- Portrayed by: Kevin Murphy (one occasion, character usually mute)

In-universe information
- Species: Robot
- Gender: Male

Cambot is one of the fictional robot characters on the Mystery Science Theater 3000 television series. It is through Cambot's "eye" that viewers watch Joel Robinson (later Mike Nelson and subsequently Jonah Heston) and the other robots as they watch the movies that are sent to the Satellite of Love each week.

== Appearance ==
Cambot is primarily shown during the "Robot Roll Call" sequence in the show's opening credits. In some versions of the credits, his name appears in reverse, which has been interpreted as a visual indication that he is filming himself in a mirror. Cambot's design was modified frequently in conjunction with changes to the opening sequence.

In the original KTMA season, Cambot was depicted as a robot operating a separate camera. The Season 1 version was a modified version of the KTMA Gypsy puppet, with an integrated camera. Later incarnations more closely resembled professional television recording equipment. In episode #507, I Accuse My Parents, Gypsy presents a drawing that depicts the crew of the Satellite of Love as her "ideal family." In the drawing, Cambot's torso is illustrated as a long, snakelike tube, resembling Gypsy's own body structure.

Midway through the fifth season, the show's opening sequence was reshot, and Cambot received another redesign. In this version, he appeared with a more compact shape, taking the form of a round, hovering sphere featuring a TV camera vidicon sensor as an eye. This design was retained for the remainder of the original series, although the color scheme changed from gray to blue during the transition from Comedy Central to the Sci Fi Channel.

With the relaunch of the series in Season 11, Cambot underwent a significant redesign. He was depicted as resembling a large camera lens, incorporating features such as mock studio lighting reflectors. In this version, Cambot appears to be suspended from the ceiling by an extended mounting structure.

== Overview ==
Cambot acts as an audio-visual conduit between the crew of the Satellite of Love and their observers. He also joins Joel, Mike, Crow T. Robot, and Tom Servo in the theatre when a movie is shown, and records the cast watching the film. Although a number of episodes depict the cast reacting as if traumatized by a particularly bad movie, Cambot suffered a severe reaction only once, weeping when several security cameras were systematically destroyed by the hero in episode #620: Danger!! Death Ray. (This was signified by a watery effect over the screen image). Another rare case of Cambot interacting during a movie segment came in episode #202: The Sidehackers, when Cambot added a mock ESPN scorecard on one side of the screen during the movie's race scenes.

Cambot also frequently provides music, video clips, and other enhancements to host segments. When Joel or another character requests to see through "Rocket Number Nine" (the ship-mounted camera that allows the crew to see the ship's exterior and anything in its vicinity), it is Cambot who provides the image. During the first seven seasons, when Joel or Mike would read fan mail sent to the show, they would request Cambot to put the letter on "still store," freeze framing on a close-up of the letter.

Cambot was voiced a single time during the original KTMA run by Kevin Murphy.

At the end of Season 7, Cambot was shown joining his fellow crew-members ascending into pure energy at the end of the universe. When the Satellite of Love crashed on Earth in the show's final episode, it is not specified whether Cambot survived the crash (although one could assume that he is the one filming the final scene). Cambot was not mentioned in Mystery Science Theater 3000: The Movie. Cambot is revealed to have survived the crash in the Netflix revival of the series.
