= List of Mystery Science Theater 3000 episodes =

Mystery Science Theater 3000 (MST3K) is an American television comedy series created by Joel Hodgson and originally produced by Best Brains, Inc. The show premiered on KTMA (now WUCW) in Minneapolis, Minnesota, on November 24, 1988. The next year, in 1989, the show began its national run on The Comedy Channel, running for two seasons. It continued for five more seasons on Comedy Central following The Comedy Channel's merger with Ha!: TV Comedy Network. It was cancelled in 1996, but the following year was picked up by The Sci-Fi Channel and aired for three more seasons there until another cancellation in August 1999 (although repeats continued until 2004). A sixty-episode syndication package titled The Mystery Science Theater Hour was produced in 1995.

In 2015, Hodgson led a crowdfunded revival of the series with 14 episodes in its eleventh season which was released on Netflix. A feature film, titled Mystery Science Theater 3000: The Movie, was also released on April 19, 1996.

In 2026, it was announced that Joel Hodgson had sold Mystery Science Theater 3000 to Radial Entertainment. Later that year, four new episodes, dubbed The RiffTrax Experiments, and starring the show's Sci-Fi Channel-era cast, were announced and began to see release with a theatrical screening of the first episode in September 2026. As of November 19, 2026, 234 episodes of Mystery Science Theater 3000 have been released.

== Series overview ==
Season	Episodes	Originally released		
Season	Episodes	First released	Last released	Network
KTMA	21	November 24, 1988	May 28, 1989	KTMA-TV
1	13	November 18, 1989	February 10, 1990	The Comedy Channel
2	13	September 22, 1990	February 2, 1991	The Comedy Channel
3	24	June 1, 1991	January 25, 1992	Comedy Central
4	24	June 6, 1992	January 30, 1993	Comedy Central
5	24	July 17, 1993	February 5, 1994	Comedy Central
6	24	July 16, 1994	March 25, 1995	Comedy Central
7	6	November 23, 1995	May 18, 1996	Comedy Central
Feature film		April 19, 1996		—N/a
8	22	February 1, 1997	December 6, 1997	The Sci-Fi Channel
9	13	March 14, 1998	September 26, 1998	The Sci-Fi Channel
10	13	April 11, 1999	September 12, 1999	The Sci-Fi Channel
11	14	April 14, 2017		Netflix
12	6	November 22, 2018		Netflix
13	13	May 4, 2022	December 16, 2022	Gizmoplex
14	4	September 9, 2026	November 19, 2026	RiffTrax

== Episodes ==
Episodes are listed in production number order, not production order or air date order. The episode title is next, and if the original film title is different from the episode title, it follows in parentheses. If the episode features any shorts, they are listed below. In the third column is the film's initial release year, a color/black & white notation, the production company (if known), and the country of origin. The last column shows the initial air date of the episode. Below this is a brief synopsis of the featured movie and shorts, with major cast, character, and production changes noted in italic.

=== KTMA-TV (Season 0) (1988–89) ===
No. overall	No. in season	Film	Film details	Original release date
0	0	The Green Slime	1968, Color, Toei/MGM, Japan	Unaired
A crew of astronauts work to fight off alien monsters that are threatening to overwhelm their spaceship. Note: This is a 15-minute unaired pilot designed to sell the premise of the show.
1	1	Invaders from the Deep (Stingray: "Hostages of the Deep", "Emergency Marineville", "The Big Gun" and "Deep Heat")	1981, Color, Incorporated Television Company (ITC), UK	November 24, 1988
Compilation film made from four episodes of Supermarionation series Stingray. The crew of the submarine Stingray must do battle against the evil Aquaphibian race. Note: First episode to air on KTMA-TV. First appearance of Joel Hodgson as Joel. Crow T. Robot performed by Josh Weinstein.
2	2	Revenge of the Mysterons from Mars (Captain Scarlet and the Mysterons: "Shadow of Fear", "Lunarville 7", "Crater 101", and "Dangerous Rendezvous")	1980, Color, Incorporated Television Company (ITC), UK	November 24, 1988
Compilation film made from four episodes of Supermarionation series Captain Scarlet and the Mysterons. In 2068, SPECTRUM leads the battle against a race of Martians who have the power to control matter. Note: First appearances of Trace Beaulieu as Crow T. Robot and Josh Weinstein as Tom Servo.
3	3	Star Force: Fugitive Alien II	1978/1987, Color, Tsuburaya Productions, Japan	November 27, 1988
Compilation film made from episodes of Japanese action series Star Wolf. Sequel to Fugitive Alien. Ken and the Bacchus 3 crew are ordered to destroy an alien super-weapon, then move on to attack Valnar's Star itself. Note: Due to the master tapes being missing, it was thought to be lost for decades until a VHS copy was obtained and uploaded to YouTube in March 2026.
4	4	Gamera vs. Barugon (Daikaijū Kettō: Gamera tai Barugon)	1966, Color, Daiei Film Co. Ltd., Japan	December 4, 1988
A group of men collude to steal a giant jewel from an Asian jungle. The jewel is actually an egg, which hatches into mutant lizard Barugon, who battles Gamera.
5	5	Gamera (Daikaijū Gamera)	1965, B&W, Daiei Film Co. Ltd., Japan	December 11, 1988
A military plane crashes in the Arctic, awakening giant turtle Gamera. It attacks Japan, yet seemingly befriends a young boy.
6	6	Gamera vs. Gaos (Gamera tai Gyaosu)	1967, Color, Daiei Film Co. Ltd., Japan	December 18, 1988
Gamera fights the pterosaur-like Gaos.
7	7	Gamera vs. Zigra (Gamera tai Shinkai Kaijū Jigura)	1971, Color, Daiei Film Co. Ltd., Japan	January 1, 1989
Gamera fights the shark-like alien Zigra, who, with the help of a woman under his control, attempts to take over Earth from its polluting inhabitants. Note: First appearances of Trace Beaulieu as Dr. Clayton Forrester and Josh Weinstein as Dr. Laurence Erhardt.
8	8	Gamera vs. Guiron (Gamera tai Daikaijū Giron)	1969, Color, Daiei Film Co. Ltd., Japan	January 8, 1989
Brain-eating aliens abduct two boys from Japan. Gamera attempts to rescue them, but must fight the knife-headed monster Guiron.
9	9	Phase IV	1974, Color, Paramount, UK/USA	January 15, 1989
Scientists do battle against a colony of ants given sentience by a unique cosmological phenomenon.
10	10	Cosmic Princess (Space: 1999: "The Metamorph" and "Space Warp")	1976/1982, Color, Group 3 Ltd., UK	January 22, 1989
Compilation film made from two episodes of sci-fi series Space: 1999. First, a ship's commander is captured by an evil mastermind and his shapeshifting daughter, and is soon faced with a terrible choice. Then, the daughter loses control of her powers and attacks her colleagues, threatening the ship itself.
11	11	Humanoid Woman (Cherez ternii k zvyozdam)	1981, Color, Maxim Gorky Filmstudio, USSR	January 29, 1989
An amnesiac female clone with telekinetic powers learns about her past and leads an expedition back to her heavily-polluted home planet.
12	12	Fugitive Alien (Star Wolf)	1978/1986, Color, Tsuburaya Productions, Japan	February 5, 1989
Compilation film made from two episodes of Japanese action series Star Wolf. An alien marauder becomes a fugitive from his planet Valna, then joins the Earth spaceship Bacchus 3 to fight against his former masters. (Later reused for Episode #57)
13	13	SST: Death Flight	1977, Color, ABC Circle Films, USA	February 19, 1989
A supersonic transport plane attempting a world speed record on its maiden flight is overrun with mechanical problems and a lethal virus, putting its passengers and crew in extreme danger.
14	14	Mighty Jack (Maiti Jakku)	1968/1986, Color, Tsuburaya Productions, Japan	February 26, 1989
Compilation film made from two episodes of Japanese action series Mighty Jack. A world-protecting organization and their flying submarine – both called "Mighty Jack" – fight the terrorist organization "Q".
15	15	Superdome	1978, Color, ABC Circle Films, USA	March 12, 1989
Four loosely-connected plots around a murder that occurs before the Super Bowl, about to begin at the Louisiana Superdome.
16	16	City on Fire	1979, Color, Astral, Canada	March 19, 1989
A disgruntled employee of an oil refinery set in the middle of a large city sabotages the refinery after getting fired, causing an inferno that puts the whole city at risk.
17	17	Time of the Apes (Saru No Gundan)	1974/1987, Color, Tsuburaya Productions, Japan	April 2, 1989
Compilation film made from episodes of Japanese TV series Saru no Gundan. At a laboratory, a woman and two children take refuge in cryogenic capsules during an earthquake, only to awake as fugitives in a world populated by anthropomorphic apes.
18	18	The Million Eyes of Sumuru	1967, Color, AIP, UK	May 7, 1989
Two CIA agents in Hong Kong investigate the leader of an all-female army that is bent on world domination.
19	19	Hangar 18	1980, Color, Taft International, USA	May 14, 1989
Two astronauts witness a UFO crash landing on Earth, and find themselves getting stymied by a government conspiracy to cover it up.
20	20	The Last Chase	1981, Color, Crown International	May 21, 1989
In a distant future where the United States is a police state overrun by a plague and private automobiles are outlawed, an ex-racer and a young kid attempt to escape by driving to free territory in California.
21	21	The "Legend of Dinosaurs" (Kyōryū Kaichō no Densetsu)	1977, Color, Toei Company Ltd., Japan	May 28, 1989
Prehistoric beasts are discovered rampaging near modern day Mount Fuji. Note: Final episode for KTMA-TV.

=== Season 1 (1989–90) ===
No. overall	No. in season	Film	Film details	Original release date
22	1	The Crawling Eye (The Trollenberg Terror)	1958, B&W, DCA/Wade Williams, UK	TBA
A U.N. representative, a scientist, and a young woman with psychic abilities come across a swarm of extraterrestrial creatures killing off mountain climbers in a small Swiss village. Note: First episode for The Comedy Channel. Jim Mallon's first appearance as Gypsy.
23	2	The Robot vs. The Aztec Mummy (La momia azteca contra el robot humano); With short: Radar Men from the Moon, Part 1: "Moon Rocket"	1958, B&W, Cinematográfica Calderón S.A./K. Gordon Murray, Mexico	TBA
Scientists search for the ancient breastplate of an Aztec mummy, culminating in a mad scientist's attempt to fight the creature through the construction of a humanoid robot. Short: "Commando Cody", a scientist who dons a helmet and jet pack, sets out to thwart the evil plans of Moon Men and their criminal associates.
24	3	The Mad Monster; With short: Radar Men from the Moon, Part 2: "Molten Terror"	1942, B&W, PRC/Trans America Film Corporation, USA	December 2, 1989; Unconfirmed
A mad scientist turns his kindly gardener into a werewolf, who he uses to murder the critics who spoke out against him. Short: Commando Cody attempts to escape moon-dwelling aliens while in the possession of an atomic weapon.
25	4	Women of the Prehistoric Planet	1966, Color, Realart/Wade Williams, USA	February 10, 1990; Unconfirmed
A spaceship crash lands on an alien world, and an attempt is made by its companion ship to locate any survivors. Note: Josh Weinstein's last produced appearance in the original series.
26	5	The Corpse Vanishes; With short: Radar Men from the Moon, Part 3: "Bridge of Death"	1942, B&W, Monogram/Prime TV Films, USA	December 9, 1989
A driven young reporter attempts to deduce the cause behind a series of brides dying on their wedding days, and then expose the botanist/scientist who has been doing so to keep his wife healthy and youthful. Short: Commando Cody pursues gangsters after returning to Earth.
27	6	The Crawling Hand	1963, B&W, AIP/Medallion, USA	December 16, 1989
When an astronaut's destroyed capsule crashes in the ocean, his disembodied arm is found by a young teenager, who becomes possessed by the murderous alien force similarly possessing the arm.
28	7	Robot Monster; With shorts: Radar Men from the Moon, Part 4: "Flight to Destruction"; Part 5: "Murder Car"	1953, B&W [3-D], Astor/Medallion, USA	December 23, 1989
After destroying all civilization on Earth, a malevolent alien invader attempts to wipe out the last surviving human family and their comrades. Shorts: Commando Cody's assistant is kidnapped, leading to the pursuit of gangsters working for aliens from the Moon.
29	8	The Slime People; With short: Radar Men from the Moon, Part 6: "Hills of Death"	1963, B&W, Hansen Enterprises/Medallion, USA	December 30, 1989
A race of underground reptilian creatures emerge from the Earth's crust to attack Los Angeles, and it's up to a sportscaster and a band of survivors to mount a counter-offensive. Short: Commando Cody pursues gangsters that have caused flooding through the use of an atomic bomb.
30	9	Project Moonbase; With shorts: Radar Men from the Moon, Part 7: "Camouflaged Destruction"; Part 8: "The Enemy Planet"	1953, B&W, Lippert/Wade Williams, USA	January 6, 1990
In a futuristic version of 1970, a group of astronauts working for the U.S. space program plans the first crewed flight around the moon, but they are infiltrated by a Communist spy who inadvertently causes the team to become stranded on the Moon itself. Shorts: Commando Cody fights gangsters who have acquired another atomic ray, and eventually returns to the moon in an attempt to sabotage moon-dwelling enemies.
31	10	Robot Holocaust; With short: Radar Men from the Moon, Part 9: "Battle in the Stratosphere" (Partial)	1987, Color, Tycill Entertainment/Empire, USA	January 13, 1990
In a post-apocalyptic future, a rag-tag band of renegades fight to free mankind and control the last remaining city by overthrowing an all-powerful evil, braving the Room of Questions, the Vault of Beasts, and other menacing creations. Short: Commando Cody attempts to escape with a load of stolen Lunarium.
32	11	Moon Zero Two	1969, Color, Hammer/Warner, UK	January 20, 1990
On a colonized moon, a sinister tycoon aims to have a disaffected former-astronaut-turned-satellite-salvager fulfill his desire for obtaining a sapphire asteroid, while at the same time, a woman comes to the salvager to help search for her brother, a miner last seen working a distant patch of moonscape.
33	12	Untamed Youth	1957, B&W, Warner, USA	January 27, 1990; Unconfirmed
Two hitchhiking sisters are sentenced to thirty days of labor at a cotton farm run by the corrupt county government. They and the son of the judge who sentenced them then try to escape and reveal the truth about their sentences to the authorities.
34	13	The Black Scorpion	1957, B&W, Warner, USA/Mexico	February 3, 1990
Giant prehistoric scorpions emerge and go on a rampage in Mexico after a volcanic eruption.

=== Season 2 (1990–91) ===
No. overall	No. in season	Film	Film details	Original release date
35	1	Rocketship X-M	1950, B&W, Lippert/Wade Williams, USA	September 22, 1990
An experimental rocketship is accidentally diverted from the Moon to Mars, where the crew finds the ruins of a long-lost Martian civilization that bombed itself back to the Stone Age. Note: First appearances of Frank Conniff as TV's Frank and Kevin Murphy as Tom Servo.
36	2	The Sidehackers (Five the Hard Way)	1969, Color, Crown International, USA	September 29, 1990
A mild-mannered mechanic known to engage in a new motorcycle sport runs afoul of a violent, megalomaniacal stunt rider, after his scheming girlfriend wants to change boyfriends.
37	3	Jungle Goddess; With short: The Phantom Creeps, Chapter 1: "The Menacing Power"	1948, B&W, Lippert/Weiss Global, USA	October 6, 1990
Two freelance pilots set out to find a wealthy heiress lost in remote Africa to gain a reward. They find her being worshiped by a native tribe, which becomes problematic when one of the pilots angers them. Short: Dr. Zorka, a mad scientist bent on world domination, fakes his death when the government decides to look into his research.
38	4	Catalina Caper	1967, Color, Crown International, USA	October 13, 1990
Two college boys enjoy sunshine, scuba diving, and beach "bunnies" on Catalina Island, while another boy's con-artist parents scheme to sell a forgery of a stolen scroll.
39	5	Rocket Attack U.S.A. With short: The Phantom Creeps, Chapter 2: "Death Stalks the Highway"	1958, B&W, Exploit Films/Medallion, USA	October 27, 1990
The U.S. sends spies to the Soviet Union to discover plans for imminent missile attacks, while at the same time trying to play catch-up with their own missile program. Short: Dr. Zorka unleashes robotic spiders on prying police officers.
40	6	Ring of Terror; With short: The Phantom Creeps, Chapter 3: "Crashing Timbers"	1961, B&W, Ashcroft, USA	November 3, 1990
A seemingly-fearless college student must steal a ring from a dead man's hand to join a fraternity. Short: Dr. Zorka continues to hide from the authorities after faking his death.
41	7	Wild Rebels	1967, Color, Crown International, USA	November 17, 1990
A retired stock-car racer is recruited by a biker gang to serve as their getaway driver, while the police ask him to bring the gang to justice.
42	8	Lost Continent	1951, B&W, Lippert/Weiss Global, USA	November 24, 1990
An American military/science team searches for a downed rocket at the top of a remote mountain, only to discover a dinosaur-infested jungle left over from a prehistoric era.
43	9	The Hellcats	1968, Color, Crown International, USA	December 8, 1990
When an undercover cop is killed by a drug boss, his fiancée and brother join the drug-running, woman-led biker gang who handles the boss' deliveries to get justice.
44	10	King Dinosaur; With short: X Marks the Spot	1955, B&W, Lippert/Weiss Global, USA	December 22, 1990
Two carefully-chosen scientist couples travel into space to investigate a mysterious new planet, where they are menaced by dinosaurs and other giant animals. Short: A safety film which reviews the vehicular misdeeds of an accident victim in a Heaven-like courtroom.
45	11	First Spaceship on Venus (Der Schweigende Stern)	1960, Color, DEFA (GDR) /Iluzjon Filmunit/Gold Key, East Germany/Poland	December 29, 1990
An object from Venus containing a scrambled message is discovered by scientists, who send a multinational team of astronauts to the planet, where they find a civilization destroyed by nuclear war and a similar threat to Earth.
46	12	Godzilla vs. Megalon (Gojira tai Megaro)	1973, Color, Toho/Cinema Shares, Japan	January 19, 1991
Godzilla and Jet Jaguar battle Megalon and Gigan, sent by an undersea civilization to raze the surface in its name.
47	13	Godzilla vs. the Sea Monster (Gojira-Ebira-Mosura: Nankai no Daikettō)	1966, Color, Toho/Walter-Reade Organization, Japan	February 2, 1991
A man searching for his lost brother and his companions wash ashore on an island where an evil paramilitary group has built an installation. Godzilla and Mothra are soon called into action to stop the monstrous crustacean that guards the island. Note: Last episode for the Comedy Channel, prior to its merger with the competing Ha! network to form what would eventually be called Comedy Central.

=== Season 3 (1991–92) ===
No. overall	No. in season	Film	Film details	Original release date
48	1	Cave Dwellers (The Blade Master)	1984, Color, Metaxa Film/New Line Cinema/Royal Film Traders/Film Ventures International, Italy/USA	June 1, 1991
In the first sequel to Ator, the Fighting Eagle, Ator helps a warrior woman rescue her father, a wise man, from an evil overlord who wishes to learn the whereabouts of a powerful weapon. Note: First episode for Comedy Central.
49	2	Gamera (Daikaijū Gamera)	1965, B&W, Daiei/Sandy Frank, Japan	June 8, 1991
A military plane crashes in the Arctic, awakening the giant turtle Gamera from hibernation. The beast attacks Japan as authorities around the world work to stop it, yet it seemingly befriends a young boy.
50	3	Pod People (Los nuevos extraterrestres)	1983, Color, Almena Films/Film Ventures International, Spain/France	June 15, 1991
A child adopts a large egg he finds in a cave, which hatches into a mischievous alien. Meanwhile, the child's family, a trio of poachers, and a group of pop musicians on a wilderness vacation run into trouble when the alien's angry mother comes looking for its young.
51	4	Gamera vs. Barugon (Daikaijū Kessen: Gamera tai Barugon)	1966, Color, Daiei/AIP-TV/Sandy Frank, Japan	June 22, 1991
A group of men conspire to steal a giant opal from a distant jungle. The opal is actually an egg, which hatches into mutant lizard Barugon, which attacks Japan and battles Gamera.
52	5	Stranded in Space (The Stranger)	1973, Color, Bing Crosby Productions/Film Ventures International, USA	June 29, 1991
An astronaut winds up on an alternate version of Earth hidden behind the sun and tries to get back to the regular Earth before the mirror-Earth's totalitarian government can catch him.
53	6	Time of the Apes (Saru No Gundan)	1974/edited 1987, Color, Tsuburaya Productions/Sandy Frank, Japan	July 13, 1991
Compilation film made from episodes of Japanese TV series Saru no Gundan. In a cryogenics laboratory, a woman and two children take refuge in freezing capsules during an earthquake, only to awaken in a world populated by anthropomorphic apes.
54	7	Daddy-O; With short: Alphabet Antics	1958, B&W, AIP/Selma Enterprises/Teleworld, USA	July 20, 1991
A drag-racing crooner gets involved with a blonde bombshell, investigates his friend's death, and becomes a courier for drug dealers. Short: An educational short that takes viewers on a rhyming tour of the English alphabet.
55	8	Gamera vs. Gaos (Gamera tai Gyaosu)	1967, Color, Daiei/AIP-TV/Sandy Frank, Japan	July 27, 1991
Gamera fights the pterosaur monster Gaos. At the same time, a group of villagers want to stop a highway from going through their land, and the village leader's grandson becomes fascinated with the monsters.
56	9	The Amazing Colossal Man	1957, B&W, AIP/Selma Enterprises/Teleworld, USA	August 3, 1991
A military officer is accidentally exposed to the blast of an experimental plutonium bomb while trying to rescue a downed pilot, turning him into a giant who ultimately goes on a rampage.
57	10	Fugitive Alien (Star Wolf)	1978/edited 1986, Color, Tsuburaya Productions/Sandy Frank, Japan	August 17, 1991
Movie constructed from two episodes of the Japanese television show Star Wolf. An alien marauder becomes a fugitive from his planet, then joins an Earth spaceship to fight against his former masters.
58	11	It Conquered the World; With short: Snow Thrills	1956, B&W, AIP/Selma Enterprises/Teleworld, USA	August 24, 1991
With the help of a naive scientist, an alien from Venus invades Earth and attempts to turn humans into emotionless servants with bat-like creatures. Short: A newsreel featuring a wide variety of winter sports.
59	12	Gamera vs. Guiron (Gamera tai Daikaijū Giron)	1969, Color, Daiei/AIP-TV/Sandy Frank, Japan	September 7, 1991
Two young boys accidentally hijack an alien spaceship and fly it to a dying planet, where they encounter two evil alien women who wish to eat their brains. Gamera attempts to rescue them, but must fight the knife-headed monster Guiron.
60	13	Earth vs. the Spider; With short: Speech: Using Your Voice	1958, B&W, AIP/Selma Enterprises/Teleworld, USA	September 14, 1991
A teenage girl, along with her boyfriend, her science teacher, and the local sheriff, discovers that her father has been eaten by a giant spider, which then rampages through her small town. Short: An educational film that demonstrates the dos and don'ts of using one's voice during public speaking.
61	14	Mighty Jack	1968/edited 1987, Color, Tsuburaya Productions/Sandy Frank, Japan	September 21, 1991
Movie constructed from the first and last episodes of the Japanese television show of the same name. A world-protecting organization and their flying submarine fight a nefarious terrorist organization.
62	15	Teenage Caveman; With shorts: Aquatic Wizards and Catching Trouble	1958, B&W, AIP/Selma Enterprises/Teleworld, USA	October 12, 1991
In a seemingly-prehistoric world, a rebellious young hunter rails against the seemingly arbitrary laws of his clan to explore the forbidden land "beyond the river". Shorts: Two newsreels; one about water-skiing acrobatics; the other featuring trapper Ross Allen demonstrating his prowess at catching animals in the Everglades.
63	16	Gamera vs. Zigra (Gamera tai Shinkai Kaijū Jigura)	1971, Color, Daiei/Sandy Frank, Japan	October 19, 1991
Gamera fights the shark-like alien Zigra, who, with the help of a woman under his control, attempts to take over Earth.
64	17	Viking Women and the Sea Serpent (The Saga of the Viking Women and Their Voyage to the Waters of the Great Sea Serpent); With short: The Home Economics Story	1957, B&W, AIP/Selma Enterprises/Teleworld, USA/1951, Color, Iowa State College, USA	October 26, 1991
Vikings' wives set sail across the sea to rescue their husbands, who are being held hostage by Grimolt barbarians. Short: An educational short where four young women learn the value of home economics degrees.
65	18	Star Force: Fugitive Alien II (Star Wolf)	1978/1986, Color, Tsuburaya Productions/Sandy Frank, Japan	November 16, 1991
In the continuation of Fugitive Alien, the crew of Bacchus 3 are ordered to destroy an alien super-weapon, then move on to attack Valna itself, where Ken confronts his former master.
66	19	War of the Colossal Beast; With short: Mr. B Natural	1958, B&W/Color, AIP/Selma Enterprises/Teleworld, USA	November 30, 1991
In the sequel to The Amazing Colossal Man, Glenn Manning, the disfigured and deranged giant, is found ravaging bread trucks in Mexico. He is captured and brought back to the United States, where his worried sister tries to get him to remember his former life. Short: An educational short where a magical pixie urges an adolescent boy to take up a musical instrument.
67	20	The Unearthly; With shorts: Posture Pals and Appreciating Our Parents	1957, B&W, Republic/PRO, USA	December 14, 1991
A surgeon performs unethical medical experiments on his patients in a remote sanitarium, and he acquires said patients through nefarious methods. Shorts: Two educational shorts; one where a foursome of elementary school kids improve their posture; the other where a young boy learns to value his parents.
68	21	Santa Claus Conquers the Martians	1964, Color, Embassy, USA	December 21, 1991
The king of Mars has discovered that his children have become lethargic and disillusioned after having all their information directly fed into their brains. To this end, he and his people abduct Santa Claus, as well as two human children, in hopes of bringing Christmas to their planet.
69	22	Master Ninja I (The Master: "Max" and "Out-of-Time Step")	1984, Color, Film Ventures International, USA	January 11, 1992
Episodes of TV show The Master cut together into a series of movies. An occidental ninja searches for a long-lost daughter he never knew he had with the help of his new protege, a drifter with a hamster and a custom van. In this installment, they defend an airport owner from businessmen and a corrupt sheriff, then defend a nightclub owner from thugs, all while avoiding ninjas that have been sent to kill the ninja.
70	23	The Castle of Fu Manchu (Die Folterkammer des Dr. Fu Man Chu)	1969, Color, International Cinema/PRO, Germany/Spain/Italy/UK	January 18, 1992
The evil Fu Manchu threatens to freeze the Earth's oceans in his latest bid for world conquest, and abducts a talented scientist with heart problems in the process.
71	24	Master Ninja II (The Master: "State of the Union" and "Hostages")	1984, Color, Film Ventures International, USA	January 25, 1992
The continuation of Master Ninja I. In this installment, John and Max help a tuna cannery union organizer, then save a senator's daughter from international terrorists.

=== Season 4 (1992–93) ===
No. overall	No. in season	Film	Film details	Original release date
72	1	Space Travelers (Marooned)	1969, Color, Columbia, USA	June 6, 1992
Various obstacles hamper the attempts of NASA to rescue three astronauts trapped aboard a crippled space capsule.
73	2	The Giant Gila Monster	1959, B&W, McLendon Radio Pictures, USA	June 13, 1992
A 30-foot Gila monster is on the loose in the woods near a small town, home to a gang of hot-rodding teens.
74	3	City Limits	1984, Color, Showtime/Island Pictures, USA	June 20, 1992
In a dystopian future where the majority of adults have died off, a teen rides his motorcycle into an abandoned city and gets involved in a gang dispute, where different biker gangs work to take the city back from an evil corporation.
75	4	Teenagers from Outer Space	1959, B&W, Warner, USA	June 27, 1992
A group of humanoid aliens land on Earth and decide to use the planet as a farm for their giant, lobster-like livestock. One of the aliens rebels and flees to a small town, where he falls in love with a teenage girl and is pursued by another alien who kills anyone in his path.
76	5	Being from Another Planet (Time Walker)	1982, Color, New World/New Horizons, USA	July 4, 1992
In California, a mummy found in King Tut's tomb is X-rayed by a university science team. The radiation awakens the mummy, which escapes the lab and creeps around campus looking for five missing crystals that were pilfered by a student, all while killing anything in its path.
77	6	Attack of the Giant Leeches; With short: Undersea Kingdom, Part 1: "Beneath the Ocean Floor"	1959, B&W, AIP/Orion, USA	July 18, 1992
The residents of a Florida swamp town begin disappearing, and a game warden discovers that the culprits are large mutant leeches. Short: A group of Navy men discover the lost city of Atlantis.
78	7	The Killer Shrews; With short: Junior Rodeo Daredevils	1959, B&W, McLendon Radio Pictures, USA	July 25, 1992
A supply boat skipper makes a delivery to a small island, and meets a band of heavy-drinking scientists who were doing genetic experiments on shrews, turning them into a pack of ravenous dog-like monsters. Short: An educational short where an old cowpoke straightens out some wayward kids by making them put on a small-time rodeo.
79	8	Hercules Unchained (Ercole e la regina di Lidia)	1959, Color, Avco Embassy, Italy	August 1, 1992
Hercules sets off on mission to stop a war, but is sidetracked by the hypnotic Queen Omphale, who casts a spell of amnesia on him so he becomes a prisoner in her harem.
80	9	Indestructible Man; With short: Undersea Kingdom, Part 2: "The Undersea City"	1956, B&W, Allied Artists/Warner, USA	August 15, 1992
After a notorious convict dies in the gas chamber, his body is taken by a pair of scientists. The scientists bring him back to life and give him near-total invulnerability, whereupon he kills them and sets out to get even with those who squealed on him. Short: The people of Atlantis capture the Navy men who discovered their city.
81	10	Hercules Against the Moon Men (Maciste e la regina di Samar)	1964, Color, Governor, Italy/France	August 22, 1992
Hercules attempts to free a city from the evil Queen Samar, who is in cahoots with a cult of moon men.
82	11	The Magic Sword	1962, Color, MGM/UA, USA	August 29, 1992
A knight tries to save a princess from an evil sorcerer with the aid of his magical foster mother.
83	12	Hercules and the Captive Women (Ercole alla conquista di Atlantide)	1961, Color, Woolner Bros, France/Italy	September 12, 1992
Hercules ventures to Atlantis to save his son and his friend, but the evil Queen Antinea stands in his way.
84	13	Manhunt in Space; Rocky Jones, Space Ranger: ("The Pirates of Prah: Chapter I", "The Pirates of Prah: Chapter II" and "The Pirates of Prah: Chapter III"); With short: General Hospital, first installment	1954, B&W, ITC, USA	September 19, 1992
Edited-together episodes of the 1950s TV series Rocky Jones, Space Ranger. Rocky Jones and his sidekick Winky run afoul of space pirates working for Queen Cleolanta. Short: Dr. Phil Brewer is invited to the engagement party of the woman he is having an affair with, and Dr. Steve Hardy informs a patient of her hernia diagnosis.
85	14	Tormented	1960, B&W, Cheviot Productions/Warner, USA	September 26, 1992
A jazz pianist living in a beachfront community is about to get married, but his troublesome mistress confronts him at the top of a lighthouse. In the ensuing argument, the mistress slips and falls; the pianist has a chance to save her, but chooses to let her fall to her death. As a result, the woman's ghost haunts him and threatens to disrupt his upcoming nuptials, especially when his fiancé's eight-year-old sister grows suspicious.
86	15	The Beatniks; With short: General Hospital, second installment	1958, B&W, Barjul, USA	November 25, 1992
The leader of a gang of hoodlums is heard singing along with the jukebox at a greasy spoon by a talent agent. The young man quickly becomes a rising star, but he can’t shake his gang, who threaten to ruin his career out of jealousy for his success. Short: Tensions run high during Dr. Brewer's engagement party.
87	16	Fire Maidens of Outer Space (Fire Maidens from Outer Space)	1956, B&W, Topaz, UK	November 26, 1992
A group of astronauts travel to a newly-discovered moon of Jupiter and discover a civilization composed entirely of women. The astronauts soon help the women battle a monster that has been terrorizing their settlement.
88	17	Crash of Moons (Rocky Jones, Space Ranger: "Crash of Moons: Chapter I", "Crash of Moons: Chapter II" and "Crash of Moons: Chapter III"); With short: General Hospital, third installment	1954, B&W, ITC, USA	November 28, 1992
Edited-together episodes of the 1950s TV series Rocky Jones, Space Ranger. Rocky Jones and Winky try to save the inhabitants of two worlds that are about to collide. Short: Dr. Brewer's marriage and affair both begin to fall apart.
89	18	Attack of the The Eye Creatures (The Eye Creatures)	1967, Color, AIP/Teleworld, USA	December 5, 1992
A group of multi-eyed aliens land near a small town and are encountered by smooching teenagers. While the military investigates, the kids band together to fight back against the invaders.
90	19	The Rebel Set; With short: Johnny at the Fair	1959, B&W, Allied Artists/Warner, USA	December 12, 1992
A crooked coffeehouse owner wants to knock off an armored car, so he recruits three struggling beatniks to help him out. Short: An educational film where a young boy explores the 1947 Canadian National Exhibition.
91	20	The Human Duplicators	1965, Color, Woolner Bros/Warner, USA	December 26, 1992
An alien takes over a scientist's basement laboratory, using the machinery therein to make android clones to infiltrate the government.
92	21	Monster a Go-Go; With short: Circus on Ice	1965, B&W, BI&L, USA	January 9, 1993
The military and the civil authorities go hunting for a missing astronaut, who they believe has returned to Earth as an irradiated monster. Short: A newsreel which takes a look at the 40th Annual Carnival of the Toronto Skating Club.
93	22	The Day the Earth Froze (Sampo); With short: Here Comes the Circus	1959, Color, Mosfilm/Suomi-Filmi/AIP/Orion, Finland/USSR	January 16, 1993
A valiant prince must stop a wicked witch's schemes to get, and later regain, a magic mill. Short: A newsreel which takes a look at the Clyde Beatty circus.
94	23	Bride of the Monster; With short: Hired!, Part 1	1955, B&W, Banner/Wade Williams, USA	January 23, 1993
A mad scientist in a remote swamp attempts to create an army of atomic supermen in his lab. He performs experiments on any intruders that approach his house, and feeds his enemies to a giant octopus in his moat. His actions soon attract the attention of a reporter and the police, who work to stop him. Short: An instructional film where a Chevrolet sales manager wonders why his team is having trouble selling their product door-to-door.
95	24	Manos: The Hands of Fate; With short: Hired!, Part 2	1966, Color, Emerson/PRO, USA	January 30, 1993
A hapless family on vacation in rural Texas take refuge at a "lodge" that acts as the home of a demonic emissary, his hellhound, his goat-legged servant, and his harem. Short: The conclusion to the two-part film, where the Chevrolet manager gets advice from his father.

=== Season 5 (1993–94) ===
No. overall	No. in season	Film	Film details	Original release date
96	1	Warrior of the Lost World	1984, Color, Visto International/Epic, Italy	July 24, 1993
A hero and his talking, computerized motorcycle fight off an evil dictator in a post-apocalyptic world.
97	2	Hercules (Le fatiche di Ercole)	1958, Color, Avco Embassy, Italy	July 17, 1993
Hercules searches for the Golden Fleece, then helps King Jason wrest his throne away from an impostor and his son.
98	3	Swamp Diamonds (Swamp Women); With short: What to Do on a Date	1956, Color, Woolner Bros/MCA, USA	July 31, 1993
A band of female thieves break out of prison, hoping to recover a cache of stolen diamonds hidden in the nearby swamp. They are accompanied by an undercover cop and a wealthy oil baron, whose affection for one of the girls threatens to tear them apart. Short: An educational film where a young man desires to ask his schoolmate on a date, and needs help thinking of a venue they'll both enjoy.
99	4	Secret Agent Super Dragon (New York chiama Superdrago)	1966, Color, United Screen Arts, France/Italy/West Germany	August 7, 1993
A suave CIA agent is sent to Amsterdam to investigate a sinister crime organization, whose boss is bent on poisoning the United States' populace with an exotic, mind-altering drug.
100	5	The Magic Voyage of Sinbad (Sadko)	1953, Color, Filmgroup, USSR	August 14, 1993
Sadko (renamed "Sinbad" in this English-dubbed version) sets sail to find the Bluebird of Happiness, hoping it will bring peace and prosperity to his destitute town.
101	6	Eegah	1962, Color, Fairway International, USA	August 28, 1993
A teenage girl and her scientist father discover a giant caveman living in a cave in the desert. Having fallen in love with the girl, the caveman follows her to modern civilization, to her boyfriend's chagrin.
102	7	I Accuse My Parents; With short: The Truck Farmer	1944, B&W, Producers Releasing Corp/PRO, USA	September 4, 1993
A high school student who is neglected and humiliated by his rich, drunken, inattentive parents, soon gets mixed up with a crime syndicate, blaming his parents for his downfall. Short: A documentary film that explains the then-new techniques that enabled farmers to rush produce to market.
103	8	Operation Double 007 (O.K. Connery)	1967, Color, MGM/UA, Italy	September 11, 1993
The brother of a British agent, who is also a plastic surgeon, hypnotist, and champion archer (played by Neil Connery, real-life brother of Sean) is sent to combat a villain and his harem to stop them from conquering the world with radioactive rugs.
104	9	The Girl in Lovers Lane	1960, B&W, Filmgroup, USA	September 18, 1993
An experienced and world-weary drifter meets a runaway rich kid aboard a train. Taking the kid under his wing, the drifter stops off in a small town, where his protege gets involved in the love life of a local waitress.
105	10	The Painted Hills; With short: Body Care and Grooming	1951, Color, MGM/Turner, USA	September 26, 1993
In 1870s California, the treasured dog of a prospector embarks on a quest to dispense justice against the rival prospector who murdered him. Short: An educational film that teaches college students how to improve their hygiene.
106	11	Gunslinger	1956, Color, AIP/Orion, USA	October 9, 1993
When a local marshal is killed by outlaws, his widow takes over his duties and vows to clean up her small town, with some assistance from a man hired to kill her.
107	12	Mitchell	1975, Color, Allied Artists/Warner, USA	October 23, 1993
A slovenly, beer-guzzling cop pursues drug traffickers and aims to bring their boss to justice. Note: Joel Hodgson's last regular appearance as host; Michael J. Nelson's first episode as Mike Nelson.
108	13	The Brain That Wouldn't Die	1962, B&W, AIP/Orion, USA	October 30, 1993
When a young woman is decapitated in a car accident, her surgeon fiancée keeps her head alive in his laboratory while he tries to find her a new body. Note: Michael J. Nelson's first episode as host.
109	14	Teen-Age Strangler (Terror in the Night); With short: Is This Love?	1964, Color, Ajay, USA	November 7, 1993
A serial killer has been strangling teenage girls in a small West Virginia town, and the drag-racing son of a newly-arrived family is labeled the prime suspect. It's up to his girlfriend and younger brother to prove his innocence and find the actual killer. Short: An educational short which contrasts the relationships of two young couples.
110	15	The Wild Wild World of Batwoman; With short: Cheating	1966, B&W, ADP Productions/PRO, USA	November 13, 1993
Crimefighter Batwoman and her network of female assistants battle a duo of villains who have stolen an atomic hearing aid. Short: An educational short which chronicles the downfall of a high school student caught copying his test answers from a fellow student.
111	16	Alien from L.A.	1988, Color, Cannon/Golan-Globus, USA	November 20, 1993
A clumsy valley girl with a high-pitched voice is told that her explorer father has died. When she looks for him, she ends up falling into the center of the Earth and landing in the lost civilization of Atlantis, where the government and the criminal element try to capture her.
112	17	Beginning of the End	1957, B&W, Republic/PRO, USA	November 25, 1993
A government researcher has been experimenting with radioactive materials to boost crop production. In the process, he accidentally created a hungry army of giant grasshoppers, which the military must stop before they reach Chicago.
113	18	The Atomic Brain (Monstrosity); With short: What about Juvenile Delinquency?	1963, B&W, Emerson/PRO, USA	December 4, 1993
A wealthy, elderly widow wants her private doctor to transplant her brain into the body of one of the young women she's captured. Short: An educational short that focuses on a gang member who realizes the dangers of delinquency when his dad is mugged and beaten by the gang he is a part of.
114	19	Outlaw (Outlaw of Gor)	1988, Color, Cannon Group/Breton Film Productions/Warner, USA/South Africa	December 11, 1993
In the sequel to 1988's Gor, college professor Tarl Cabot returns to the primitive planet Gor with an annoying sidekick, and is soon caught up in the intrigue of the planet's power-hungry new queen. Note: Last episode of the original series to formally feature the "Invention Exchange".
115	20	Radar Secret Service; With short: Last Clear Chance	1950, B&W, Lippert/Weiss Global, USA	December 18, 1993
The Secret Service uses newly-invented radar to track down a band of smugglers and recover the uranium they stole. Short: A safety film produced by Union Pacific Railroad that teaches drivers to pay better attention when crossing railroad tracks.
116	21	Santa Claus	1959, Color, Cinematográfica Calderón S.A./K. Gordon Murray, Mexico	December 24, 1993
On Christmas Eve, a demon attempts to destroy Santa Claus' reputation by trying to sabotage his delivery run and convincing kids everywhere to do evil deeds.
117	22	Teen-Age Crime Wave	1955, B&W, Columbia, USA	January 15, 1994
After breaking out of prison, a band of teenage fugitives hold a farm family hostage, prompting the police to instigate a stand-off.
118	23	Village of the Giants	1965, Color, Avco Embassy, USA	January 22, 1994
A child prodigy accidentally creates an experimental chemical which turns anything that eats it into a giant. When a band of delinquent teens eat the chemical and become the capricious rulers of his small town, it's up to the prodigy's older sister and her boyfriend to stop them while the young boy himself tries to recreate the chemical.
119	24	12 to the Moon; With short: Design for Dreaming	1960, B&W, Columbia, USA	February 5, 1994
A crew of twelve multinational astronauts venture to the moon, where they discover advanced beings who want no contact with humanity. Short: A musical short where a woman dances her way through a futuristic fantasy world of cars and home appliances.

=== Season 6 (1994–95) ===
No. overall	No. in season	Film	Film details	Original release date
120	1	Girls Town	1959, B&W, MGM/Turner, USA	July 16, 1994
A young man's mysterious death lands the teenage bombshell he was courting framed for the incident and placed in a reform school headed by good-hearted nuns, but the girl's sister is in trouble.
121	2	Invasion U.S.A. With short: A Date with Your Family	1952, B&W, Columbia, USA	July 23, 1994
A group of ordinary Americans in a bar, after debating about the universal draft, discover that "The Enemy" has invaded the United States, whereupon they face the consequences of their failures to support the government in fighting Communism. Short: An educational short showing a typical dinner at home for a rigidly polite suburban family.
122	3	The Dead Talk Back; With short: The Selling Wizard	Produced 1957/Released 1993, B&W, Headliner Productions/Sinister Cinema, USA	July 30, 1994
A paranormal researcher living in a rooming house claims that he has invented a radio capable of allowing contact with the dead. When one of the house's residents ends up killed, he uses the radio to aid in the police's investigation. Note: An educational short that showcases grocery store refrigeration units.
123	4	Colossus and the Headhunters (Maciste contro i cacciatori di teste)	1963, Color, AIP/Sinister Cinema, Italy	August 20, 1994
Maciste leads his people from their destroyed island home to a land of warring tribes, then battles headhunting savages who have abducted a king.
124	5	The Creeping Terror	1964, B&W, Crown International, USA	August 27, 1994
A pair of giant slug-like aliens emerge from a spaceship and go on a rampage, catching and swallowing many people.
125	6	Bloodlust! With short: Uncle Jim's Dairy Farm	1961, B&W, Crown International, USA	September 3, 1994
After their boat breaks down, a band of college kids end up stranded on the island estate of a mad hunter who aches to kill them and add their bodies to his trophy collection. Short: An educational short where a pair of city kids spend their summer at a dairy farm. Note: First appearance of Mary Jo Pehl as Pearl Forrester
126	7	Code Name: Diamond Head; With short: A Day at the Fair	1977, Color (TV) (NBC), Quinn Martin/Worldvision, USA	September 17, 1994
An undercover agent in Hawaii is sent to find a traitorous agent and stop them before they can sell a deadly biological weapon. Short: An educational short that follows a farm family at their local county fair.
127	8	The Skydivers; With short: Why Study Industrial Arts?	1963, B&W, Crown International, USA	October 1, 1994
In a small California town, a married couple run a skydiving school at a tiny airfield. When the husband rebukes his old girlfriend, she hooks up with his fired mechanic to seek revenge. Short: An educational short that shows why boys should take industrial arts classes.
128	9	The Violent Years; With short: Young Man's Fancy	1956, B&W, Headliner Productions/Wade Williams, USA	October 8, 1994
A cynical and nihilistic teenage girl is neglected by her idle rich parents, so she rounds up a band of fellow delinquent girls to go on a violent crime spree. Short: A documentary short sponsored by the Edison Electric Institute, where a suburban family's typical day, and how their chores are made easier with their electrical appliances, is demonstrated.
129	10	Last of the Wild Horses	1948, B&W, Lippert/Weiss Global, USA	October 15, 1994
A cowboy finds himself caught in a range war between a rancher and his neighbors, and along the way tries to stop some cattle rustlers and gets framed for murder.
130	11	The Starfighters	1964, Color, Riviera, USA	October 29, 1994
An Air Force pilot-in-training attempts to join the ranks of the more experienced officers so he can fly the new F-104 jet.
131	12	The Sinister Urge; With short: Keeping Clean and Neat	1960, B&W, Headliner/Wade Williams, USA	November 5, 1994
A crew of police detectives investigate a murder they suspect is related to a secret pornography ring, then try to find the head of the operation and have it shut down. Short: An educational short that encourages children to pay close attention to their fashion and hygiene.
132	13	San Francisco International	1970, Color, Universal, USA	November 19, 1994
The administrators of San Francisco International Airport must deal with several crises threatening the airport, including hijackings, kidnappings, and marital problems.
133	14	Kitten with a Whip	1964, B&W, Universal, USA	November 23, 1994
A soft-hearted Senate candidate finds himself cajoled and blackmailed into helping a young woman who broke out of reform school hide from the police.
134	15	Zombie Nightmare	1987, Color, Gold-Gems/Shapiro-Glickenhaus, Canada	November 24, 1994
A young man killed in a hit-and-run is turned into a zombie by a voodoo practitioner whose life was saved by the man's father. From there, the zombie is commanded to seek bloody revenge on those responsible for his death.
135	16	Racket Girls; With short: Are You Ready for Marriage?	1951, B&W, Globe Roadshows, USA	November 26, 1994
A gym owner who specializes in women's wrestling uses his gym as a front for illegal gambling. Before long, he soon gets into trouble with both the mob and the law. Short: An educational short where a high school couple rushing into marriage see a marriage counselor who talks them out of it.
136	17	The Sword and the Dragon (Ilya Muromets)	1956, Color, Mosfilm, USSR	December 3, 1994
In the 13th century, a band of barbaric Mongols attack Russia, but a valiant warrior rallies his fellow Russians in fighting off the horde.
137	18	High School Big Shot; With short: Out of This World	1959, B&W, Filmgroup, USA	December 10, 1994
A high school loser with an alcoholic deadbeat for a father helps his pretty classmate cheat on an essay for her love. When the pair are found out, the young man then plans a heist to win his crush's favor. Short: An educational short that keeps bread truck drivers on the straight and narrow.
138	19	Red Zone Cuba (Night Train to Mundo Fine); With short: Speech: Platform, Posture, and Appearance	1966, B&W, Hollywood Star/PRO, USA	December 17, 1994
A trio of escaped criminals stumble upon a desolate Army post and take part in the Bay of Pigs Invasion. When they return home, they go in search of ore as a means to strike it rich. Short: An educational short that gives posturing advice for public speakers.
139	20	Danger!! Death Ray (Il raggio infernale)	1967, Color, Leda Films/Meteor Film, Spain/Italy	January 7, 1995
A suave secret agent sets out to recover a stolen experimental laser and the scientist who created it from an evil organization.
140	21	The Beast of Yucca Flats; With shorts: Money Talks! and Progress Island USA	1961, B&W, Crown International/Wade Williams, USA	January 21, 1995
A defecting Russian scientist ends up turning into a monster when he is caught in an atomic explosion. He then wanders around the test range and the surrounding town, killing various people. Shorts: An educational short promoting the importance of a budget; a travelogue meant to lure investors to then-modern Puerto Rico.
141	22	Angels Revenge (Angels' Brigade)	1979, Color, Arista/INI Entertainment Group, USA	March 11, 1995
A Las Vegas pop singer discovers that her brother was severely beaten while high on illegal drugs. This prompts her, her brother's teacher, and five other women to form a paramilitary vigilante squad to stop the drug cartel responsible from selling more drugs to kids.
142	23	The Amazing Transparent Man; With short: The Days of Our Years	1960, B&W, AIP/Orion, USA	March 18, 1995
A disgruntled military official and his scientist accomplice give an escaped convict the power of invisibility. Though the scientist intends for the ex-con to steal radioactive material for him, he instead uses his power to rob banks, drawing the scientist's ire and the police's attention. Short: A Union Pacific Railroad-sponsored safety film where a minister urges railroad workers to be more careful while on the job, to prevent injuries.
143	24	Samson vs. the Vampire Women (Santo vs. las Mujeres Vampiro)	1962, B&W, AIP-TV/K. Gordon Murray, Mexico	March 25, 1995
Masked luchador El Santo battles a coven of vampires who want to capture a young woman they intend to make their queen. Note: Frank Conniff's last episode as a series regular.

=== Season 7 (1995–96) ===
No. overall	No. in season	Film	Film details	Original release date
144	1	Night of the Blood Beast; With short: Once Upon a Honeymoon	1958, B&W, AIP/Orion, USA	November 23, 1995 (701T); February 3, 1996 (701)
An astronaut survives the crash landing of his capsule, but he soon learns that he's pregnant with alien embryos. Short: A musical short where a woman dreams of redecorating her house, with help from a guardian angel. Note: An alternate version of this episode, featuring Thanksgiving-themed host segments, premiered during the "Turkey Day" marathon on November 23, 1995. The primary version of the episode was broadcast on February 3, 1996. The riffing on the short and film is the same in both versions of the episode. First episode with Pearl Forrester as a regular character.
145	2	The Brute Man; With short: The Chicken of Tomorrow	1946, B&W, PRC/Films Around the World, USA	February 10, 1996
A large, strong, disfigured man takes revenge on his old friends from college, who he believes responsible for causing his condition. Short: An educational short that explains and examines chicken farming and the poultry industry.
146	3	Deathstalker and the Warriors from Hell (Deathstalker III: The Warriors from Hell)	1988, Color, Concorde Pictures, USA/Mexico	February 17, 1996
In his third film, the sardonic hero Deathstalker sets off on a quest for three magical stones and battles the evil sorcerer who rules his kingdom.
147	4	The Incredible Melting Man	1977, Color, AIP/Orion, USA	February 24, 1996
An astronaut is exposed to a radioactive blast when in orbit around Saturn. When he returns to Earth, his body begins melting violently, turning him into a mindless monster that kills and eats people to slow the melting. It's up to the astronaut's best friend, an Army general, and the local sheriff to find and stop him while keeping the incident a secret.
148	5	Escape 2000 (Fuga dal Bronx)	1983, Color, FGH/Filmco Ltd/Hemdale/New Line, Italy	March 2, 1996
A street punk and a band of rebels fight back against an evil corporation that intends to raze and rebuild the Bronx, secretly attempting to kill its obstinate residents should they refuse to cooperate in the forced evacuation. Note: Last episode of the original series to feature viewer letter readings.
149	6	Laserblast	1978, Color, Selected Pictures/Full Moon, USA	May 18, 1996
A troubled teenager discovers a laser weapon left behind by a pair of turtle-like aliens in the middle of the desert. He uses it for petty revenge against the bullies who taunted him, but the weapon slowly changes his appearance and personality. Note: Trace Beaulieu's last episode; Last episode broadcast on Comedy Central.

=== Feature film (1996) ===
Film	Film details	Release Date
This Island Earth	1955, Color, Universal-International, USA	April 19, 1996
An atomic scientist and test pilot ends up collaborating on a mysterious research project run by a group of aliens who need his help to save their dying planet.

=== Season 8 (1997) ===
No. overall	No. in season	Film	Film details	Original release date
150	1	Revenge of the Creature	1955, B&W [3-D], Universal, USA	February 1, 1997
In the first sequel to Creature from the Black Lagoon, the Gill-Man is captured and taken to a Florida aquarium, where he is put on display and studied by scientists. He soon escapes the aquarium and goes after an attractive woman he has become infatuated with. Note: Bill Corbett's first episode as Crow T. Robot. First appearance of Professor Bobo. Pearl Forrester takes over as the lead mad scientist. First episode for the Sci-Fi Channel.
151	2	The Leech Woman	1960, B&W, Universal, USA	February 8, 1997
An alcoholic, middle-aged woman travels to Africa and discovers the secret to a temporarily rejuvenated appearance from a native tribe. She steals the tools used in said ritual and returns to America, where she starts indiscriminately killing men to maintain her youth.
152	3	The Mole People	1956, B&W, Universal, USA	February 15, 1997
A band of archaeologists discover a long-lost underground civilization of Sumerian albinos, as well as bestial human-mole hybrids used as slaves by the Sumerians. Guest appearance: football player Robert Smith, then of the Minnesota Vikings.
153	4	The Deadly Mantis	1957, B&W, Universal, USA	February 22, 1997
An earthquake in the Arctic Circle causes a giant prehistoric praying mantis to awaken from hibernation. The insect soon invades Washington, D.C. and New York City, prompting a band of scientists to stop it.
154	5	The Thing That Couldn't Die	1958, B&W, Universal, USA	March 1, 1997
A family on a dude ranch, with the assistance of their psychic daughter, unearth the 400-year-old severed head of a Satanic warlock in a chest buried under their land. Once the chest is opened, the warlock's head revives and hypnotizes the family in order to have them reunite him with his body. Note: First appearance of Observer (aka "Brain Guy").
155	6	The Undead	1957, B&W, AIP/Teleworld, USA	March 8, 1997
A hypnotist and "psychical researcher" hires a prostitute for an experiment in past-life regression. The experiment is a success, as the prostitute travels back to the 15th century as a woman falsely accused of witchcraft, prompting the researcher to follow her there to prevent her death.
156	7	Terror from the Year 5000	1958, B&W, AIP/Teleworld, USA	March 15, 1997
A scientist creates a time machine which summons a horrifically scarred and constantly screaming woman from the year 5200 A.D.. Hoping to prevent her futuristic world from being a radioactive wasteland where humankind is on the brink of extinction, the woman seeks to find a man to bring with her to the future, killing anyone who stands in her way with her radioactive touch.
157	8	The She-Creature	1956, B&W, AIP/Teleworld, USA	April 5, 1997
A carnival mesmerist uses hypnosis on a young woman to summon the spirit of a prehistoric female sea creature. The creature emerges from the sea and goes on a killing spree, prompting a heroic scientist to stop it.
158	9	I Was a Teenage Werewolf	1957, B&W, AIP/Teleworld, USA	April 19, 1997
A troubled high-schooler with a short fuse is hypnotized into becoming a werewolf after visiting an unethical doctor.
159	10	The Giant Spider Invasion	1975, Color, Cinema Group 75/Atlas International, USA	May 31, 1997
A meteor crashes in rural Wisconsin, laden with the eggs of mutated, otherworldly spiders. The eggs soon hatch, and the hatched spiders terrorize a small town, prompting law enforcement officials and scientists to stop them.
160	11	Parts: The Clonus Horror	1979, Color, Clonus Associates/Atlas International, USA	June 7, 1997
A facility housed in an isolated desert community has been creating and breeding human clones to serve as a source of replacement organs for the wealthy and powerful elite of the country. One of the clones gains self-awareness and seeks to reveal the truth of his existence to the world.
161	12	The Incredibly Strange Creatures Who Stopped Living and Became Mixed-Up Zombies	1964, Color, Fairway/PRO, USA	June 14, 1997
A pair of slackers journey to a boardwalk carnival and stumble across a cult of monsters that operates from within the local fortune teller's tent.
162	13	Jack Frost (Morozko)	1965, Color, Gorky Film Studios/Corinth Films, USSR	July 12, 1997
A young girl is forced to slave away by her wicked stepmother, and an arrogant young man who wishes to become her boyfriend is given the head of a bear by a mushroom-like sprite as punishment; he must perform a good deed to reverse his curse. Note: Jim Mallon's last episode as Gypsy.
163	14	Riding with Death (Gemini Man: "Smithereens" and "Buffalo Bill Rides Again")	1976, Color, Universal TV, USA, Rated R	July 19, 1997
Two edited-together episodes of the short-lived TV series Gemini Man. A government agent who can turn invisible at will for a short time sets off to safeguard a super fuel additive, then takes on a saboteur.
164	15	Agent for H.A.R.M.	1966, Color, Universal, USA	August 2, 1997
An American spy is assigned with protecting a defecting Soviet scientist from agents of the KGB, and falls in love with his niece in the process. Note: Patrick Brantseg's first episode as Gypsy.
165	16	Prince of Space (Yūsei Ōji)	1959, B&W, Toei Company/Walter Manley Enterprises/Teleworld, Japan	August 16, 1997
A race of chicken-like aliens invade Japan, prompting interstellar superhero Prince of Space to save the day.
166	17	The Horror of Party Beach	1964, B&W, 20th Century Fox/Rainbow Media, USA	September 6, 1997
Toxic waste illegally dumped in the ocean turns the skeletal crew of a sunken ship into a group of murderous plant/fish monsters. The creatures soon crawl out of the sea and attack a beachside community, forcing a teenage girl, her boyfriend, and her scientist father to stop them.
167	18	Devil Doll	1964, B&W, Associated Film Distributors, UK	October 4, 1997
A ventriloquist is able to use hypnosis to transfer a person's soul into his dummy. The soul already housed within the dummy desires to get revenge for his imprisonment.
168	19	Invasion of the Neptune Men (Uchū Kaisokusen)	1961, B&W, Toei Company/Walter Manley Enterprises/Teleworld, Japan	October 11, 1997
Robotic aliens from the planet Neptune attack Japan, and it's up to an interstellar superhero who flies a rocket-car to stop them.
169	20	Space Mutiny	1988, Color, Action International Pictures, South Africa	November 8, 1997
A space pilot and the commander of a spaceship work together to stop the ship's treacherous security chief when he instigates a mutiny.
170	21	Time Chasers (Tangents)	1994, Color, Edgewood Studios, USA, Rated PG	November 22, 1997
A small town physics professor and inventor creates a light plane modified with special technology that allows it to travel through time. When the technology is stolen by a greedy and villainous CEO, the inventor chases after him throughout the timestream to stop him from destroying the future.
171	22	Overdrawn at the Memory Bank	1983, Color (Video), RSL Productions, Canada/USA	December 6, 1997
In an Orwellian future, a corporate drone has started watching forbidden films hidden inside the computer servers during his working hours. Eventually, he manages to project a rendition of Casablanca, his favorite film, and ends up leading a revolution against the CEO of his company while inside the master computer that controls the world.

=== Season 9 (1998) ===
No. overall	No. in season	Film	Film details	Original release date
172	1	The Projected Man	1966, Color, Universal, UK	March 14, 1998
A scientist invents a teleporting machine, but it is later sabotaged. To prove that it works, he attempts to teleport himself, but the attempt ends with the scientist horribly mutating himself, granting him the ability to kill anything he touches with his mutated hand.
173	2	The Phantom Planet	1961, B&W, AIP/MGM, USA	March 21, 1998
An astronaut crash lands on an asteroid populated by a race of tiny aliens. He is shrunken to their size and imprisoned by them, where he learns where they are at war with another, highly aggressive alien race.
174	3	The Pumaman (L'uomo puma)	1980, Color, ADM Films/Video Voice, Italy	April 4, 1998
A mild-mannered university professor learns that he was born with special powers, and is foretold to become the superhero "Puma Man". As he settles into his new role, the professor fights a mad scientist who attempts to use an ancient mind-control mask to rule the world.
175	4	Werewolf (Arizona Werewolf)	1997, Color, Tozart Publishing, USA	April 18, 1998
Archeologists unearth a strange canine skeleton on ancient Native American land. When some of these men accidentally cut themselves on the skeleton, they gradually transform into werewolves.
176	5	The Deadly Bees	1966, Color, Amicus/Paramount, UK	May 9, 1998
A young British pop star collapses from exhaustion during a TV appearance and is sent on a mandatory vacation to the remote Seagull Island. She learns that her host and his neighbor are beekeepers engrossed in an ongoing feud. When she gets involved soon after, the locals of Seagull Island start dying from being attacked by bee swarms.
177	6	The Space Children; With short: Century 21 Calling	1958, B&W, Paramount, USA	June 13, 1998
In a seaside town, the children of a group of technicians working on an experimental rocket come into contact with a blob-like alien. The blob controls the children's minds, and under its influence, they sabotage the launch of their parents' rocket. Short: A Bell Company-sponsored short set at the 1962 World's Fair, at which then-futuristic telephone innovations are discussed and demonstrated.
178	7	Hobgoblins	1988, Color, Rick Sloane Productions, USA	June 27, 1998
Five rambunctious teenagers run afoul of a band of aliens that escaped from the vault of a failing movie studio, who try to kill the teens by bringing their deepest fantasies to life.
179	8	The Touch of Satan	1971, Color, Futurama/Dundee/PRO, USA	July 11, 1998
A young man gets lost while driving, and soon becomes the guest of a rural family, which includes a hostile old woman and a young woman who turns out to be a witch after selling her soul to Satan. Note: Host segments feature prop diva Beth 'beez' McKeever as Steffi the babysitter.
180	9	Gorgo	1961, Color, MGM/Gold Key, UK	July 18, 1998
A baby prehistoric sea monster appears off the coast of Ireland, where it is soon captured and displayed in a circus. When the circus travels to London, the creature's mother follows it, devastating the city. Guest appearance: Leonard Maltin
181	10	The Final Sacrifice (Quest for the Lost City)	1990, Color, Flying Dutchman/AIP Home Video, Canada	July 25, 1998
A teenager follows a map left by his long-dead father to look for him. In the process, he runs afoul of a Satanic cult, and teams up with a beer-guzzling drifter to stop them.
182	11	Devil Fish (Shark rosso nell'oceano)	1984, Color, Filmes Internationale-Nuovo/Trimark, Italy	August 15, 1998
A group of scientists in Florida discover a monstrous sea creature resembling an octopus and a shark that was created in a science lab, and seek to stop it before it kills people.
183	12	The Screaming Skull; With short: Robot Rumpus	1958, B&W, AIP/MGM, USA	August 29, 1998
A newly-married wife starts seeing a skull throughout her new home. She wonders if the skull is a ghostly apparition of her husband's dead first wife, hallucinations from her nervous condition, or something else entirely. Short: Gumby programs robots to do the yard work for him and Pokey, with disastrous results.
184	13	Quest of the Delta Knights	1993, Color, Ramsway JC, USA	September 26, 1998
During the early Renaissance, a young boy comes under the protection of a kindly beggar, who is soon killed by the malevolent ruler of their kingdom. To this end, he seeks out the Delta Knights, an underground movement dedicated to overthrowing the ruler, by seeking out a trove of magic inventions before said ruler can use them to conquer the world.

=== Season 10 (1999) ===
No. overall	No. in season	Film	Film details	Original release date
185	1	Soultaker	1990, Color, Pacific West Entertainment/Victory Pictures/AIP Home Video, USA, Rated R	April 11, 1999
A group of teenagers are fatally injured in a car accident, and their souls soon meet a "Soultaker" that desires to take them to the afterlife. They must then elude the Soultaker and return to their bodies before time runs out. Guest appearances: Joel Hodgson and Frank Conniff appear in the host segments.
186	2	Girl in Gold Boots	1968, released 1969, Color, Geneni Film Distributors/PRO, USA, Rated R	April 18, 1999
A young woman from rural California travels to Los Angeles and starts working as a go-go dancer. She meets a young man with a guitar and a knack for music, and soon gets involved with drug dealers.
187	3^{[2]}	Merlin's Shop of Mystical Wonders	1996, filmed 1984 & 1995, Color, Berton Films/Santelmo Productions, USA	September 12, 1999
Through a series of flashbacks, a grandfather tells two contemporary stories featuring the legendary wizard Merlin to his young grandson. One story features a husband who hasn't been able to conceive a child with his wife finding a book of spells that changes his personality. The other story features a demonic toy monkey that causes any living thing in sight to die when it bangs its cymbals together, prompting a young boy's father to get rid of it before it kills his son.
188	4	Future War	1994, released 1997, Color, Cine Excel Entertainment/Silver Screen International, USA	April 25, 1999
In a distant future, an evil race of alien cyborgs have been breeding humans to use as slaves. One slave manages to escape to contemporary Los Angeles, where he is hunted by cybernetically-enhanced dinosaurs that the cyborgs use as trackers.
189	5	Blood Waters of Dr. Z (Zaat)	1971, released 1982, Color, Barton Films, USA	May 2, 1999
In Florida, a demented scientist turns himself into a catfish monster and attacks those who wronged him, prompting the local authorities to follow his trail.
190	6	Boggy Creek II: And the Legend Continues (The Barbaric Beast of Boggy Creek, Part II)	1984, released 1985; Color, Howco International Pictures/PRO, USA, Rated PG	May 9, 1999
In rural Arkansas, a college professor and his students go camping in the hopes of finding a Bigfoot-like cryptid rumored to wander the swamps.
191	7	Track of the Moon Beast	1976, Color, Lizard Productions, USA, Rated PG	June 13, 1999
In New Mexico, a mineralogist is struck in the head by a small meteor, which is left indented on his forehead. When the moon becomes full, he transforms into a mindless lizard monster and goes on a killing spree.
192	8	Final Justice	1985, Color, Arista Films/INI Entertainment, USA/Italy, Rated R	June 20, 1999
A Texas deputy travels to Malta to kill the criminal who killed his partner, and doesn't let the American or Maltese authorities stop him.
193	9	Hamlet (Hamlet, Prinz von Dänemark)	1961, B&W, PRO, German TV	June 27, 1999
A German television production of Shakespeare's famous play.
194	10	It Lives By Night (The Bat People)	1974, Color, AIP/MGM, USA, Rated PG	July 18, 1999
A vacationing scientist is bitten by a bat, then turns into a humanoid bat monster and goes on a killing spree.
195	11	Horrors of Spider Island (Ein Toter hing im Netz)	1960, B&W, Rapid-Intercontinental, West Germany	July 25, 1999
An all-girl dance troupe and their manager survive the crash landing of their plane, but find themselves stranded on an island inhabited by a giant mutated spider.
196	12	Squirm; With short: A Case of Spring Fever	1976, Color, AIP/MGM, USA, Rated R/1940, B&W, Jam Handy, USA	August 1, 1999
A colony of earthworms are given intelligence and an appetite for flesh after being electrically supercharged. The worms soon make their way to a remote Georgia town, attacking the residents and prompting them to fight back. Short: An educational short where a hapless man wishes springs didn't exist, which is granted by a magical creature who aims to teach him a lesson.
197	13	Diabolik (Danger: Diabolik)	1968, Color, Paramount, Italy/France, Rated PG-13	August 8, 1999
Skilled thief Diabolik performs a series of daring heists, such as $10 million in cash and an 11-emerald necklace, then sets his sights on a shipment carrying twenty tons of gold melted into a giant ingot. Note: Final episode of the original series. Michael J. Nelson, Kevin Murphy, Bill Corbett, Mary Jo Pehl, and Patrick Brantseg's final episode as series regulars.

=== Season 11 (2017) ===
The fan-funded eleventh season of the series is listed by Netflix as Mystery Science Theater 3000: The Return.

No. overall	No. in season	Film	Film details	Original release date
198	1	Reptilicus	1961, Color, Saga Studios, Denmark	April 14, 2017
In Copenhagen, a group of miners discover the frozen tail of a giant reptile. When the tail is allowed to thaw, it regenerates into a monster which proceeds to wreak havoc. Notes: First episode for Netflix, with first appearances of Jonah Ray as Jonah Heston, Felicia Day as Kinga Forrester, and Patton Oswalt as Max. First episode with Hampton Yount as Crow T. Robot, Baron Vaughn as Tom Servo, and Rebecca Hanson as Gypsy. Features a song composed by Paul and Storm. Guest appearances: Wil Wheaton and Erin Gray
199	2	Cry Wilderness	1987, Color, Visto International, USA, Rated PG	April 14, 2017
A young boy tries to protect his father from a prophesied danger while also hiding Bigfoot, who befriends him, from a poacher. Guest appearances: Mary Jo Pehl as Pearl Forrester, Bill Corbett as Observer, and Kevin Murphy as Professor Bobo
200	3	The Time Travelers	1964, Color, AIP, USA	April 14, 2017
A group of scientists step into a time portal and end up stranded in the year 2071, where the Earth is a post-apocalyptic wasteland. Guest appearances: Elliott Kalan and Joel Hodgson
201	4	Avalanche	1978, Color, New World Pictures, USA, Rated PG	April 14, 2017
Vacationers in the Rocky Mountains find themselves trapped following an avalanche, and must find a way to survive the unforgiving cold and escape. Guest appearance: Neil Patrick Harris
202	5	The Beast of Hollow Mountain	1956, Color, United Artists, USA	April 14, 2017
An American rancher in Mexico falls in love with an engaged woman, fights her jealous fiancé, and confronts a mysterious creature that's been preying on local cattle.
203	6	Starcrash	1978, Color, New World Pictures, USA	April 14, 2017
A team of heroes led by an alleged criminal begin a trek across the galaxy to find and prevent the use of an apocalyptic weapon. Guest appearance: Jerry Seinfeld
204	7	The Land That Time Forgot	1974, Color, AIP, UK/USA, Rated PG	April 14, 2017
During World War I, British and U.S. POWs take over a German U-boat and accidentally steer it toward a mysterious, uncharted land teeming with prehistoric life.
205	8	The Loves of Hercules	1960, Color, Grandi Schermi Italiani, Italy/France	April 14, 2017
After his wife is murdered, Hercules goes on a series of adventures to avenge her.
206	9	Yongary, Monster from the Deep	1967, Color, AIP, South Korea, Rated PG	April 14, 2017
A bomb awakens the giant monster Yongary, which proceeds to attack Seoul.
207	10	Wizards of the Lost Kingdom	1985, Color, Trinity Productions, Argentina/USA, Rated PG	April 14, 2017
The son of a royal wizard joins forces with a vagabond swordsman to reclaim his home from an evil sorcerer.
208	11	Wizards of the Lost Kingdom II	1989, Color, Concorde Pictures, Argentina/USA, Rated PG	April 14, 2017
A teenage boy with magical powers is told that only he can restore peace to three kingdoms, after they are all overtaken by evil lords. Guest appearances: Mary Jo Pehl as Pearl Forrester, Bill Corbett as Observer, and Kevin Murphy as Professor Bobo
209	12	Carnival Magic	1983, Color, Krypton Productions, USA, Rated G	April 14, 2017
A talented magician and his talking chimpanzee help to save a small-time traveling carnival from going bankrupt. Guest appearance: Mark Hamill
210	13	The Christmas That Almost Wasn't	1966, Color, Childhood Productions, Inc., USA/Italy, Rated G	April 14, 2017
A villainous scoundrel attempts to stop Santa Claus from delivering presents by threatening to evict him from the North Pole, but Santa gains the help of a caring lawyer to circumvent the villain's demands. Guest appearances: Elliott Kalan and Joel Hodgson
211	14	At the Earth's Core	1976, Color, AIP/British Lion Films, UK/USA, Rated PG	April 14, 2017
Two scientists develop a drilling machine to bore through a mountain, but they inadvertently go off course and dig into an uncharted world near the Earth's core. Guest appearances: Mary Jo Pehl as Pearl Forrester, Bill Corbett as Observer, Kevin Murphy as Professor Bobo, Joel McHale, and Paul Chaplin

=== Season 12 (2018) ===
The twelfth season, consisting of six episodes, was released on Netflix on November 22, 2018. The season is presented as Mystery Science Theater 3000: The Gauntlet.

No. overall	No. in season	Film	Film details	Original release date
212	1	Mac and Me	1988, Color, New Star Entertainment, United States, Rated PG	November 22, 2018
A wheelchair-bound boy, along with his family and friends, try to protect an alien creature named "Mac" and its family, who have accidentally been brought to Earth.
213	2	Atlantic Rim	2013, Color, The Asylum, United States	November 22, 2018
A squad of giant mecha fight off sea monsters that are attacking the east coast of the United States.
214	3	Lords of the Deep	1989, Color, Concorde Pictures, United States, Rated PG-13	November 22, 2018
A group of scientists studying underwater habitation suffer several losses after an undersea earthquake agitates a swarm of stingray-like creatures.
215	4	The Day Time Ended	1979, Color, Compass International Pictures, United States, Rated PG	November 22, 2018
An extended family living in the desert have numerous encounters with alien creatures and time travel. Guest appearance: J. Elvis Weinstein as Dr. Laurence Erhardt
216	5	Killer Fish	1979, Color, Fawcett-Majors Productions, Italy/France/Brazil, Rated PG	November 22, 2018
A jewel heist goes awry when a tornado strikes the area and causes a flash flood, trapping the thieves in waters filled with deadly piranha.
217	6	Ator, the Fighting Eagle	1982, Color, Filmarage, Italy, Rated PG	November 22, 2018
The warrior Ator aches to rescue his lover from a spider-worshipping cult. Guest appearance: J. Elvis Weinstein as Dr. Laurence Erhardt

=== Season 13 (2022) ===
Season 13 consisted of thirteen episodes backed by a dedicated Kickstarter campaign. One of the selected films, The Million Eyes of Sumuru, had been previously riffed during the show's original KTMA season (albeit in an edited-for-content version). Episodes were released periodically throughout 2022, culminating with a December holiday special and season finale. The first three episodes were available in pre-release form to backers as tests of the Gizmoplex platform, then distributed in their full form beginning in May.

No. overall	No. in season	Film	Film details	Original release date
218	1	Santo in the Treasure of Dracula	1969, Color, Cinematográfica Calderón S.A., Mexico	March 4, 2022 (pre-release); May 6, 2022 (public)
Mexican wrestler El Santo develops a time machine and learns of the treasure of Count Dracula, then works to prevent a rival scientist from stealing it.
219	2	Robot Wars	1993, Color, Full Moon Entertainment, USA, Rated PG	April 1, 2022 (pre-release); May 7, 2022 (public)
A hotshot mech pilot in the post-apocalyptic future of 2041 battles bandits and spies while working to stop a band of hijackers from provoking global war.
220	3	Beyond Atlantis	1973, Color, Dimension Pictures, Philippines/USA, Rated PG	April 29, 2022 (pre-release); May 8, 2022 (public)
A band of adventurous rogues travel to a tropical island to nab a reported fortune in pearls, while the islanders are just as determined to keep their sacred treasure. Note: Emily Marsh's first episode as Emily Connor
221	4	Munchie	1992, Color, New Concord, USA, Rated PG	May 27, 2022
A daydreamer who is bullied at his new school and whose mom is about to marry a scoundrel stumbles upon Munchie, a friendly and mischievous gremlin-like creature that has magic powers and wants to be his friend.
222	5	Doctor Mordrid	1992, Color, Full Moon Entertainment, USA, Rated R	June 10, 2022
An unspeakable evil enters the world and desires to rule Earth, and only the mysterious sorcerer known as Doctor Mordrid can stop it.
223	6	Demon Squad	2019, Color, Wild Eye Releasing, USA	June 24, 2022
A paranormal investigator hunting for an ancient talisman is thrust into a hidden world of supernatural beings as he battles for the object's ownership.
224	7	Gamera vs. Jiger	1970, Color, Daiei Film Co. Ltd., Japan	July 22, 2022
When an ancient statue is moved for display, the giant, vaguely Triceratops-like monster Jiger is released. The creature travels to Japan in pursuit of the statue, and ends up battling Gamera as a family watches.
225	8	The Batwoman	1967, Color, Cinematográfica Calderón S.A., Mexico	August 19, 2022
Crimefighting wrestler Batwoman is called to stop a demented scientist from using the pineal fluid of captured wrestlers to create a race of fish-men.
226	9	The Million Eyes of Sumuru	1967, Color, Warner-Pathe/American International Pictures, UK	September 2, 2022
Two CIA agents in Hong Kong investigate the leader of an all-female army that is bent on world domination.
227	10	H. G. Wells' The Shape of Things to Come	1979, Color, International Film Distributors/Film Ventures International, Canada, Rated PG	September 30, 2022
In a future where Earth has become uninhabitable, humankind has set up colonies on the Moon. A madman decides to destroy these colonies with his army of robots and automated ships, and only three people and their own robot can stop him.
228	11	The Mask	1961, B&W [3-D], Warner Bros., Canada	October 28, 2022
A young archaeologist believes that he has been cursed by an ancient mask that causes him to have weird nightmares and possibly commit murder. He mails the mask to his psychiatrist, who is soon plunged into the nightmarish world it leads to.
229	12	The Bubble	1966, Color, Arch Oboler Productions, USA, Rated PG	November 11, 2022
A pregnant woman and her husband land their airplane in a remote town, where the inhabitants appear to come from several different eras and repeat the same movements and sentences over and over. As the mystery unfolds, the couple find themselves trapped in this village and searching for an escape.
230	13	The Christmas Dragon	2014, Color, Highland Film Group, USA	December 16, 2022
A group of orphans in a fantasy kingdom embark on a journey to save Christmas, saving the life of a suffering dragon along the way.

=== Season 14 (2026) ===
Dubbed The RiffTrax Experiments, this season stars the show's Sci-Fi Channel-era cast. The first installment debuted in theaters through Fathom Entertainment on September 9 and 13, 2026. The third episode initially had a limited release to RiffTrax subscribers. The fourth episode features a guest appearance by the show's Comedy Central-era Mads, Dr. Forrester and TV's Frank.

No. overall	No. in season	Film	Film details	Original release date
231	1	Sting of Death	1966, Color, Essen Productions Inc., United States	September 9, 2026
A disgruntled marine station assistant transforms himself into a mutant jellyfish monster using a secret laboratory machine, intending to get revenge on the rude college students and tourists who mocked him.
232	2	Deathsport; With short: Personal Hygiene for Boys	1978, Color, New World Pictures, United States	October 22, 2026
In a post-apocalyptic future, two warriors are forced to ride armed motorcycles in a deadly gladiatorial arena. They must then escape the tournament and team up with local rebels to defeat a corrupt warlord threatening the remaining free settlements. Short: An educational short from 1971 about the importance of male personal hygiene.
233	3	The Mummy Theme Park	2000, Color, Production Film 82, Italy	October 29, 2026
A wicked sorceress releases an ancient Egyptian curse when a money-hungry Sheik turns an excavated pharaoh's tomb into an underground theme park.
234	4	Space Raiders; With short: The Monkey and the Organ Grinder	1983, Color, New World Pictures, United States	November 19, 2026
A band of space pirates accidentally abduct a young boy when he stows away on the cargo ship they have just stolen. The crew's leader promises to return him safely home, after he joins them on an adventurous journey while fleeing from a ruthless corporate empire and pursuing bounty hunters. Short: A 1955 educational short follows a monkey while his owner takes a nap. Guest appearances: Trace Beaulieu as Dr. Clayton Forrester and Frank Conniff as TV's Frank

== See also ==
- List of Mystery Science Theater 3000 home video releases
- The Film Crew
- RiffTrax
- Cinematic Titanic

== Notes ==
1. Episode 104 was both the last episode of Season 1 to be produced and to air. Despite this, it was given the lower production number.
2. Due to issues with the movie rights, Episode 1003 debuted a month after the series finale first aired.
