= List of Mystery Science Theater 3000 home video releases =

Mystery Science Theater 3000 is an American TV show which aired between 1988 and 1999, and began a new series in 2017. This page summarizes video tape and DVD releases of episodes of the show. Episodes were initially released by Rhino Entertainment, with the rights later being purchased by Shout! Factory. Releases usually consist of boxsets of 4 episodes, although early releases consisted of just single episodes.

As of November 2017, 166 of the series' 176 nationally broadcast episodes from the original series were released on home video, with the remaining unreleased episodes' host segments released separately due to licensing issues for the movies featured in them.

Any commercial release listed in grey indicates it is no longer in print from their respective company (Best Brains' mailing catalogue for their VHS tapes and DVDs, transferred to Mst3k.com, Rhino's VHS tapes and DVDs from their official website, and Shout! Factory's DVDs from their official website). Items listed in pink are re-releases from Shout! Factory of various material.

Item discontinued and no longer in print
Re-release of an episode/item

== VHS releases ==
Rhino Home Video released several episodes from the Comedy Channel and Comedy Central eras on VHS from April 1996 to January 2001. As of 2004, all of the tapes are out of print, but all episodes originally released on home video have been released on DVD, either as a single or part of a volume pack except for 309 – The Amazing Colossal Man due to licensing issues with the original movie.

Best Brains produced VHS tapes for independent sale through their info club newsletters. As of 2007, all of the tapes are out of print, but most of the tapes' material has been released as bonus features on DVD releases.

A listing of video tapes released is listed below.

=== Best Brains ===
VHS Title	Episode/Special	Released
Play MST for Me	Songs from the show	Holiday 1991
Play MST for Me 2	Songs from the show	Spring 1994
Poopie!	A blooper reel, featuring skits from Seasons 2-6.	Spring 1995
The MST Scrapbook	A diary of MST3K from the KTMA pilot to Season 6	Spring 1995
Poopie! II	A second blooper reel, featuring skits from Seasons 7-8.	Holiday 1997
Tom Servo's All Time Favorite Host Segments	Notable live-action skits from the show's history	Spring 1998
Tom Servo's All Time Favorite Host Segments Vol. II	Notable live-action skits from the show's history	1998
Tom Servo's All Time Favorite Host Segments Vol. III	Notable live-action skits from the show's history	Spring 1999
Tom Servo's All Time Favorite Host Segments Vol. IV	Notable live-action skits from the show's history	Holiday 1999
The Last Dance – Raw	A behind-the-scenes look at the production of the series' final episode	Holiday 1999
Mr. B's Lost Shorts??!!	A collection of shorts from the Comedy Central era	Spring 2000
Tom Servo's All Time Favorite Host Segments Vol. V	Notable live-action skits from the show's history	Spring 2000
Play MST for Me 3	Songs from the show	Holiday 2000
Assignment Venezuela and Other Shorts	A collection of shorts from the Sci-Fi Channel era, as well as an unaired short produced for an ultimately cancelled CD-ROM project; Assignment: Venezuela	Spring 2001
Boggy Creek II	Full episode featuring Boggy Creek II: And the Legend Continues	Holiday 2001
Girl in Gold Boots	Full episode featuring Girl in Gold Boots	Holiday 2001
The Touch of Satan	Full episode featuring The Touch of Satan	Holiday 2001
Hamlet	Full episode featuring a 1961 German televised production of Hamlet	Holiday 2001

=== Rhino ===
VHS Title	Episode/Special	Released
Cave Dwellers	301 – Cave Dwellers	April 30, 1996
Mitchell	512 – Mitchell	April 30, 1996
The Amazing Colossal Man	309 – The Amazing Colossal Man	April 30, 1996
Pod People	303 – Pod People	October 1, 1996
The Brain that Wouldn't Die	513 – The Brain that Wouldn't Die	October 1, 1996
The Unearthly	320 – The Unearthly	August 26, 1997
Eegah	506 – Eegah	August 26, 1997
Red Zone Cuba	619 – Red Zone Cuba	October 21, 1997
I Accuse My Parents	507 – I Accuse My Parents	October 21, 1997
The Atomic Brain	518 – The Atomic Brain	October 21, 1997
Gunslinger	511 – Gunslinger	February 17, 1998
Manos: The Hands of Fate	424 – Manos: The Hands of Fate	February 17, 1998
Poopie!	The first MST Poopie tape, re-released by Rhino	February 17, 1998
Angels Revenge	622 – Angels Revenge	July 21, 1998
Shorts Vol. 1	The first MST Shorts tape	July 21, 1998
The Crawling Hand	106 – The Crawling Hand	March 16, 1999
The Wild, Wild World of Batwoman	515 – The Wild, Wild World of Batwoman	March 16, 1999
Beginning of the End	517 – Beginning of the End	March 16, 1999
Catalina Caper	204 – Catalina Caper	October 1, 1999
The Skydivers	609 – The Skydivers	October 1, 1999
Shorts Vol. 2	The second MST Shorts tape	October 1, 1999
The Sidehackers	202 – The Sidehackers	March 21, 2000
The Creeping Terror	606 – The Creeping Terror	March 21, 2000
Bloodlust	607 – Bloodlust	March 21, 2000
The Hellcats	209 – The Hellcats	January 30, 2001
Shorts Vol. 3	The third MST Shorts tape	January 30, 2001

=== Shout! Factory ===
VHS Title	Episode/Special	Released
Reptilicus (Kickstarter reward)	1101 – Reptilicus	November, 2017

== DVD releases ==
=== Rhino ===
Beginning in March 2000, Rhino started to release episodes of MST3K on DVD.

One MST3K volume pack (Volume 10) was discontinued two months after its initial release, due to licensing issues with Godzilla vs. Megalon. The volume pack was reissued by Rhino as Volume 10.2, with a new episode (The Giant Gila Monster) in its place.

As of 2010, all Rhino releases have been discontinued, due to the company no longer having the rights to distribute MST3K on home video.

A complete listing of releases is shown in the table below.

DVD title	Episodes	Extras
The Brain That Wouldn't Die (Released March 21, 2000)	513 – The Brain That Wouldn't Die	Uncut version of the movie
Eegah (Released March 21, 2000)	506 – Eegah	Uncut version of the movie
The Wild World of Batwoman (Released January 30, 2001)	515 – The Wild World of Batwoman (with short: Cheating)	Uncut version of the movie
Beginning of the End (Released January 30, 2001)	517 – Beginning of the End	Uncut version of the movie
Manos: The Hands of Fate (Released November 20, 2001)	424 – Manos: The Hands of Fate (with short: Hired!, Part 2)	The original MST3K Poopie! blooper reel.
Mitchell (Released November 20, 2001)	512 – Mitchell	The movie's trailer
I Accuse My Parents (Released March 26, 2002)	507 – I Accuse My Parents (with short: The Truck Farmer)	None
Red Zone Cuba (Released March 26, 2002)	619 – Red Zone Cuba (with short: Speech: Platform, Posture, and Appearance)	None
The Crawling Hand (Released June 11, 2002)	106 – The Crawling Hand	The uncut version of the movie and the theatrical trailer
The Hellcats (Released June 11, 2002)	209 – The Hellcats	The uncut version of the movie and the theatrical trailer
The Mystery Science Theater 3000 Collection, Volume 1 (Released November 12, 2002)	204 – Catalina Caper 606 – The Creeping Terror 607 – Bloodlust! (with short: Uncle Jim's Dairy Farm) 609 – The Skydivers (with short: Why Study Industrial Arts?)	Uncut version of each movie and the theatrical trailer for 204, 607, and 609.
The Mystery Science Theater 3000 Collection, Volume 2 (Released February 11, 2003)	301 – Cave Dwellers 303 – Pod People 622 – Angels Revenge	Mystery Science Theater 3000: The Shorts, Volume 1 (The Home Economics Story, Junior Rodeo Daredevils, Body Care and Grooming, Cheating, A Date with Your Family, Why Study Industrial Arts?, and Chicken of Tomorrow) on Disc 4.
The Mystery Science Theater 3000 Collection, Volume 3 (Released April 8, 2003)	202 – The Sidehackers 320 – The Unearthly (with shorts: Posture Pals and Appreciating Our Parents) 518 – The Atomic Brain (with short: What about Juvenile Delinquency?)	Alternate takes of the host segments on 202, 320, and 518, and Mystery Science Theater 3000: The Shorts, Volume 2 (Catching Trouble, What to Do on a Date, Last Clear Chance, A Day at the Fair, Keeping Clean and Neat, and The Days of Our Years) on Disc 4.
The Mystery Science Theater 3000 Collection, Volume 4 (Released November 18, 2003)	820 – Space Mutiny 822 – Overdrawn at the Memory Bank 1002 – Girl in Gold Boots 1009 – Hamlet	Intros by Mike on all episodes and trailer and TV spot on 1002
The Mystery Science Theater 3000 Collection, Volume 5 (Released March 9, 2004)	1006 – Boggy Creek II: And the Legend Continues 1003 – Merlin's Shop of Mystical Wonders 821 – Time Chasers 908 – The Touch of Satan	Intros by Mike on all episodes, interview with Mike and Kevin on 1003, and trailer for 908
Mystery Science Theater 3000: The Essentials (Released August 31, 2004)	424 – Manos: The Hands of Fate (with short: Hired!, Part 2) 321 – Santa Claus Conquers the Martians	The original MST3K Poopie! blooper reel on 424. A bonus disc featuring Mystery Science Theater 3000 The Shorts, Volume 3 (Speech: Using Your Voice, Aquatic Wizards, Is This Love?, Design for Dreaming, The Selling Wizard, Out of This World, and Once Upon a Honeymoon) was included for people who ordered it through a special web site.
The Mystery Science Theater 3000 Collection, Volume 6 (Released October 26, 2004)	404 – Teenagers from Outer Space 406 – Attack of the Giant Leeches (with short: Undersea Kingdom, Part 1) 511 – Gunslinger	Mr. B's Lost Shorts (Mr. B Natural, X Marks the Spot, Hired! Part 1, Design for Dreaming, Johnny at the Fair, and Are You Ready for Marriage?) on Disc 4.
The Mystery Science Theater 3000 Collection, Volume 7 (Released April 19, 2005)	408 – Hercules Unchained 410 – Hercules Against the Moon Men 816 – Prince of Space 407 – The Killer Shrews (with short: Junior Rodeo Daredevils)	Bonus Shorts: Assignment: Venezuela, Century 21 Calling, and A Case of Spring Fever on 407
The Mystery Science Theater 3000 Collection, Volume 8 (Released November 8, 2005)	907 – Hobgoblins 902 – The Phantom Planet 421 – Monster a Go-Go (with short: Circus on Ice) 603 – The Dead Talk Back (with short: The Selling Wizard)	None
The Mystery Science Theater 3000 Collection, Volume 9 (Released May 16, 2006)	104 – Women of the Prehistoric Planet 207 – Wild Rebels 613 – The Sinister Urge (with short: Keeping Clean and Neat) 812 – The Incredibly Strange Creatures Who Stopped Living and Became Mixed-Up Zombies	Intro by Irene Tsu on 104 and Intro by Conrad Brooks on 613
The Mystery Science Theater 3000 Collection, Volume 10 (Released August 29, 2006)	212 – Godzilla vs. Megalon 503 – Swamp Diamonds (with short: What to Do on a Date) 514 – Teen-Age Strangler (with short: Is This Love?) 810 – The Giant Spider Invasion	Photo Gallery on 212, Poopie! II on 514, and Video Jukebox on 810.
The Mystery Science Theater 3000 Collection, Volume 11 (Released June 26, 2007)	206 – Ring of Terror (with short: The Phantom Creeps, Chapter 3) 409 – Indestructible Man (with short: Undersea Kingdom, Part 2) 414 – Tormented 1011 – Horrors of Spider Island	Original theatrical trailers (for all except 206), Tormented "Reunion" featurette with director Bert I. Gordon and stars Susan Gordon & Joe Turkel, the Mystery Science Theater Hour "Jack Perkins" wraps for 414, Video Jukebox II on 206.
The Mystery Science Theater 3000 Collection, Volume 12 (Released October 30, 2007)	419 – The Rebel Set (with short: Johnny at the Fair) 504 – Secret Agent Super Dragon 612 – The Starfighters 811 – Parts: The Clonus Horror	Original theatrical trailers (for all except 612), Interview with The Rebel Set star Don Sullivan on 419, MST Hour "Jack Perkins" Wraps for 504, Video Jukebox III on 612, interview with Parts: The Clonus Horror director Robert Fiveson on 811.
The Mystery Science Theater 3000 Collection, Volume 10.2 (Released February 5, 2008) (A re-release of Volume 10, with The Giant Gila Monster in place of Godzilla vs. Megalon)	402 – The Giant Gila Monster 503 – Swamp Diamonds (with short: What to Do on a Date) 514 – Teen-Age Strangler (with short: Is This Love?) 810 – The Giant Spider Invasion	Photo Gallery, interview with The Giant Gila Monster star Don Sullivan, two songs by Don Sullivan, "Volume 10.2 Upgrade" sketch featuring Joel Hodgson, Trace Beaulieu, and Frank Conniff on 402, Poopie! II on 514, Video Jukebox on 810.
The Giant Gila Monster (Released February 11, 2008) (Only available to buyers of Volume 10 for a short time)	402 – The Giant Gila Monster	Volume 10.2 Upgrade, interview with actor Don Sullivan, two songs by Don Sullivan, and Photo Gallery.

=== Shout! Factory ===
In January 2008, Best Brains transferred the worldwide home entertainment and digital download license for MST3K from Rhino to Shout! Factory.

DVD title	Episodes	Extras
Mystery Science Theater 3000: 20th Anniversary Edition (Volume XIII) • COLLECTOR'S EDITION Released October 28, 2008 • STANDARD EDITION Released November 18, 2008	211 – First Spaceship on Venus 706 – Laserblast 904 – Werewolf 1004 – Future War	• "History of MST3K" documentary • "Evolution of the MST3K theme song" • Footage from the 2008 San Diego Comic-Con reunion panel • Original theatrical trailers • 4 exclusive mini-posters by artist Steve Vance. • Collector's edition set includes Crow T. Robot figurine.
Mystery Science Theater 3000 – XIV (Released February 3, 2009)	103 – The Mad Monster (with short: Radar Men from the Moon, Part 2) 413 – Manhunt in Space (with short: General Hospital, Part 1) 1001 – Soultaker 1008 – Final Justice	• Interviews with Joe Estevez and Greydon Clark • Mike, Tom and Crow on the ESPN show "Cheap Seats" • Original theatrical trailer for The Mad Monster • 4 exclusive mini-posters by artist Steve Vance.
Mystery Science Theater 3000 – XV (Released July 7, 2009)	102 – The Robot vs. The Aztec Mummy (with short: Radar Men from the Moon, Part 1) 509 – The Girl in Lovers Lane 604 – Zombie Nightmare 616 – Racket Girls (with short: Are You Ready for Marriage?)	• "Glimpses of KTMA: MST3K Scrapbook Scraps I" • "Behind the Scenes: MST3K Scrapbook Scraps II" • New Interviews with Zombie Nightmare stars Frank Dietz and Jon Mikl Thor • Kevin Murphy and Trace Beaulieu in a sneak peek of the upcoming indie feature film Hamlet A.D.D. • Original movie trailers for The Robot vs. The Aztec Mummy and Racket Girls • MST3K promo for The Robot vs. The Aztec Mummy • 4 exclusive mini-posters by artist Steve Vance
Mystery Science Theater 3000 – XVI • COLLECTOR'S EDITION Released December 1, 2009 • STANDARD EDITION Released July 20, 2010	105 – The Corpse Vanishes (with short: Radar Men from the Moon, Part 3) 501 – Warrior of the Lost World 521 – Santa Claus 701 – Night of the Blood Beast (with short: Once Upon a Honeymoon)	• A new interview with Warrior of the Lost World director David Worth • Warrior of the Lost World production stills narrated by David Worth • Santa Claus Conquers the Devil: A 50-Year Retrospective • Santa Claus original radio spot • Santa Claus still gallery • Teaser for Wonder World of K. Gordon Murray in Colorscope • Night of the Blood Beast Comedy Central "Turkey Day Marathon" host segments • "Turkey Day" '95 bumpers • Original theatrical trailers • 4 exclusive mini-posters by artist Steve Vance • Collector's edition set includes Tom Servo figurine.
Mystery Science Theater 3000 – XVII (Released March 16, 2010)	101 – The Crawling Eye 415 – The Beatniks (with short: General Hospital, Part 2) 910 – The Final Sacrifice 1005 – Blood Waters of Dr. Z	• The Crawling Eye special introduction by Joel Hodgson • Mystery Science Theater Hour wraps for The Beatniks • Easter Egg - The Greatest Frank of All from ConventioCon ExpoFest-A-Rama 1994 (On The Beatniks disk but not accessible via the DVD menu) • The Main Event: Crow vs. Crow at DragonCon '09 • Blood Waters of Dr. Z photo gallery • Interview with Bruce J. Mitchell (Zap Rowsdower from The Final Sacrifice) • Original trailers and promos • 4 exclusive mini-posters by artist Steve Vance
Mystery Science Theater 3000 – XVIII (Released July 13, 2010)	208 – Lost Continent 417 – Crash of Moons (with short: General Hospital, Part 3) 621 – The Beast of Yucca Flats (with shorts: Money Talks! and Progress Island USA) 813 – Jack Frost	• New introduction to Lost Continent by Frank Conniff and original theatrical trailer • Mystery Science Theater Hour wraps for Crash of Moons • No Dialogue Necessary: Making an Off-Camera Masterpiece • Coleman Francis: The Cinematic Poet of Parking featurette for The Beast of Yucca Flats • Original theatrical trailer and stills gallery • Introduction to Jack Frost by Kevin Murphy • 4 exclusive mini-posters by artist Steve Vance
Mystery Science Theater 3000 – XIX • COLLECTOR'S EDITION Released November 9, 2010 • STANDARD EDITION Released May 26, 2015	107 – Robot Monster (with shorts: Radar Men from the Moon, Parts 4 & 5) 423 – Bride of the Monster (with short: Hired!, Part 1) 818 – Devil Doll 911 – Devil Fish	• New introduction to Robot Monster by J. Elvis Weinstein • Cult Filmmaker Larry Blamire Geeks Out on Robot Monster • Citizen Wood: Making The Bride, Unmaking The Legend for Bride of the Monster • Inventing the Invention Exchange with Joel Hodgson • The Puppet Master: Richard Gordon on Devil Doll • "MST3K: Origins & Beyond" at CONvergence '09 • Original trailers and promos • 4 exclusive mini-posters by artist Steve Vance • Collector's edition set includes Gypsy figurine.
Beginning of the End (Released February 15, 2011) (Re-release, previously available as a single from Rhino).	517 – Beginning of the End	None
The Incredibly Strange Creatures who Stopped Living and Became Mixed-Up Zombies (Released February 15, 2011) (Re-release, previously available from Rhino in MST3K Volume 9).	812 – The Incredibly Strange Creatures Who Stopped Living and Became Mixed-Up Zombies	None
Mystery Science Theater 3000 – XX (Released March 8, 2011)	109 – Project Moonbase (with shorts: Radar Men from the Moon, Parts 7 & 8) 322 – Master Ninja I 324 – Master Ninja II 505 – The Magic Voyage of Sinbad	• A featurette on the look of MST3K with director of photography Jeff Stonehouse • Introduction to The Magic Voyage of Sinbad by Trace Beaulieu • Mystery Science Theater Hour wraps • A look back at Master Ninja with guest star Bill McKinney • Servo vs. Servo at Dragon Con • Original trailers • 4 Exclusive Mini-Posters By Artist Steve Vance • Orders of the DVD from Shout! Factory's website includes an MST3K globe stress ball.
Gunslinger (Released June 21, 2011) (Re-release, previously available from Rhino in MST3K Volume 6).	511 – Gunslinger	None
Hamlet (Released June 21, 2011) (Re-release, previously available from Rhino in MST3K Volume 4).	1009 – Hamlet	None
Red Zone Cuba (Released August 16, 2011) (Re-release, previously available as a single from Rhino).	619 – Red Zone Cuba (with short: Speech: Platform, Posture, and Appearance)	None
The Unearthly (Released August 16, 2011) (Re-release, previously available from Rhino in MST3K Volume 3).	320 – The Unearthly (with shorts: Posture Pals and Appreciating Our Parents)	None
Manos: The Hands of Fate (Released September 13, 2011) (Re-release, previously available from Rhino as a single and in The Essentials).	424 – Manos: The Hands of Fate (with short: Hired!, Part 2)	• Uncut version of the movie • Interviews with Joel Hodgson, Frank Conniff, Mary Jo Pehl and Trace Beaulieu • MST3K short Hired! Parts 1 & 2 (together for the first time) • Mystery Science Theater Hour wraps • Brand-new Jam Handy and You! featurette and blooper reel • Hotel Torgo, a documentary on the making of "Manos" The Hands of Fate • Exclusive Mini-Posters By Artist Steve Vance
The Touch of Satan (Released: October 18, 2011) (Re-release, previously available from Rhino in MST3K Volume 5).	908 – The Touch of Satan	None
The Atomic Brain (Released October 18, 2011) (Re-release, previously available from Rhino in MST3K Volume 3).	518 – The Atomic Brain (with short: What about Juvenile Delinquency?)	None
Mystery Science Theater 3000 – XXI (Released November 8, 2011) • COLLECTOR'S EDITION	302 – Gamera 304 – Gamera vs. Barugon 308 – Gamera vs. Gaos 312 – Gamera vs. Guiron 316 – Gamera vs. Zigra	• So Happy Together: A Look Back at MST3K & Gamera • Gamera Obscura: A History by August Ragone (author of Eiji Tsuburaya: Master of Monsters) • Gamera Vs. The Chiodo Brothers • Mystery Science Theater Hour wraps • Original Japanese Trailers • 5 Exclusive Mini-Posters By Artist Steve Vance • Orders of the DVD from Shout! Factory's website include the previously available stress ball, along with a pack of Gamera post cards, previously available from Shout! Factory's releases of the movies on their own on DVD.
Mystery Science Theater 3000 – XXII (Released December 6, 2011)	306 – Time of the Apes 314 – Mighty Jack 610 – The Violent Years (with short: Young Man's Fancy) 702 – The Brute Man (with short: The Chicken of Tomorrow)	• Introductions by August Ragone (author of Eiji Tsuburaya: Master of Monsters) and Mary Jo Pehl • Mystery Science Theater Hour wraps • Education: Archival interview with Delores Fuller and Kathy Wood • Trail of the Creeper: Making The Brute Man • The Making of MST3K (1997) • 4 Exclusive Mini-Posters By Artist Steve Vance
The Wild Wild World of Batwoman (Released March 20, 2012) (Re-release, previously available from Rhino as a single)	515 – The Wild Wild World of Batwoman (with short: Cheating)	None
Girl in Gold Boots (Released March 20, 2012) (Re-release, previously available from Rhino in MST3K Volume 4)	1002 – Girl in Gold Boots	None
Mystery Science Theater 3000 – XXIII (Released March 27, 2012)	210 – King Dinosaur (with short: X Marks the Spot) 323 – The Castle of Fu Manchu 608 – Code Name: Diamond Head (with short: A Day at the Fair) 611 – Last of the Wild Horses	• New Introduction By Frank Conniff • The Incredible Mr. Lippert (a Ballyhoo Production) • Vintage MST3K Promos • Life After MST3K: Kevin Murphy • Code Name: Quinn Martin • Darkstar: Robots Don’t Need SAG Cards • Original Trailers • 4 Exclusive Mini-Posters By Artist Steve Vance
Mystery Science Theater 3000 – XXIV (Released July 31, 2012)	310 – Fugitive Alien 318 – Star Force: Fugitive Alien II 617 – The Sword and the Dragon 624 – Samson vs. the Vampire Women	• Introductions by Japanese cinema historian August Ragone • You Asked for It: Sandy Frank Speaks! • Mystery Science Theater Hour wraps • Life After MST3K: Frank Conniff • MST3K Shorts: Snow Thrills & A Date with Your Family • Lucha Gringo: K. Gordon Murray Meets Santo • 4 Exclusive Mini-Posters By Artist Steve Vance
Mystery Science Theater 3000 – XXV (Released December 4, 2012)	110 – Robot Holocaust (with short: Radar Men from the Moon, Part 9) 508 – Operation Double 007 (as Operation Kid Brother) 615 – Kitten with a Whip 801 – Revenge of the Creature	• Introductions by Mike Nelson and Joel Hodgson • Life After MST3K: J. Elvis Weinstein and Bill Corbett • Jack Arnold at Universal • 4 Exclusive Mini-Posters By Artist Steve Vance • Orders of the DVD from Shout! Factory's website include an extra disc with all MST3K Radar Men from the Moon segments with an introduction by J. Elvis Weinstein.
Mystery Science Theater 3000 – XXVI (Released March 26, 2013)	411 – The Magic Sword 516 – Alien from L.A. 620 – Danger!! Death Ray 803 – The Mole People	• Interview with The Magic Sword director Bert I. Gordon • Interview with Alien from L.A. director Albert Pyun • Of Mushrooms and Madmen: Making The Mole People • Life After MST3K: Mike Nelson • Theatrical Trailers • 4 Exclusive Mini-Posters By Artist Steve Vance
Mystery Science Theater 3000 – XXVII (Released July 23, 2013)	108 – The Slime People (with short: Radar Men from the Moon, Part 6) 205 – Rocket Attack U.S.A. (with short: The Phantom Creeps, Chapter 2) 523 – Village of the Giants 804 – The Deadly Mantis	• Interviews with Judith Fraser and Joy Harmon • Introduction by Mary Jo Pehl • Life After MST3K: Trace Beaulieu • Chasing Rosebud: The Cinematic Life of William Alland • Theatrical Trailers • 4 Exclusive Mini-Posters By Artist Steve Vance • Orders of the DVD from Shout! Factory's website include an extra disc with all MST3K General Hospital, The Phantom Creeps, and Undersea Kingdom segments.
Mystery Science Theater 3000 – 25th Anniversary Edition (Volume XXVIII) • COLLECTOR'S EDITION (Released November 26, 2013) • STANDARD EDITION (Released December 10, 2013)	111 – Moon Zero Two 422 – The Day the Earth Froze (with short: Here Comes the Circus) 802 – The Leech Woman 909 – Gorgo Re-issues of: 512 – Mitchell 513 – The Brain That Wouldn't Die (Re-releases, both previously available as a solo DVD from Rhino).	• Three-part documentary Return to Eden Prairie: 25 Years of Mystery Science Theater 3000 • Ninth Wonder of the World: The Making of Gorgo (MST3K Edition) • Last Flight of Joel Robinson • Life After MST3K: Mary Jo Pehl • Mystery Science Theater Hour wraps • Leonard Maltin Explains Something • Interview with Marilyn (Hanold) Neilson • Original movie trailers. • 4 Exclusive Mini-Posters By Artist Steve Vance • Slipcase Box
Mystery Science Theater 3000 – XXIX (Released March 25, 2014)	112 – Untamed Youth 412 – Hercules and the Captive Women 805 – The Thing That Couldn't Die 903 – The Pumaman	• Original version of The Pumaman • New Interview with Untamed Youth star Mamie Van Doren • New Interview with The Pumaman star Walter G. Alton, Jr. • The Movie That Couldn't Die • New Introductions by Joel Hodgson • About Joel Hodgson's Riffing Myself • MST3K Artist in Residence: Steve Vance • Theatrical Trailers • 4 Exclusive Mini-Posters By Artist Steve Vance
Mystery Science Theater 3000 – XXX (Released July 29, 2014)	113 – The Black Scorpion 519 – Outlaw 901 – The Projected Man 1010 – It Lives By Night	• Stinger of Death: Making The Black Scorpion • Writer of Gor: The Novels of John Norman • Director of Gor: On Set with John Bud Cardos • Producer of Gor: Adventures with Harry Alan Towers • Shock to the System: Creating The Projected Man • Extended Trailer for The Frank Music Video • 4 Exclusive Mini-Posters By Artist Steve Vance
Mystery Science Theater 3000 – XXXI "Turkey Day Collection" (Released November 25, 2014) Limited edition collector's tin box.	203 – Jungle Goddess (with short: The Phantom Creeps, Chapter 1) 510 – The Painted Hills (with short: Body Care and Grooming) 912 – The Screaming Skull (with short: Robot Rumpus) 1012 – Squirm (with short: A Case of Spring Fever)	• New Joel Turkey Day intros • Inside the Turkey Day Marathon • Interview with Squirm star Don Scardino • This Film May Kill You: Making The Screaming Skull • Gumby and Clokey • Bumper to Bumper: Turkey Day Through the Years • Theatrical Trailers for The Screaming Skull and Squirm • 4 Exclusive Mini-Posters By Artist Steve Vance • Slipcase Box
Mystery Science Theater 3000 – XXXII (Release Date: March 24, 2015)	401 – Space Travelers 502 – Hercules 520 – Radar Secret Service (with short: Last Clear Chance) 614 – San Francisco International	• New Introductions by Frank Conniff • Barnum of Baltimore: The Early Films of Joseph E. Levine • Marooned: A Forgotten Odyssey • A Brief History of Satellite News • MST-UK with Trace and Frank • Theatrical Trailers • 4 Exclusive Mini-Posters By Artist Steve Vance
Mystery Science Theater 3000 – XXXIII (Release Date: July 28, 2015)	307 – Daddy-O (with short: Alphabet Antics) 313 – Earth vs. the Spider (with short: Speech: Using Your Voice) 522 – Teen-Age Crime Wave 815 – Agent for H.A.R.M.	• 4 Exclusive Mini-Posters By Artist Steve Vance • Beatnick Blues: Investigating Daddy-O • This Movie Has Legs: Looking Back at Earth Vs. The Spider • Film It Again, Sam: The Katzman Chronicles • Tommy Cook: From Jungle Boy to Teenage Jungle • Peter Mark Richman: In H.A.R.M.'s Way • Mystery Science Theater Hour wraps • Theatrical Trailers
Mystery Science Theater 3000: Volume I (Release Date: September 1, 2015) (Re-release, previously available from Rhino in MST3K Volume 1)	204 – Catalina Caper 606 – The Creeping Terror 607 – Bloodlust! (with short: Uncle Jim's Dairy Farm) 609 – The Skydivers (with short: Why Study Industrial Arts?)	• The Crown Jewels featurette • The Creeping Terror Trailer • Extended Trailer for The Creep Behind the Camera • The Creep Behind the Camera Q&A with Frank Conniff and Trace Beaulieu at Screamfest 2014 • Theatrical Trailers for Catalina Caper, Bloodlust, and The Skydivers
Mystery Science Theater 3000: Volume XXXIV (Release Date: December 1, 2015)	317 – Viking Women and the Sea Serpent (with short: The Home Economics Story) 319 – War of the Colossal Beast (with short: Mr. B Natural) 806 – The Undead 808 – The She-Creature	• New Introductions By Frank Conniff • It Was a Colossal Teenage Movie Machine: The A.I.P. Story • Theatrical Trailers • 4 Exclusive Mini-Posters By Artist Steve Vance
Mystery Science Theater 3000: Volume XXXV (Release Date: March 29, 2016)	315 – Teenage Cave Man (with shorts: Aquatic Wizards and Catching Trouble) 405 – Being from Another Planet 524 – 12 to the Moon (with short: Design for Dreaming) 703 – Deathstalker and the Warriors from Hell	• I Was a Teenage Caveman • Richard Band Remembers • Time Walker (original version) • You Are There: Launching 12 To The Moon • Medieval Boogaloo: The Legend Of Deathstalker III • 4 Exclusive Mini-Posters By Artist Steve Vance
Mystery Science Theater 3000: Volume II (Release Date: May 24, 2016) (Re-release, previously available from Rhino in MST3K Volume 2)	301 – Cave Dwellers 303 – Pod People 622 – Angels Revenge	• Mystery Science Theater 3000: The Shorts Vol. 1 (The Home Economics Story, Junior Rodeo Daredevils, Body Care and Grooming, Cheating, A Date with Your Family, Why Study Industrial Arts?, and Chicken of Tomorrow) on Disc 4. • Mystery Science Theater Hour wraps for Cave Dwellers and Pod People
Mystery Science Theater 3000: Volume XXXVI (Release Date: July 26, 2016)	305 – Stranded in Space 403 – City Limits 704 – The Incredible Melting Man 814 – Riding with Death	• The Devil Down in Georgia: Film Ventures International • City Limits: Rae Dawn Chong Looks Back • Theatrical Trailers for City Limits and The Incredible Melting Man • Interviews with Makeup Effects Artists Greg Cannom and Rick Baker • Interview with Writer/Director William Sachs • The Invisible World of the Gemini Man: Interview with Steven E. de Souza • 4 Exclusive Mini-Posters By Artist Steve Vance An exclusive bonus disc for the first 1,000 orders made via www.shoutfactory.com: The MST3K Annual Summer Blockbuster Review
Mystery Science Theater 3000: Volume III (Release date: September 27, 2016) (Re-release, previously available from Rhino in MST3K Volume 3)	202 – The Sidehackers 320 – The Unearthly (with shorts: Posture Pals and Appreciating Our Parents) 518 – The Atomic Brain (with short: What about Juvenile Delinquency?)	• Alternate takes of the host segments on 202, 320, and 518, and Mystery Science Theater 3000: The Shorts, Volume 2 (Catching Trouble, What to Do on a Date, Last Clear Chance, A Day at the Fair, Keeping Clean and Neat, and The Days of Our Years) on Disc 4. • Mystery Science Theater Hour wraps for The Unearthly • Actor Ross Hagen on The Sidehackers
Mystery Science Theater 3000: Volume XXXVII (Release Date: November 22, 2016)	420 – The Human Duplicators 705 – Escape 2000 817 – The Horror of Party Beach 819 – Invasion of the Neptune Men	• New introductions by Mary Jo Pehl • Mystery Science Theater Hour wraps • August on Neptune featurette with Japanese film historian August Ragone • Leave the Bronx: Making Escape 2000 featurette • Return to Party Beach featurette • Theatrical Trailers • 4 Exclusive Mini-Posters By Artist Steve Vance An exclusive bonus disc for the first 1,500 orders made via www.shoutfactory.com containing: MST3K – Little Gold Statue Preview Special (1995); MST3K Academy of Robots' Choice Awards Preview Special (1998)
Mystery Science Theater 3000: Volume IV (Release date: January 31, 2017) (Re-release, previously available from Rhino in MST3K Volume 4)	820 – Space Mutiny 822 – Overdrawn at the Memory Bank 1002 – Girl in Gold Boots 1009 – Hamlet	Intros by Mike on all episodes and trailer and TV spot on 1002
Mystery Science Theater 3000: Volume XXXVIII (Release date: March 28, 2017)	602 – Invasion U.S.A. (with short: A Date with Your Family) 605 – Colossus and the Headhunters 618 – High School Big Shot (with short: Out of This World) 1007 – Track of the Moon Beast	• Tracking a Moon Beast with actress Leigh Drake • Original release of High School Big Shot • Zugsmith Confidential • Theatrical trailers for High School Big Shot and Invasion U.S.A. • Mike, by Joel • 4 Exclusive mini-posters by artist Steve Vance The first 1,500 orders from ShoutFactory.com will receive an exclusive bonus disc, which will contain: • MST3K: Play MSTie For Me Triple Decker (re-release of Best Brains fan club DVD) Note that the "Play MSTie For Me Triple Decker" bonus disc replaces the originally announced "MST3K: The (Nearly) Definitive KTMA Segment Collection", which has been delayed due to poor quality source material.
Mystery Science Theater 3000: Volume V (Release Date: May 16, 2017) (Re-release, previously available from Rhino in MST3K Volume 5)	821 – Time Chasers 908 – The Touch of Satan 1003 – Merlin's Shop of Mystical Wonders 1006 – Boggy Creek II: And the Legend Continues	• Vintage intros by Mike Nelson on all episodes • Vintage interview with Mike Nelson and Kevin Murphy
Mystery Science Theater 3000: Volume VI (Release Date: October 17, 2017) (Re-release, previously available from Rhino in MST3K Volume 6)	404 – Teenagers From Outer Space 406 – Attack of the Giant Leeches (with short: Undersea Kingdom, Part 1) 511 – Gunslinger	• Shortsighted: An Interview With Film Archivist And MST3K Shorts Supplier Rick Prelinger • Mr. B's Lost Shorts (Mr. B Natural, X Marks the Spot, Hired! Part 1, Design for Dreaming, Johnny at the Fair, and Are You Ready for Marriage?)
Mystery Science Theater 3000: Volume XXXIX (Release date: November 21, 2017)	601 – Girls Town 623 – The Amazing Transparent Man (with short: The Days of Our Years) 1013 – Diabolik Satellite Dishes	• Chuck Love and the Anatomy of a Theme • Beyond Transparency • Showdown in Eden Prairie – Their Final Experiment • The Last Dance • Behind the Screams – Daniel Griffith on Ballyhoo The first 1,500 orders from ShoutFactory.com will receive an exclusive bonus disc, which will contain: • The Complete Poopie! with Poopie!, Poopie II and Poopie Parade of Values
Mystery Science Theater 3000: Volume VII (Release date: February 13, 2018) (Re-release, previously available from Rhino in MST3K Volume 7)	408 – Hercules Unchained 410 – Hercules Against the Moon Men 816 – Prince of Space 407 – The Killer Shrews (with short: Junior Rodeo Daredevils)	• 3 Bonus Shorts: Assignment: Venezuela, Century 21 Calling, and A Case of Spring Fever
Mystery Science Theater 3000: Season Eleven (Release date: April 17, 2018)	1101 - Reptilicus 1102 - Cry Wilderness 1103 - The Time Travelers 1104 - Avalanche 1105 - The Beast of Hollow Mountain 1106 - Starcrash 1107 - The Land That Time Forgot 1108 - The Loves of Hercules 1109 - Yongary 1110 - Wizards of the Lost Kingdom 1111 - Wizards of the Lost Kingdom II 1112 - Carnival Magic 1113 - The Christmas That Almost Wasn't 1114 - At the Earth's Core	• We Brought Back MST3K Documentary
Mystery Science Theater 3000: The Singles Collection (Release date: May 22, 2018) (Re-release, previously available from Rhino in singles and in The Essentials)	106 – The Crawling Hand 209 – The Hellcats 321 – Santa Claus Conquers the Martians 506 – Eegah 507 – I Accuse My Parents (with short: The Truck Farmer)	• Mystery Science Theater 3000 The Shorts, Volume 3 (Speech: Using Your Voice, Aquatic Wizards, Is This Love?, Design for Dreaming, The Selling Wizard, Out of This World, and Once Upon a Honeymoon) on Disc 6. • New intros by Joel Hodgson on Santa Claus Conquers the Martians, Eegah, and I Accuse My Parents. • Mystery Science Theater Hour wraps for Santa Claus Conquers the Martian and I Accuse My Parents. • Don't Knock the Strock featurette on Herbert L. Strock • Man on Poverty Row: The Films of Sam Newfield • Trailers for The Crawling Hand, The Hellcats, Santa Claus Conquers the Martians, and Eegah.
Mystery Science Theater 3000: The Lost and Found Collection (Release date: September 25, 2018) (Re-release, previously available from Shout! Factory in MST3K Volumes XIV and XVII)	101 – The Crawling Eye 103 – The Mad Monster (with short: Radar Men from the Moon, Part 2) 413 – Manhunt in Space (with short: General Hospital, Part 1) 415 – The Beatniks (with short: General Hospital, Part 2) 1005 – Blood Waters of Dr. Z 1008 – Final Justice	• The Crawling Eye special introduction by Joel Hodgson • Mystery Science Theater Hour wraps for The Beatniks • The Main Event: Crow vs. Crow at DragonCon '09 • Interview with Greydon Clark • Original trailers
Mystery Science Theater 3000: Volume VIII (Release date: November 27, 2018) (Re-release, previously available from Rhino in MST3K Volume 8)	907 – Hobgoblins 902 – The Phantom Planet 421 – Monster a Go-Go (with short: Circus on Ice) 603 – The Dead Talk Back (with short: The Selling Wizard)	• Hobgoblins Revisited • Myron Natwick Talks Back • Bill Rebane Speaks
Mystery Science Theater 3000: Volume IX (Released date: January 15, 2019) (Re-release, previously available from Rhino in MST3K Volume 9)	104 – Women of the Prehistoric Planet 207 – Wild Rebels 613 – The Sinister Urge (with short: Keeping Clean and Neat) 812 – The Incredibly Strange Creatures Who Stopped Living and Became Mixed-Up Zombies	• Introduction to 104 by Irene Tsu • They Kill for Kicks: Making Wild Rebels • Introduction to 613 by Conrad Brooks • Wood: Taming The Sinister Urge
Mystery Science Theater 3000: Volume X.2 (Released date: March 19, 2019) (Re-release, previously available from Rhino in MST3K Volume 10.2)	402 – The Giant Gila Monster 503 – Swamp Diamonds (with short: What to Do on a Date) 514 – Teen-Age Strangler (with short: Is This Love?) 810 – The Giant Spider Invasion	• 10.2 Upgrade Sketch Featuring Joel, Frank, and Trace • Video Jukebox Vol. 1 • Poopie II • Interview with Don Sullivan on 402 • Spider Man: Looking Back with Bill Rabane • Vintage DVD Menus for 10.2
The Mystery Science Theater 3000: Volume XI (Released date: June 18, 2019) (Re-release, previously available from Rhino in MST3K Volume 11)	206 – Ring of Terror (with short: The Phantom Creeps, Chapter 3) 409 – Indestructible Man (with short: Undersea Kingdom, Part 2) 414 – Tormented 1011 – Horrors of Spider Island	• Original Theatrical Trailers for 409, 414, and 1011 • Video Jukebox Vol. 2 • Mystery Science Theater Hour wraps for 414 • A Tormented Reunion with director Bert I. Gordon and stars Susan Gordon and Joe Turkel • NEW TO THIS EDITION - Bela Lugosi Creeps: Making a Sinister Serial • NEW TO THIS EDITION - Shock & Awe: Making Indestructible Man
The Mystery Science Theater 3000: Volume XII (Released date: October 8, 2019) (Re-release, previously available from Rhino in MST3K Volume 12)	419 – The Rebel Set (with short: Johnny at the Fair) 504 – Secret Agent Super Dragon 612 – The Starfighters 811 – Parts: The Clonus Horror	• Original Theatrical Trailers for 419, 504, and 811 • Video Jukebox Vol. 3 • Mystery Science Theater Hour wraps for 504 • Interview with The Rebel Set star Don Sullivan • Interview with Parts: The Clonus Horror director Robert Fiveson • NEW TO THIS EDITION - Gene Fowler, Jr. - Mad, Mad, Mad, Mad Moviemaker • NEW TO THIS EDITION - Major Auteur: The Films of Will Zens
Mystery Science Theater 3000: The Gauntlet (Season Twelve) (Release date: November 26, 2019)	1201 - Mac and Me 1202 - Atlantic Rim 1203 - Lords of the Deep 1204 - The Day Time Ended 1205 - Killer Fish 1206 - Ator: The Fighting Eagle	
Mystery Science Theater 3000: Season 13 (Gizmoplex Collector's Edition) (Release Date: February 27, 2024)	1301 - Santo in the Treasure of Dracula 1302 - Robot Wars 1303 - Beyond Atlantis 1304 - Munchie 1305 - Doctor Mordrid 1306 - Demon Squad 1307 - Gamera vs. Jiger 1308 - The Batwoman 1309 - The Million Eyes of Sumuru 1310 - H. G. Wells' The Shape of Things to Come 1311 - The Mask 1312 - The Bubble 1313 - The Christmas Dragon	• "Gizmoblip" sketches • Featured interviews • "Madvertisements" • Q&A with the Cast • Year-end Revue Video • Kickstarter video • Riffed Shorts from Season 13

=== Best Brains ===
Best Brains' DVDs originally from their fan club, then available for purchase until the website changed in 2015 on mst3k.com.

DVD title	Special	Released
Play Mistie for Me Triple Decker	The entire Play Mistie For Me series	2004
Tom Servo's All Time Favorite Host Segments! Vol. 1 (and MST Poopie!)	The first Volume of Tom Servo's All Time Favorite Host Segments and the first Poopie! tape	2005

== Mystery Science Theater 3000: The Movie ==
The feature film Mystery Science Theater 3000: The Movie was released on VHS and laserdisc in 1997 by MCA/Universal Home Video. Image Entertainment released it on DVD in 1998, but was taken out of print by MCA/Universal Home Video in 2000. The Movie was re-released by Universal on May 6, 2008, and was released again in a Blu-ray/DVD combo pack by Shout! Factory on September 3, 2013.

The Blu-ray/DVD combo pack released by Shout! Factory has the following bonus features:

- The Making of Mystery Science Theater 3000: The Movie
- Mystery Science Theater 3000: The Movie: The Motion Picture Odyssey
- This Island Earth: 2 1/2 Years in the Making
- Deleted and Extended scenes
- Mystery Science Theater 3000: The Movie Press Kit
- Original Theatrical Trailer

== See also ==
- The Film Crew
- List of Mystery Science Theater 3000 episodes
- List of RiffTrax
