= Assignment: Venezuela =

1956 American oil industry propaganda film

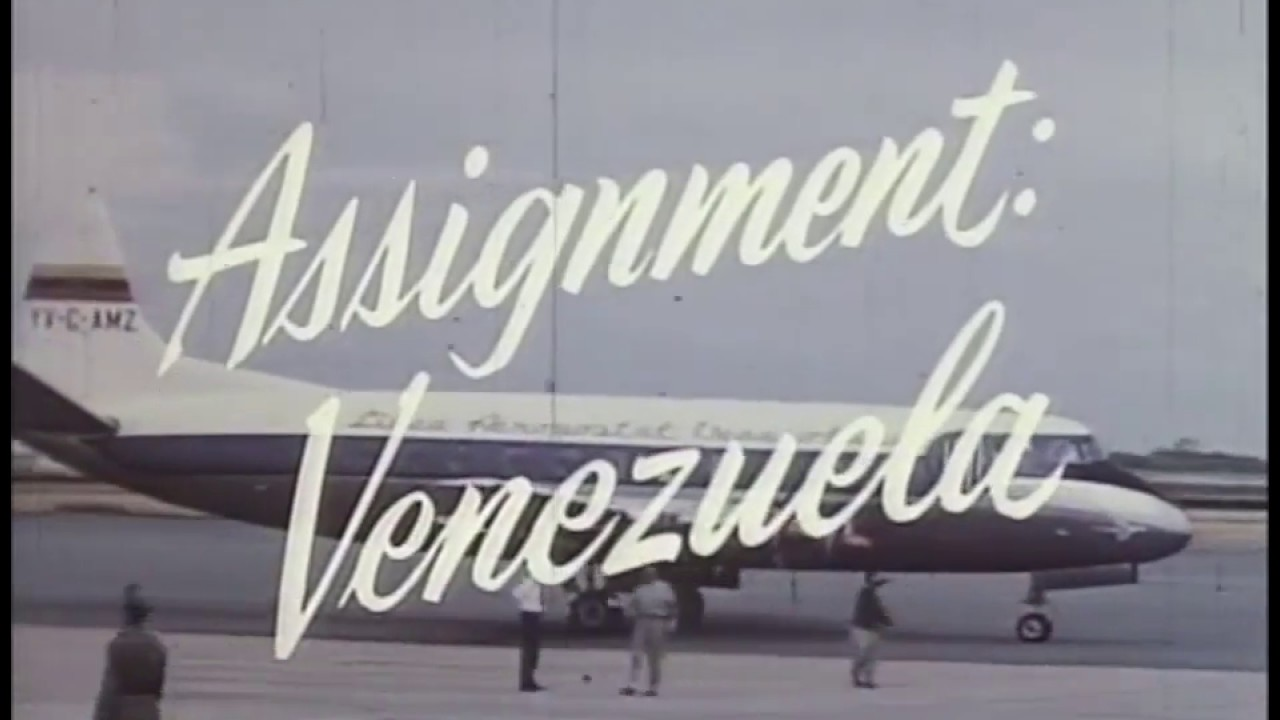
- Title card for Assignment: Venezuela
- Directed by: Jack Tobin
- Produced by: Creole Petroleum Corporation
- Release date: 1956
- Running time: 24 minutes
- Countries: United States; Venezuela

Assignment: Venezuela is a 1956 American short sponsored film. It is a fictional travelogue designed to promote working in the oil industry in Venezuela. It was directed by John H. "Jack" Tobin and is part of the Prelinger Archives, available in the public domain. It was made into a Mystery Science Theater 3000 spoof in the 1990s.

== Synopsis ==
The complete 1956 film

Jim is a middle-level oil engineer who is being relocated to Lake Maracaibo, Venezuela, with his family: wife Ann and two sons. He initially tries to use a Spanish pocket phrase book unsuccessfully, but is quickly greeted at Grano de Oro Airport by a company rep. Jim is taken on a tour of Maracaibo, Caracas, and Lagunillas to familiarize him with the new country; Venezuela is depicted in a positive fashion. In Maracaibo, Jim drives across the waterfront in an imported American car, and in Caracas he explores the newly built University City of Caracas, and studies Spanish intensively.^{:97–98} He writes letters to Ann telling her how great Venezuela is before his family joins him a few weeks later, all having learnt Spanish beforehand.^{:158}

== Production ==
Assignment: Venezuela was produced by Sound Masters, Inc. for the Creole Petroleum Corporation (part of the Standard Oil Company of New Jersey) and directed by John H. "Jack" Tobin. It was filmed on Kodachrome 16mm film with an Arriflex camera. The film is in color and 24 minutes in length, and is part of the Prelinger Archives. It is available in the public domain.

== Mystery Science Theater 3000 version ==
In the 1990s, the satire television series Mystery Science Theater 3000 (MST3K) began producing content for a CD-ROM that included two short films: MST3K—Assignment: Venezuela and a lost film.^{:158} Initially screened at ConventioCon 2, the spoof was temporarily lost during a period of upheaval at MST3K during its production, when it was moving TV channels from Comedy Central to Sci Fi Channel, and when CD-ROM sponsors Voyager began failing financially. It was later released on the home videos "Assignment Venezuela and Other Shorts" in 2001 and "The Mystery Science Theater 3000 Collection, Volume 7" in 2005. Like many MST3K spoofs, it is a film from the 1950s, which were easier to acquire the rights to.^{:158–159}

Chris Morgan, author of The Comic Galaxy of Mystery Science Theater 3000: Twelve Classic Episodes and the Movies They Lampoon, writes in the book that the MST3K version of the film is long for an MST3K short, noting that the intended CD-ROM format gave the producers a chance to "stretch their legs" and keep close to the original running length. He thought that the short itself was dull and lacking in comedic potential, and that keeping the original premise of oil-boom relocation to Venezuela ages the piece significantly, though he observed that "Mike and the 'bots do their best with it" and the running joke made about the width of the lake was funny.^{:158–159}

In an article examining some MST3K shorts, Erin Giannini selects the version of Assignment: Venezuela as a good example of where MST3K makes good film selections to spoof with suitable commentary, and as showing how this practice appears in their shorts as well as feature films.^{:147} Giannini also notes how public domain material generally benefits the spoofs as it provides prime material to mock quaint 1950s American ideals in line with more contemporary social and political issues, which she believes Assignment: Venezuela shows very clearly.^{:149} It also lacks the internal structure and scheduled framing narrative of many other MST3K shorts.^{:150} Giannini argues that the short's lack of public distribution gave the MST3K writers more leeway in their commentary.^{:149}

Although the MST3K writers did not directly address the colonialism present in the film, according to Giannini, the commentary does show an awareness of it, including interjections calling the protagonist "white devil" and a sarcastic reference to the United States as "the best country ever". Other reactions are more critical of the oil industry, dubbing the placement pattern of offshore oil wells a "pentacle to Satan" and spoofing the over-exuberant joy at Venezuelan oil success by saying that "oil is a loving god".^{:150}

== Analysis ==
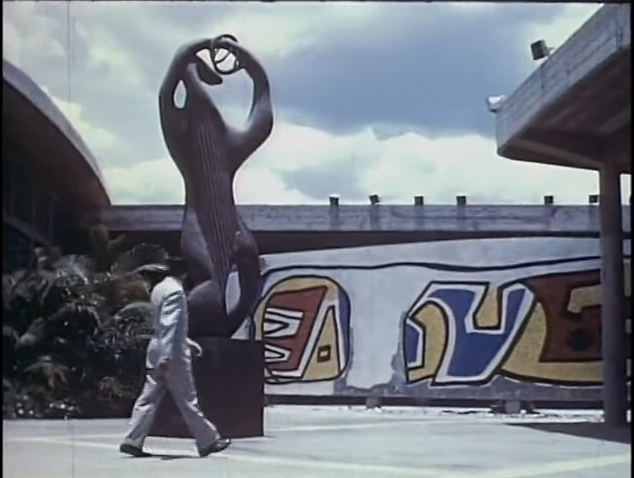
Still frame of "Jim" visiting the Modernist Plaza Cubierta at Central University of Venezuela

The film was produced in the context of the Marcos Pérez Jiménez military dictatorship, with scholar Lisa Blackmore describing the propaganda and national image of that time as having distinct dual purposes: for Venezuelans, the Venezuelan leaders wanted to show an independent anti-capitalist nation, and for Americans involved in the oil trade they wanted to present an attractive, modern, Western nation. Blackmore writes that "this mission to confirm Venezuela's development on this basis of its embrace of the American way of life transpires clearly" in the film.^{:97}

Scholar Miguel Tinker Salas wrote that the film was part of a practice intended to make the American employees more sympathetic to the Venezuelan locals upon arrival, and to not be too brash; he also believes it was unsuccessful in this aim. He states this is because it was only shown to employees of petroleum corporations, not their families, and was paired with extensive classes in Venezuelan culture that generally perturbed the employees — enough for stories of expatriates calling the practice "indoctrination" to arise. Tinker also suggests that anything learnt from the lessons and film were quickly forgotten, with American oil workers still retaining their opinion of cultural dominance.^{:147–148}

Television scholar Erin Giannini argues the original film "shares features with mental hygiene films such as A Date with Your Family as well as the overt propagandizing of Invasion USA", writing that Assignment: Venezuela "attempts to sanitize" many of the racial and environmental issues relating to US-Venezuelan oil ventures. She notes that "some" treat the film as an accurate historical record of 1950s Venezuela.^{:150}

== See also ==
- Propaganda in the United States
