= The Chicken of Tomorrow =

1948 film by Patrick Allen

- Directed by: Patrick Allen
- Starring: Lowell Thomas (narrator)
- Release date: 1948 (U.S.)
- Running time: 20 minutes
- Country: United States
- Language: English

The Chicken of Tomorrow is a 1948 documentary short film about advances in chicken farming. This mini-documentary was narrated by Lowell Thomas and is in the public domain. The film was sponsored by Texaco (known at the time as The Texas Company).

The film was mocked in a seventh-season episode of Mystery Science Theater 3000.

== Synopsis ==
The Chicken of Tomorrow deals with poultry farming and egg farming in the mid-1940s. Filmed to educate the public about how poultry and eggs are farmed, it also deals with how advances in genetic engineering and technology produce larger chickens. Eggs are farmed and kept in industrial incubators, and an equal number of chickens are used for meat and other products. Altogether, this produces more food for less money and allows people to support local poultry farms without breaking the bank. This is relatively similar to today's practice of poultry farming despite some technological differences.

== See also ==
- List of films in the public domain in the United States
- Eggs as food
- Poultry farming
- Genetic engineering
- Industrialized agriculture
- List of Mystery Science Theater 3000 episodes
