= Wild Rebels =

- Theatrical release poster
- Directed by: William Grefe
- Written by: William Grefe
- Starring: Steve Alaimo; Bobbie Byers; John Vella; Willie Pastrano; Jeff Gillen
- Music by: Al Jacobs
- Release date: 1967
- Running time: 90 minutes
- Country: United States
- Language: English

Wild Rebels is a 1967 film directed by William Grefe and starring Steve Alaimo as Rod Tillman, a stock car driver who goes undercover as the wheelman for a motorcycle gang. The tagline for the film was "They live for kicks... love for kicks... kill for kicks".

== Plot ==
Rod Tillman (Alaimo) is a stock car driver who, after crashing his latest car in a race, is out of money and decides to quit the stock car racing scene. After selling his trailer, Rod heads to a bar, Swinger's Paradise, where he meets a group of bikers—Banjo (Willie Pastrano), Fats (Jeff Gillen), their leader Jeeter (John Vella), and their girl Linda (Bobbie Byers)—who call themselves "Satan's Angels." Banjo had recognized Rod as a stock car driver, and the group invites Rod out to their shack to discuss a business proposal. At the shack, Jeeter informs Rod that the gang is from California and they are unfamiliar with the "southern countryside" of Florida. Jeeter makes him a proposal to be their getaway driver in an upcoming robbery. Rod declines and Banjo holds him at knife-point before Jeeter allows him to leave (after Rod leaves Jeeter tells the other that he is certain Rod will reconsider "when he gets hungry").

On his way back to town, Rod is stopped in the forest by a group of police officers led by Lt. Dorn (Walter Philbin). After speaking to Rod, Dorn determines that they need someone skilled at driving a car as it would be easy to spot motorcycles in front of a business prior to a robbery. Since the gang's next target is unknown, Dorn recruits Rod as an undercover agent to discover their plans. In order to make sure the gang believes that Rod is genuinely interested in joining their gang, the police set Rod up in auto race in which another undercover officer runs him off the track forcing him to crash his car. Rod meets up with the gang (who showed up at the race after seeing an article in the paper) and is allowed to join them as their future getaway driver. Rod is forced to live with the group in order to ensure he will not divulge their plans to anyone else, forcing Rod to bury handwritten messages outside and signal the nearby surveilling police with a lighter.

The gang robs a local gun store, during which the proprietor is shot, and acquires a large arsenal of weapons. Back at the hideout, Rod is made to wait outside while the details of the robbery are being discussed, and Linda is sent outside to watch him. After singing her a song - "I Like What I Know About You" - Linda reveals that she doesn't commit these crimes for financial gain, but for the thrill of the action: "kicks" as she calls it. Rod and Linda briefly kiss, but they are interrupted by Banjo and a fight breaks out from which Rod emerges victorious.

The next day, the gang reveals their target to Rod on the drive there: the Citrusville Bank. Feeling that they are being watched by police, the gang takes an offroad path to Citrusville next to the railroad tracks, losing the tailing officers in the process. The gang reaches Citrusville and the robbery commences. Waiting outside in the getaway car, Rod signals a passing police car by flashing his headlights and informs them that the bank is being robbed. Banjo, witnessing this from the bank window, kills both police officers with a shotgun and informs Jeeter than Rod had signaled them. The gang piles into the car forcing Rod to drive at gunpoint.

After a lengthy chase during which several police are shot, the getaway car's gas tank is struck by a bullet, forcing the gang to abandon the vehicle and take shelter in an abandoned lighthouse. After a protracted firefight with police, Banjo is killed when he unsuccessfully tries to escape on a police motorcycle. Fats heads up the spiral staircase to the top of the lighthouse in order to snipe police, but is shot and killed as well. Upon seeing this, Rod rushes up the staircase trying to get Fats' gun with Jeeter in pursuit. Rod is hit in the arm by a bullet, and a laughing Jeeter points his shotgun at Rod's face telling him "see you, later." Just then, a shot rings out striking Jeeter in the back. A remorseful Linda behind him is the one who fired. Jeeter falls over the staircase railing to his death, with Linda lamenting to Rod about how it was "all for kicks." Linda is subsequently arrested, and Rod and Lt. Dorn walk off together.

== Main cast ==
- Steve Alaimo as Rod Tillman
- Willie Pastrano as Banjo
- John Vella as Jeeter
- Jeff Gillen as Fats
- Bobbie Byers as Linda
- Walter R. Philbin as Lt. Dorn
- Art Barker as gun shop owner
- Bobby Brack as race car driver
- The Birdwatchers as band in the bar

== Music ==
Songs and music, including the eponymous opening titles theme, were by Al Jacobs. The Florida garage band The Birdwatchers (Dave Chiodo Jr., Eddie Martinez, Joey Murcia, Robert Pucetti, and Sammy Hall) are shown performing the songs "And I Will" and "Can I Do It?" in the scene at Swinger's Paradise. Steve Alaimo also sings "You Don't Love Me" in the same sequence, with the Birdwatchers shown as providing backup. The song "I Like What I Know About You" is heard twice, first during a scene, and later at the film's finale.

== Reception ==
The film was featured as an episode of the Comedy Central film-mocking television series Mystery Science Theater 3000, and was released on the Collection, Volume 9 box set. The episode is notable for giving Gypsy more character and personality whenever she is not running the Satellite of Love's higher functions.

== See also ==
- The Hellcats
- The Sidehackers
