= Miguel Tinker Salas =

American historian of modern Latin America

Miguel Tinker Salas (born 1953 in Caripito) is a Venezuelan historian and professor at Pomona College in Claremont, California, United States. He specializes in modern Latin America having written books, edited volumes, and essays on Mexico and Venezuela. He frequently serves as a political analyst and his comments can be seen on television, radio, and print media.

== Life ==
Tinker Salas earned his bachelor's, master's, and Ph.D. in history from the University of California, San Diego. He began his career as a professor teaching at University of California, San Diego and Arizona State University. Since 1993, Tinker Salas has served as a professor of history and Chicano/a and Latino/a studies at Pomona College. In 2005, he became an endowed chair and Professor in Latin American History and coordinator of the Latin American Studies Program 2006-2011 and 2019–present. He has also served as the chair of the History department 2008–2011.

Tinker Salas's research and academic interests include a wide range of topics related to the history of Latin America, and Latino/as within the United States. He has published and lectured widely on Venezuelan Politics, Oil and Culture; the U.S. presence in Venezuela and Mexico; Mexican/U.S. border society; Mexican society and politics, Chicano/a Latino/a Studies and the Latin American diaspora.

== Books ==
Tinker Salas's first book Under the Shadow of the Eagle examines the deep ties that Sonoran society had developed with the U.S. economy by the late nineteenth century, and how “these ties led to increased cultural interaction as well.” Tinker Salas's second book The Enduring Legacy studies the cultural and social legacy of multinational oil companies in Venezuela. According to Marco Cupolo, the book “provides a concise, well-supported background to contemporary oil politics and social conflict in Venezuela.” In 2009, Tinker Salas and Steve Ellner also edited together Venezuela: Hugo Chávez and the Decline of an “Exceptional Democracy.” In 2006, Tinker Salas and Jan Rus co-edited México, 2006-2012: Neoliberalismo, movimientos sociales y política electoral.

== Political analyst ==
Tinker Salas has published articles, which have been cited in newspapers including The Nation, The Huffington Post, La Opinion, Panorama (Maracaibo), El Nacional (Caracas), The Los Angeles Times, The New York Times, The Guardian, and The Associated Press. As a political analyst and consultant, Tinker Salas examines current social and political issues affecting Latin America and Hispanics in the United States. His interviews have appeared on local, national, and international radio and television outlets including CNN, Aljazeera, KPFK, PBS Lehr Newshour, Univision, and Telemundo.

== Awards and grants ==
- International Media Prize for political commentary and critical perspectives on electronic media, Mexican Club de Periodistas / Mexican Journalists' Club, 2009.
- Howard Fellowship, 2003
- National Endowment for the Humanities grant, 1997
- Wig Distinguished Professorship Award for Excellence in Teaching, Pomona College, 1997
- Graves Fellowship, Pomona College, 1996
- President's Fellowship, University of California, 1987–1988

== Publications ==
- Bajo la sombra de las aguilas, Sonora y la transformacion de la frontera durante el Porfiriato. Mexico: Fondo de Cultura Economica, 2010.
- Venezuela: What Everyone Needs to Know. Oxford University Press. 1 February 2015. pp. 3–. ISBN 978-0-19-978328-1.
- The Enduring Legacy: Oil, Culture, and Society in Venezuela. Duke University Press. 20 April 2009. ISBN 978-0-8223-9223-1.
- In the Shadow of the Eagles: Sonora and the Transformation of the Border during the Porfiriato. Berkeley: University of California Press, 1997. ISBN 9780520201293
- (Editor, with Jan Rus) México, 2006-2012: Neoliberalismo, movimientos sociales y política electoral. Zacatecas: Universidad Autónoma de Zacatecas, 2006.
- Steve Ellner; Miguel Tinker Salas (2007). Venezuela: Hugo Chávez and the Decline of an "exceptional Democracy". Rowman & Littlefield. pp. 3–. ISBN 978-0-7425-5456-6.
