= Teen-Age Strangler =

1964 film directed by Ben Parker

- Theatrical release poster
- Directed by: Ben Parker
- Written by: Clark Davis
- Starring: Bill Bloom; John Ensign; Jo Canterbury; John Humphreys
- Cinematography: Fred Singer
- Edited by: John Detra
- Music by: Danny Dean
- Distributed by: Ajay Film Company
- Release date: 1964
- Running time: 61 minutes
- Country: United States
- Language: English

Teen-Age Strangler is a 1964 American independent juvenile delinquency crime drama film directed by Ben Parker. It was made in Huntington, West Virginia. It was re-released in black & white in 1990, resulting in local screenings, newspaper write-ups, and cast reunions. It has become a cult film ever since it was featured on an episode of the TV series Mystery Science Theater 3000.

== Plot ==
A serial killer is on the loose, baffling policemen. Their main suspects are mostly a gang of street racers with one of them, Jimmy, never having an alibi. Even though he's innocent, a can of worms opens as Jimmy's life is thrown into chaos.

== Legacy ==
It was featured on a Season 5 episode of Mystery Science Theater 3000 (MST3K). Actor John Humphreys, who played the role of "Mikey" appeared at the MST3K first Conventio-Con in September, 1994.

== Home media ==
Teen-Age Strangler was released by Sinister Cinema on VHS in 1990 as part of its "wild youth" roster. The film was released by Something Weird Video in 2001 with the movie Teenage Gang Debs as a DVD double feature. The MST3K version has been released by Rhino Home Video as part of the Mystery Science Theater 3000 Collection: Volume 10 (on both Rhino's and MST3K's official websites) and Mystery Science Theater 3000 Collection: Volume 10.2 box sets.
