= Ring of Terror =

1962 film

- Theatrical release poster
- Directed by: Clark L. Paylow
- Written by: Lewis Simeon; Jerrold I. Zinnamon
- Produced by: Alfeo Bocchicchio
- Starring: George Mather; Esther Frust; Austin Green
- Cinematography: Brydon Baker
- Edited by: Jodie Copelan
- Music by: James Cairncross
- Production company: Playstar
- Distributed by: Playstar
- Release date: 1962
- Running time: 72 minutes
- Country: United States
- Language: English

Ring of Terror is a black-and-white 1962 horror film, which centers around a young medical student named Lewis Moffitt who must open a crypt and steal the ring of a deceased man in order to join a fraternity. Directed by Clark L. Paylow from a screenplay by Lewis Simeon and Jerrold I. Zinnamon, the film stars George Mather as Lewis, with Austin Green and Esther Furst in supporting roles.

Ring of Terror was poorly received by nearly every critic who reviewed it. Criticisms were directed at the pacing of the story and the age of the actors, with many critics feeling it was unsuitable for them to play college students due to their age. The film was featured in the sixth episode of the second season of Mystery Science Theater 3000, along with the third chapter of the 1939 serial The Phantom Creeps.

== Premise ==
Medical student Lewis Moffitt (George E. Mather) protects a secret fear of the dark, stemming from an ordeal as a child which involved a dead body that frightened him. Despite this, he acts indifferent during the first autopsy that he and his class witness, which has a positive effect on his courage. However, the autopsy provokes his soon-to-be frat brothers to come up with a strange induction practice, expecting it to go wrong. They task Lewis with finding and taking the ring of a deceased person, so he can be accepted into the fraternity.

Ring of Terror is narrated by a graveyard keeper named R. J. Dobson, who invites the audience to follow him while he attempts to find his missing cat, Puma. When he finds himself near a specific gravestone, he finds himself thinking about Lewis Moffitt and his ordeal.

== Cast ==
- George Mather as Lewis B. Moffitt
- Austin Green as Carl
- Esther Furst as Betty Crawford
- Norman Ollestad as Lewis's roommate
- Lomax Study as Professor Rayburn
- Pamela Raymond as Alice Lund
- Joseph Conway as R. J. Dobson
- June Smaney as Rag Doll Milford
- Ann Morgan as co-ed waitress
- Ollie O'Toole as Dr. Walsh

== Production ==
Ring of Terror was directed by Clark L. Paylow, from a screenplay by Lewis Simeon and Jerrold I. Zinnamon. Ring of Terror is Simeon and Zinnamon's only film credit. Ring of Terror features a musical score by James Cairncross. It is Cairncross' only credit in the entertainment industry. Cinematography was done by Brydon Baker, and the film was edited by Jodie Copelan. It was produced and released by Playstar.

== Reception ==
Ring of Terror received generally negative reviews. A review in Fight Night on Channel 9: Saturday Night Horror Films on New York's WOR-TV, 1973-1987 by James Arena gave Ring of Terror a C, but noted that "it was just off-beat enough to hold my interest." Ring of Terror was included in Steve Miller's 150 Movies You Should Die Before You See. Miller gave Ring of Terror five thumbs down. He especially criticized the fact that the actors cast as college students were far too old, noting that they were in their late 30s and early 40s. Michael Adams, in his book Showgirls, Teen Wolves, and Astro Zombies: A Film Critic's Year-Long Quest to Find the Worst Movie Ever Made, reviewed Ring of Terror and found it to be dull and full of padding. Like Miller, he noted that the actors were far too old to play college students. He pointed out that lead George E. Mather was 42 when he filmed Ring of Terror. VideoHound's Golden Movie Retriever called Ring of Terror a "cheaply made flop."

=== Mystery Science Theater 3000 ===
Ring of Terror was featured in a second season episode of the television comedy series Mystery Science Theater 3000. It was the sixth episode of the season, and was first broadcast on Comedy Central on November 3, 1990. Due to the short running time of Ring of Terror, the third chapter of the 1939 serial The Phantom Creeps was played after Ring of Terror concluded. It was the final chapter of The Phantom Creeps to be featured on Mystery Science Theater 3000.

== Home media ==
Ring of Terror has been released on DVD several times. On July 8, 2003, Alpha Video released Ring of Terror on a standalone DVD. Ring of Terror is included in Mill Creek Entertainment's Nightmare Worlds 50 Movie Pack Collection, a box set containing 50 horror films. It was released on August 15, 2006.

On June 26, 2007, Rhino Home Video released the Mystery Science Theater 3000 episode that features Ring of Terror on DVD, as part of The Mystery Science Theater Collection: Volume 11.
