= A Date with Your Family =

1950 film

- Directed by: Edward G. Simmel
- Written by: Arthur V. Jones
- Produced by: Edward G. Simmel
- Starring: Ralph Hodges; Fred La Porta
- Narrated by: Hugh Beaumont
- Cinematography: Harry F. Burrell
- Edited by: Miriam Bucher
- Distributed by: Encyclopædia Britannica Films
- Release date: 1950
- Running time: 10 minutes
- Country: United States
- Language: English

A Date with Your Family is a 1950 10-minute social engineering short film presented by Simmel-Meservey, directed by Edward G. Simmel, and written by Arthur V. Jones, with Miriam Bucher as editor, primarily to show youth how to act and behave with parents during dinner to have a pleasant time.

== Plot ==
The subject family consists of a father, mother and their children - a daughter, older son and a younger son. The narrator tells what happens with the family; what should happen during the meal, what types of manners and socializing should be exhibited to not sour the time with your family and what should not happen.

== Context ==
There are traditional views of each person to coincide with the image of a nuclear family in the post-war United States in the 1950s.

== Cast ==
- Hugh Beaumont as Narrator
- Ralph Hodges as Brother (uncredited)
- Fred La Porta as Father (uncredited)

== Overview ==
The film starts with the father coming home from work in the afternoon and is met with his wife. The older son is completing his homework when Junior comes home dirty from baseball and is helped to clean up by the older brother. Then the older brother meets Father to have a pleasant chat. The narrator points out that it is not the time for the son to bring up any bad news such as poor grades. The mother and daughter wear their best dresses to the table to please the men of the family and the daughter helps the mother to set up the table. When the food is served, no one is to begin eating until the mother and father do so. Table talk is to remain pleasant and inoffensive and everyone should be themselves, no one is to be emotional. It is shown that the conversation should be light and not egocentric. The daughter begins to criticize her clothes to other women which causes negativity. The older son begins to talk and motion graphically about a fight, in turn disgusting the father, and then argues with his sister. When the meal is over, the narrator then points out the dishes being put away by the brother and sister while the mother and father talk. The short then ends with the narrator saying that a pleasant time can be shared with the family every time if all of these steps are taken and also the actions that should be avoided.

== Legacy ==
A Date with Your Family was satirized on a season six episode of Mystery Science Theater 3000 as a short paired with the Cold War scare film Invasion U.S.A.. It is known as one of the most humorous shorts of the series, also containing many dark jokes ("Emotions are for ethnic people" and also "Brother has a tight psychological grip on Junior") because of the extremely restrictive nature of instructions for a common social event such as a family dinner. The title itself was mocked as well, with the characters cracking jokes that implied it suggested incest. Tom Servo referred to it as "The Woody Allen Story" while Mike Nelson commented, "Hey, I like my family...as a friend!".

A Date with Your Family was featured in the first shorts set on the Mystery Science Theater 3000 - II DVD collection
