= The Selling Wizard =

1954 film

The Selling Wizard is a 1954 commercial short film presented by Anheuser-Busch that runs for 10 minutes to showcase large modern freezers that make it easier for grocers to sell their goods and make higher profits. It is aimed at businesses that require display freezers for their products. The narrator makes points of the promoted freezer cabinet to utilize efficient design in space saving, modernized refrigeration methods, and attractive presentation of products stored in the freezer.

== In popular culture ==
- It is satirized on an episode of Mystery Science Theater 3000 as a short paired with the movie The Dead Talk Back.
