= Clowns in the Sky =

Soundtrack album by Cast of Mystery Science Theater 3000
- Released: 1996
- Genre: Soundtrack
- Label: Precision Tapes
- Producers: Best Brains, Inc.

Cast of Mystery Science Theater 3000 chronology
Clowns in the Sky (1996)	Clowns in the Sky II (1998)

Clowns in the Sky: The Musical History of Mystery Science Theater 3000 is the title of a CD featuring music from the first seven seasons of Mystery Science Theater 3000.

== Release ==
Released in 1996 exclusively through the MST3K Info Club, the songs featured include the many versions of the opening theme, the closing theme, and various tunes that were featured in host segments throughout the show. The CD takes its name from "A Clown in the Sky", the song featured in the last host segment of episode 303 (Pod People).

The complete albums were released on vinyl in 2019 by Shout Factory.

== Track listing ==
No.	Title	Writer(s)	Length
1.	"Theme Song Version 1A" (Seasons 1–5.5 with Joel)	Charlie Erickson, Joel Hodgson, Josh Weinstein	1:27
2.	"My Creepy Girl" (Catalina Caper)	Michael J. Nelson, The Brains	2:27
3.	"Godzilla Genealogy Bop" (Godzilla vs. the Sea Monster)	Faye Burkholder, Kevin Murphy	2:02
4.	"If Chauffeurs Ruled the World" (Ring of Terror)	Frank Conniff, Michael J. Nelson	2:26
5.	"Music from Some Guys in Space" (The Pod People)	Michael J. Nelson	1:51
6.	"Tibby, Oh Tibby" (Gamera)	Michael J. Nelson	2:47
7.	"The Plate Spinning Song" (Gamera vs. Gaos)	Michael J. Nelson	1:08
8.	"A Clown in the Sky" (The Pod People)	Kevin Murphy, Michael J. Nelson	2:15
9.	"The Waffle Song" (Viking Women and the Sea Serpent)	Michael J. Nelson	0:54
10.	"A Patrick Swayze Christmas" (Santa Claus Conquers the Martians)	Michael J. Nelson	3:25
11.	"Master Ninja Theme Song" (Master Ninja I)	Michael J. Nelson, Frank Conniff	1:17
12.	"Tribute to Pants" (Hercules Against the Moon Men)	Frank Conniff, Michael J. Nelson	1:39
13.	"Gypsy Rose Me!" (The Day the Earth Froze)	Mary Jo Pehl, Mike J. Nelson	0:52
14.	"Kim Cattrall" (City Limits)	Michael J. Nelson	1:07
15.	"Ode on Estelle" (The Magic Sword)	Michael J. Nelson, Paul Chaplin	3:37
16.	"Gypsy Moons" (Crash of Moons)	Bridget Jones Nelson, Michael J. Nelson	2:10
17.	"Hired! Original Broadway Cast" (Bride of the Monster)	Kevin Murphy, Michael J. Nelson	3:24
18.	"What a Pleasant Journey" (The Girl in Lovers Lane)	Michael J. Nelson, Frank Conniff	1:50
19.	"Theme Song Version 2" (Seasons 5.5–6 with Mike)	Charlie Erickson, Joel Hodgson, Best Brains	1:28
20.	"The Janitor Song" (Teen-Age Strangler)	Michael J. Nelson, David Sussman, Frank Conniff	2:16
21.	"Nummy Muffin Coocol Butter" (Colossus and the Headhunters)	Frank Conniff, Michael J. Nelson	1:39
22.	"Merry Christmas...If That's OK" (Santa Claus)	Frank Conniff, Michael J. Nelson	2:08
23.	"The Greatest Frank of All" (Village of the Giants)	Bridget Jones Nelson, Michael J. Nelson	1:32
24.	"Livin' in Deep Thirteen" (The Violent Years)	Michael J. Nelson, Best Brains	0:56
25.	"Bouncy Upbeat Song" (Red Zone Cuba)	Frank Conniff, Michael J. Nelson	1:35
26.	"Whom Shall I Kill?" (Samson vs. the Vampire Women)	Bridget Jones Nelson, Michael J. Nelson	2:24
27.	"Tubular Boobular Joy" (Outlaw)	Michael J. Nelson, Kevin Murphy	1:11
28.	"Theme Song Version 3" (Season 7 with Mrs. Forrester)	Charlie Erickson, Joel Hodgson, Best Brains	1:30
29.	"Mighty Science Theater" (End credit theme)		1:04

== See also ==
- Rifftrax-who also released music as The Rifftones
- List of films considered the worst
- Windham Hill
