= List of Mystery Science Theater 3000 characters =

Over its run, Mystery Science Theater 3000 has seen the arrival and departure of various characters. It also featured many recurring guest characters. Below is a listing of both the main characters and the recurring characters from the series.

== Main characters ==
Cast of Mystery Science Theater 3000
Character	KTMA season (1988–89)	Comedy Channel / Comedy Central seasons (1989–1996)							The Movie (1996)	Sci-Fi seasons (1997–99)			Netflix seasons (2017–18)		Gizmoplex seasons (2022)	RiffTrax seasons (2026)
Character	"0"	1	2	3	4	5	6	7	The Movie (1996)	8	9	10	11	12	13	14
Joel Robinson^{1}	Joel Hodgson	Joel Hodgson	Joel Hodgson	Joel Hodgson	Joel Hodgson	Joel Hodgson						Joel Hodgson^{3}			Joel Hodgson	
Mike Nelson						Michael J. Nelson	Michael J. Nelson	Michael J. Nelson	Michael J. Nelson	Michael J. Nelson	Michael J. Nelson	Michael J. Nelson				Michael J. Nelson
Jonah Heston													Jonah Ray	Jonah Ray	Jonah Ray	
Emily Connor															Emily Marsh	
Crow T. Robot	Josh Weinstein; Trace Beaulieu	Trace Beaulieu	Trace Beaulieu	Trace Beaulieu	Trace Beaulieu	Trace Beaulieu	Trace Beaulieu	Trace Beaulieu	Trace Beaulieu	Bill Corbett	Bill Corbett	Bill Corbett	Hampton Yount	Hampton Yount	Hampton Yount; Kelsey Ann Brady	Bill Corbett
Tom Servo	Josh Weinstein	Josh Weinstein	Kevin Murphy	Kevin Murphy	Kevin Murphy	Kevin Murphy	Kevin Murphy	Kevin Murphy	Kevin Murphy	Kevin Murphy	Kevin Murphy	Kevin Murphy	Baron Vaughn	Baron Vaughn	Baron Vaughn; Conor McGiffin; Josh Weinstein^{3}	Kevin Murphy
Gypsy / Gypsum / GPC / GPC2	Josh Weinstein	Jim Mallon	Jim Mallon	Jim Mallon	Jim Mallon	Jim Mallon	Jim Mallon	Jim Mallon	Jim Mallon	Jim Mallon	Patrick Brantseg	Patrick Brantseg	Rebecca Hanson	Rebecca Hanson	Rebecca Hanson; Yvonne Freese	
M. Waverly													Grant Bacioccio	Grant Bacioccio	Grant Bacioccio	
Growler													Russ Walko	Russ Walko	Russ Walko	
Dr. Clayton Forrester	Trace Beaulieu	Trace Beaulieu	Trace Beaulieu	Trace Beaulieu	Trace Beaulieu	Trace Beaulieu	Trace Beaulieu	Trace Beaulieu	Trace Beaulieu							Trace Beaulieu^{3}
Dr. Laurence Erhardt	Josh Weinstein	Josh Weinstein												Josh Weinstein^{3}	Josh Weinstein	
TV's Frank^{2}			Frank Conniff	Frank Conniff	Frank Conniff	Frank Conniff	Frank Conniff					Frank Conniff^{3}				Frank Conniff^{3}
Pearl Forrester							Mary Jo Pehl^{3}	Mary Jo Pehl		Mary Jo Pehl	Mary Jo Pehl	Mary Jo Pehl	Mary Jo Pehl^{3}		Mary Jo Pehl	Mary Jo Pehl
Professor Bobo										Kevin Murphy	Kevin Murphy	Kevin Murphy	Kevin Murphy^{3}			Kevin Murphy
Observer / Brain Guy										Bill Corbett	Bill Corbett	Bill Corbett	Bill Corbett^{3}			Bill Corbett
Kinga Forrester													Felicia Day	Felicia Day	Felicia Day	
Max (TV's Son of TV's Frank)													Patton Oswalt	Patton Oswalt	Patton Oswalt	
Ardy													Joel Hodgson	Joel Hodgson	Joel Hodgson	
Synthia													Rebecca Hanson	Rebecca Hanson	Rebecca Hanson	
Mega Synthia															Yvonne Freese	

Notes

Cambot is a regular character throughout the entire run of the show, but has no performer.

1. "Joel Hodgson" during season 0; Simply "Joel" (no last name) during Season 1
2. Simply "Frank" during seasons 2 and 3
3. Guest appearance only

== Recurring guest characters ==
- Magic Voice - a disembodied female voice that warns the crew of upcoming commercial breaks and makes other announcements.
- Jerry and Sylvia (various unpaid interns at Best Brains) - two "mole people" from the movie The Mole People (featured much later as a season 8 episode) who occasionally assisted the Mads and stopped by for social events. They also work Deep 13's camera in the first host segment of "Lost Continent". Presumably named after Sylvia and Gerry Anderson, the creative team behind Space: 1999 and Supermarionation shows like Thunderbirds and Stingray, some of which were featured as KTMA-season episodes.
- Jack Perkins (Michael J. Nelson) - in real life the host of the A&E Network's Biography program, Perkins first appeared in MST3K simply to annoy the Mads by describing the movie with glowing praise. When MST3K appeared in syndication as The Mystery Science Hour, Nelson's fake "Jack Perkins" hosted the show.
- Torgo (Michael J. Nelson) - a monster/henchman (supposed to be a satyr) in Manos: The Hands of Fate, Torgo was among the most frequently returning "guest characters" of MST3K. He got his knees fixed and returned as "Torgo the White" (an obvious parody of Gandalf the White) to accompany TV's Frank to "Second Banana Heaven" and was never seen again (episode 624, "Samson vs. the Vampire Women").
- Jan-in-the-Pan (Mary Jo Pehl) - a woman's severed head from the movie The Brain That Wouldn't Die.
- Pitch (Paul Chaplin) - a devil from the Mexican movie Santa Claus, Pitch was one of the few characters from the Comedy Central seasons to return in the Sci Fi Channel seasons.
- Santa Claus - appeared three times on the show, including a fight with Pitch, bellowing, "I'm here to chew candy canes and kick ass, and I'm all out of candy canes!". Portrayed twice by Kevin Murphy and once by Joel Hodgson.
- The Nanites (voiced variously by Kevin Murphy, Paul Chaplin, Mary Jo Pehl, and Bridget Jones) - self-replicating, bio-engineered organisms that work on the ship, they are microscopic creatures that reside in the S.O.L.'s computer systems. (They are similar to the creatures in Star Trek: The Next Generation episode "Evolution", which featured "nanites" taking over the Enterprise.) The Nanites made their first appearance in season 8. Based on the concept of nanotechnology, their comical deus ex machina activities included such diverse tasks as instant repair and construction, hairstyling, performing a Nanite variation of a flea circus, conducting a microscopic war, and even destroying the Observers' planet after a dangerously vague request from Mike to "take care of [a] little problem". They also ran a microbrewery. The Nanites were largely forgotten about during the show's last season, and we are not given an explanation of their fate following the series finale.
  - Kevin Murphy played Wade the Nanite.
  - Paul Chaplin played Ned the Nanite.
  - Mary Jo Pehl played Jody the Nanite and Shelli the Nanite.
  - Bridget Jones played Slicer the Nanite.
- Ortega (Paul Chaplin) - an unintelligible, decrepit, cigar-smoking henchman from the movie The Incredibly Strange Creatures Who Stopped Living and Became Mixed-Up Zombies, Ortega recurred occasionally in the three Sci Fi seasons.
- "Krankor" (Bill Corbett), who appeared in a host segment during the Prince of Space episode, and returned three episodes later in a host segment for Invasion of the Neptune Men, featuring a movie with a similar plot. He was a vain, would-be conqueror with an unfortunately chicken-like appearance and a drawn-out, braying laugh (described by BBI as "like a Buick not turning over").
- The Skeleton Crew is Kinga's house band that plays in intro and outro segments. Har Mar Superstar leads the Skeleton Crew as their director.
