= The Magic Sword (1962 film) =

1962 film by Bert I. Gordon

- Theatrical release poster
- Directed by: Bert I. Gordon
- Written by: Bernard Schoenfeld
- Produced by: Bert I. Gordon
- Starring: Basil Rathbone; Estelle Winwood; Gary Lockwood; Anne Helm
- Cinematography: Nicolas Vogel; Paul C. Vogel
- Edited by: Harry Gerstad
- Music by: Richard Markowitz
- Color process: Eastmancolor
- Production company: Bert I. Gordon Productions
- Distributed by: United Artists
- Release date: February 22, 1962
- Running time: 80 minutes
- Country: United States
- Language: English

The Magic Sword (also known as St. George and the Dragon, St. George and the Seven Curses and The Seven Curses of Lodac) is a 1962 American adventure fantasy film directed by Bert I. Gordon and starring Basil Rathbone, Estelle Winwood, Gary Lockwood and Anne Helm. It was written by Bernard Schoenfeld, loosely based on the medieval legend of Saint George and the Dragon.

== Plot ==
Sir George is the foster son of Sybil, an elderly, somewhat ineffectual sorceress. She brought him up after his "royal parents died of the plague" in his infancy.

George has fallen in love with the Princess Helene, but she is kidnapped by the wizard Lodac, who brazenly informs her father that he intends to feed her to his pet dragon in seven days, in revenge for the death of his sister. George wants to go on a quest to liberate his lady love, but Sybil believes he is too young as he is only 20.

Sybil tries to distract the youth George by showing him a magic sword; a steed; an invulnerable suit of armor; and six magically frozen knights that he will command when he turns 21. The impatient George tricks Sybil and locks her in a cellar. He then leaves with the magical implements in the revived company of knights.

Sir George and his party appear before the king and insist on journeying to Lodac's castle to rescue Helene. This request is done despite opposition from Sir Branton, a knight who has also volunteered for the perilous quest. The king promises the rescuer Helene's hand in marriage and half his kingdom. Helene is forced to watch as Lodac feeds two captive sisters, Princess Laura and Princess Grace, to his dragon.

Seven curses bar the path to Lodac's castle. First, the group encounters an ogre, who kills Sir Ulrich of Germany and Sir Pedro of Spain, before George kills it with the help of his horse. When George tries to save Sir Anthony of Italy from drowning in a magic swamp, Branton treacherously kicks him in. Anthony is dissolved and killed by the swamp's caustic waters, but George survives with the help of his magic sword.

Later, Branton meets secretly with Lodac. Branton just so happens to have Lodac's ring, which the magician lost and wants desperately back, as his powers are crippled without it. The kidnapping was solely intended to make Branton look good in exchange for the ring. Sir Dennis of France comes by and Lodac prepares a trap involving Mignonette, a beautiful Frenchwoman, who distracts her compatriot, before turning into an ugly hag who attacks him. George intervenes by banishing Mignonette with his magic shield.

After Mignonette reports back to Lodac following her failed assassination attempt, Lodac finally becomes aware that George is being aided by magic. He contacts Sybil and mocks her abilities. Stung by the criticism, she tries to cast a spell to help George, but ends up inadvertently stripping away all his magical powers.

Sir Dennis and Sir James of Scotland are incinerated alive by a heat spiral when they investigate ahead. Branton then leads George and Sir Patrick of Ireland into a trap, revealing his partnership with Lodac, before sealing them in a cave with deadly green apparitions. Patrick, through the power of his faith, sacrifices his life to allow George to escape.

George sneaks into Lodac's castle and rescues Helene only to then be captured. Lodac gives Helene to Branton in exchange for the ring, but she is then revealed to be Mignonette in disguise. Realizing he had been tricked, Branton attempts to attack Lodac, who uses the ring's magic to transform Branton into a hunting trophy. George is tied up as Lodac prepares to feed the real Helene to his dragon. After George escapes with the help of a number of shrunken prisoners, Sybil arrives and finally remembers the spell that restores George's powers. These powers then enable him to slay the two-headed dragon and save Helene. Sybil steals the ring while Lodac is distracted. When the magician threatens the young couple with the seventh curse (himself), Sybil transforms herself into a large panther and kills him. Helene and George get married and the 6 knights are restored to life. All ends with Sybil walking away smiling while she wears Lodac's dragon ring.

== Cast ==
- Basil Rathbone as Lodac
- Estelle Winwood as Sybil
- Gary Lockwood as Sir George
- Anne Helm as Princess Helene
- Liam Sullivan as Sir Branton
- Maila Nurmi as the hag/sorceress
- Angelo Rossitto as 2nd dwarf
- Danielle De Metz as Mignonette
- Merritt Stone as The King
- Jacques Gallo as Sir Dennis of France
- David Cross as Sir Pedro of Spain
- John Mauldin as Sir Patrick of Ireland
- Taldo Kenyon as Sir Anthony of Italy
- Angus Duncan as Sir James of Scotland
- Leroy Johnson as Sir Ulrich of Germany (Voice by Paul Frees, uncredited)
- Marlene Callahan as Princess Grace
- Nick Bon Tempi as left siamese twin
- Paul Bon Tempi as right siamese twin
- Ann Graves as Princess Laura
- Lorrie Richards as Anne
- Jack Kosslyn as the ogre
- Ted Finn as 1st dwarf

== Production ==
The film was shot on the 20th Century Fox backlot and at Samuel Goldwyn Studio.

=== Comic book adaptation ===
Dell Movie Classic: The Magic Sword (September 1962)

== Reception ==
Variety wrote: "Replete with painstaking special effects to dazzle the eyes and activate the imaginations of younger children, the United Artists release should get its biggest play as part of dual attractions aimed at the kiddie market. Adults who tag along or happen in should find the cinema effects impressive enough for them to tolerate the story, which, if one maintains the right attitude, can prove sporadically amusing and sufficiently diverting."

Boxoffice wrote: "Here is a tongue-in-cheek fairy tale which rises to heights of satirical splendor at times and sinks to ordinary contrived narrative at others. If designed for children, it is somewhat macabre; if for adults, it could get sniggers. But all-in-all, it's a well-mounted, ingeniously created piece of merchandise that has excellent special effects."

== Legacy ==
The film appeared on a 1992 episode of Mystery Science Theater 3000. Characters Joel Robinson (Joel Hodgson) and Tom Servo (Kevin Murphy) said the film was "pretty good for a Bert I. Gordon film" during a theater segment, though Crow T. Robot (Trace Beaulieu) seemed to disagree. The writers of the show continued the praise in their book MST3K Amazing Colossal Episode Guide. It was also spoofed by RiffTrax on August 14, 2015.

A VHS copy of the movie was used in the 2011 short The Magik Iffektor by Canadian experimental filmmaker Christine Lucy Latimer.
