= A Word to the Wives... =

1955 film by Norman Lloyd

A Word to the Wives
- Directed by: Norman Lloyd
- Written by: Jerome Brondfield
- Produced by: Edmund M. Tate
- Starring: Marsha Hunt; Darren McGavin
- Cinematography: William Steiner
- Distributed by: Telamerica Inc.
- Release date: 1955 (US)
- Running time: 12 minutes
- Country: United States
- Language: English

A Word to the Wives is a 1955 American short sponsored comedy film directed by Norman Lloyd and starring Marsha Hunt and Darren McGavin. It was written by Jerome Bronfield.

== Production ==
The film, now in the public domain, was sponsored by the American Gas Association, the National Association of Home Builders, and Woman's Home Companion magazine, and features products by Caloric, Whirlpool Corporation, Formica Corporation, Republic Steel Kitchens, and Ruud.

== Plot ==
Housewife Jane Peters is envious of her friend Alice's new ranch house. At Alice's suggestion, she decides to trick her husband, George, into buying a new kitchen. Jane leaves her husband and son alone while she visits her mother in Cleveland.

George is completely incompetent when trying to cook for himself and his son in their aging kitchen. After Jane returns, the Peters visit Alice and her husband and find out more about the modern conveniences in their new home. George then decides that his entire home needs replacing, and he arranges to buy a new home, complete with his wife's dream kitchen.

== Cast ==
- Marsha Hunt as Alice, Jane's friend
- Darren McGavin as George Peters
- Janet Riley as Jane Peters
- Scott McKay

== Legacy ==
In historical context, this, alongside another sponsored film In the Suburbs, dealt directly with the growth of suburban capitalism.

Mary Jo Pehl and Bridget Nelson of Mystery Science Theater 3000 fame parodied the film via RiffTrax on June 30, 2015 and again live on a MST3K reunion show a year later.

Justin Timberlake's 2013 song "Don't Hold the Wall" samples a small section of dialogue from the film.

== See also ==
- List of American films of 1955
- List of films in the public domain in the United States
