= Crow T. Robot =

Fictional character in Mystery Science Theater 3000

- Mystery Science Theater 3000 character
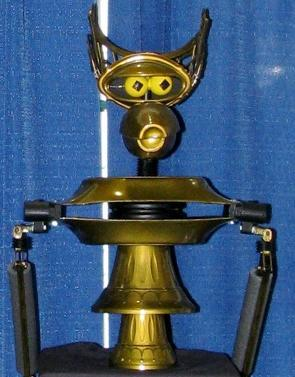
- First appearance: K00 – The Green Slime
- Created by: Joel Hodgson
- Portrayed by: Trace Beaulieu (KTMA season – season 7, The Giant Gila Monster DVD extra, Turkey Day 2014 marathon segments); Bill Corbett (season 8 – 10, MIGIZI Fundraiser Shorts, and MST3K: The RiffTrax Experiments); Hampton Yount (season 11 – 12); Nate Begle (2019 Live Tour – 2022); Kelsey Ann Brady (season 13); Josh Weinstein (KTMA episode Invaders from the Deep)

In-universe information
- Species: Robot
- Gender: Male

Crow The Robot is a fictional character from the American science fiction comedy television series Mystery Science Theater 3000 (MST3K). Crow is a robot, who, along with others, ridicules poor-quality B to Z movies.

== Overview ==
According to the MST3K storyline, Crow – like his fellow robots Tom Servo, Gypsy, and Cambot – was built by Joel Robinson (Joel Hodgson), who created them to help him withstand the torment of watching bad movies on the Satellite of Love (SOL). On the Satellite, Crow was forced with the rest of the crew to watch horrible retro movies sent by mad scientist Dr. Clayton Forrester and his assistants. In episode 814, "Riding with Death", Crow describes himself as being made from molybdenum, and in episode 908 Mike piles rocks atop Crow and comments on his "durable molybdenum frame."

Crow's middle initial stands for "The". In episode #K19: Hangar 18, Joel stated that "Crow" was an acronym for "Cybernetic Remotely Operated Woman", giving Crow a brief identity crisis until Joel revealed he built Crow specifically to play this joke on him. Crow is also sometimes called "Art", but it is primarily by late-series antagonist Pearl Forrester. This arose from a gag in episode 203 Jungle Goddess following a skit centered on the sitcom The Honeymooners, where Joel referred to Crow as "Art Crow" (in reference to Honeymooners co-star Art Carney). After Best Brains received a letter from a child who had evidently missed the cultural reference and labeled a drawing of Crow as "Art" (episode 402, The Giant Gila Monster), the show's writers turned the name into a recurring joke.

Crow was voiced by Trace Beaulieu from the beginning of the series in 1988 until 1996. When Beaulieu was not available, Josh Weinstein performed Crow for an early KTMA episode, Invaders from the Deep. When Beaulieu left the show after season seven, Bill Corbett took over as the voice of the character from the eighth season in 1997 until the tenth season in 1999. Corbett's Crow was noticeably more cynical, irritable, and impatient when viewing the bad movies than Beaulieu's Crow had been. Corbett's Crow also occasionally appeared more unhinged than Beaulieu's incarnation. For example, in episode #902 The Phantom Planet Crow dresses as a Solarite (a monster from the movie played by Richard Kiel) and explains: "Have you guys ever noticed how I'll see a movie, snap, lose control of myself, and then decide I'm one of the characters in the movie, and then go out and dress myself up that way?" (Crow having done this before in episode #820 Space Mutiny as a "Bellerian"). He is voiced by Hampton Yount in the 2017 series revival, and was replaced by Kelsey Ann Brady for the Gizmoplex episodes in 2022. Bill Corbett returned to voice and puppeteer Crow for the 2026 episodes of Season 14, also called Mystery Science Theater 3000: The RiffTrax Experiments.

Crow's accomplishments during the show's run include:

- Writing several screenplays, including Earth vs. Soup (his seminal work) (seen in Earth vs the Spider), Peter Graves at the University of Minnesota (Beginning of the End), The Spy Who Hugged Me (Secret Agent Super Dragon), Chocolate Jones and the Temple of Funk (Angels Revenge), and Crow T. Robot's World War Space (Starcrash). He also wrote a rather poorly researched documentary titled Crow T. Robot's Bram Stoker's The Civil War, and created another called Let's Talk Women!, in which he denies the existence of women (also comparing women to Bigfoot). He also wrote a one man show titled "Robot on the Run". In the revival series, Crow creates a sitcom with Tom called Mad Bots, and later he creates a parody Space Opera title Crow T. Robot's World War Space.
- Being an avid member of the Kim Cattrall and Estelle Winwood fan clubs.
- Co-writing a satirical musical called Supercalifragilisticexpiali-wacky!
- During the Christmas episode #321, Santa Claus Conquers the Martians, he wrote a Christmas carol titled "Let's Have a Patrick Swayze Christmas", inspired by his favorite movie, Road House.
- Though everyone aboard the SOL would like to escape, the cause is almost always the desire for freedom, not a result of the slew of terrible B-movies. But, in episode #903, The Pumaman, Crow actually succumbed to the Mads' experiment. He decided this film had finally pushed him over the edge and that he could no longer stand watching the movies. He attempted to run away, hoping to find a satellite where he would be forced to watch good movies, but gave up on his escape attempt after mere seconds.
- In between segments of the movie Werewolf, he unintentionally turns Mike into a "Werecrow."

In the earlier seasons of the show, he often announced "Ladies and gentlemen, Topo Gigio!" in the voice of Ed Sullivan.

During episode 416, Fire Maidens of Outer Space, Crow acquired a double named "Timmy", to whom the trio quickly took a liking. (Timmy was actually portrayed by the black-painted Crow used for the Shadowrama in the theater.) However, the double began playing tricks on Tom Servo and Joel, who blamed Crow for the actions. He eventually joined them in the theater during the movie and attacked Tom, cocooning him in a material identical to the xenomorph in Alien, forcing Joel (who referenced Aliens by growling, "Let go of him, you bitch!") and Crow to stuff him into an airlock and blast him out of the ship and into space. Timmy's appearance was a parody of the evil twin concept.

Crow holds the distinction of being the only SOL robot to ever visit Deep 13 (although Tom Servo and Gypsy once visited the alternate-earth version and Cambot is directly connected to the Mads' camera): In episode 615, Kitten with a Whip, he slid down the Umbilicus in an attempt to bring the SOL back to Earth, only to be frightened back up by Dr. Forrester (who then had Frank put a giant mousetrap beneath the Umbilicus). In the "Turkey Day" version of episode 701, Night of the Blood Beast, Crow attended the Forrester Thanksgiving dinner alongside such guests as Mr. B Natural, Pitch the Devil, and others. During this episode, Crow seems to have a friendship with Pearl Forrester, who seems to enjoy his company and the fact he would listen to her complain about her inept son, Dr. Forrester.

In the theatrical film based on the series, Crow distinguishes himself early on by attempting to tunnel back to Earth using a pickaxe. Even he admits the faulty logic employed in this scheme when he examines his calculations: "Well, look at that! 'Breach hull, all die' – I even had it underlined!" / "Well, believe me, Mike, I calculated the odds of this succeeding versus the odds I was doing something incredibly stupid, and... I went ahead anyway."

A running joke of Crow's character throughout the series, particularly in the last few seasons of the Sci-Fi channel's running of the show, is his frequent costume changes into film characters during the host segments. Often Crow has been known to take on the appearance and sometimes the personality of one of the characters in the movie that is currently being shown, usually ending with Mike, Tom Servo, or Joel using Crow's role-playing as a plot device or setup to a joke that mocks the film even more. As previously mentioned, this continuing effect finally was recognized by Crow himself during Episode 902, The Phantom Planet.

Another recurring joke that was more prominent during the earlier seasons of the series – dating, in fact, from the KTMA days – was Crow's apparent inability to distinguish between different types of animal; he would joyfully cry "Kitty!" when an animal appeared on screen, regardless of whether it was at all feline, and regardless of whether it was even cute enough to elicit such a positive response.

In Mystery Science Theater 3000: The Comic, Crow along with the other Bots and Jonah Heston were sent into the comics thanks to Kinga's new invention the Bubbulat-R. While Tom Servo was sent into Johnny Jason, Teen Reporter and Jonah was sent into Black Cat, Crow was sent into Horrific but then the effects of the comic started to make Crow succumb a comic disease called four-color fever and turns into a monster called "the Crow-Keeper" which eventually starts to threaten his relationship with Jonah and the other Bots and Kinga's plan in conquering comic media.

In the season 13 premiere Santo in the Treasure of Dracula, Crow is given the ability to blink by Jonah.

Crow spoke the final line of dialogue when the original series ended in 1999. ("This movie looks kind of familiar doesn't it?"; Season 10 episode 13: "Diabolik")

== Behind the scenes ==
Crow is a gold-colored puppet composed of, among other things, a soap dish eye cowl, ping pong ball eyes, a split plastic bowling pin mouth, a lacrosse face mask webbing (Cooper XL7-FG), and Tupperware panels for the body. The original puppet for Crow was built by Joel Hodgson in a single night before filming the pilot episode. At the beginning of Season One, the puppet was redesigned and built by Trace Beaulieu, adding a second Tupperware tray to Crow's torso as well as movable eyes. Another version of Crow is used for the theater segments. This version is painted flat black. Of all the bots, Crow was the least changed from his KTMA incarnation to when the series became nationally broadcast. He is the only one who retained his general primary color.

Trace Beaulieu operated Crow in the initial KTMA season and throughout the Comedy Channel/Comedy Central years of seasons 1–7, as well as in Mystery Science Theater 3000: The Movie. During KTMA and season 1, Trace slowly refined Crow's voice. Originally, it was somewhat babyish, with a pronounced Minnesota accent. By season two, Crow's voice had become more sharp. Upon Trace's departure, Brooklyn-raised Bill Corbett took over Crow's operation. Corbett jokingly mentioned that during his time alone on the SOL, Crow suffered a stroke, thus explaining the change of his voice and his initially less-than-graceful handling of the puppet. Despite initial concerns from the fanbase regarding Beaulieu's departure, the reception for Corbett's performance was very positive and he quickly became a fan favorite. The show's writers later made a joke of the change in episode 904, Werewolf, by suggesting that Crow's inherent characteristics included a change of voice every seven years. When Joel Hodgson returned for a guest spot in episode 1001, Soultaker, he offhandedly suggests that Crow "changed his bowling pin" (that is, his mouth). From Season 8 onward, in the opening theme during the "Robot Roll Call", Crow can be heard exclaiming "I'm different!"

Many first-time viewers of the series are confused by Crow's appearance during the movie segments. Only the outline of his head can be seen, and (due to multistable perception) it can appear as if Crow is facing toward the viewer. This phenomenon was addressed in The Mystery Science Theater 3000 Amazing Colossal Episode Guide with illustrations comparing Crow to a Necker cube.

At Dragon Con in 2009, Beaulieu and Corbett made a joint appearance for a "Crow vs. Crow" panel discussion, in which they discussed their respective work with the character. The discussion is included as a bonus feature on the Mystery Science Theater 3000: Vol. XX DVD set from Shout! Factory.

For the series revival, a new Crow was built with much larger hands, controlled with arm rods, similar to Kermit the Frog. This makes the puppeteering more complicated; as such, two puppeteers are dedicated to Crow, with Yount controlling the opening and closing of Crow's beak and providing the voice off-camera.

== Appearances in other media ==
- An episode of Futurama entitled "Raging Bender" has the gang visiting the theater, where Fry mockingly riffs on a newsreel intro before being shushed by the silhouette of a rather testy Crow-like robot ironically saying "Don't talk during the movie!"; beside him is a Tom Servo-resembling robot.
- In the Archie Comics series Sonic the Hedgehog, issue #52, Sonic is sent into a 1920s variation of Mobius. In searching for the handheld computer Nicole, Sonic does battle with a number of robots, three of them resembling Crow T. Robot, Tom Servo and Cambot.
- In an issue of Star Wars Tales, Crow and Tom (with his cylinder head) are seen in the foreground of a comedic tale written by Peter David, starring a perky Force-using droid. He also appears in Tag and Bink: Revenge of the Clone Menace, along with Tom Servo and Gypsy.
- The June 8 2007 edition of the Cat And Girl comic features Crow as the President of South Vietnam.
- Trace Beaulieu reprised his role of Crow for a brief cameo appearance in two episodes of the fourth season of Arrested Development, along with Joel.

== Crow Syndrome ==
The "Crow Syndrome" is a frequent joke on the show and MSTings, wherein Crow chimes in with an off-topic and/or excessively lewd comment and the other two reprimand him, often bemusedly and perturbedly shouting "Crow!" in response. "Crow Syndrome" is a general term, and is used in MSTings that do not feature Crow or other regular characters.
