= Cinematic Titanic =

- Cinematic Titanic logo
- Written by: Joel Hodgson; Trace Beaulieu; Frank Conniff; Mary Jo Pehl; J. Elvis Weinstein
- Starring: Joel Hodgson; Trace Beaulieu; Frank Conniff; Mary Jo Pehl; J. Elvis Weinstein
- Distributed by: Cinematic Titanic
- Release date: December 22, 2007
- Running time: Approx. 90 min.
- Country: United States
- Language: English

Cinematic Titanic was a project by Mystery Science Theater 3000 (MST3K) creator and original host, Joel Hodgson. The project involved "riffing" B-movies, in a manner similar to that of MST3K. Joining Hodgson were some of the original MST3K cast, as well as some cast members who joined later in the show's run. These included Trace Beaulieu, J. Elvis Weinstein, Frank Conniff and Mary Jo Pehl. It was first performed live on December 7, 2007, and first aired on December 22, 2007.

On February 16, 2013, it was announced that the touring portion of Cinematic Titanic was going on an indefinite hiatus. According to an email sent out to members of the site, due to "5 people living in 5 different cities with different lives and projects, it has become increasingly difficult to coordinate our schedules and give Cinematic Titanic the attention it requires to keep growing as a creative enterprise and a business." The final tour began on September 23, 2013.

== Description ==
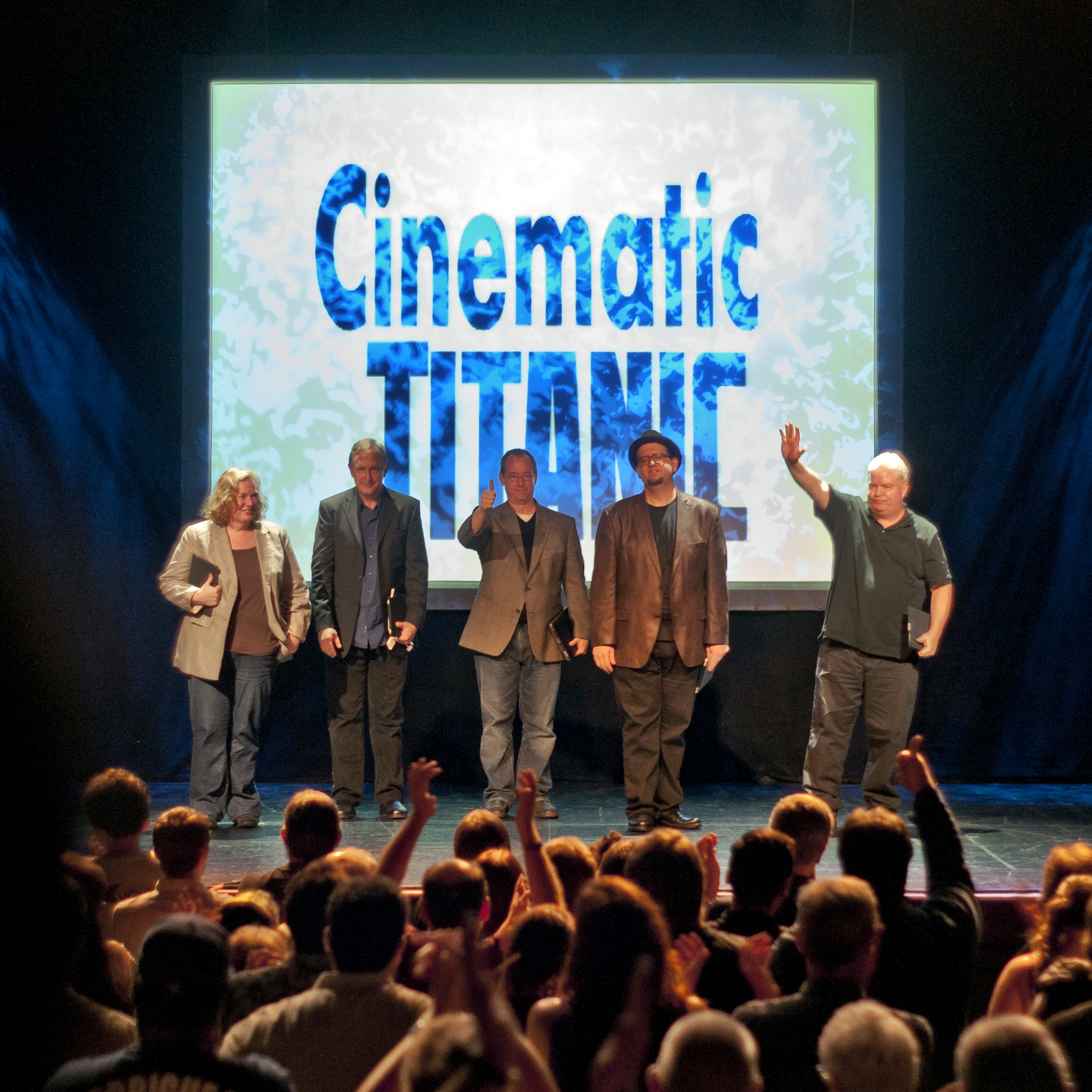
The cast of Cinematic Titanic at a live show

Like Mystery Science Theater 3000, the series used black silhouettes of the riffers placed over the films, but in the case of Cinematic Titanic they sit on both sides of the screen rather than just on the lower right. Visual gags are frequent (such as Beaulieu's use of a cherry picker in The Oozing Skull), and there are two or three host segments per episode, all performed in silhouette.

=== Plot ===
The actors essentially play themselves as they participate in an experiment for some unknown (possibly shadowy) corporation or military force. The story currently provided to the cast is that there is a tear in the "electron scaffolding" that threatens all digital media in the world. Their experience doing MST3K is key to the organization's plans. The riffing for each film is recorded to a "nanotated disc" and inserted into a "Time Tube" by Hodgson that descends into the frame at the end of every episode. The unknown organization is very firm on keeping the cast focused on their duties, providing no time frame for completion and requiring them to stay within the facilities at all times. They apparently have massive resources and an autonomous military force, which they use to keep the cast in line. The cast is inquisitive of the true purpose of the experiments but have no major problems as, aside from having to watch bad movies, they are well-treated.

When the cast switched to performing for live audiences, the "corporation" premise was abandoned.

=== Relation to RiffTrax ===
When asked about potential collaborations with those involved in RiffTrax, Hodgson told New York magazine, "I don't know. I think those guys—Bill, Kevin and Mike—are really talented, obviously. I think anything’s possible, but I thought it might get confusing to try to merge them together or do crossover projects. I would never rule it out because it's all kind of the same universe. But RiffTrax, the idea of riffing on topical movies, is a different thing. And I like that the movie-riffing universe got bigger when they decided to do that, but we just do weird movies you've never seen before."

=== Studio / "Live" DVDs ===
The cast riff on the movie East Meets Watts at a live show in NYC

In a question and answer session at the Tivoli Theatre in St. Louis, Missouri, it was announced that Cinematic Titanic would begin to release recordings from their live shows as "Live" DVDs in an effort to bring the energy of their on stage antics into people's living rooms and further promote the stage show. When asked if this meant the demise of the studio produced DVDs, J. Elvis Weinstein said, "No, studio releases will return at some point in the future." The first of these "Live" DVDs to be released was East Meets Watts, which was recorded in front of a live audience during one of the group's performances in Los Angeles.

== Releases ==
The first live performance was a private show for employees of Industrial Light & Magic on December 7, 2007. Afterwards, the cast reworked some jokes, delaying the original December 10 release date. The first episode of Cinematic Titanic was released on DVD to the public at midnight on December 21, via the download-to-burn company EZTakes. According to the Cinematic Titanic website, due to rights issues, the episode was not available for download until April 2, 2008.

Both the private show and the first release feature the B-movie Brain of Blood. One of the original film's producers, concerned that creating multiple versions of the film could create marketplace confusion, requested that Cinematic Titanic's version have a different name. To alleviate his concerns, Cinematic Titanic retitled their release The Oozing Skull.

In March 2013, Cinematic Titanic sold the last of their on-hand DVD stock and ceased pressing their own discs. From then on all releases were either in digital format, or through Amazon.com's print-on-demand service.

In May 2017, Shout! Factory released a Complete Series set, featuring all twelve episodes.

=== Release list ===
Releases have been available to purchase as a physical DVD, and also as a download and burned DVD version.

Movie	CT Released	Original Release	Notes
The Oozing Skull	December 21, 2007	1972	Original release called Brain of Blood
The Doomsday Machine	June 19, 2008	1972	
The Wasp Woman	August 7, 2008	October 30, 1959	A film by the "B-Movie King" Roger Corman
Legacy of Blood	October 9, 2008	March 17, 1971	Original release called Blood Legacy.
Santa Claus Conquers the Martians	November 20, 2008	November 14, 1964	The film had previously appeared on an episode of MST3K and was later done by Rifftrax.
Frankenstein's Castle of Freaks	January 8, 2009	February 19, 1974	
Blood of the Vampires	March 19, 2009	1966	Original release called Whisper to the Wind.
East Meets Watts	December 16, 2009	May 1974	First DVD featuring a live performance rather than a studio version. The film was titled The Dynamite Brothers at the live shows.
The Alien Factor	February 23, 2010	1976	Second DVD to feature a live performance.
Danger on Tiki Island	June 15, 2010	1968	Third live DVD; originally titled Brides of Blood.
War of the Insects	December 2, 2011	November 9, 1968	Also known as Genocide.
Rattlers	July 17, 2012	April 23, 1976	

== List of live shows ==
The following is an incomplete list of live performances by Cinematic Titanic.

Date	Movie	City	State	Notes
December 7, 2007	The Oozing Skull	San Francisco	CA	Private show for Industrial Light & Magic employees.
April 26, 2008	The Wasp Woman	Dallas	TX	Public show (sold out) as part of the 2008 USA Film Festival in Dallas, Texas, at the Angelika Film Center, Dallas. The crew, sitting in the front row of the theater, with microphones and scripts, announced that the performance was being recorded for an upcoming DVD release. They signed autographs for the enthusiastic crowd after the show.
June 21, 2008	The Doomsday Machine	Hollywood	CA	Public show (sold out) as part of the 2008 LA Film Festival in Hollywood, California, at the John Anson Ford Amphitheatre. Movie shown was scheduled to be The Wasp Woman, but changed without prior announcement to The Doomsday Machine. No screen interaction, the team sat onstage with their scripts.
October 25, 2008	Blood of the Vampires	Minneapolis	MN	Public show at the State Theatre in Minneapolis, Minnesota. The movie Blood of the Vampires was shown for the first time. Dave (Gruber) Allen was the warm-up act.
November 1, 2008	Santa Claus Conquers the Martians	St. Charles	MO	Public show at the Family Arena in St. Charles, MO. Santa Claus Conquers the Martians was the film shown, and Dave (Gruber) Allen performed as the warm-up act.
December 18, 2008	Santa Claus Conquers the Martians	Chicago	IL	Public three-night series in Chicago, IL at the Lakeshore Theater. The December 18 show at 7:30pm featured Santa Claus Conquers the Martians, the December 19 shows at 7:30pm and 10:30pm featured Blood of the Vampires, and the December 20 shows at 7:30pm and 10:30pm featured Frankenstein’s Castle of Freaks. The latter two movies were promoted as 'Unreleased Titles' until a few days before their Chicago appearance. All five shows were reportedly sold out, according to J. Elvis Weinstein through the Cinematic Titanic email Newsletter. Dave (Gruber) Allen performed as the warm-up act. As this appearance marked the first anniversary of Cinematic Titanic, a "Best of" reel was shown after each performance.
December 19, 2008	Blood of the Vampires	Chicago	IL	7:30 pm show
December 19, 2008	Blood of the Vampires	Chicago	IL	10:30 pm show
December 20, 2008	Frankenstein's Castle of Freaks	Chicago	IL	7:30 pm show
December 20, 2008	Frankenstein's Castle of Freaks	Chicago	IL	10:30 pm show
February 13, 2009	Blood of the Vampires	San Francisco	CA	One public show at the Marine's Memorial Auditorium in San Francisco, CA.
February 14, 2009	East Meets Watts	San Francisco	CA	East Meets Watts was billed as Dynamite Brothers. Dave (Gruber) Allen performed as the warm-up act, the "Best of" reel was shown.
February 19, 2009	War of the Insects	Royal Oak	MI	Two public shows at the Royal Oak Music Theatre in Royal Oak, MI. The first show was War of The Insects, followed by Samson and The Seven Miracles of The World. 30 minutes into the first film, the screen went black. Music Theatre staff scrambled for 5 minutes or so to re-establish visuals, giving the group time to ad-lib (most commonly at Detroit's expense). Dave (Gruber) Allen performed as the warm-up act.
February 19, 2009	Samson and the Seven Miracles of the World	Royal Oak	MI	
February 20, 2009	Blood of the Vampires	Somerville	MA	Two public shows at the Somerville Theatre in Somerville, MA. The February 20 show featured Blood of the Vampires. The February 21 show featured Dynamite Brothers. Both shows were sold out, according to an on-stage announcement. Dave (Gruber) Allen performed as the warm-up act, the "Best of" reel was shown.
February 21, 2009	East Meets Watts	Somerville	MA	
February 27, 2009	Blood of the Vampires	Cleveland	OH	The Hanna Theatre
February 28, 2009	East Meets Watts	Cleveland	OH	The Hanna Theatre
March 7, 2009	East Meets Watts	Austin	TX	The Paramount
March 13, 2009	Blood of the Vampires	Seattle	WA	King Cat Theater
March 14, 2009	East Meets Watts	Seattle	WA	King Cat Theater
May 22, 2009	East Meets Watts	Mesa	AZ	Two public shows at the Mesa Arts Center, Dynamite Brothers billed as East Meets Watts, and Brides of Blood billed as Danger on Tiki Island, with Dave (Gruber) Allen and the "Best of" reel.
May 23, 2009	Danger on Tiki Island	Mesa	AZ	
June 12, 2009	The Alien Factor	Philadelphia	PA	Two public shows at the Trocadero Theater in Philadelphia, PA, with The Alien Factor and Brides of Blood billed as Danger on Tiki Island, with Dave (Gruber) Allen and the "Best of" reel.
June 13, 2009	Danger on Tiki Island	Philadelphia	PA	
September 10, 2009	East Meets Watts	Chicago	IL	Three public shows at the Lakeshore Theater in Chicago, IL, with East Meets Watts (movie title of Dynamite Brothers), The Alien Factor, and Brides of Blood billed as Danger on Tiki Island, with Dave (Gruber) Allen and the "Best of" reel.
September 11, 2009	The Alien Factor	Chicago	IL	
September 12, 2009	Danger on Tiki Island	Chicago	IL	
December 31, 2009	War of the Insects/Samson and the Seven Miracles of the World/Legacy of Blood	Glenside	PA	A 3 movie marathon performed in Glenside, PA at the Keswick Theatre. Performed on New Year's Eve, the first two movies were performed before midnight, and the third after midnight. Dave (Gruber) Allen opened.
January 30, 2010	Danger on Tiki Island	San Francisco	CA	One public show at the Castro Theatre in San Francisco, CA. Warm-up material provided by Dave (Gruber) Allen, Frank Coniff, and Josh Weinstein.
February 20, 2010	War of the Insects	Milwaukee	WI	Two public shows in Milwaukee, WI at Turner Hall. The 7:00pm show featured Genocide billed as War of the Insects, and was sold out, according to the Turner Hall website, and an announcement at the start of the show. This show is notable not only as a return for Joel to his home state of Wisconsin (he was born in Stevens Point, and grew up in Fort Atkinson and Green Bay,) but also because it was his 50th birthday. The enthusiastic crowd sang "Happy Birthday to You" for him. The 10:30pm show featured Samson and the 7 Miracles. Dave (Gruber) Allen performed as the warm-up act, with a special appearance at the 10:30pm show by actor/comedian Patton Oswalt, who had just finished performing in town, and was recommended to come see the performance. Oswalt gave a short opener prior to the start of the film. Cast members were on hand to sign autographs after both shows.
February 20, 2010	Samson and the Seven Miracles of the World	Milwaukee	WI	
April 15, 2010	Danger on Tiki Island	Northampton	MA	One public show at the Calvin Theater in Northampton, MA with Brides of Blood billed as Danger on Tiki Island, Dave (Gruber) Allen performed as the warm-up act.
April 16, 2010	War of the Insects	Princeton	NJ	One sold-out public shows at the McCarter Theatre in Princeton, NJ, with Genocide billed as War of the Insects.
April 17, 2010	Danger on Tiki Island	Manhattan, New York City	NY	One sold out public show at the Nokia Theater in Manhattan, NY, with Brides of Blood billed as Danger on Tiki Island, with Dave (Gruber).
August 3, 2010	War of the Insects	San Francisco	CA	One public show at the Castro Theatre in San Francisco, CA. Warmup material by Mary Jo Pehl & Dave Gruber, Frank Conniff, and Trace Beaulieu & J. Elvis Weinstein.
October 15, 2010	War of the Insects	Washington	DC	Lisner Auditorium, George Washington University
October 29, 2010	Rattlers	Boston	MA	One public show at the Wilbur Theatre in Boston, MA, where they premiered their treatment of the movie Rattlers.
November 13, 2010	Rattlers	St. Charles	MO	One public show at the Family Arena in St. Charles, MO.
January 29, 2011	The Alien Factor	Concord	NH	Two public shows at the Chubb Theatre in Concord, NH, where patrons could buy tickets for either an early (7:00PM) show or a late (9:30PM) show. There was a discounted "double feature" price for those wanting to see both shows. The early show was the movie The Alien Factor and the late show was the movie Genocide billed as War of the Insects. J. Elvis Weinstein, Frank Conniff, Trace Beaulieu and Mary Jo Pehl, in that order, all performed warmup material.
January 29, 2011	War of the Insects	Concord	NH	
February 19, 2011	Rattlers	Milwaukee	WI	One public show at the Pabst Theater
March 30, 2011	Blood of the Vampires	Newark	NJ	One public show at the Victoria Theatre.
March 31, 2011	The Doomsday Machine	Newark	NJ	Two public shows at the Victoria Theatre.
March 31, 2011	The Astral Factor	Newark	NJ	
April 19, 2011	The Alien Factor	Princeton	NJ	One public show at the McCarter Theatre in Princeton, NJ with The Alien Factor and warmup material from the cast, including a live performance of the Mystery Science Theater 3000 theme song.
May 6, 2011	Samson and the Seven Miracles of the World	San Francisco	CA	Two public shows at the Castro Theatre in San Francisco, CA. The early show was Samson and the 7 Miracles of the World; the late show was Rattlers. Warmup material by Mary Jo Pehl & Dave Gruber, Frank Conniff, and Trace Beaulieu & J. Elvis Weinstein, finishing up with a performance of the MST theme song by Hodgson and Weinstein.
May 6, 2011	Rattlers	San Francisco	CA	
October 15, 2011	Frankenstein's Castle of Freaks	Elgin	IL	Elgin Community College Arts Center (Double Feature with Frankenstein's Castle of Freaks at 7:30 p.m. and Blood of the Vampires at 10:00 p.m.)
October 15, 2011	Blood of the Vampires	Elgin	IL	Elgin Community College Arts Center (Double Feature with Frankenstein's Castle of Freaks at 7:30 p.m. and Blood of the Vampires at 10:00 p.m.)
October 27, 2011	Rattlers	Washington	DC	Lisner Auditorium, George Washington University
November 3, 2011	Rattlers	Reno	NV	Nightingale Concert Hall, University of Nevada, Reno. Warmup material by Mary Jo Pehl, Frank Conniff, Trace Beaulieu, J. Elvis Weinstein and Joel Hodgson, finishing up with a performance of the MST theme song by Weinstein. A meet and greet followed the performance.
January 20, 2012	Rattlers	York	PA	One public show at the Strand-Capitol Performing Arts Theater in York, PA. Warmup material by Mary Jo Pehl, Dave Gruber, Frank Conniff, Trace Beaulieu, J. Elvis Weinstein and Joel Hodgson, finishing up with a performance of the MST theme song by Weinstein. A Meet & Greet followed the performance.
July 5, 2012	Rattlers	Ann Arbor	MI	
July 5, 2012	The Doll Squad	Ann Arbor	MI	100th Cinematic Titanic performance and world premiere of The Doll Squad.
August 19, 2012	The Doll Squad	Beverly Hills	CA	Part of the Everything Is Festival at the Saban Theatre.
November 17, 2012	The Doll Squad	St. Charles	MO	Public show at the Family Arena in St. Charles, MO. The Doll Squad was the film shown, and Dave (Gruber) Allen performed as the warm-up act.
May 31, 2013	The Astral Factor	Arlington	VA	7:30 PM show at the Arlington Drafthouse
May 31, 2013	The Wasp Woman	Arlington	VA	10:00 PM show at the Arlington Drafthouse
June 1, 2013	The Doll Squad	Arlington	VA	7:30 PM show at the Arlington Drafthouse
June 1, 2013	Danger on Tiki Island	Arlington	VA	10:00 PM show at the Arlington Drafthouse
October 19, 2013	The Doll Squad	San Francisco	CA	Two public shows at the Castro Theatre in San Francisco, CA. The early show was The Doll Squad; the late show was The Astral Factor. Joel Hodgson, Mary Jo Pehl, Dave (Gruber) Allen, Frank Conniff, and Trace Beaulieu. J. Elvis Weinstein was not present as he was suffering from cancer and had a kidney removed not long after. Dave (Gruber) Allen took over Weinstein's riffs during both performances.
October 19, 2013	The Astral Factor	San Francisco	CA	Warm-up material by Joel Hodgson, Mary Jo Pehl, Dave (Gruber) Allen, Frank Conniff, and Trace Beaulieu. Warm-up also included a showing of the short film The Frank, starring many Dave (Gruber) Allen and former Mystery Science Theater 3000 cast members including Trace Beaulieu, Frank Conniff, Mary Jo Pehl, Bill Corbett, and Beth "Beez" McKeever. J. Elvis Weinstein was not present as he was suffering from cancer and had a kidney removed not long after. Dave (Gruber) Allen took over Weinstein's riffs during both performances.
November 1, 2013	The Wasp Woman	Concord	NH	Capital Center For The Arts (7pm show)
November 1, 2013	The Doll Squad	Concord	NH	Capital Center For The Arts (9:30pm show)
November 2, 2013	The Astral Factor	Northampton	MA	Calvin Theater (8pm show)
November 3, 2013	The Doll Squad	Boston	MA	Wilbur Theatre (7pm show)
December 30, 2013	The Wasp Woman and The Doll Squad	Glenside	PA	Keswick Theatre (farewell performance)

== See also ==
- The Film Crew
