= Hampton Yount =

American comedian

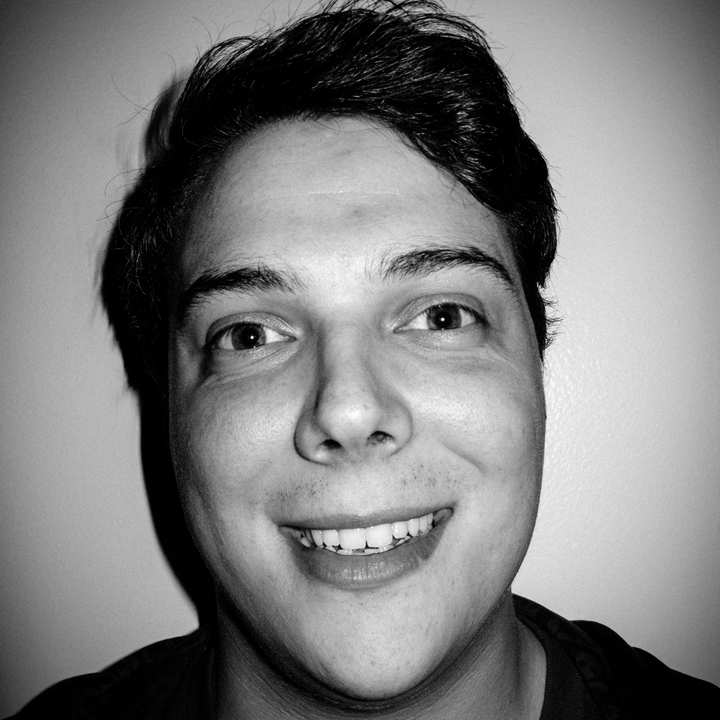
- Born: June 14, 1984 (age 42); Warrenton, Virginia, U.S.
- Occupations: Comedian; writer; actor
- Spouse: Georgea Brooks (m. 2019)
- Children: 2
- Website: www.hamptonyount.com

Hampton Yount (/jʌnt/; born June 14, 1984) is an American stand-up comedian, writer, and actor, known for Mystery Science Theater 3000.

Yount was born in Warrenton, Virginia, to Renee and Victor Yount. Hampton has three siblings, Virginia, Henri and Clay, whom he has talked about on his podcast, Y'all Ever. Clay also appeared on "Doom Island", another one of Hampton's several podcasts, in April 2021. From 2004 to 2012, he and his brother Clay produced a webcomic, Rob and Elliot, for the Boxcar Comics collective. His brother, Clay, continues to make comics and publish them on his website. He first performed stand-up comedy in Blacksburg, Virginia and Washington, D.C., before moving to Los Angeles.

== Podcasts ==
Hampton currently hosts multiple podcasts, including Doom Island and Y'all Ever, which Hampton paused in March 2021. He also hosted Suicide Buddies, which is no longer running. Yount currently records Y'all Ever with Dave Ross, a Los Angeles comedian. On Y'all Ever, Hampton and Dave talk about current events, Hampton's neighbors, and stories sent in by listeners. Doom Island is a podcast hosted by Hampton alone, though he does invite guests. Doom Island has some acting aspects, as Yount pretends to be stranded on an island with 'Doom Bots', fictional characters of Yount's creation. Suicide Buddies is a podcast co-hosted by Hampton, but also co-hosted by Dave Ross. On Suicide Buddies, Hampton and Dave read a suicide story from history on each episode. Yount has been featured on a number of comedy podcasts, including Pete Holmes' You Made It Weird with Pete Holmes and Doug Benson's Getting Doug with High. Yount received his own half-hour Comedy Central special in 2015.

== Acting career ==
His first experience in television was as a consulting producer and performer on MTV's Ridiculousness. Yount has been featured on Conan, Last Comic Standing, and Comedy Central's The Meltdown with Jonah and Kumail. In 2015, Yount was selected by Joel Hodgson to provide the voice of Crow T. Robot on the revived Mystery Science Theater 3000 Netflix series. Yount's selection came at the recommendation of new host Jonah Ray. The role was previously played by Trace Beaulieu and Bill Corbett. Yount also played the lead role in a pilot titled "Man of Truth". The pilot was not picked up, "...probably because it was very stupid.", Yount said on his Twitter page.

== Personal life ==
Hampton talks about his childhood on Y'all Ever and Alison Rosen is Your New Best Friend. He sometimes mentions his poor school experience and his father's profession as a gem dealer. Hampton married Georgea Brooks, a comedian and actor. He and his wife welcomed a son in 2022. Hampton's parents divorced, a topic he has talked about on his podcast "Y'all Ever".
