= A Visit to Santa =

- Produced by: Clem Williams
- Distributed by: Clem Williams Films
- Release date: December 1963
- Running time: 12 minutes
- Country: United States
- Language: English

A Visit to Santa is a 12-minute live action American children's Christmas film produced for distribution at the end of 1963. Other than the opening text, "CLEM WILLIAMS FILMS presents A Visit To Santa", there are no other credits.

== Plot ==
After "Jingle Bells" melody, played on a small Hammond Organ with chimes, is heard during the brief opening credits, two children, who appear to be five or six years old, are seen in a bunk bed almost unintelligibly saying goodnight to their mother. The boy, Dick, is in the upper bunk and the girl, Ann, who is in the lower bunk, says, "oh, Dick, I wonder if Santa ever got our letter".

The visuals become blurry and a male narrator states, "yes, Ann, far up in the North Pole, Santa is reading your letter now". In a spacious living room setting, seated in a large easy chair and dressed in full traditional apparel, Santa is holding a sheet of paper which is shown in close-up to depict, in large-lettered children's handwriting, "Dear Santa / DicK and I would LiKe To visiT You. / CouLD we PLEase visit you at The NoRTH PoLE beFore CHriSTmAs ? / DicK And ANN".

Upon reading the letter, Santa says, "Why not" and calls elf Toby to prepare the magic helicopter and bring the two children to him. Toby responds, "your'all words are my command, Santa". Appearing in Dick and Ann's bedroom, Toby awakens them with the words, "hurry up and get dressed and we will fly to Santa", as the narrator explains to the audience, "it's just a short hop in the magic helicopter".

Walking through a castle-style entrance inscribed "Santa", Toby leads Dick and Ann into Santa's living room and is then dismissed by Santa who, still seated in his large easy chair, takes the children onto his lap, as documentary footage of seasonal celebrations and Santa pageantry appears on the screen, with the narrator recounting how Christmas is observed in various cities and towns. A Christmas parade, with main focus on Santa, is seen in the Pennsylvania city of McKeesport. Santa gives Dick and Ann a tour of "The Village Toy Shop" which appears as a series of Christmas doll and toy exhibits as well as displays in a large department store. Santa then leads them to his toy warehouse where preparations are made for Christmas Eve distribution.

At the end of the visit, Santa shows them an elaborate model train display, as the narrator says, "I wonder if Ann will be as excited as Dick. There's trains of all kinds, coming and going, starting and stopping, logging trains, freight trains, streamliners, old-time choo-choos — I'll bet daddy would enjoy this too". As part of the train exhibit, an elaborate miniaturized mockup is also on display depicting an entire town through which a circus parade is passing.

As Toby returns to Santa's living room in preparation for taking the children home, Santa, continuing to sit in his easy chair, tells Dick and Ann, "So glad you came... the entire Christmas celebration is to commemorate the birth of Jesus Christ hundreds of years and the wonderful spirit of Christmas...". Toby then leads the children towards the front camera and out of range, as Santa turns in his chair and, addressing the audience, exclaims, "Merry Christmas! Merry Christmas to all! Merry Christmas!", with "The END" slide placed on the screen to the sound of the calliope "Jingle Bells".

== Background ==
Produced by Pittsburgh-based Clem Williams films, the short was shot in McKeesport, with the toy section of the city's department store, The Famous, serving as Santa's Workshop, and in Pittsburgh, where Christmas toy displays of various stores are used to augment the oversized imagery of Santa's North Pole workshop. There is very little ambient dialogue — the soundtrack primarily consists of holiday music and the narrator's voice, with much of the narration presented in the form of rhymed or free verse.

== Legacy ==
It has since garnered a reputation as a camp classic due to multiple airings on Turner Classic Movies.

It was spoofed by RiffTrax on December 19, 2007.
