= Tom Servo =

Fictional character in Mystery Science Theater 3000

- Mystery Science Theater 3000 character
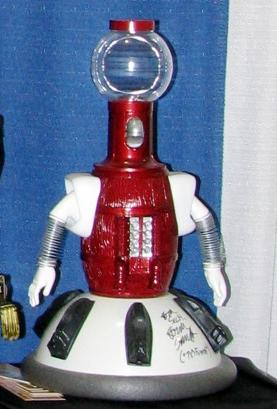
- First appearance: K00 – The Green Slime (as Beeper); K02 – Revenge of the Mysterons from Mars (as Tom Servo)
- Created by: Joel Hodgson
- Voiced by: Kevin Murphy (seasons 2 – 10, Mystery Science Theater: The RiffTrax Experiments); Josh Weinstein (KTMA season – 1, Turkey Day 2014 marathon segments); James Moore (webisodes); Frank Conniff (The Giant Gila Monster DVD extra); Baron Vaughn (season 11 – 13); Conor McGiffin (2019 Live Tour – 2022)

In-universe information
- Species: Robot
- Gender: Male

Tom Servo is a fictional character from the American science fiction comedy television show Mystery Science Theater 3000 (MST3K). Tom is one of two wise-cracking, robotic main characters of the show, built by Joel Robinson to act as a companion and help stave off madness as he was forced to watch low-quality films (Tom and the other bots, Crow, Gypsy, and Cambot, are made from parts that would have otherwise allowed Joel to actually control the film). At least during the Comedy Central era, he was somewhat more mature than his theatre companion, Crow T. Robot. Tom, more often than the others, signals the need to exit the theater to perform host segments.

== Overview ==
Tom Servo is a red puppet that has a gumball machine (Carousel Executive Snack Dispenser) for a head, a body composed of a toy "Money Lover Barrel" coin bank and a toy car engine block, and a bowl-shaped hovercraft skirt (a Halloween "Boo Bowl") instead of legs. His arm assembly (according to the 1998 MST3K Official Bot Builders Booklet Workbench Edition) is from a Mr. Moonie doll. Mr. Moonie (sometimes known as "Seymour Bunz" or "C More Bunz") was a gag doll popular during the time of filming, usually found suction cupped to people's car windows to moon other drivers. The doll would drop its pants and moon people when a rubber bladder was squeezed. The entire assembly, including the rubber bladder, were kept intact when installed into Tom's barrel body. The hands were apparently from a clown or hobo doll figure, but are now made from a mold. The springs were custom made by a local manufacturer, which were attached with glue to the wrists and arms. His arms would spring up and down whenever the clear balloon inside was gripped by Kevin, as shown in pictures from The Colossal Episode Guide or The Scrapbook tape. The Patrick Swayze Christmas segment shows Kevin in the puppet trench working Tom Servo with bladder in each hand. Although the other characters comment occasionally throughout the series that his arms are not functional, they actually do move up and down due to the Mr Moonie doll bladder inside Tom, and can be seen moving up and down in a fair few episodes as early as season 2. His shoulders are made from the front of an Eveready Floating Lantern. Because Servo's head is transparent, chromakeyed images appear projected through it, and thus a second puppet was built for use in the theater segments, entirely spray-painted black. This black Servo also appeared in a host segment in episode #609, "The Skydivers". Tom moves about by hovering. In seasons one through ten he is unable to hover much higher than the ground, however in season eleven (and briefly in the film version) he is capable of hovering at apparently any height and with great agility. In episode #413 "Manhunt in Space" it is revealed that Servo suffers from red-green colorblindness.

Servo's appearance has changed over time. In the pilot for MST3K, the robot who would become Servo was named "Beeper", who just spoke in beeps that only Crow could understand (similar to R2-D2 from the Star Wars films). He was an all-silver robot vaguely shaped like the ultimate Servo, with funnel-shaped shoulders, silver rubber tube arms, a plastic flowerpot for a hoverskirt, and a small fishbowl for a head. He was renamed 'Servo' after a vending machine called the Servotron. The character was absent in K01: Invaders from the Deep, but re-appeared again for the remainder of the KTMA series as the now-familiar Servo puppet with the gumball machine head in K02: Revenge of the Mysterons from Mars.

In Season 1 on the Comedy Channel, he was given a red color, longer black tube arms, squared white shoulders, a different hoverskirt, and the Carousel Snack Dispenser gumball machine head with a white beak. Around episode 105: The Corpse Vanishes, Servo's head was replaced with a slightly modified version of his "Carousel" head. The "neck" was slightly wider and the beak (now silver at this point) appeared smaller. This version of Servo's head would be used for the remainder of Season 1. For Season 2, the black tubing used for his arms was replaced by a pair of small silver springs and the more familiar Carousel Dispenser head design (KTMA/pre episode 105) returned with a silver beak. This physical form was pretty much the same throughout the remainder of the series, save for a brief flirtation (during episodes #205: Rocket Attack USA and #206: Ring of Terror) with a slim cylindrical gumball-machine head to try to reduce the screen area Servo's head obscured. It was introduced as a "haircut" that Joel gave Servo, but was quickly abandoned. By mid season 3 an extra cap from another Carousel Dispenser was added just below the "bubble" making Tom's head appear slightly taller and slimmer. Briefly in early season 4, Servo's white hands were changed to beige before returning to white after only a few episodes. During a host segment in the Sci-Fi era, he briefly acquired the body of a "beautiful butterfly."

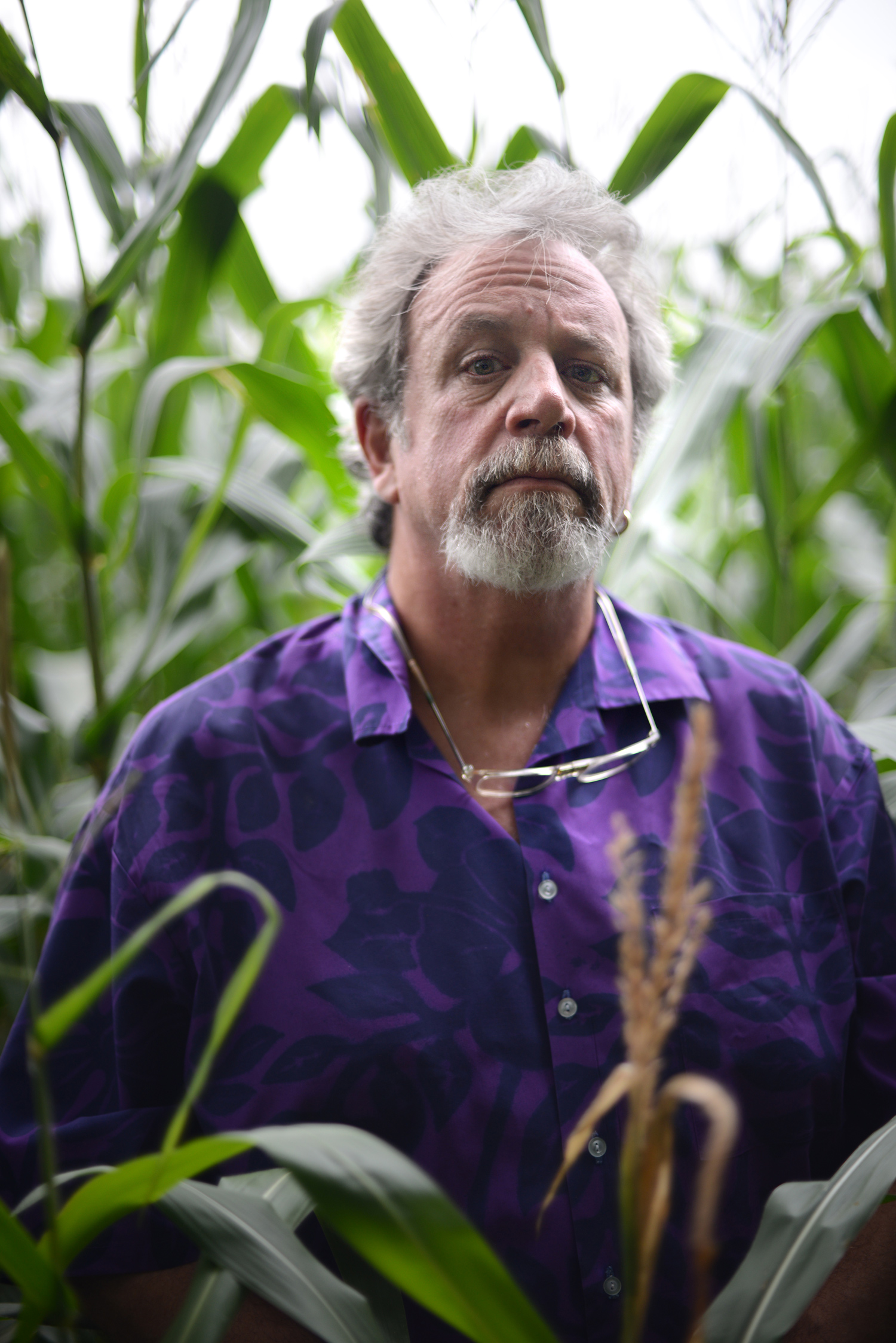
Kevin Murphy, pictured in 2012, who operated and voiced Servo after Josh Weinstein

Servo's voice and personality also changed during the show's early years. While Josh Weinstein operated Servo during the KTMA season, Servo originally spoke with a sleazy, Bullwinkle-type voice in episode K02 (the earliest seen of the regular Servo puppet), then a rather slow squeaky voice from K03–K05, and was somewhat immobile during host segments but oddly very active in the theater. In episode K06, Weinstein switched to a lower voice that Servo repeatedly proclaimed as his new "MIGHTY VOICE!" When Weinstein left at the end of Season 1, Kevin Murphy took over Servo's operation and tried to match Weinstein's Servo voice and personality, but gradually developed a somewhat new Servo sound and character (though Murphy has a fairly deep voice himself). This was explained as tinkering by Joel. During Murphy's tenure, Servo took many opportunities to showcase his excellent singing. He also has an extensive underwear collection (as seen in Mystery Science Theater 3000: The Movie), as well as a large number of duplicates of himself that he made in episode #420: The Human Duplicators (also seen in episode #612: The Starfighters, episode #910: The Touch of Satan, episode #913: Quest of the Delta Knights, episode #1003: Merlin's Shop of Mystical Wonders, episode #1004: Future War, and episode #1013: Diabolik). Female Servo duplicates were featured in The Touch of Satan and Quest of the Delta Knights.

Whenever a member of the cast is required to dress in drag for a sketch, Servo usually does the honors. This is both because of the dichotomy of women's clothes amusingly contrasted with puppeteer Murphy's strong baritone voice and because, in Murphy's words, "Servo looks better in a dress than Crow." Also, Servo is the only robot (other than Cambot in seasons 5–10) whose entire body can be seen on the show, since Crow's legs are behind the desk and Gypsy's body is several yards long.

Servo normally has a condescending personality and at times can make literary and technical references that are above his companions' heads. He frequently attempts to seem physically imposing to others, once acquiring "lifts" for his hover skirt to increase his size (accused by Mike of suffering "short man's disease") and on another occasion showing off a small arsenal he had acquired while drifting through space. Almost invariably, however, any attempts at confronting danger or displaying his intellectual skill cause him such frustration that he ends up crying, often needing consolation from Joel or Mike. He also has demonstrated a tendency to take jokes and skits way over the top, having to be brought back down to earth by the others.

Furthermore, he's easily rattled by sarcastic remarks made from Crow, such as the time when he made fun of his infatuation with a boy's pet turtle Tibby in the episode 'Gamera'.

He does have a good understanding and intellect in spite of his sensitivity and frustration, and revealed in the episode "The Gunslinger" that he's able to teleport at will, even though he only demonstrates this on rare other occasions.

In Season 11 Tom received many upgrades, including the ability to fly or hover as seen many times. Also he seems to have working hands and arms now as he is shown being able to wield a baseball bat. The original Servo is apparently destroyed in Episode 1101 Reptilicus, but a clone identical to the original Servo in every way remains behind, taking his place. In Season 13, where the Satellite of Love set is green screen, Servo's head is permanently clouded to avoid chroma-key problems.

== Other appearances ==
- Tom Servo also appeared in the Cops-style Star Wars spoof Troops as a droid purloined by Jawas.
- Servo, along with Crow, has a cameo appearance (appropriately in silhouette) in the Futurama episode "Raging Bender". Crow shushes Fry as he begins to riff a newsreel they were watching.
- Servo makes an appearance in silhouette in the Homestar Runner cartoon "A Jorb Well Done", during a short scene in a theater.
- The prototype web browser Servo is named after Tom Servo
- In Gold Digger/Ninja High School Issue #1 "A Science Affair", Tom Servo can be seen in the background, marked as "Servo-tron".
- In the Archie Comics series Sonic the Hedgehog, issue #52, Sonic is sent into a 1920s variation of Mobius. In searching for the handheld computer Nicole, Sonic does battle with a number of robots, three of them resembling Crow T. Robot, Tom Servo and Cambot.
- In the Star Trek DS9 TV show and the Star Trek Online video game, '"Tom Servo's Used Robots"' is an entry on the station's public map display.
