= J. Elvis Weinstein =

American writer-actor (born 1971)

- Born: Joshua Stuart Weinstein; May 21, 1971 (age 55); Hennepin County, Minnesota, U.S.
- Notable work: Mystery Science Theater 3000

Comedy career
- Years active: 1987–present
- Website: http://www.stinkburger.com

Joshua Stuart "Josh" Weinstein (born May 21, 1971), known professionally as J. Elvis Weinstein, is an American writer and performer, best known for his roles as Dr. Laurence Erhardt and the original puppeteer and voice for Tom Servo and Gypsy on Mystery Science Theater 3000.

== Mystery Science Theater 3000 ==
Weinstein was one of the founding writers/performers of the show in 1988 at the age of 17. Weinstein worked on Mystery Science Theater 3000 during its original appearance on Minneapolis UHF station KTMA-TV from 1988 to 1989, and its first season on Comedy Central (then called the Comedy Channel) from 1989 to 1990. However, a significant age gap existed between him and the other cast members; he was only 17 when he joined the show, having been recruited by Joel Hodgson from his "Creative Stand-Up and Smartology" comedy classes. This ultimately led to Weinstein feeling unhappy with the more professional approach to the show the move to the Comedy Channel demanded and caused him to leave the show.

In an April 2019 episode of Bill Corbett's Funhouse podcast, Weinstein elaborated on his experience at Best Brains, claiming that MST3K producer, Jim Mallon, was openly hostile toward him and used the age disparity between him and the rest of the cast as a pretext for paying him significantly less for his work on the show than his cohorts.

In 2018, Weinstein returned to the show, providing guest appearances in two of the twelfth season's episodes. He returned again to reprise his roles as Dr. Erhardt and Tom Servo for season 13 in 2022.

== Work after MST3K ==
After leaving Mystery Science Theater 3000, Weinstein became a writer for The Young Person's Guide to Becoming a Rock Star and Malcolm and Eddie; he also served as writer and producer for the NBC dramedy Freaks and Geeks. He changed his professional name from "Josh" to "J. Elvis" to avoid confusion with former Simpsons writer Josh Weinstein. He was head writer for NBC's late night show Later with Greg Kinnear and America's Funniest Home Videos.

Weinstein has an extensive background in stand-up comedy; he has performed over a thousand shows as a stand-up comedian, and has written material for Garry Shandling, Dennis Miller, Roseanne Barr, Louie Anderson and other comedians. He is currently the president of Stinkburger Inc.

He appeared in the 2010 science fiction computer game DARKSTAR - The Interactive Movie as Captain Cedrick Stone of the Galactic Discovery II.

Weinstein currently cohosts the weekly podcast Thought Spiral with friend and fellow comedian Andy Kindler.

== Cinematic Titanic ==
On October 30, 2007, Joel Hodgson announced he was starting a new show with the same "riffing on bad movies" premise as MST3K called Cinematic Titanic, together with former MST3K cast and crew members Weinstein, Trace Beaulieu, Frank Conniff and Mary Jo Pehl.

Weinstein toured with Cinematic Titanic from November 2012 until the show's indefinite hiatus in December 2013.

== Personal life ==
Weinstein is married to musician Allison MacLeod.

== Awards ==
On July 18, 2015, Weinstein was awarded the Melvyn Douglas "Best in Show" Award at the Macon Film Festival for the film Michael Des Barres: Who Do You Want Me to Be, which he directed.
