= Frank Conniff =

American actor (born 1956)

- Conniff at Dragon*Con 2008
- Born: August 30, 1956; New York City, New York, U.S.
- Occupations: Writer; actor; comedian; producer
- Years active: 1990–present
- Parent: Frank Conniff (father)
- Relatives: Lucy Conniff (grandmother)

Frank Conniff Jr. (/kɒnˈnɪf/ kon-NIF;) (born August 30 1956) is an American writer, actor, comedian and producer, who is best known for his portrayal of TV's Frank on Mystery Science Theater 3000 (MST3K).

== Early work ==
Although a native of New York City, where he had accumulated some experience in stand-up comedy, Conniff found himself in Minneapolis in the mid-1980s undergoing rehabilitation for substance abuse. He stayed in the city following treatment, working simultaneously at a fast-food restaurant and in local comedy clubs. Eventually he won out-of-town engagements across the upper Midwest.

It was during this period that he struck up friendships with future MST3K stalwarts Michael J. Nelson, Trace Beaulieu, Bridget Jones and others, as well as Lizz Winstead, later co-creator of The Daily Show on the Comedy Central network. Conniff was appearing in a North Dakota venue when he was informed by MST3K head writer Nelson that he had been selected to replace one of the show's original cast members, J. Elvis Weinstein.

== Mystery Science Theater 3000 ==
From the second through sixth seasons of MST3K's run on Comedy Central, Conniff played TV's Frank, one of the "mads" (short for "mad scientists") along with Dr. Clayton Forrester (played by Trace Beaulieu). During his years with the program, Conniff was also part of the writing team, and the individual responsible for screening and selecting many of the films shown. Conniff made a special guest appearance as TV’s Frank in season 10 episode 1.

== Work after MST3K ==
After leaving MST3K, Conniff went on to become executive story editor for the ABC series Sabrina, the Teenage Witch. He made a few on-air appearances on the show, most notably as "Rootie Kazootie", a baby-turned-adult due to Sabrina's wishing spell. He later became a writer and later head writer on the Nickelodeon TV series Invader Zim. Invader Zim was cancelled in the middle of its second season, but received positive critical reception during its run. In the summer of 2005 Conniff provided the voice for legendary cowboy Buffalo Bill Cody in two episodes of The Radio Adventures of Dr. Floyd. He has made many appearances on Dr. Floyd.

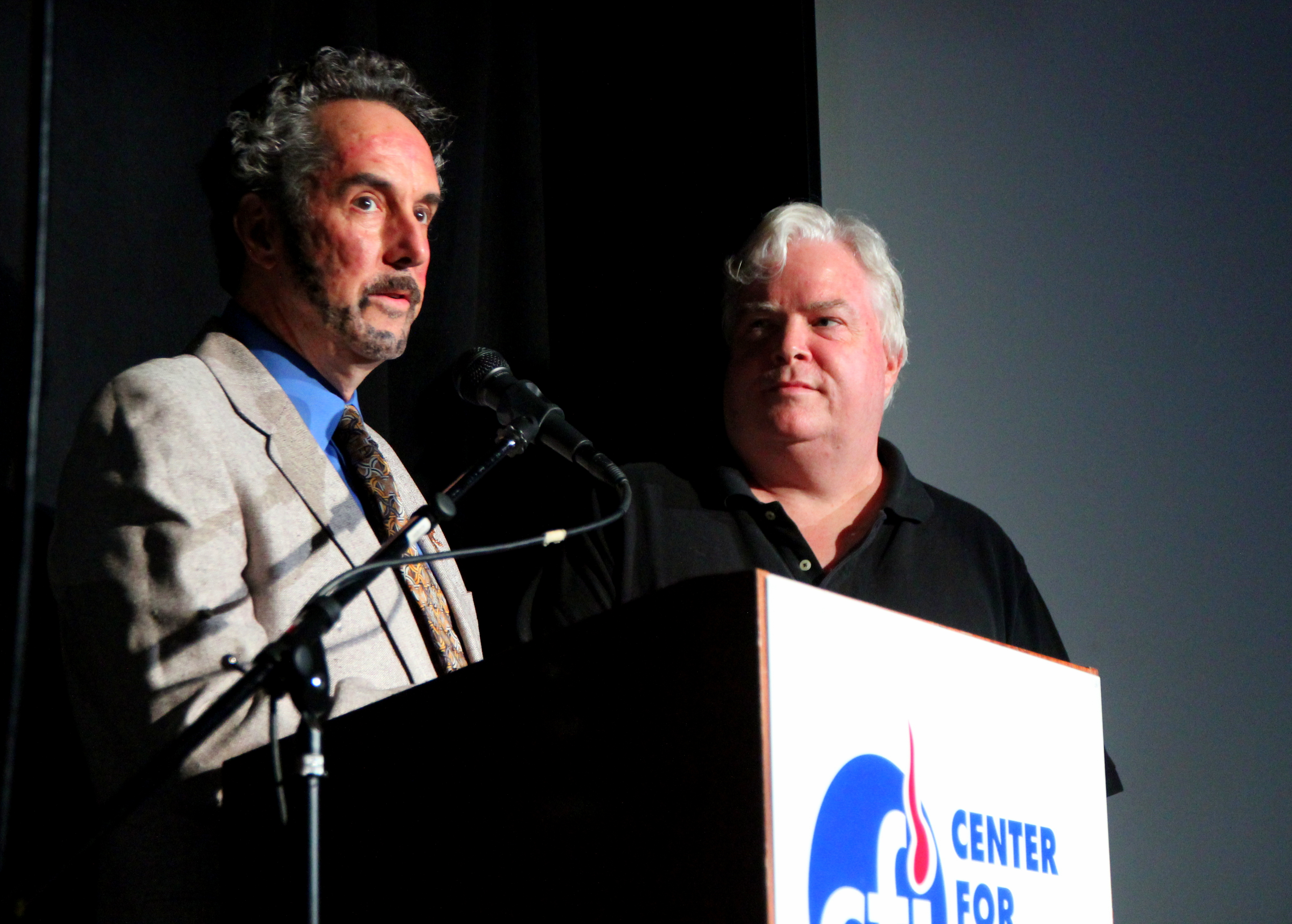
Ron Lynch and Frank Conniff, presenters at the IIG 2012 awards show

From 2007 through 2018, Conniff hosted Cartoon Dump, a monthly comedy/music revue showcasing cartoons of poor quality, at The Steve Allen Theater in Los Angeles. Fellow Mystery Science Theater alum Joel Hodgson later joined the cast, creating his own puppet, "Dumpster Diver Dan".

In March 2008, Conniff starred in the web series The Writers Room on Crackle.

He starred in the 2010 computer game Darkstar: The Interactive Movie as both Navigator Alan Burk and the voice of the robot SIMON (Semi Intelligent Motorized Observation Network).

In 2011, he was one of the contributing writers and performers on the Jimmy Dore show.

In October 2013, he appeared as a contributing performer on Totally Biased with W. Kamau Bell.

From January 2015 through February 2019, Conniff appeared on John Fugelsang's daily talk show Tell Me Everything, on SiriusXM Insight.

Conniff appeared on Ken Reid's TV Guidance Counselor podcast on June 16, 2016.

Frank Conniff and Trace Beaulieu, along with comedian Carolina Hidalgo, host a movie review podcast on the Last Podcast Network, Movie Sign With the Mads, since July 2016.

== Cinematic Titanic ==
On October 30, 2007, original MST3K host Joel Hodgson announced he was starting a new show with the same "riffing on bad movies" premise as MST3K called Cinematic Titanic, together with former MST3K cast and crew members Conniff, Beaulieu, Weinstein, and Mary Jo Pehl. Conniff continued to tour with Cinematic Titanic until they stopped touring in December 2013.

== The Mads Are Back ==
Since 2015, Conniff has joined his former MST3K co-star Trace Beaulieu ("Dr. Clayton Forrester") and gone on tour as "The Mads Are Back", riffing older B-movies in front of live audiences. In the midst of the COVID-19 pandemic, Beaulieu and Conniff moved the show to a ticketed livestream format, offering monthly live-riffs of movies, including some they had previously screened on tour including Glen or Glenda, The Tingler, and Walk The Dark Street.

== Return to MST3K ==
Following series creator Joel Hodgson's sale of his stake in the MST3K brand in early 2026 after an unsuccessful 2023 crowdfunding campaign, new brand owner Radial Entertainment announced that the series would be given another revival in 2026, consisting of four episodes, supported by a Kickstarter campaign. This iteration, dubbed The Rifftrax Experiments, is led creatively by movie-riffing team Rifftrax, itself composed of the primary cast of the final three seasons of the original run of the show, which followed Conniff's departure in the series' sixth season. Subsequently, Rifftrax announced on Kickstarter that Conniff would return to co-write an episode with Beaulieu in which they would also reprise their roles as Dr. Forrester and TV's Frank. Having not participated in the Netflix and Gizmoplex revival seasons of the series, and following a one episode cameo from Conniff alone at the beginning of the original series' final season in 1999, this marks Conniff's and Beaulieu's first time reprising their roles as the "Mads" together since a 2008 DVD sketch, their only previous in-character appearance together in the MST3K franchise since Conniff exited the series in 1995.

== Personal life ==
Conniff is the son of journalist Frank Conniff and the grandson of politician Lucy Conniff.
