= Caloric (brand) =

Caloric is an American brand of kitchen appliances, which dates back to 1903.

== History ==
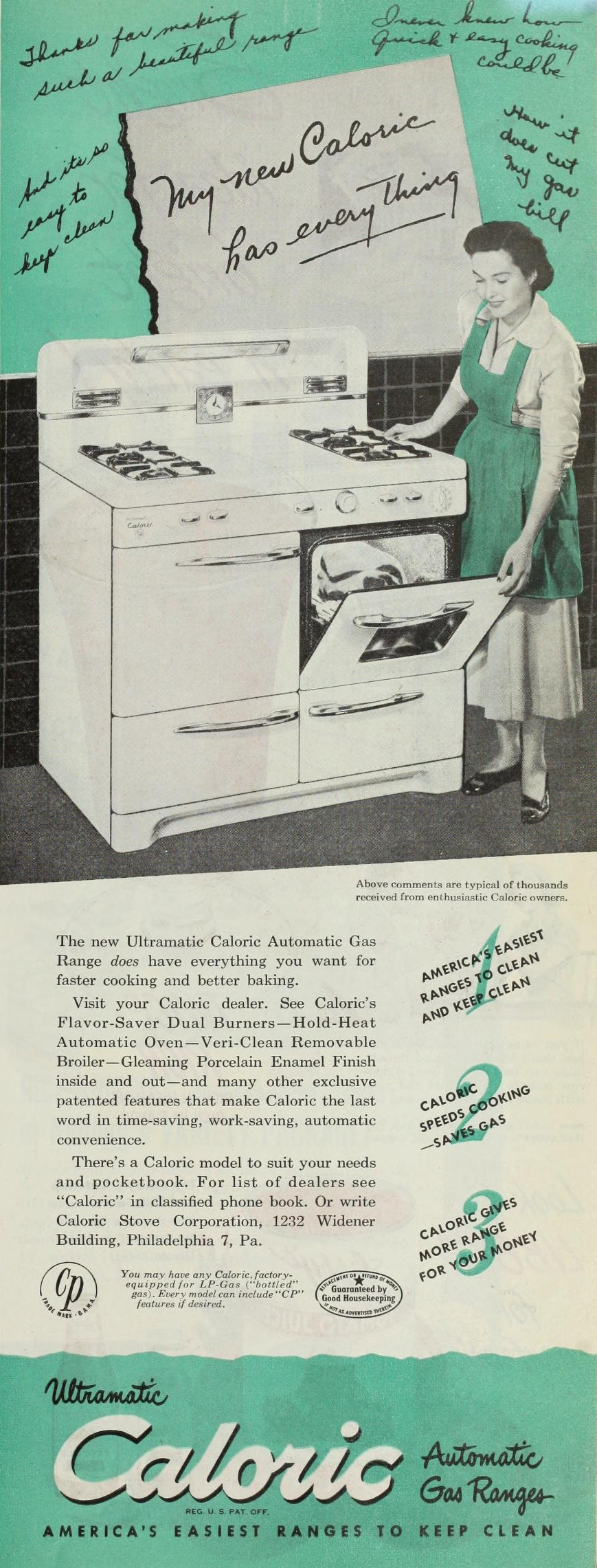
1949 ad for the gas ranges.

Caloric Corporation began as the Klein Stove Company in Philadelphia in 1890. The Caloric brand was introduced in 1903. It was reorganized in 1946 as the Caloric Stove Company in Topton, Pennsylvania. The company was renamed Caloric Appliance Corp. in 1954 and became famous for offering a complete package of kitchen appliances in the 1950s and 1960s. Its most popular product was their built-in wall oven. In 1967, it was acquired by Raytheon Corporation which also owned Amana refrigerators and Speed Queen laundry products. By the early 1990s, Caloric was absorbed into Amana and the Caloric brand was phased out. The Topton plant was shut down in 1991. In 1997 the company was purchased by Goodman Global, a heating-and-cooling manufacturer who sold it to Maytag (now part of Whirlpool) in 2002.

One important feature of the Caloric gas stove in the 1960s was the infrared burner, which cooks through radiant heat. This distinguished Caloric ovens from their competitors, which produced gas ovens comprising two burners: one positioned lower for baking and another positioned on top for broiling.

The Janesville Caloric Company factory existed from 1908 to 1924. It manufactured the Caloric Cooker, a “fireless cook stove” and precursor to modern day slow cookers. The company operated out of an old furniture factory. The Caloric Cooker consisted of an insulated cabinet with one or more deep wells fitted with soapstones on the top and on the bottom. After the stones were heated, the food was put into the wells. The lid could be closed and the meal cooked without danger of its burning. About 150 men were employed by this company when it was in full production. The cookers sold for $8.50 – $15, depending on the number of wells, and came with a 160-page book instruction manual. The company moved operations to Pennsylvania in 1924.

== Revival ==
JMM Lee Properties announced in 2012 the reintroduction of Caloric appliances beginning with a line of stainless steel ovens and ranges in the fall of 2012. They plan on adding more built-in and countertop appliances over the following year.

In Canada, J.A.K. North America Inc. has the rights to market Caloric branded appliances.

== In popular culture ==
In the 1960s CBS television series The Dick Van Dyke Show, the Petrie's New Rochelle kitchen features a Caloric Ultramatic wall oven. Luke Danes has one in his apartment above the diner in Gilmore Girls. The 2010-2016 CBS situation comedy series Mike & Molly featured a Caloric gas range in the home of Molly's mother.
