= Santo en el tesoro de Drácula =

Santo en el tesoro de Drácula (Santo in Dracula's Treasure)
- Directed by: René Cardona
- Written by: Alfredo Salazar
- Story by: Alfredo Salazar
- Based on: Character created by Bram Stoker
- Produced by: Guillermo Calderón
- Starring: El Santo; Aldo Monti; Noelia Noel; Roberto G. Rivera; Carlos Agostí; Alberto Rojas; Pili Gonzalez
- Cinematography: Raúl Martínez Solares
- Edited by: José W. Bustos
- Music by: Sergio Guerrero
- Production company: Cinematográfica Calderón S.A.
- Distributed by: Azteca Films Inc. (US)
- Release date: 24 July 1969
- Running time: 81 minutes
- Country: Mexico
- Language: Spanish

Santo en el tesoro de Drácula (English: Santo in Dracula's Treasure) (aka El vampiro y el sexo, in a separate uncensored version) is a 1968 Mexican film directed by Rene Cardona and starring Santo y Noelia Noel.

Vampire and Sex was shot as a separate adult version for European distribution. A less explicit, kid-friendly version was distributed in 1968. The uncensored version was not shown publicly until 2011 after its discovery.

== Plot ==
El Santo travels to the past with the use of a time machine of his own design in search of the treasure of Count Dracula. In both versions, El Santo and Luisa (Noelia Noel) face Dracula (Aldo Monti) and his entourage of vampires.

== Production ==
At the time of production, it was a common practice to shoot two versions, one family-friendly, the other adult-oriented for primarily European distribution. In fact, it is possible that there are about six such films starring El Santo.

Although then considered an adult film, Vampire and Sex is far from being a pornographic film because it only includes some scenes with integral, partial and transparent nudes of female vampires and Luisa.

In these scenes, naked actresses do not appear near El Santo, and the only "sexual" behaviour is one scene in which Dracula rubs his hand and face against the breasts of the woman he intends turn into a vampire. In spite of this, it is believed that El Santo made a deal with the director René Cardona so that this work would not come to light, and only distributed Santo en el tesoro de Drácula.

== Discovery, controversy and legacy ==
Decades after filming, three original copies of El Vampiro y El Sexo were discovered in a vault in Cinematographic Calderón, the production house of the original film. Using the recovered reels the film was restored by colouring the pictures, which had taken a magenta hue.

The restoration process was funded by the Guadalajara International Film Festival, which planned to show the film to the public for the first time at its 26th annual event, in March 2011, within the vampire cinema showing selected by Guillermo del Toro. However, the premiere was cancelled due to copyright conflicts between the producer's family and El Hijo del Santo, who also wanted to prevent the film from screening and damaging his father's image.

Finally, Cinematographic Calderón resolved that there was no reason to fear a lawsuit against him, and the film was released on July 15, 2011, at the Diana Theater in Guadalajara, and screened again the following month at the Mexico City International Film Festival of Horror.

The family-friendly version of the film is featured in the 13th-season premiere of Mystery Science Theater 3000, which first aired in March 2022.

== See also ==
- Cinema of Mexico
- List of vampire films
- Guadalajara International Film Festival
