= Mary Jo Pehl =

American writer, actress, and comedian

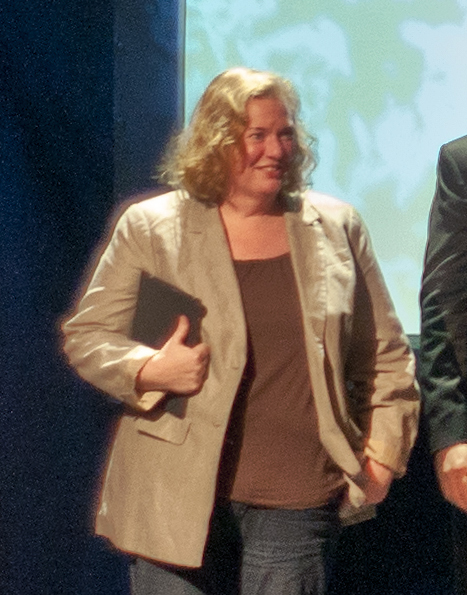
- Pehl in 2011
- Born: February 27, 1960 (age 66); Circle Pines, Minnesota, U.S.
- Occupations: Actress, writer, comedian
- Years active: 1992–present
- Website: mjpehl.com

Mary Jo Pehl (/piːl/; born February 27, 1960) is an American writer, actress, and comedian. She is best known for her various roles on the television series Mystery Science Theater 3000.

== Early life and career ==
A native of Circle Pines, Minnesota, Pehl is one of three children born to Gerald Anthony Pehl, who served as Mayor of Circle Pines shortly after her birth. Although she grew up envisioning a career in nursing, by the late 1980s, her focus had entirely shifted to entertainment.

== Mystery Science Theater 3000 ==
Pehl was one of the writers on MST3K. From 1992 to 1996, Pehl played the role of Magic Voice, a disembodied female voice who would announce incoming commercials at the beginning of the show. In 1996, she began playing the role of Pearl Forrester, the mother of Dr. Clayton Forrester (Trace Beaulieu), initially as a guest character and then as a recurring character on the departure of TV's Frank (played by Frank Conniff). When Beaulieu left at the end of the seventh season, she took over as the head "mad" on the series. She would retain that role to the show's end in the tenth season. Pehl also played a number of other small roles on the series, such as "Jan in the Pan", a woman's head that had been removed from a body (inspired by the film The Brain That Wouldn't Die), and "White Trash Party Girl" from Beginning of the End. In the Bonus Features of the DVD release of The Leech Woman, as part of the larger, special (tin container) release of the 25th Anniversary Edition, Pehl is featured in an ongoing series, Life After MST3K.

== Work after MST3K ==
Since the ending of the series, Pehl has had comedy segments on National Public Radio.

In 2007, she returned to MST3K-style riffing on bad movies, joining former castmate Mike Nelson's RiffTrax for the film Glitter, and Bill Corbett for The X-Files movie, as well as becoming a cast member on Joel Hodgson's Cinematic Titanic, making her one of a select few MST3K alumni to be involved with both Mike and Joel's successor projects. After an extended stay in New York City, she moved to Austin, Texas, with her husband Ronald DeGroot in 2007, and has performed with the Violet Crown Radio Players and Master Pancake Theater.

She has since starred in the science fiction computer game Darkstar: The Interactive Movie as both Captain Beth Ingram of the Starship Bridgebuilder and the voice of the computer Westwick Main.

Pehl appeared on Ken Reid's TV Guidance Counselor podcast on May 13, 2016.

=== Cinematic Titanic and Rifftrax ===
On October 30, 2007, Joel Hodgson announced he was starting a new show with the same "riffing on bad movies" premise as MST3K called Cinematic Titanic, together with former MST3K cast and crew members Pehl, Trace Beaulieu, J. Elvis Weinstein, and Frank Conniff.

She continued to tour with Cinematic Titanic starting from November 2012 until the show's indefinite hiatus in December 2013.

In June 2015, Pehl teamed up with Bridget Jones Nelson to regularly riff shorts for RiffTrax, and participated in the RiffTrax Live MST3K reunion show that was broadcast live in theaters throughout the United States and Canada on June 28, 2016.

=== The Mary Jo Pehl Show ===
In August 2021, Pehl launched a monthly livestream show, The Mary Jo Pehl Show, on her own Twitch channel. The comedy-variety show has featured guest appearances by numerous MST3K alumni such as Joel Hodgson, Trace Beaulieu, Frank Conniff, Jonah Ray, Bridget Jones Nelson, Rebecca Hanson, and Beez McKeever. Additionally, Pehl regularly hosts Movie Jo Night watch parties on the channel featuring her watching mostly made-for-tv movies such as Where Have All The People Gone? and Satan's Triangle.

=== Literary work ===
Pehl wrote her first book in 2004 I Lived with My Parents and Other Tales of Terror published by Plan 9 Publishing.

Pehl contributed quotes to Girls Against Girls by author Bonnie Burton.

In 2011, Pehl released the book Employee of The Month And Other Big Deals.

In May 2022, Pehl released her memoir Dumb Dumb Dumb: My Mother's Book Reviews, which celebrates the relationship she shared with her mother.
