= Trace Beaulieu =

American comedian, puppeteer, writer, and actor

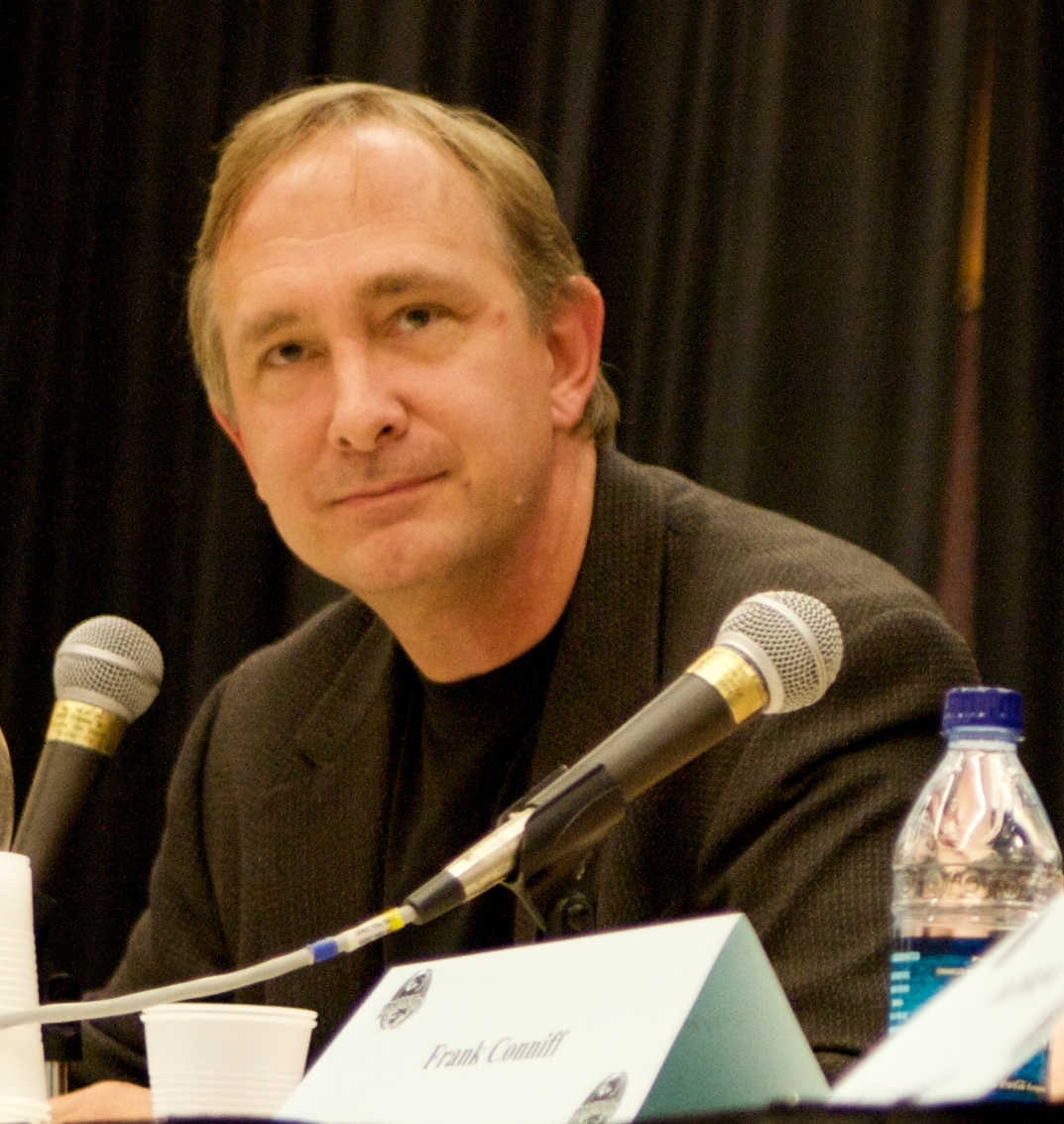
- Beaulieu at the 2008 Dragon Con
- Born: Minneapolis, Minnesota, U.S.
- Occupations: Puppeteer; writer; actor

Trace Beaulieu (/boʊlˈjuː/) is an American comedian, puppeteer, writer, and actor. He is known for his roles on Mystery Science Theater 3000 (MST3K) as well as his work with MST3K's successor Cinematic Titanic with the original creators and cast of MST3K.

Beaulieu briefly attended the University of Minnesota.

== Mystery Science Theater 3000 ==
For the first eight seasons of MST3K (1 at KTMA and 7 on Comedy Channel/Comedy Central), Beaulieu wrote for the show, operated and voiced the Crow T. Robot puppet, and played the role of Dr. Clayton Forrester, the head mad scientist at Gizmonic Institute. After the season five departure of series creator Joel Hodgson, the name of Dr. Forrester's company was changed to Deep 13 because Hodgson held the copyright for the word "Gizmonic" and requested that the show refrain from using the word after his departure. At the end of a truncated seventh season, Beaulieu left the series. Pearl Forrester (Mary Jo Pehl) replaced him as the head mad scientist and Bill Corbett took over the voicing and operation of Crow.

== Work after MST3K ==
Beaulieu appeared as a semi-regular in Freaks and Geeks as the school's biology teacher, Mr. Lacovara. He also appeared in The West Wing episode "Bad Moon Rising". Beaulieu was a writer for America's Funniest Home Videos from 1998 to 2007. In 2002, he was the head writer, producer, and host of the pilot episode of the Animal Planet show People Traps. He has since starred in the 2010 computer game Darkstar: The Interactive Movie as first officer Ross Perryman. In 2013, he reprised his role as Crow for a brief cameo appearance in two episodes of the fourth season of Arrested Development, along with Joel. In 2015, Beaulieu appeared as ART in the Yahoo! original comedy series, Other Space.

Outside of acting, Beaulieu also wrote the script for the one-shot comic book Here Come the Big People, published by Event Comics. In 2010, Beaulieu completed work on a children's poetry book, Silly Rhymes for Belligerent Children, a dark, twisted, humorous collection illustrated by Len Peralta.

In 2014 Beaulieu released a musical short film entitled The Frank with the original MST3K cast, including Bill Corbett, who assumed the role of Crow after Beaulieu left MST3K. (Joel Hodgson appears in The Frank only as a voice-over, while a stand-in wears Joel's trademark red jumpsuit; Michael J. Nelson performs the same voiceover in the color version of "The Frank" available as a DVD extra.)

Beaulieu appeared on Ken Reid's TV Guidance Counselor podcast on June 16, 2016.

Beaulieu was the co-host of Movie Sign with the Mads on the Last Podcast Network with Frank Conniff and Carolina Hidalgo from 2016 until 2020. They discussed current and classic movies.

== Cinematic Titanic ==
On October 30, 2007, Joel Hodgson announced he was starting a new series—distributed on DVD—with the same "riffing on bad movies" premise as MST3K. Called Cinematic Titanic, it featured several former MST3K cast and crew members: Beaulieu, J. Elvis Weinstein, Frank Conniff and Mary Jo Pehl.

Cinematic Titanic completed its final tour on December 30, 2013.

== "The Mads Are Back" tour ==
Since 2015, Beaulieu has joined his former MST3K co-star Frank Conniff ("TV's Frank") and gone on tour as "The Mads Are Back", riffing older B-movies in front of live audiences. In July 2020, in the midst of the COVID-19 pandemic, Beaulieu and Conniff moved the show to a ticketed livestream format via Chris Gersbeck's platform Dumb Industries, offering monthly live-riffs of movies, including some they had previously screened on tour such as Glen or Glenda, The Tingler, and Walk The Dark Street. After four seasons, this monthly series ended in July of 2024, with the duo going on to do intermittent specials in place of monthly livestreams. The most recent of these took place in April of 2025.

== Return to MST3K ==
Following series creator Joel Hodgson's sale of his stake in the MST3K brand in early 2026 after an unsuccessful 2023 crowdfunding campaign, new brand owner Radial Entertainment announced that the series would be given another revival in 2026, consisting of four episodes, supported by a Kickstarter campaign. This iteration, dubbed The RiffTrax Experiments, is led creatively by movie-riffing team RiffTrax, itself composed of the primary cast of the final three seasons of the original run of the show, which followed Beaulieu's departure. Subsequently, RiffTrax announced on Kickstarter that Beaulieu would be returning to the series as art director and that he and Frank Conniff would return to co-write an episode in which they would also reprise their roles as Dr. Forrester and TV's Frank.
