= Bridget Jones Nelson =

American actress

- Born: September 24, 1964 (age 61); Sauk Rapids, Minnesota, U.S.
- Occupation(s): Writer, actor
- Spouse: Michael J. Nelson (m. 1989)
- Children: 2

Bridget Jones Nelson (née Jones; born September 24, 1964), also credited as simply Bridget Jones or Bridget Nelson, is an American screenwriter and actor for Mystery Science Theater 3000. She worked as a contributing writer for the show before becoming a full-time writer in season 4.

== Career ==
On camera, Jones first appeared in episode 316, Gamera vs. Zigra, as Helen, a young Coca-Cola-loving Japanese girl, though she had previously been heard as one of the several personages of Magic Voice. She has played characters as diverse as Mr. B Natural and Lisa Loeb but is probably best known for two roles: Nuveena, Woman of the Future, Mike's singing love interest in episodes 524, 12 to the Moon, and 614, San Francisco International, as Flavia, a Roman matron and Pearl Forrester's nemesis in a multi-episode arc in season eight.

In 2007, Jones joined husband Michael J. Nelson on an audio commentary for Nelson's RiffTrax service. It was the pilot episode for Grey's Anatomy they riffed on and was released June 11, 2007.

In June 2015, Jones teamed up with Mary Jo Pehl to regularly riff shorts for RiffTrax, and was a participant in the RiffTrax Live MST3K reunion show that was broadcast live in theaters throughout the United States and Canada on June 28, 2016.

== Personal life ==
Jones is married to fellow MST3K writer and performer Michael J. Nelson. They have two sons.
