= RiffTrax =

American audio company

- Website type: Film, comedy
- Available in: English
- Revenue: est. $5 million
- Website: rifftrax.com
- Launched: July 20, 2006
- Current status: Active

RiffTrax is an American company that produces scripted humorous commentary tracks which are synced to feature films, education shorts (mostly public domain), and television episodes. With the talents of former Mystery Science Theater 3000 (MST3K) cast members and writers, RiffTrax also produces live shows which are broadcast to movie theaters. The style of commentating originated from MST3K, their earlier television series, in which they would similarly mock (or "riff") films aloud while watching them. As of September 2024, RiffTrax has riffed 554 feature films, 488 short films, and 16 TV episodes.

The first releases originally featured Michael J. Nelson and, later, Kevin Murphy and Bill Corbett, through audio-only tracks intended to be played in unison with unaltered VHS and DVD copies of these programs. After the introduction of already-synced VHS and DVD material, added to the riffers were Mary Jo Pehl and Bridget Jones Nelson, who also wrote and performed for the MST3K series. Guest riffers have also added commentaries, including parodist "Weird Al" Yankovic, comedians Paul F. Tompkins, Cole Stratton and Janet Varney, and actors Joel McHale, Fred Willard, and Neil Patrick Harris, among others.

RiffTrax products are sold in downloadable media online and delivered by app, streaming video, and DRM-free download. It is also featured on Pluto TV, Twitch, Xumo, Tubi and a channel on Samsung TV.

== History ==
Following the cancellation of MST3K, Nelson, Murphy and Corbett attempted to bring the riffing concept to a podcast series known as The Film Crew. During this time, Rhino Entertainment collaborated to produce four riffed films on DVD: Hollywood After Dark, Killers from Space, The Wild Women of Wongo, and The Giant of Marathon.

After the association with Rhino Entertainment and Shout Factory (who distributed The Film Crew DVDs) ended, Nelson and Legend Films started RiffTrax in 2006 based in San Diego. In 2012, RiffTrax was purchased from Legend by Nelson, Murphy, Corbett, and RiffTrax CEO David G. Martin.

The movies chosen for Mystery Science Theater 3000 were predominantly low-budget B-movies because the show itself was low budget and producers could only afford films in the public domain or otherwise cheap licenses. Nelson had researched bringing about directly releasing DVDs of films with the commentaries included, then realized this initial idea was not feasible since he would be "sued out of existence." The best way to distribute the commentaries would be to sell them independently of the films, avoiding rights issues. There would be no legal or monetary restrictions to prevent RiffTrax from producing them, though viewers would have to play their own physical copies of the films at the same time.

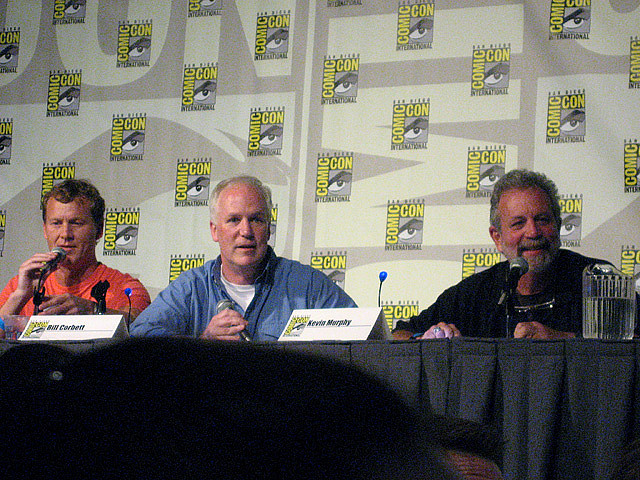
The main crew of RiffTrax in 2009 (from left): Mike Nelson, Bill Corbett, and Kevin Murphy

The company originally produced audio-only tracks which were intended to be played in unison with unaltered VHS and DVD copies of these programs. The early RiffTrax were almost all solo efforts on Nelson's part, but it soon became apparent that there was a strong demand for them. Nelson was quickly able to recruit more riffers for the project. Most official RiffTrax (not counting fan-made iRiffs and the spin-off RiffTrax Presents series) have a stable cast of Nelson, Murphy and Corbett, identical to The Film Crew and the three Sci-Fi Channel seasons of MST3K. Guest riffers vary often; other MST3K alumni have been featured, such as Pehl and Jones Nelson, in addition to Internet personalities Richard Kyanka (of Something Awful fame), Josh Fruhlinger (writer of The Comics Curmudgeon) and Chad Vader, as well as actors Harris, Willard, and McHale, and parodist Yankovic. Nelson has said that he would like to bring in other guests.

The enthusiasm of guest riffers for the project led to the establishment of RiffTrax Presents, a series of tracks exclusively hosted by guest riffers. The success of the guest format is such that "Three Riffer Editions" of some films previously solo riffed by Nelson have been re-produced for VOD services. These feature new riffs by the present lineup, with Nelson having ceased producing solo riffs in 2007.

Most recent works created by RiffTrax are crafted by a small team of writers; longer works are divided into 20- to 30-minute sections for each writer to rewatch and develop riffs for before assembling the entire work.

RiffTrax continues to release audio track riffs that can be used to play over the owner's own copy of a film as well as making versions friendly for films offered on online streaming services like Netflix. They have also since expanded to produce full-length video-on-demand riffs for films that have entered the public domain or otherwise have been licensed cheaply, such as Night of the Living Dead and Santa Claus Conquers the Martians.

Along with the feature-length tracks, Corbett, Murphy and Nelson have created riffs for a number of short films, typically educational and safety films, similar to the shorts presented before features on MST3K. These include films by the Jam Handy Organization, Alfred P. Higgins Productions, Coronet Films and ACI Films, amongst others. Because these shorts are in the public domain, they can be downloaded with the commentary already recorded onto them. Shorts are usually released at least once, and often twice, a week.

In 2008, RiffTrax launched iRiffs, which allows fans to upload commentaries to be sold on the website. iRiffs users are paid 50% of the net revenue generated by their products. iRiffs differentiates from normal RiffTrax in that both serious and humorous commentaries can be uploaded. In February 2009, a contest was held by RiffTrax, in which a winning iRiffs user would be given $1,000 and a chance to develop a RiffTrax Presents title, receiving instruction and critique from Nelson, Murphy and Corbett. The winners of the contest were Doug Walker, Rob Walker and Brian Heinz of That Guy with the Glasses, who contributed an iRiff of The Lion King. The RiffTrax commentary they produced was for Batman Forever.

In October 2015, RiffTrax negotiated the rights to release available MST3K episodes through Vimeo via an all-access subscription plan, with a new re-release uploaded each Monday; individual episodes could also be rented through the site, and in November 2015, RiffTrax also started to sell MST3K episodes on their website. The RiffTrax.com releases contain a newly recorded introduction on each episode by Nelson, Corbett, Murphy, or Jones Nelson and Pehl. A substantial percentage from the episode sales on the RiffTrax website goes to the cast members of MST3K.

On July 20, 2021, RiffTrax celebrated its fifteenth anniversary.

In October 2024, RiffTrax signed a distribution agreement with streaming service Nebula.

Following Joel Hodgson's sale of his stake in MST3K to Shout! Studios, RiffTrax announced a partnership with Shout! entitled Mystery Science Theater 3000: The Rifftrax Experiments, with Nelson, Murphy, and Corbett reprising their MST3K roles alongside Mary Jo Pehl. Due to this, there would be no Rifftrax Live show in 2026. Instead, they premiered the first episode in theaters via Fathom Entertainment.

=== Live shows ===
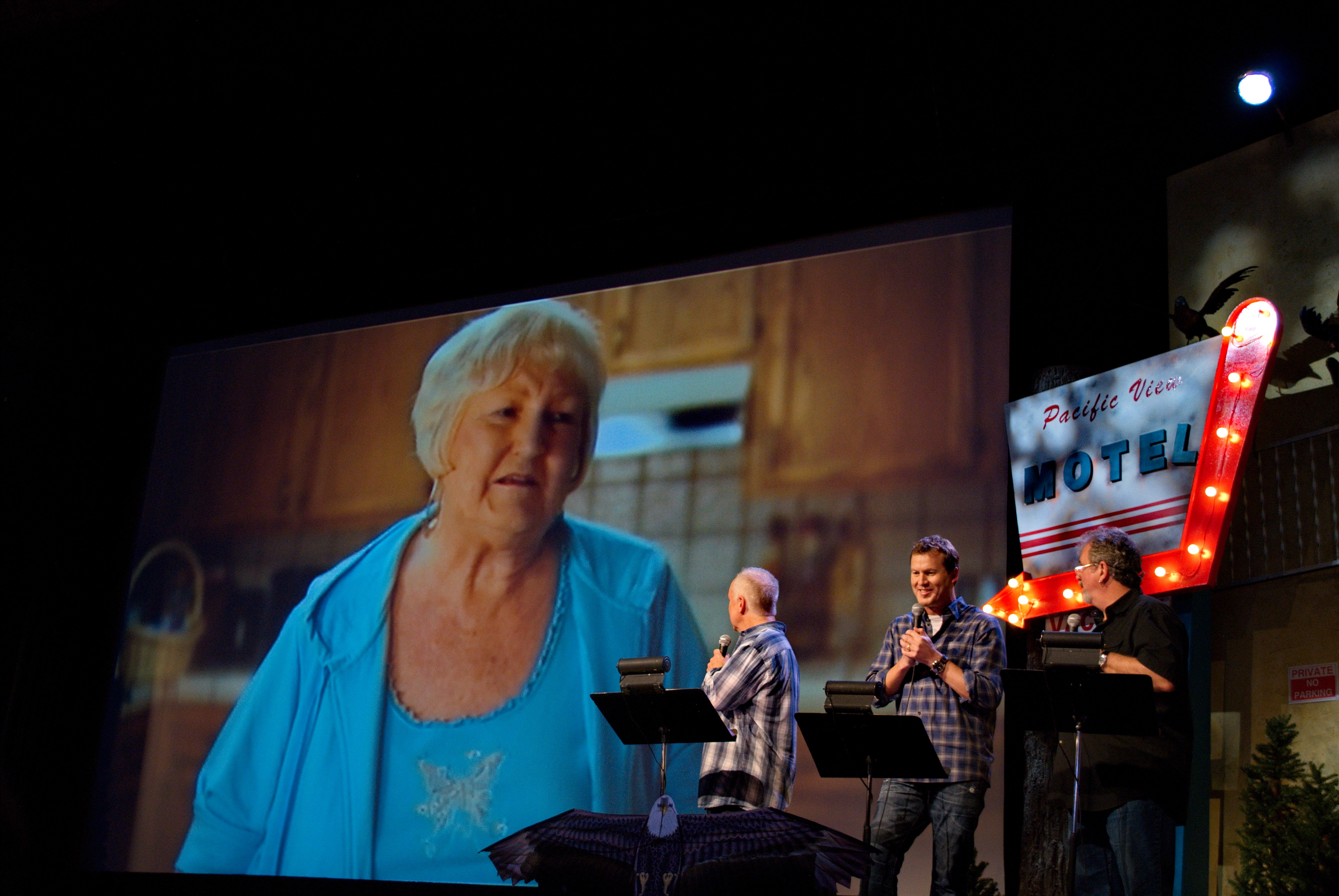
Corbett, Nelson, and Murphy during the live Rifftrax of Birdemic

As part of SF Sketchfest in San Francisco, California, Nelson, Murphy, and Corbett have appeared several times performing live riffs alongside a screening of a film. Early on the team riffed Daredevil and Over the Top (1987) in 2007 and Plan 9 from Outer Space. "Plan 9" was shown in the historic Castro Theater. The RiffTrax crew have done live internet broadcasts on Ustream.tv, riffing public domain films and taking viewer questions.

RiffTrax has teamed with NCM Fathom Events to host special one-night live RiffTrax events. Nelson, Corbett, and Murphy, along with special guests, perform their riffing to a live audience in one theater, which is simultaneously broadcast live to select theaters around the country, except in the Pacific Time zone, where a replay of the broadcast is shown. The first show was performed live at the Belcourt Theatre in Nashville, Tennessee on August 20, 2009, where Mike, Kevin, and Bill riffed Plan 9 from Outer Space, along with the short film Flying Stewardess and guest appearances by Veronica Belmont, Jonathan Coulton, and Rich Kyanka of Something Awful. An encore showing was shown on October 8 of that year. The second RiffTrax Live! show in theaters took place on December 16, 2009, where they riffed several Christmas short films, one featuring special guest "Weird Al" Yankovic. An encore showing was shown in theaters the next day. The third RiffTrax Live! show took place on August 19, 2010, with the trio riffing the cult classic Reefer Madness (its encore showing took place on August 24). A fourth live show riffing House on Haunted Hill, also filmed at the Belcourt, occurred on October 28, 2010, with special guest Paul F. Tompkins. A fifth took place on August 17, 2011, featuring the film Jack the Giant Killer. A sixth took place on August 16, 2012, featuring the film, Manos, The Hands of Fate. A seventh live event took place on October 25, 2012, featuring Birdemic: Shock and Terror. The live event featuring Starship Troopers took place on August 15, 2013. The ninth live event featuring Night of the Living Dead was performed on October 24, 2013.

On February 25, 2013, RiffTrax announced a Kickstarter campaign to raise money to secure the rights to riff Twilight, the first film of The Twilight Saga, for their live show in August 2013. Although the Kickstarter was successful, RiffTrax could not work a deal to secure the rights to Twilight and they, instead, used the funding to secure Starship Troopers.

On May 12, 2014, RiffTrax announced another Kickstarter campaign to raise money to secure the rights to the 1998 version of Godzilla. The Kickstarter raised the goal of $100,000 within a day. On May 29, they announced a stretch goal of $250,000 to secure the rights to Anaconda for their Halloween show. The goal was reached on June 10, the day before the Kickstarter's end.

For 2015, RiffTrax repeated the Kickstarter approach, successfully funding its four-movie event for the year, dubbed "The Crappening". The successful Kickstarter allowed them to riff on The Room, Sharknado 2: The Second One, Miami Connection, and Santa and the Ice Cream Bunny at different live events throughout the year. The Rifftrax riff of The Room was performed live during the 2015 Tribeca Film Festival's series of midnight special events.

For 2016, RiffTrax used a Kickstarter campaign to successfully fund their events for the year, meeting their initial goal of $225,000 within four days after the start of the campaign, with $620,999 as the total amount raised. The first event was a riffing of the film Time Chasers on May 5, 2016, and used a high definition remaster of the film provided by its director, David Giancola.

The second event was a Mystery Science Theater 3000 cast member reunion on June 28, 2016, and took place in Minneapolis. The format of the reunion was similar to RiffTrax's SF Sketchfest "Night of the Shorts" shows, using various educational shorts as riffing material. Alongside Nelson, Corbett, and Murphy, the guests were fellow MST3K cast members Joel Hodgson, Bridget Jones Nelson, Mary Jo Pehl, Trace Beaulieu, Frank Conniff, and Jonah Ray.

The third event for 2016 was Toho's 1961 Kaiju classic Mothra on August 18, 2016, and featured a brand-new widescreen print.

The fourth RiffTrax event was the horror classic Carnival of Souls and took place on October 27, 2016. The print used was the 78-minute colorized version of the film previously released on DVD by Legend Films.

For 2017, RiffTrax again used a Kickstarter campaign to successfully fund their events for the year, meeting their initial goal of $250,000 on March 8, 2017, sixteen days into the Kickstarter campaign. The first event was a new riff of Samurai Cop, on April 13, 2017. The second event was the "Summer Shorts Beach Party" on June 15, 2017. The format of the show was similar to the shorts shows from the SF Sketchfest "Night of the Shorts" and the MST3K Reunion Show. Alongside Nelson, Corbett, and Murphy, the guest riffers were Bridget Jones Nelson, Mary Jo Pehl, Trace Beaulieu, Frank Conniff, and Paul F. Tompkins. The third event was the Doctor Who special "The Five Doctors", held on August 17, 2017; which, for legal reasons, RiffTrax could not reveal this until the RiffTrax Kickstarter campaign had officially ended.

RiffTrax had been wanting to do a Doctor Who episode for some time as a way to bridge into its fandom but had to get permission from the BBC. The BBC had been hesitant, fearing that the nature of RiffTrax may have been mean-spirited, but after seeing some of RiffTrax's work, agreed to the use, feeling it would help promote Doctor Who in America.

Due to the COVID-19 pandemic in 2020, the year's live shows were postponed to 2021, and therefore no new campaign was held in the latter year, but RiffTrax experimented with live virtual shows, using films available on Netflix and the Scener app was used by viewers to pay to watch the event. These shows included riffs on the first episode of Stranger Things in July 2020, and the film Starship Troopers in September 2020.

The list of live Rifftrax shows is:

Date	Main Feature	Short subject(s)	Guest stars
August 20, 2009	Plan 9 from Outer Space	Flying Stewardess	Veronica Belmont, Jonathan Coulton, and Rich Kyanka
December 16, 2009	RiffTrax Live: Christmas Shorts-Stravaganza	Christmas Toyshop, A Visit to Santa, Christmas Rhapsody, Three Magic Words, The Night Before Christmas, A Christmas Dream, Parade of Aquatic Champions, and Rudolph the Red-Nosed Reindeer	"Weird Al" Yankovic
August 19, 2010	Reefer Madness	More Dangerous Than Dynamite, Frozen Frolics, and At Your Fingertips: Grasses	
October 28, 2010	House on Haunted Hill	Paper and I and Magical Disappearing Money	Paul F. Tompkins
August 17, 2011	Jack the Giant Killer (1962)	What Is Nothing?	
August 16, 2012	Manos: The Hands of Fate	At Your Fingertips: Cylinders and Welcome Back, Norman	
October 25, 2012	Birdemic: Shock and Terror	Norman Checks In	
August 15, 2013	Starship Troopers		
October 24, 2013	Night of the Living Dead	Norman Gives a Speech	
December 5, 2013	Santa Claus Conquers the Martians	Santa and the Fairy Snow Queen	
July 10, 2014	Sharknado	A Case of Spring Fever	
August 14, 2014	Godzilla (1998)		
October 30, 2014	Anaconda	Halloween Party	
December 4, 2014	Santa Claus (1959)	At Your Fingertips: Sugar and Spice	
May 6, 2015	The Room	At Your Fingertips: Floats	
July 9, 2015	Sharknado 2: The Second One	Why Do I Need Parents?	
October 1, 2015	Miami Connection	Measuring Man!	
December 3, 2015	Santa and the Ice Cream Bunny	Santa Claus' Story, The Tale of Custard the Dragon, and Santa's Enchanted Village	
May 5, 2016	Time Chasers	Chimp The Fireman	
June 28, 2016	RiffTrax Live: The MST3K Reunion Show	The Talking Car, A Word to the Wives..., More Dates for Kay, Shake Hands with Danger, Americans at Work: Barbers and Beauticians, Stamp Day for Superman, At Your Fingertips: Grasses	Bridget Nelson, Mary Jo Pehl, Trace Beaulieu, Frank Conniff, Jonah Ray, and Joel Hodgson
August 18, 2016	Mothra	Soapy the Germ Fighter	
October 27, 2016	Carnival of Souls	The Dirt-Witch Cleans Up and Masks of Grass	
April 13, 2017	Samurai Cop	Manners in School	
June 15, 2017	RiffTrax Live: Summer Shorts Beach Party	Ricky Raccoon Shows the Way, Office Etiquette, Rhythmic Ball Skills, The Griper, Sentinels of Safety, A Touch of Magic, The Baggs	Bridget Nelson, Mary Jo Pehl, Trace Beaulieu, Frank Conniff, and Paul F. Tompkins
August 17, 2017	Doctor Who: The Five Doctors	Play Safe	
June 14, 2018	Space Mutiny	H. G. Wells' The Magic Shop	
August 23, 2018	Krull		
April 18, 2019	Octaman	McGruff's Drug Alert	
June 6, 2019	Star Raiders: The Adventures of Saber Raine	Values: Telling the Truth	
August 15, 2019	The Giant Spider Invasion	Adventure In Telezonia	
August 17, 2021	Hobgoblins	Life in a Medieval Town	
October 26, 2021	Amityville 4: The Evil Escapes	It's Your Accident	
August 18, 2022	The Return of Swamp Thing	Danny's Dental Date	
August 17, 2023	Rad	The Witty Witch and Hidden Valley	
August 8, 2024	Point Break		
June 26, 2025	Timecop	Our Friend the Policeman	

=== Total Riff Off ===
In conjunction with the National Geographic Channel, Nelson, Corbett, and Murphy created a 3-part television series, "Total Riff Off" that aired on the channel on April 1, 2014, and became available to buy as video-on-demand later on the RiffTrax site. Each episode is one hour long featuring the three riffing on older National Geographic footage. According to Nelson, the idea for the series came from a National Geographic producer who was also a fan of RiffTrax. RiffTrax and National Geographic worked together to find the best footage to use. In 2015, three additional episodes of "Total Riff Off" were created (two as 2015 RiffTrax Live Kickstarter rewards), which were also later available for purchase as video-on-demand on the RiffTrax website.

== The Rifftones ==
In August 2008, Nelson, Corbett and Murphy formed a musical trio named The Rifftones, initially to compete in Quick Stop Entertainment's second Masters of Song Fu competition. They won the competition, beating fellow musicians Jonathan Coulton, Paul and Storm and, in the final round, Jason Morris. After the competition, they decided to continue creating songs as The Rifftones, making songs based on the movies they've riffed and releasing two albums of music, which are available on the RiffTrax site.

== Use ==
RiffTrax commentaries are synchronized at the start of the movie using a cue. To reassure consumers that the MP3 file is synchronized with the film, fictional character and riffer "DisembAudio" (voiced by writer Conor Lastowka) speaks occasional lines in exact synchronization with the movie. "RiffTrax Presents" commentaries feature a female synchronization voice, Debbie. Though RiffTrax are suggested to be played on an MP3 player or with computer software, they are sold as unrestricted MP3s, allowing users to choose the viewing method that suits them the best. A RiffTrax Player is also offered as a free download for Windows computers.

The movies chosen for RiffTrax are based on two criteria: whether the movie lends itself towards a funny riffing, and whether the film is widely available on DVD. These criteria have resulted in a wide variety of genre and era of movies chosen to be riffed. The first audio commentary made available through the web site in July 2006 was for the 1989 film Road House, long cited by Nelson as the cheesiest movie ever made.

=== RiffTrax Player ===
The RiffTrax Player (RiffPlayer) is a program which automatically synchronizes the commentary playback to the DVD playback. The RiffTrax Player makes use of a commentary MP3 as well as a text file (.sync) containing the synchronization information of the DVD and the commentary. As of February 2015, the RiffTrax Player currently supports Microsoft Windows and Mac OS X Snow Leopard and up.

=== RiffTrax On Demand ===
RiffTrax On Demand features downloadable DRM-free video files of films with RiffTrax commentaries embedded. RiffTrax On Demand has released many short, public domain, and educational films similar to the ones that MST3K would sometimes mock before a full-length movie began.

== Video game ==
In March 2022, Rifftrax: The Game was announced. Developed with Wide Right Interactive, and was released on May 5, 2022 on Nintendo Switch, PlayStation 4 and 5, Xbox One and Xbox Series X and Series S, as well as Steam.
