= Joel Hodgson =

American writer, comedian and television actor

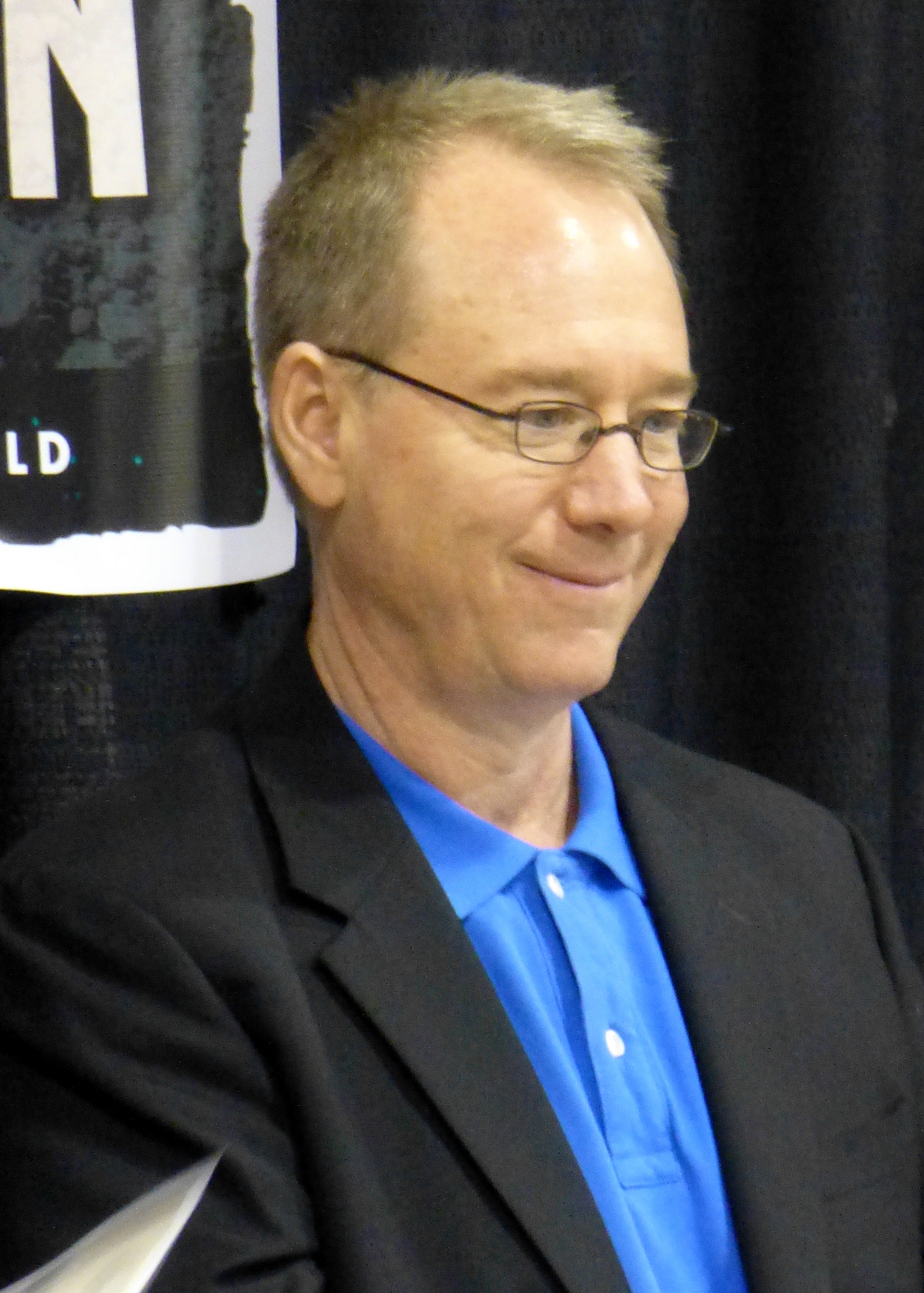
- Hodgson at Wizard World Chicago in 2014
- Born: Joel Gordon Hodgson; February 20, 1960 (age 66); Stevens Point, Wisconsin, U.S.
- Education: Bethel University
- Occupations: Writer; comedian; actor
- Years active: 1982–present
- Website: joelhodgson.com

Joel Gordon Hodgson (born February 20, 1960) is an American writer, comedian, and television actor. He is the creator and star of the television series Mystery Science Theater 3000 (MST3K). In 2007, MST3K was listed as "one of the top 100 television shows of all time" by Time.

From 2007 to 2013, Hodgson was part of the "movie riffing" project Cinematic Titanic with several of his fellow MST3K alumni, performing live and producing content for DVDs and direct download. He has been the creative lead for media at Cannae, a technology firm in Doylestown, Pennsylvania north of Philadelphia.

== Early life and career ==
Hodgson was born on February 20, 1960, in Stevens Point, Wisconsin and lived with his family in Green Bay and Fort Atkinson, Wisconsin west of Milwaukee. He grew up with an evangelical Christian upbringing and later claimed that the various shows his church would put on had a profound influence on his desire to become an entertainer. He began performing as a magician and ventriloquist in seventh grade. He performed for local events in Green Bay, and attended Ashwaubenon High School in Ashwaubenon, Wisconsin, a village next to Green Bay. After graduating, Hodgson went to Bethel University in Arden Hills, Minnesota north of Saint Paul to study theater and mass media. While there, Hodgson further developed his magic act by adding comedy and he opened for musical acts at the university as well as performing in coffee houses and comedy clubs.

Hodgson cites a Theatre of the Absurd class at Bethel taught by David Horn for helping him crystallize the meaning of his comedy. He won the Campus Comedy Contest in 1981 and the first annual Twin Cities Comedy Invitational in 1982. In November 1982 Hodgson moved to Los Angeles where he became a regular performer at The Comedy Store in West Hollywood and the Magic Castle in Hollywood, as well as The Comedy & Magic Club in Hermosa Beach, California southwest of Inglewood. At The Comedy & Magic Club, Hodgson was spotted by Late Night with David Letterman producer Barry Sand and three months later, at age 22, had his network television debut. He made four other appearances on the show and four on Saturday Night Live as a guest act. Hodgson also was a featured performer on HBO's "Eighth Annual Young Comedians Special", hosted by John Candy. Bill Maher, Paula Poundstone, and the Amazing Johnathan were also on the program.

He worked at the Comedy Store while also traveling for stand-up performances in San Jose, California, San Francisco, Detroit, Kansas City, and Minneapolis. Hodgson left stand-up in 1985, citing the need for a creative sabbatical, and moved back to Minneapolis.

Between 1984 and 1988–Hodgson's "official" return to comedy–he built and sold sculptures, worked at a T-shirt factory, designed toys, and began designing and building props (including robots) for other comedians. In 1986 he co-wrote an HBO special with Jerry Seinfeld. He was also considered for the role of Woody Boyd in Cheers. He met Jim Mallon in 1987, and Mallon became production manager at the St. Paul UHF station KTMA Channel 23 in 1988. Hodgson was the first choice to portray "Philo" in the "Weird Al" Yankovic film UHF, but at the time of the filming in 1988, he had begun the production of a new form of television program for KTMA.

== Mystery Science Theater 3000 ==
Building on his gift for designing toys and other gizmos, Hodgson built three robot puppets and created MST3K in 1988. He starred as the show's long-suffering but inventive protagonist, Joel Robinson, who in the backstory is responsible for creating his own robot companions. Hodgson cites the 1972 film Silent Running as an influence for the premise of the show.

MST3K originally aired on KTMA-TV, before becoming one of the first two shows to be picked up by the Comedy Channel, the forerunner of Comedy Central upon starting operations in 1989. The other show, also created and written by Hodgson, was the short-lived Higgins Boys and Gruber, a sketch comedy program that starred Steve Higgins, David Anthony Higgins and Dave Allen.

Hodgson surprised many fans when he left MST3K after its 107th episode, Mitchell, in 1993. Hodgson's departure was scripted into the episode, with a robot, Gypsy, ejecting Joel from the Satellite of Love in an escape pod after incorrectly believing Joel's captors were plotting to kill him. Michael J. Nelson replaced Hodgson as host for the remainder of the series' run. In contemporary interviews, Hodgson stated he was uncomfortable with acting and being in front of the camera. In 1999, he added that he and producer Jim Mallon had been fighting over creative control of MST3K. His departure allowed the show to continue and gave him the opportunity to focus on his preferred creation and production work rather than on performing, which he did only reluctantly.

Hodgson later made a surprise guest appearance in the season premiere for the final season of MST3K ("Soultaker", episode 1001). The original MST3K ended its run in 1999. Hodgson said in 2008 that he felt leaving MST3K "was a bit of a personal tragedy" and that he had "...created the appearance to the press that I had other plans, but I didn't. It was all to keep [MST3K] alive." He also stated that he felt his run on MST3K "...was the perfect job". In a separate interview that year, Hodgson said of his departure from MST3K, "I was, like, totally happy at Mystery Science Theater. I loved it. I wanted to stay, but I was basically having a fight with my partner, Jim Mallon. So we weren't getting along and so I just felt like — I thought it really could possibly jeopardize the show. It would have been easy to create factions out of the group. And by that time it would not have been a fun show to work on. And so, I felt like I saw it coming and I just thought [leaving] was the best thing at the time."

== Work after MST3K ==
After MST3K, Hodgson formed Visual Story Tools (VST) with his brother Jim Hodgson. They created a special for an interactive sketch comedy program called The TV Wheel for HBO, which Joel produced and hosted. It aired only once, on Comedy Central, after the last new Comedy Central episode of MST3K.

Hodgson's other post-MST3K projects and contributions include work as a writer on Trashed, Honey, We Shrunk Ourselves, You Don't Know Jack, Jimmy Kimmel Live!, and Everything You Need to Know. In 1999, Hodgson played a recurring role as a disco-loving clothing store salesman and DJ on the television show Freaks and Geeks. Hodgson was featured as the cover story in the November 1996 issue of Genii magazine. In 1995, Hodgson wrote a season 2 episode of Space Ghost Coast to Coast titled “Urges”, in which Zorak tries to fight the urge to go back to his home planet for mating season, all the while Space Ghost and Moltar try to convince him to stay before allowing him to leave, only for Zorak to return in the end. The following year, Hodgson himself was interviewed in a Space Ghost episode titled “$20.01”, which parodied MST3K and 2001: A Space Odyssey.

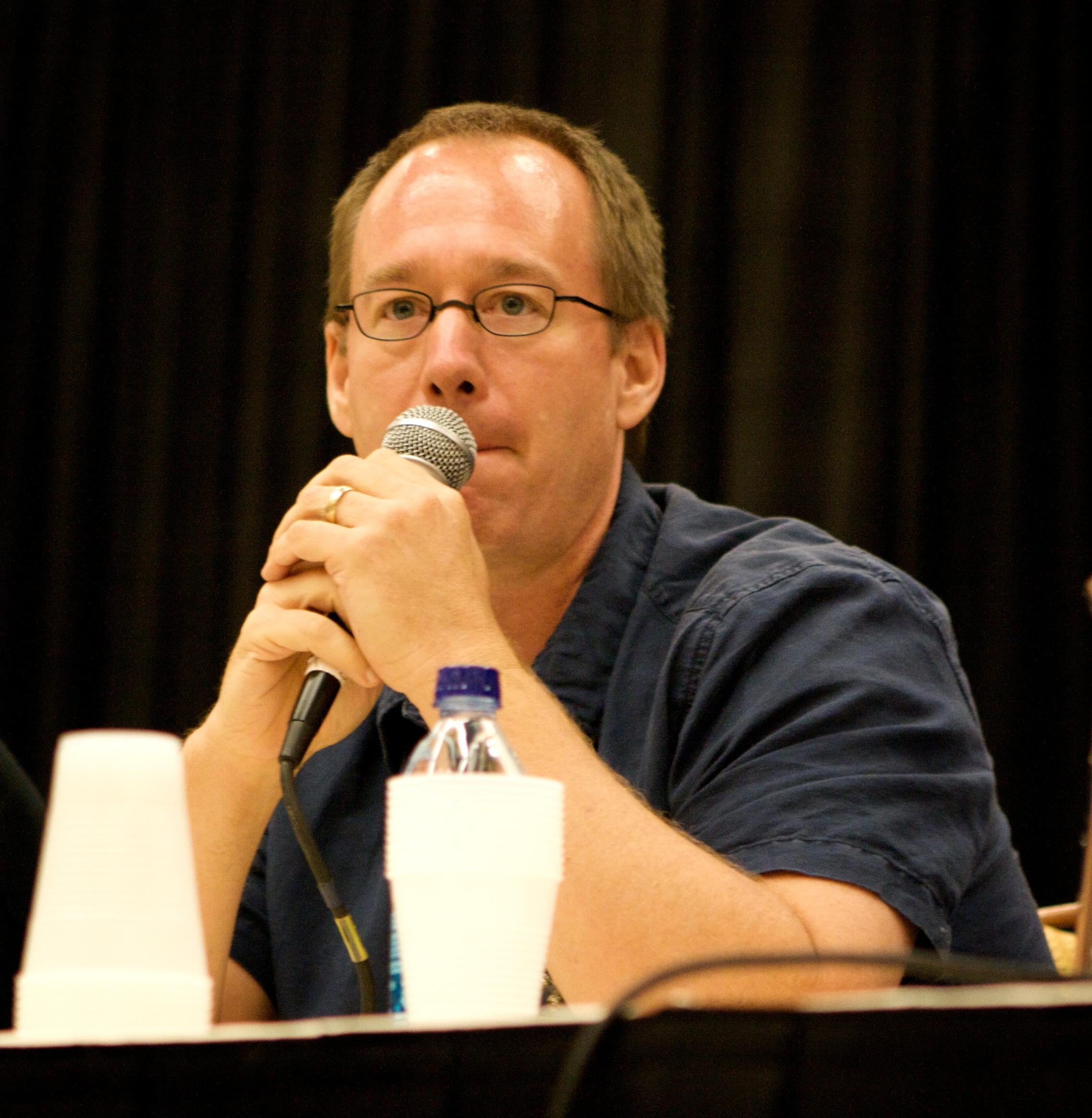
Hodgson at Dragon Con in Atlanta, August 2008

In 2007, he portrayed Blackbeard the pirate in two episodes of The Radio Adventures of Dr. Floyd and recently joined fellow MST3K alum Frank Conniff's monthly comedy revue Cartoon Dump, helming his self-created puppet "Dumpster Diver Dan". He has since starred in the science fiction computer game Darkstar: The Interactive Movie as Scythe Commander Kane Cooper.

He reunited with Jerry Seinfeld as a guest on his web show, Comedians in Cars Getting Coffee. In 2013, he reprised his role as Joel Robinson for a brief cameo appearance in two episodes of the fourth season of Arrested Development, along with Trace Beaulieu as Crow. From 2013 to 2018, he voiced recurring character Mayor Bill Dewey in the Cartoon Network animated series Steven Universe. Creator Rebecca Sugar, a lifelong fan of Mystery Science Theater 3000, personally cast Hodgson.

In 2015, he appeared as Zalien Fletcher, a long-haired, laid-back, dim-witted engineer on the Paul Feig produced space comedy Other Space, which premiered on Yahoo! Screen on April 14, 2015. Fellow Mystery Science Theater 3000 alum Trace Beaulieu also appears as Zalien's robot pal Art, an homage to MST3K.

== Cinematic Titanic ==
On October 30, 2007, Hodgson announced he was starting a new show with the same "riffing on bad movies" premise as MST3K called Cinematic Titanic, together with former MST3K cast and crew members Trace Beaulieu, J. Elvis Weinstein, Frank Conniff and Mary Jo Pehl.

In 2012, he began touring a one-man show detailing his life and career through slides, video, and live interaction titled Riffing Myself. Cinematic Titanic completed the final tour on December 30, 2013.

== Mystery Science Theater 3000 revival ==
On November 10, 2015, Hodgson launched a Kickstarter campaign to bring back MST3K for another season. The Kickstarter closed with over $6.3 million in funding (including "add-on rewards" offered through a separate site), allowing Hodgson to plan to produce fourteen new episodes.

The project was released on Netflix as Mystery Science Theater 3000: The Return in April, 2017, and stars comedian Jonah Ray as Jonah Heston, alongside original co-star robots (puppets voiced by actors) Tom Servo, Crow, and Gypsy, much like when Hodgson hosted the show himself. Hodgson himself makes an appearance on this series as "Ardy," although he is hidden under a HAZMAT suit in this character. The series was met with mainly positive reviews and featured a nationwide live tour titled "MST3K Live! Watch Out for Snakes! Tour". Hodgson was present for each show, marking the first time he has hosted the show in several years, and his first time hosting alongside Jonah Ray. The revived series ran for two seasons on Netflix, ending in November 2018.

On April 7, 2021, Hodgson launched a second Kickstarter campaign to make another revival of the series, intended for a new service called the Gizmoplex, with a possibility that he would host two episodes. The initial $2 million goal was met within the first 25 hours, with a total of $6.5 million at the end, enabling thirteen new episodes, two featuring Hodgson as Joel Robinson, a 3D film, and Halloween and Christmas specials. The season soft-launched to Gizmoplex members on March 4, 2022 with the season's public premiere occurring on May 6, 2022. The first episode of the season in which Hodgson reprises his role as Robinson is the season's sixth, featuring the 2019 film Demon Squad. The episode premiered on June 24, 2022.

Following an unsuccessful crowdfunding campaign for another season of the series in November of 2023, Hodgson's public participation in MST3K over the next two years was limited to two in-person appearances at screenings of past episodes at fan events at the Mahoning Drive-In in Pennsylvania. In January 2026, Hodgson sold his ownership share of the Mystery Science Theater 3000 brand to Radial Entertainment. Following Hodgson's sale of his ownership in the brand and the announcement of his future role as "brand ambassador and consultant," Radial Entertainment announced that the Gizmoplex streaming service would be shut down on dedicated streaming devices on June 30, 2026, and the service's website would go offline on September 30, 2026, while the series would remain available on other streaming platforms. Four future episodes of the series, with no mention of any involvement from Hodgson, were announced by Radial Entertainment in February 2026. This iteration, dubbed The Rifftrax Experiments, is led creatively by movie-riffing spinoff group Rifftrax, itself composed of the cast of the final three seasons of the show's original run which followed Hodgson's initial departure from the series, with contributions from original writers and performers Frank Conniff and Trace Beaulieu.
