= J. Allen Williams =

American animator (born 1960)

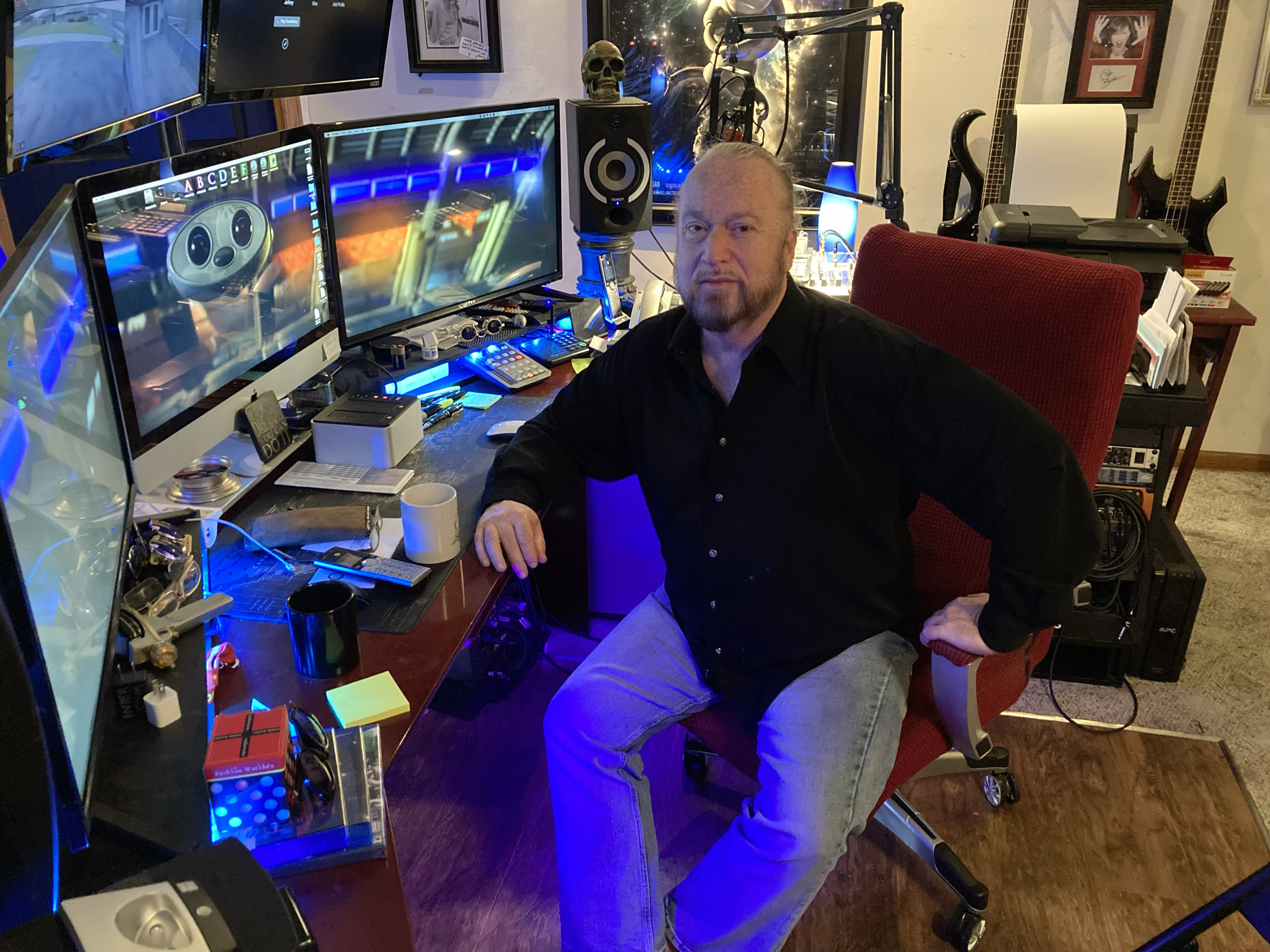
- J. Allen Williams at his studio in 2020.
- Born: Jeffery Allen Williams; September 27, 1960 (age 65); Biloxi, Mississippi, U.S.
- Other names: Jeff Williams; Carmen Wilder
- Occupations: Animator, writer, director
- Years active: 1980–present
- Website: www.parallaxstudio.com

Jeffery Allen Williams (born September 27, 1960) is an American animator, writer, producer, actor, musician, and director. Williams founded Parallax Studio in Nixa, Missouri, and presently continues in the capacity of its CEO. Williams is best known for creating the independent science fiction interactive computer game Darkstar: The Interactive Movie (2010). He has also directed and produced two feature films: the fantasy thriller Everything, completed in 2017, and the science fiction film To Meet the Faces You Meet, currently in pre-production.

== Early life ==
Williams was born in Biloxi, Mississippi, at the military hospital on Keesler Air Force Base. He was raised in the Springfield, Missouri, area, but later moved to Kansas City, Missouri, where he studied illustration, animation, and filmmaking at the Kansas City Art Institute.

He began using the stage name "Carmen Wilder" and formed the progressive rock band Wilder in 1986 with the musicians Bill Bruce, Jimmy Pitts, Brent Frazier, and James Lee Dillard – all of whom would later participate in creating the Darkstar soundtrack.

== Career ==
=== Darkstar: The Interactive Movie ===
Williams is most known for having written, animated, and directed the independent computer game Darkstar: The Interactive Movie. In an interview with Tom Chick at Fidget.com, Williams described his role in the production:

... right at 2000, I decided I was going to do something and I began production. And it just got bigger and bigger and bigger to the point that it kind of did itself. It kind of went out of control. I just wrote the thing and because I'm just one guy doing most of this – I mean, I've probably involved a hundred people to help me, doing sound and camera and all different things, but I bring them in as contract type stuff. But I'm kind of hands-on with every single thing, so that's the bottleneck. One guy being OCD and having to keep control over the whole thing.

Darkstar featured numerous live actors, including Clive Robertson and the original cast of Mystery Science Theater 3000. The project also featured original animations by the artist Richard Corben and was one of the final projects featuring the actor Peter Graves, who narrated the game. Williams also designed various costumes and props for the live action sequences and is one of the three credited composers of the soundtrack, alongside Jimmy Pitts and Bill Bruce.

=== Everything ===
In 2013, Williams and Parallax Studio began production on the independent film Everything, written and directed by Williams. The film was completed in 2022.

=== MEAD ===
In 2020, Williams and Parallax Studio announced production on the independent film MEAD (originally titled To Meet the Faces You Meet), based on the underground comic Fever Dreams written by Jan Strnad and illustrated by Richard Corben, featuring the voice of Patton Oswalt. On July 20, 2020, it was announced that the actors Patrick Warburton and Samuel Hunt had joined the cast. In September 2020, it was announced that Robert Picardo had also joined the cast. Principal photography began in late September and ended in early October 2021. MEAD was premiered at the 2022 Cannes Film Festival on May 22, 2022, and was released for streaming in North America on August 9, 2022.

== Personal life ==
Williams lives in Nixa, Missouri. He has a son, Chance, and a daughter, Maggie. Maggie Williams provided voice talent in Darkstar for the quirky robot MAGS (Motorized Automated Girl for Simon), a character that she also created.

== Filmography ==
Year	Film	Credited Director	Credited Producer	Credited Writer	Credited Actor	Credited Role	Notes
2010	Darkstar: The Interactive Movie	Yes	Yes	Yes	Yes	Dean Wilder	video game
2022	MEAD	Yes	Yes	Yes			
2023	Everything	Yes	Yes	Yes	Yes	Dahl Isaac Everheardt	completed
