= Jan Strnad =

American writer

- Born: Jan Steven Strnad; 1950 (age 75–76) Wichita, Kansas, U.S.
- Area: Writer
- Notable works: The Last Voyage of Sindbad; Mutant World; Stalkers; Star Wars expanded universe Sword of the Atom
- Collaborators: Richard Corben; Dennis Fujitake
- Awards: Goethe Award, 1971
- Spouse: Julie Strnad (m. 1976)

Jan Steven Strnad (sometimes credited as J. Knight; born 1950) is an American writer of comic books, horror, and science fiction. He is known for his many collaborations with artist Richard Corben, as well as his work in the Star Wars expanded universe, the majority of which has been published by Dark Horse Comics. He has also written for DC Comics, Marvel Comics, Eclipse Comics, and Fantagraphics.

== Biography ==
A native of Wichita, Kansas, of Czech descent, Strnad was influenced by such writers as Mark Twain and John Steinbeck, as well as DC and Marvel comic books.

He was active in comics fandom in the 1960s and contributed to fanzines such as Rocket's Blast Comicollector, where he wrote the column "Eyeing the Egos". He also published his own zine, Anomaly, until it was taken over by Bud Plant.

Strnad's first professional comics were collaborations with Richard Corben, published in Rip Off Press's Fantagor. Other collaborations were published by Warren Publishing. In 1978–1979 he and Corben serialized "New Tales of the Arabian Nights" in Heavy Metal, and in 1982 they produced the Jeremy Brood trade paperback. In 1990, Strnad and Corben produced the five-issue limited series Son of Mutant World, published by Corben's Fantagor Press imprint. From 1996–1997, Strnad and Corben produced "Denz" stories for Penthouse Comix #15–20. Strnad and Corben worked together on the Flash animation web series Bludd for PirateNet in 2000. Dark Horse Comics published Strnad and Corben's limited series RageMoor in 2012.

Strnad has also collaborated a number of times with artist Dennis Fujitake, in Dalgoda, published by Fantagraphics from 1984–1986 (Fantagraphics' first direct-market title), followed by Flesh and Bones (also featuring Dalgoda) in 1986; and Keith Laumer's Retief, published by Mad Dog Graphics in 1987–1988. From 1981–1986, Strnad contributed articles to The Comics Journal.

Other notable titles by Strnad include the Sword of the Atom limited series, with artist Gil Kane, published by DC Comics in 1983, followed by three Specials (1984–1988); Stalkers (Epic Comics, 1990–1991) with Val Mayerik; and Starship Troopers: Dominant Species #1-4 (Dark Horse, 1998) with artist Davidé Fabbri.

Strnad's Star Wars work includes story arcs in Star Wars: X-Wing Rogue Squadron (1996–1997), Star Wars: Prelude to Rebellion (1998–1999), and "Vow of Justice" in Star Wars: Republic, all published by Dark Horse Comics.

In the early 1990s, Strnad moved to Los Angeles to join the staff of Disney Television Animation, where he worked on Darkwing Duck (1991-1992) Goof Troop (1992–1993) and Aladdin (1994–1995). He later wrote for Sitting Ducks (Universal, 2001–2003) and Harold and the Purple Crayon (Sony, 2002).

Since 2000, he has concentrated on prose novels, three of which he self-published.

In May 2020, Parallax Studio announced preproduction on the live-action animated film MEAD (originally titled To Meet the Faces You Meet) based on the comic book Fever Dreams written by Strnad and illustrated by Richard Corben. The film features the voices of Patton Oswalt and Patrick Warburton and stars Robert Picardo and Samuel Hunt. MEAD was premiered at the 2022 Cannes Film Festival on May 22, 2022, and was released for streaming in North America on August 9, 2022.

== Personal life ==
Strnad lives in Los Angeles with his wife Julie and his step-son.

== Awards ==
Strnad won the 1970 Goethe Award for "Favorite Fan Writer." He was nominated for the same award in 1972.

== Bibliography ==
=== Comics ===
==== Richard Corben collaborations ====
- "Encounter at War" in Anomaly #3 (Bud Plant Inc., 1971) re-published in Unknown Worlds of Science Fiction #4 (Magazine Management, July 1975) and in color in Den [III] #4 (Fantagor Press, 1988)
- "To Spear a Fair Maiden," in Fantagor #2 (Rip Off Press, 1971)
- "Alice in Wonderlust," in Anomaly #4 (Bud Plant Inc., 1972)
- "Kitten for Christian", in Fantagor #3 (Rip Off Press, 1972)
- "To Meet the Faces You Meet," in Fever Dreams (Kitchen Sink Press, 1972)
- "Bowser," in Creepy #77 (Warren Publishing, 1976); republished in Vampirella #54 (Warren Publishing, 1976), Creepy #132 (Warren Publishing, 1981), Comix International #4 (Warren Publishing, 1976), and The Best of Richard Corben from Creepy and Eerie (Metal Mammoth, Inc., 1998)
- "Ogre," in 1984 #4 (Warren Publishing, 1978)
- "Mutant World," in 1984 #1–8 (Warren Publishing, 1978–1979); collected in Mutant World (Fantagor Press, 1982)
- "New Tales of the Arabian Nights," in Heavy Metal #15–28 (HM Communications, 1978–1979); collected as The Last Voyage of Sindbad (Catalan Communications, 1988)
- Jeremy Brood (Fantagor Press, 1982)
- "Relativity", in Epic Illustrated #15 (Marvel Comics, December 1982)
- "Doomscult," in Heavy Metal #75 (HM Communications, June 1983)
- "Such Pretty Little Toes," in Den [III] #8 (Fantagor Press, 1989)
- "The Wreck of the Katerra-dan," in Den [III], in #9 (Fantagor Press, 1989)
- "Incantation," in Den [III] #10 (Fantagor Press, 1989)
- "Donneman's Bluff," in Den [III] #10 (Fantagor Press, 1989)
- "Turtles Take Time," Teenage Mutant Ninja Turtles #33 (Mirage Studios, 1990)
- Son of Mutant World (Fantagor Press, 1990)
- "Monster Maker," in Batman Black and White #2 (DC Comics, July 1996)
- "Denz" stories for Penthouse Comix #15–20 (Penthouse International/General Media Communications, 1996–1997)
- "Full Moon Killer Strikes Again" in Spirit #7 (DC Comics, December 2010)
- RageMoor limited series (Dark Horse Comics, 2012)

==== Other comics writing ====
- The Amazing Spider-Man #228 (Marvel Comics, May 1982), with artists Rick Leonardi and Dave Simons
- Marvel Two-in-One #90 (Marvel Comics, August 1982), with artists Alan Kupperberg and Jim Mooney
- Sword of the Atom #1–4 limited series (DC Comics, September–December 1983), with artist Gil Kane
- Sword of the Atom Special #1 (DC Comics, 1984) with artist Gil Kane
- Dalgoda #1–8 (Fantagraphics, August 1984–April 1986), with artist Dennis Fujitake
  - "Grimwood's Daughter," in Dalgoda #2–6 (Fantagraphics, December 1984–October 1985), with artist Kevin Nowlan; collected as Grimwood's Daughter (IDW Publishing, 2009)
- "Duet" in Epic Illustrated #27 (Marvel Comics, December 1984) with artist Neal McPheeters
- Sword of the Atom Special #2 (DC Comics, 1985) with artist Gil Kane
- Children of the Night Tide (Fantagraphics, March 1986), with artist Dennis Fujitake
- "¿Who's Stronger?" in Anything Goes! (Fantagraphics, October 1986) with artist Gilbert Hernandez
- Flesh and Bones #1–4 (Dalgoda), (Fantagraphics / Upshot Graphics, 1986), with artist Dennis Fujitake
- Keith Laumer's Retief #1–6 (Mad Dog Graphics, April 1987–March 1988), with artist Dennis Fujitake
- Dinosaur Rex #1–3 (Fantagraphics, 1987), with artist Henry Mayo
- Talos of the Wilderness Sea #1 (DC Comics, 1987) with artist Gil Kane
- Sword of the Atom Special #3 (DC Comics, 1988) with artist Pat Broderick
- "The Secret Origin of Man-Bat" in Secret Origins vol. 2 #39 (DC Comics, April 1989) with artist Kevin Nowlan
- "The Warm Red" in Clive Barker's Hellraiser #1 (Epic Comics, 1989) with artist Bernie Wrightson
- "The Hero of the Tale" in A1 #4 (Atomeka Press, 1990) with artist Kevin Nowlan
- Stalkers #1–12 (Epic Comics, April 1990–March 1991), with artist Val Mayerik
- "The Silent Knight" in Secret Origins vol. 2 #49 (DC Comics, June 1990) with artist John Koch
- "The Crystal Precipice" in Clive Barker's Hellraiser #3 (Epic Comics, 1990) with artist Steve Buccellato
- "To Prepare a Face" in Clive Barker's Hellraiser #4 (Epic Comics, 1990) with artist Mark Chiarello
- Star Wars: Droids #4–8 (Dark Horse Comics, September–December 1995) with artist Bill Hughes
- X-wing Rogue Squadron: Battleground: Tatooine #9–12 (Dark Horse Comics, July–September 1996), with writer Michael A. Stackpole
- "Monsters in the Closet" in Batman Black and White #4 (DC Comics, September 1996) with artist Kevin Nowlan
- X-wing Rogue Squadron: Requiem for a Rogue #17–20 (Dark Horse Comics, March–June 1997), with writer Michael A. Stackpole
- Starship Troopers: Dominant Species #1–4 (Dark Horse Comics, 1998), with artist Davide Fabbri
- Star Wars: Prelude to Rebellion #1–6 (Dark Horse Comics, December 1998–May 1999)
- "Private Parker Sees Thunder Lizards" in Weird War Tales #1 (DC Comics, November 2010) with artist Gabriel Hardman

=== Prose ===
- (written as J. Knight) Risen (Warner Books, 2001) ISBN 978-0759550384
- The Summer We Lost Alice (CreateSpace, 2012) ISBN 978-1479274420
- The Murmuring Field and Other Stories (CreateSpace, 2013) ISBN 978-1489579430
- One Last Time (Jan S. Strnad, 2014) ISBN 978-0989033428

== Television and film credits ==
=== Television ===
- TaleSpin (1990)
- Darkwing Duck (1991)
- Goof Troop (1992)
- Aladdin (1994-1995)
- X-Men: The Animated Series (1994-1995)
- Iron Man (1995)
- Skeleton Warriors (1995)
- Spider-Man: The Animated Series (1995)
- Project G.e.e.K.e.R. (1996)
- 101 Dalmatians: The Series (1997)
- Hercules (1998)
- RoboCop: Alpha Commando (1998-1999)
- Ace Ventura: Pet Detective (1999)
- Sabrina: The Animated Series (1999)
- Young Hercules (1999)
- The Avengers: United They Stand (2000)
- Buzz Lightyear of Star Command (2000)
- Jackie Chan Adventures (2001)
- Harold and the Purple Crayon (2002)
- House of Mouse (2002)
- Lilo & Stitch: The Series (2004)
- Brandy & Mr. Whiskers (2004, 2006)
- Trollz (2005)
- Batman Black and White (2009)
- SpongeBob SquarePants (2022)

=== Film ===
- The Return of Jafar (1994)
- Noah's Ark (1995)
- The Amazing Feats of Young Hercules (1997)
- MEAD (2022)

Preceded by n/a	Goethe Award for "Favorite Fan Writer" recipient 1971	Succeeded by Tony Isabella
Preceded by Michael A. Stackpole and Darko Macan	Star Wars: X-wing Rogue Squadron writer (with Michael A. Stackpole); 1996	Succeeded by Michael Stackpole and Scott Tolson
Preceded by Michael Stackpole and Scott Tolson	Star Wars: X-wing Rogue Squadron writer (with Michael A. Stackpole); 1997	Succeeded by Michael A. Stackpole
