= Bolo (1982 video game) =

- Developer: Synergistic Software
- Publisher: Synergistic Software
- Designer: Jim Lane
- Platform: Apple II
- Release: 1982
- Genre: Multidirectional shooter
- Mode: Single-player

Bolo is a video game written by Jim Lane for the Apple II and published by Synergistic Software in 1982. It was inspired by Keith Laumer's 1976 science fiction novel Bolo: Annals of the Dinochrome Brigade, which featured self-aware tanks.

== Gameplay ==
Gameplay screenshot

Upon startup Bolo requests a level number (1–9) and density (1–5); the game then generates a random rectangular maze containing six enemy bases. The higher the density specified, the more walls appear in the maze. The player controls a tank, and must destroy the six enemy bases to advance to the next level. The player can view 1/132 of the maze at one time; indicators on the right side of the screen show the player's position within the maze, the direction of the enemy bases and the fuel remaining.

Enemy tanks constantly emerge from each of the six enemy bases. Different levels feature different types of enemy tanks; some move randomly while others pursue the player. All enemy tanks fire deadly shells. If the player collides with a bullet, an enemy base or tank, or a wall, a turn is lost. A turn is also lost if the player runs out of fuel; destroying an enemy base will replenish the player's fuel supply. The player is provided with four tanks per game, and no opportunity is provided to earn more.

Once all six enemy bases are destroyed, the player is presented with a congratulatory message from the Dinochrome Brigade, and a new maze (with the same level and density) is generated.

The player can turn the tank's gun turret with 1 and 2 keys, a necessity in more advanced levels as enemies give chase as fast as the player's tank can move.

Bolo uses pixel-perfect collision detection.

== Reception ==
Softline in 1983 said that Bolo "is a hot game. Who ever said that the only good arcade games were in the arcades? ... Animation, graphics, playability—Bolo is in every way a superior 'game' to Tron". Electronic Games called the game's graphics "a bit plain" compared to Sir-Tech's Star Maze, but "Bolo's play-action is, in its way, every bit as entertaining as the earlier game". Bolo tied Choplifter for SoftTalk Magazine's #1 game for the year 1982.

In 2010, Time columnist Lev Grossman ranked Bolo at number three out of "The 10 Greatest Games for the Apple II". Grossman praised the game's fast action, smooth scrolling, elegant graphics and AI enemies.
