= Retief to the Rescue =

1983 shared fantasy anthology

- Cover art by Rowena Morrill
- Author: Keith Laumer
- Illustrator: Rowena Morrill
- Series: Retief
- Genre: Science fiction
- Publisher: Timescape Books
- Publication date: 1983
- ISBN: 0-671-81866-X
- Preceded by: Retief: Diplomat at Arms
- Followed by: The Return of Retief

Retief to the Rescue is a light-hearted space opera novel by Keith Laumer that was published by Simon & Schuster under their Timescape Books imprint in 1983. It was the twelfth of nineteen novels and anthologies based on the fictional space diplomat Jame Retief, but the first Retief novel to be published since Laumer's stroke a decade before.

== Plot ==
Jame Retief is sent to the planet Furtheron to aid the Corps Diplomatique Terrestrienne (CDT), who are trying to negotiate a settlement between two indigenous races, the Hither Furtherons (Crawlies), who live on the planet's surface, and the Nether Furtherons (Creepies), who live underground. While the rest of the Terran delegation hosts dinner parties and conducts staff meetings, Retief discovers that the civil war has been exacerbated by the duplicitous alien Groaci, Retief's opponents throughout his career, who have been supplying both sides with modern weaponry. Retief takes a direct, two-fisted approach to solve the situation and save the lives of the diplomats.

== Publication history ==
Keith Laumer first introduced the character Jame Retief in 1963's Envoy to New Worlds. The character proved popular, and Laumer created a long series of novels and short stories about Retief's adventures. In 1971, Laumer suffered from a stroke, which curtailed his writing. After a slow recover, Laumer began writing again, and the twelfth book in the Retief series, Retief to the Rescue, was published by Simon & Schuster under their Timescape Books imprint in 1983, the first Retief novel to be released since Laumer's stroke.

== Reception ==
In Issue 23 of Abyss, Jon Davies noted "On the whole it is an enjoyable read, with some good laughs, silly characters, and pleasant plot twists. Like all of Laumer's fiction, especially the Retief series, it is good, light SF which demands little from the reader except the ability to laugh freely." However, Davies noted that Laumer had recycled the first few chapters from the story Truth or Consequences that had been published a few months previously in the anthology Retief: Diplomat at Arms. Davies called this "pretty shabby." Davies concluded, "Somehow this doesn't show well for Laumer, and it certainly hurt what seemed to be one of the best Retief pieces as far as I was concerned."

In the May 1983 issue of Amazing Stories, Frank Catalano was not impressed, saying, "this book staggers like a world-class drunk. I kept waiting to learn something about Jame Retief ... And kept waiting. Right through the final page. You learn nothing about the man, his motivations, his background, or even what he looks like." Catalano also found problems with the plot, noting, "Even for light SF/adventure, there are too many implausible situations, unbelievable characters ... and a paper-thin plot." Catalano concluded, "There is some good satire of diplomacy and those who practice it, but Retief to the Rescue, diplomatically speaking, is underwhelming."

In Issue 72 of Dragon, Chris Henderson commented, "It is a typical Laumer tour de force, wildly funny, never stopping for anything as mundane as common sense or honesty." Henderson concluded, "If you can't afford the hardbound volume, be sure to catch the paperback when it comes around."

== Reviews ==
- Review by Thomas A. Easton [as by Tom Easton] (1983) in Analog Science Fiction/Science Fact, July 1983
