= Ultimax =

Ultimax may refer to:

- US sames name for the Commodore MAX Machine
- Ultimax 100, a firearm
- Persona 4 Arena Ultimax, a 2013 video game
- A model of engine used by the Doble steam car
- A brand of sock formerly sold by the Wigwam Mills hosiery company
- The Ultimax Man, a 1978 novel by Keith Laumer
- An alias of the DC Comics supervillain Brain
