= Galactic Odyssey =

1967 novel by Keith Laumer

- First edition
- Author: Keith Laumer
- Cover artist: Richard M. Powers
- Language: English
- Genre: Science fiction
- Publisher: Berkley
- Publication date: 1967
- Publication place: United States
- Media type: Print (paperback)

Galactic Odyssey is a science fiction novel by American writer Keith Laumer. It was originally serialized in If magazine from May to July, 1967, under the title Spaceman. Later the same year it was published as a standalone novel titled Galactic Odyssey.

== Synopsis ==
Down-on-his-luck college dropout Billy Danger shelters from a sleet storm in what he thinks is a corn silo, but which turns out to be a space yacht containing three upper-class hunters from a planet located halfway across the Milky Way. They take him on as a gun-bearer, but after landing on a desert world known as Gar 28, both of the male hunters are killed by their prey. Billy is left alone with the beautiful Lady Raire, the unwilling companion of the dead men. Since neither Billy nor Lady Raire knows the password to re-enter the space yacht, they are effectively marooned. Eventually they find the wreck of an ancient starship and use its components to signal for help. Unfortunately, their signal attracts a ship full of hostile aliens who severely wound Billy. The aliens kidnap Lady Raire, leave Billy for dead, and depart in their ship.

Billy is nursed back to health by a giant tabby cat descended from pets that survived the starship crash. A friendlier bunch of aliens arrive on Gar 28 and give Billy a ride to another planet, where he begins his quest to find and rescue Lady Raire. After mastering the technical skills needed to crew a starship, he works his way across the galaxy, seeking the lady's homeworld. His adventures include being captured on an espionage mission, which forces him to give up his right eye to ransom the lives of his fellow spies. He endures betrayal and slavery before he finally escapes, takes revenge on his enemies, and flies off with Lady Raire.
