= MEAD =

- Directed by: J. Allen Williams
- Screenplay by: Jan Strnad; J. Allen Williams
- Based on: Fever Dreams by: Jan Strnad; Richard Corben
- Produced by: J. Allen Williams; Nathan Shelton
- Starring: Samuel Hunt; Patton Oswalt; Robert Picardo; Patrick Warburton; Kassandra Wright; Lillie Young; Shawn Young
- Cinematography: Roger Jared
- Edited by: J. Allen Williams
- Music by: Bjørn Lynne (music supervisor)
- Production company: Parallax Studio
- Distributed by: Vision Films
- Release dates: May 22, 2022 (Cannes Film Festival); August 9, 2022 (North America)
- Running time: 105 minutes
- Language: English

MEAD is a 2022 science fiction live-action animated film based on the story "To Meet the Faces You Meet" from the comic book Fever Dreams by Jan Strnad and Richard Corben. The film was co-written, animated, and directed by J. Allen Williams and stars Samuel Hunt, Robert Picardo, Kassandra Wright, Lillie Young, and Shawn Young alongside the voices of Patton Oswalt and Patrick Warburton. It was premiered at the 2022 Cannes Film Festival on May 22, 2022, and was released for streaming in North America on August 9, 2022.

== Plot ==
In the distant future, Friz and his symbiotically linked spaceship MEAD (Mobile Extrasensory Autonomous Deceptor) are on the run from a group of bounty hunters. Using a series of telepathically projected illusions, they are able to evade their pursuers, but unwitting cause the bounty hunters to destroy their own spaceship.

They see a person in a spacesuit floating among the wreckage, however, and decide to bring its unconscious occupant aboard. Removing the spacesuit, they discover that its wearer is in fact an escaped prison inmate named Phoebe, whom the bounty hunters had previously captured. She awakens and reveals that she knows who they are and that they are wanted on every planet in the Solar System. Suspicious of her new captors at first, Phoebe begins to trust Friz and MEAD as they tell her the story of their escape from a military testing facility.

MEAD, it turns out, was designed as a weapon of war, but, thanks to the pacifistic tendencies of his original programmer Tam, would not kill for the military. This enraged the director of the program Admiral Gillette, who responded by trying to decommission MEAD and imprisoning Friz. They were rescued by Tam, who had fallen in love with Friz over their time together. During their escape, however, Gillette murdered Tam and critically injured Friz. MEAD responded by closing a door on Gillette, severing his hand from his arm, which they now keep as a prize.

Having learned their backstory, Phoebe decides not to steal their shuttle or turn them in for the ransom.

Running low on fuel, the trio decide to steal dark matter energy from Ganymede base, where they know Admiral Gillette will be waiting for them. Once again using a series of projected illusions, including one of a popular children's toy Timmy the Wunderbot, they are able to evade the base security and steal enough dark matter energy to last them indefinitely.

Admiral Gillette pursues MEAD and Friz into space aboard a large spaceship named Achilles and, unbeknownst to them, carries with him a special helmet that allows him to differentiate reality from their illusions. While they are able to deceive other members of Gillette's crew with their illusions, including his second-in-command Sternhagen, Gillette is able to direct them enough to fire some damaging shots at MEAD. Phoebe attempts to repair MEAD by connecting a dark matter pod they had earlier stolen from Ganymede, but is shocked in the process.

Instead of trying to fool the crew of what's happening outside the ship, Friz and MEAD instead project an illusion of Gillette on the bridge as hideous monster so that the crew won't listen to his commands. Despite the chaos aboard their vessel, the Achilles crew are still able to deliver a crippling shot at MEAD.

Sternhagen and the rest of the bridge crew, deciding they've finally had enough of his vendetta, turn on Gillette and try to force him to break off his mad pursuit. A firefight ensues, resulting in the deaths of everyone aboard the bridge—including Admiral Gillette.

MEAD slowly deactivates, revealing that Friz's good looks were an illusion to cover the hideous burns he'd received while first escaping from Gillette. He tells Phoebe to leave, and sinks into despair as she flies off in the shuttle to surrender herself to the surviving crew of the Achilles.

While Friz is unconscious, however, MEAD is able to restore power using the dark matter pod Phoebe had connected earlier. While first suggesting they could go anywhere they like, MEAD and Friz decide to return to rescue Phoebe from prison.

== Cast ==
- Samuel Hunt as Friz
- Patton Oswalt as the voice of M.E.A.D. (Mobile Extrasensory Autonomous Deceptor)
- Robert Picardo as Admiral Gillette
- Patrick Warburton as the voice of Timmy the Wunderbot
- Kassandra Wright as Tam
- Lillie Young as Phoebe
- Shawn Young as Sternhagen
- Nathan Shelton as Achilles Navigator Perry / Kawolski / Spunkmeyer
- Connor J. Matthews as Achilles Gunner Russell
- M. Scott Thomas as Medusa Captain Simmons

== Production ==
=== Pre-production ===
Parallax Studio first announced preproduction on MEAD (then under working title To Meet the Faces You Meet) in May 2020 when it launched a Kickstarter to raise additional finances for the production. The Kickstarter closed on June 14, 2020, having raised $29,600—18% more than its original $25,000 goal.

In July 2020, it was announced that Patrick Warburton and Samuel Hunt had joined the cast. In September 2020, it was announced that Robert Picardo had also joined the cast.

=== Filming ===
The film was shot on location outside of Springfield, Missouri. Principal photography began in late September and ended in early October 2021.

== Release ==
The film was given its world premiere during the 2022 Cannes Film Festival on May 22, 2022 as part of a four-film showcase by distributor Vision Films. Its North American premiere took place at the Orinda Theatre in Orinda, California, on August 6, 2022.

The film was picked up for North American distribution by Vision Films, which released the film for streaming on August 9, 2022.

== Reception ==
MEAD has received generally positive reviews from film critics. Andrew Stover of Film Threat described the film as "commendable in its scope, dazzling with action, humor, and heart" and called it "a fun, wacky live-action and animated journey through a galaxy not yet explored."
