= Bill Bruce (guitarist) =

American guitarist

- Born: William Bruce; United States
- Occupations: Guitarist, producer, songwriter
- Years active: 1990s–present

Bill Bruce is an American guitarist, producer, and songwriter, best known for his work co-composing the soundtrack to the independent, science fiction video game Darkstar: The Interactive Movie (2010).

== Career ==
During the early 1990s, Bruce was lead guitarist in the rock band Wilder, where he first worked with musicians J. Allen Williams and Jimmy Pitts.

In April 2009, Bruce released a solo album titled Acoustic Sides featuring ten original tracks at a running time of approximately 30 minutes.

In 2010, Bruce co-composed the critically acclaimed soundtrack to the independent video game Darkstar: The Interactive Movie with bass guitarist (and Darkstar creator) J. Allen Williams and keyboardist Jimmy Pitts. Though the game was originally intended to be co-scored with music by the popular rock band Rush, production negotiations with Universal Music (who retain much of the rights to Rush music) eventually deteriorated and the Rush soundtrack was subsequently replaced with an entirely original score by Pitts, Williams, and Bruce.

In 2011, Bruce produced the album Jah Roots for reggae musician, former Jah Roots lead singer, and GanJah records founder Josh Heinrichs, which debuted number six on the iTunes Store Top 200 Best Selling Reggae Albums. Bruce also co-produced Heinrichs' fifth solo album Satisfied. In an October 2011 interview, Heinrichs described Bruce as "a good friend, amazing guitar player and producer".
