= The Great Time Machine Hoax =

1964 novel by Keith Laumer

- first edition of The Great Time Machine Hoax
- Author: Keith Laumer
- Language: English
- Genre: Science fiction
- Publisher: Simon & Schuster
- Publication date: 1964
- Publication place: United States
- Media type: Print (hardback)
- Pages: 190

The Great Time Machine Hoax is a science fiction novel by American writer Keith Laumer, an expansion of his novelette serialized in Fantastic Magazine under the title of "A Hoax in Time" from June–August 1963. For the novel version Laumer altered the framing story, rearranged the order of the narrative, and added a section not found in the earlier version. The book was originally published in hardcover by Simon & Schuster in September 1964, and in paperback by Pocket Books in August 1965. Later paperback editions were published by Award Books in 1974 and Ace Books in 1978 and 1984; the novel was also reprinted in the collection Keith Laumer: the Lighter Side, published by Baen Books in 2002, and in an omnibus edition with Poul Anderson's Inside Earth as A Hoax in Time/Inside Earth (Armchair Fiction Double Novel #31), published by Armchair Fiction in 2011. It has also been translated into French under the title L'Ordinateur Désordonné

== Synopsis ==
Chester W. Chester IV inherits a run-down mansion and millions in back taxes. In order to pay the taxes, he initially decides to auction off the mansion and its contents, including a massive computer (the Generalized Nonlinear Extrapolator, or "Genie").

However, while examining the mansion and the computer with his friend Case Mulvihill, he finds the computer can solve complex problems involving historical fact and display realistic images of them. He hits on the idea of using its capabilities to create an elaborate hoax ... a fake time machine. Accordingly, he asks the computer to show him "real, three-D, big as life dinosaurs and plenty of em - and how about a four-wall presentation?" The computer asks if it should employ a method of doing so that "is a purely theoretical approach, which might prove simpler, if feasible, and would perhaps provide total verisimilitude..."

Chester tells the computer to "go to it" and the computer does. However, the computer has managed to actually transport the two through time, and on their second trip back, before they realize that they actually do have a time machine, they make the mistake of leaving their arrival area, and become trapped in the past. Even when they manage to return to the present, their actions in the past have altered it completely, but they are able to use the computer to (perhaps, more or less) restore everything to the way it was.

== Reception ==
Algis Budrys gave the novel a mixed review, writing that while Laumer did many things well, his attempt to bring widely disparate elements together is unsuccessful, ending up without "even one whole book to show for it".
