= Jame Retief =

Fictional character by Keith Laumer

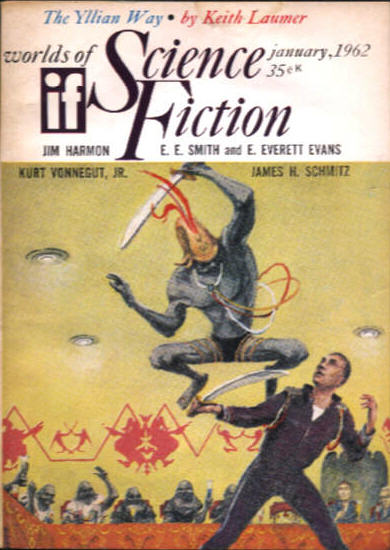
Laumer's "The Yillian Way", a Retief story, took the cover of the January 1962 issue of If.

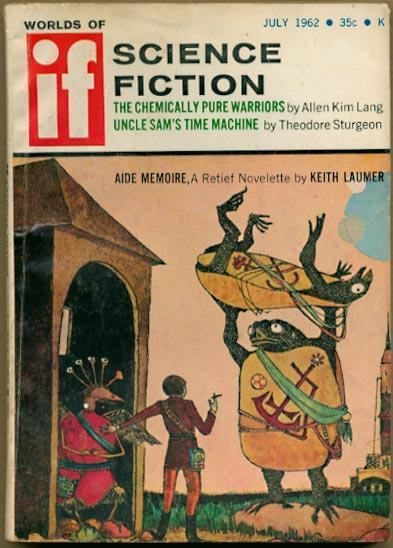
Another Retief story, "Aide-Memoire", was cover-featured on the July 1962 If.

Jame Retief is the main character in a series of satirical science fiction stories by Keith Laumer. The stories were written over a span of thirty years beginning in the early 1960s, without much regard for chronology or any particular scheme.

Detailing the travails of Jame Retief in the Corps Diplomatique Terrestrienne (CDT), the stories have a base in Laumer's experiences in the United States Foreign Service, notably his time as vice consul in Burma in the 1950s. Reorganizations in the Foreign Service both before and after World War II were a source of considerable conflict at the time, as the diplomatic "old guard" were confronted with a new world situation and a new generation of diplomats, men like Laumer, who took a more pragmatic approach to the service. This conflict undoubtedly informs the Retief stories, in which stubborn and often ignorant superiors mired in bureaucracy cause him endless difficulties in the carrying out of his duties.

The first Retief story, Diplomat-at-Arms, appeared in the magazine Fantastic Science Fiction Stories (volume 9, number 1) in January 1960.

== History, skills and appearance ==
Retief's physical appearance is rarely described and then only in the broadest of terms (for example, in Retief's War, it is stated that he is 6'3" tall), though his activities within the stories indicate that he is physically fit and quite athletic, with unusual upper-body strength. In the various stories, Retief can be found swimming, skiing, mountain climbing, scuba diving, combat driving, and piloting various types of air- and spacecraft. He also shows a wide knowledge of history, art, languages, and politics, usually beyond that of his superiors in the CDT.

According to Jan Strnad, who adapted several Retief stories into a comic book series published by Mad Dog Comics in the mid-80s, Laumer informed him that he had always pictured Retief as having black hair, and looking somewhat like Cary Grant. Laumer also indicated that he was displeased with the covers of the mid-80s Baen Books reprintings of the Retief books, since they presented Retief as a blond-haired character. The model for these book covers was Corbin Bernsen.

In many of the stories Retief is shown to have a taste for fine wine, though he doesn't hesitate to down a prospector's homemade booze if offered. He also enjoys fine cigars and fine food as well. One also notices that women in the storylines tend to fall for him even if they are already in relationships, and he behaves more like a gentleman than anyone while simultaneously being the most uncouth by disregarding Corps protocol.

The origins of the character's name are likely South African: "Retief" is an Afrikaans surname common among the descendants of French Huguenots in South Africa. During an interview with Paul Walker (found in "Speaking of Science Fiction", 1972), Laumer states:

Inadvertently, I dredged the name Retief up from the depths of my subconscious; I could taste the flavor of the name, but I couldn't quite put my finger on it. I thought of various place names such as Tenerife and Recife and finally Retief popped into my mind. Many years later, Jack Gaughan pointed out to me that an actual historical character named Retief had lived in South Africa and had been massacred by the Zulus and been mentioned in an H. Rider Haggard novel, Marie. I had read the book but had no conscious recollection of it.

Algis Budrys noted that the name "Retief" is, approximately, "fighter pronounced backwards".

== Themes ==
In the course of the stories, Retief encounters and resolves problems, usually between multiple parties, on numerous worlds. Whether establishing new missions on alien worlds, dealing with the clash of self-determination with established interests, preventing war, or solving cultural clashes, the devil is in the detail. He is master of derring-do, a cunning, fast-thinking, smooth-talking, tough brawler, solving problems through the rapid application of clever dealing, judicious violence, and complete disregard for the directives of the Corps and his immediate superiors. In contrast, most of his fellow diplomats in the CDT are protocol-obsessed, petty, small-minded, arrogant, ignorant, cowardly, and notoriously corrupt. Naturally Retief's career in the CDT is often stalled and he is very poorly regarded by his peers. The only member of the CDT who has any respect whatsoever for Retief's resourcefulness (grudging though it may be) is Retief's immediate superior, a feckless, pencil-pushing career bureaucrat named Ben Magnan who often ends up in the field with Retief.

Many stories begin with a quote from the official CDT history, praising the Corps' high-minded ideals and giving all the credit for the triumph in the following story to anyone other than Retief. Targets of bureaucratic and geo-political excess skewered by Laumer include hair-splitting diplomatic protocol (often represented by required dress — the early late evening hemidemisemi-formalwear, for example), meaningless awards (the fig leaf with clusters), the Cold War (the alien race known as the Groaci are direct analogues to the USSR in many stories), and a panoply of excruciatingly nuanced facial expressions, catalogued by number in the official CDT handbook, and exemplified in the following quote:

"A most perceptive observation, Chester", Earlyworm said, bestowing a 24-w (Gracious Condescension) leavened with a hint of 7-y (Expectation of Great Things in Due Course) on the lucky bureaucrat, at which his fellow underlings around the table were quick to bombard him with approbation, ranging from Faintlady's 12.7-x (Knew You Had It In You, Fella) to Felix's more restrained 119-a (We're All Pulling For You, Lad), to which he responded with a shy 3-v (Modest Awareness of Virtue).
"In fact", Earlyworm interjected a Cold Return to Objectivity (91-s) into the lightning interplay of ritual grimacing ...

== Reception ==
Reviewing Galactic Diplomat, an early Retief collection, Algis Budrys reported that he "enjoyed the daylights out of this book, without for an instant being able to distinguish between one story and the next".

Theodore Sturgeon rather caustically dismissed the series in 1971, saying: "I find nothing admirable or amusing about lies and double-dealing ... What slams the ultimate lid on the whole scam is Laumer/Retief's light-hearted callousness toward one species or another of funny little green niggers".

Retief is featured in the Aldebaran III "world" (story) written by Peter Langston for Wander his text adventure game engine.

== Connections to the Bolo series ==
The Retief stories seem to have a loose connection to the Bolo stories, also created by Laumer. Several Retief stories make references to the Concordiat of the Bolo series. There are hints that the Concordiat had ceased to exist by the time of Retief. There are also brief references of technology mentioned in the Bolo works. In the Retief story "Courier", a Bolo tank makes an appearance. In "Cultural Exchange", Bolo Model WV/1 tractors are mentioned for strip mining. They are Continental Siege Units with half-megaton-per-second firepower—plus a blade added for demolition work. However, it is not known whether or not Laumer intended for both series to be treated as one universe, or just have similar elements.

== List of stories ==
=== By Keith Laumer ===
==== Stories ====
- "Diplomat-at-Arms", Fantastic, January 1960.

In his gray-haired years, Retief goes undercover on a planet of cavaliers to see if the Emperor really has returned and is fomenting intergalactic war. Chronologically this is the last story in the series.

- "The Frozen Planet" (aka "Courier"), If, September 1961.

The CDT's toughest diplomat busts heads to reach a hardscrabble planet facing imminent invasion.

- "Gambler's World" (aka "Palace Revolution"), If, November 1961.

Dodging assassins, Retief and Magnan enter a gambling hall to find a kingpin gambling with his planet's future.

- "The Yillian Way" (aka "Protocol"), If, January 1962.

The Yill deliberately insult the Terran ambassadors, and only Retief will drop "protocol" and fight back.

- "The Madman from Earth" (aka "Policy"), If, March 1962.

Stationed on the Groaci home planet, Retief bucks policy and throttles necks to find Terran scouts who vanished nine years ago.

- "Retief of the Red-Tape Mountain" (aka "Sealed Orders"), If, May 1962.

Human settlers and ray-like "Flapjacks" feud in the desert, so Retief walks into enemy territory with a packet of sealed orders as his only weapon.

- "Aide Memoire", If, July 1962.

The Fustians are saddled with burdensome carapaces, rebellious youth, and Groaci advisors, until Retief pulls aside a few curtains.

- "Cultural Exchange", If, September 1962.

So-called "students", "tractors", and "baggage" are en route to an agricultural paradise, until Retief bobbles their paperwork.

- "The Desert and the Stars" (aka "Protest Note"), If, November 1962.

When the Aga Kaga's neo-Mongol hordes land on the planet Flamme, Retief volunteers to deliver the CDT's protest note - along with a stiff uppercut.

- "Saline Solution", If, March 1963.

Hardscrabble miners claim one asteroid, corporate lawyers offer a second, and Retief proves the third time's the charm.

- "Mightiest Qorn" (aka "Ultimatum"), If, July 1963.

The ostrich-like Qornt order the local Terrans to evacuate or suffer war, until Retief steps in.

- "The Governor of Glave" (aka "Native Intelligence"), If, November 1963.

On Glave, the proles have overthrown the technicians, and the infrastructure is falling apart - until Retief makes the rounds.

- "The City That Grew in the Sea" (aka "Wicker Wonderland"), If, March 1964.

The amphibious Poonians live on a vast floating mat of seagrass and wicker, but when Retief goes SCUBA diving, he uncovers a plot to make them homeless.

- "The Prince and the Pirate", If, August 1964.

The monarch is grounded by CDT's fuel embargo and about to be overthrown, while Retief is framed and thrown in jail.

- "The Castle of Light", If, October 1964.

On Yalc, the insectoids have abandoned their cities of glittering glass for the Voom Festival. The Groaci move in. And only Retief thinks to ask what "voom" means.

- "Retief, God-Speaker" (aka "The Brass God"), If, January 1965.

The Hoogans have gotten religion, and are determined to exterminate the Spisms and sacrifice Retief to Uk-Roopa-Tooty.

- "Trick or Treaty", If, August 1965.

On a planet where Terries are non grata, Retief employs a circus troupe to invade a battleship and thwart an invasion.

- "Giant Killer", If, September 1965.

The ambassador has accidentally agreed to destroy Crunderthush, a marauding dinosaur, and Retief is not allowed to help.

- Retief's War, serialized in three parts in If, October, November and December 1965, first book publication 1966.

The planet Quopp sports organic-mechanic life forms that resemble everything from electric dragonflies to living tanks and helicopters, and every tribe wars with every other. The Groaci back the most thuggish tribe to conquer every other tribe as slaves or zombies. Ducking out of the embassy, Retief runs through the jungle to unite the tribes as a resistance army and to rescue some lost Terries. He just needs to avoid being captured, tortured, shot, stomped, or eaten.

- "Dam Nuisance", If, March 1966.

The North Squeem have Groaci, guns, and all the region's water behind a brand new dam - but the South Squeem have Retief.

- "Truce or Consequences", If, November 1966.

The multi-tentacled Blorts and Gloians have been fighting for two hundred years and now can't remember why, so Retief visits what's left of the university to find out.

- "Forest in the Sky", If, February 1967.

The Groaci have designs on a planet of immense trees and its free-floating inhabitants. Retief hopes to intervene, if he's not eaten first.

- "Retief, War Criminal" (aka "The Forbidden City"), If, April 1967.

The Sulinoreans are fading away and the Groaci are moving in, until Retief finds unsuspected allies in the Forbidden City.

- "Clear as Mud" (aka "Grime and Punishment"), If, August 1967.

On Slunch, Retief and Magnan hold the fort against mud volcanoes, plant infestations, and rampaging rodents - until the ambassador lands and makes things worse.

- Retief and the Warlords, 1968.

The lobster-like "Hatracks" are encroaching on frontier "Terry" space. Retief and a rogue Hatrack survive the arena to try and win peace, but the biggest obstacles are idiot commanders on both sides with CDT klutzes muddying the middle.

- "Retief, the Long-Awaited Master" (aka "Mechanical Advantage"), If, April 1969.

When Terries and the Groaci claim the abandoned planet of Verdigris, Retief and Magnan get locked in the cellar, where they meet the forgotten inhabitants.

- "The Piecemakers", If, May–June 1970.

Lobbed between the warring Groaci and Slox, Retief and Magnan crash land on a planet with plans of its own.

- "Ballots and Bandits", If, September–October 1970.

The local chipmunk-beaver-folk are fighting about the upcoming election, and Retief is sent to win over the feistiest tribe, who submit him to The Ordeal.

- "Pime Doesn't Cray", Worlds of If, January–February 1971.

On Squal, where the locals look like spaghetti and speak in spoonerisms, Magnan has lost a Bolshoi-type ballet theater to the Groaci, and Retief has to steal it back.

- "Retief, Insider" (aka "Internal Affair"), If, March–April 1971.

On a planet ravaged by hurricane winds, Retief and Magnan learn the local amoeba-folk have a unique solution to housing.

- Retief's Ransom (aka "The All-Together Planet"), If, September–October 1971.

On the planet Lumbaga, the locals are conglomerates of free-floating organs who mix and match their appearance and fight continuously. The Groaci have some sinister plot afoot, but Retief first has to find his kidnapped boss Magnan.

- "The Garbage Invasion", The Magazine of Fantasy and Science Fiction, December 1972.

A paradise planet is slated to become a Terran theme park or a Groaci dump or a Basuran slag heap, but Retief is there to turn garbage into gold.

- "The Negotiators", Analog Science Fiction/Science Fact, February 1975.

On the water world Sogood, the "Soggies" have failed to appear, so lowest-low Retief is dispatched to question the giant leprous polliwogs lounging on shore.

- "The Hoob Melon Crisis", Retief: Emissary to the Stars, December 1975.

In the land-grab for Froom 93, the Groaci introduce hoob melons, so Retief imports gribble-grubs.

- "The Troubleshooter", Retief: Emissary to the Stars, December 1975.

The planet Furtheron has been invaded by the omnivorous Basurans. The colonists need an army, but only get one lone diplomat and his trusty needle gun.

- "The Secret", Retief: Diplomat at Arms, October 1982.

While the Groaci torture Magnan with old cowboy movies, Retief pursues a magical tea bag used by the local amoeba-people.

- Retief to the Rescue, February 1983.

On the planet Furtheron, Retief must outwit the Groaci to end a civil war.

- The Return of Retief, September 1984.

The alien Ree seek to invade the human Tip Space: the CDT diplomats, hoping to win a truce, send an on-probation Retief to negotiate. This novel also includes "The Secret".

- "Retief and the Pan-Galactic Pageant of Pulchritude", Retief and the Pangalactic Pageant of Pulchritude, March 1986.

The planet Glorb hosts a beauty pageant that the Groaci plan to crash with battle cruisers. Retief has allies in a handful of aliens and the last Bengal Tiger in existence.

- "Retief in the Ruins", Retief in the Ruins, November 1986.

Retief is sent as an observer to the planet Popu-Ri, where humans and Groaci are both plotting to steal alien secrets.

- "There is a Tide", Retief in the Ruins, November 1986.

Retief uncovers a Groaci plan to turn the planet Slub into a resort.

- "The Woomy, Retief in the Ruins, November 1986.

Retief sets out to foil a Groaci attempt to use a local superstition to dominate the planet Snotch.

- "Rank Injustice", New Destinies, March 1987.

A ship bearing 400 alien ambassadors sees every one pull rank to take command when it is holed by a meteor, leaving Retief and Magnan to investigate who planted the meteor.

- Reward for Retief, February 1989.

Retief is assigned to Zany-Doo, a world where thoughts can influence reality.

- Retief and the Rascals, May 1993.

Retief is tasked with stopping the Groaci invading the planet Bloor.

==== Collections ====
- Envoy to New Worlds, August 1963. First issued as Ace Double #F-223 with Flight from Yesterday by Robert Moore Williams. Collects "Protocol", "Sealed Orders", "Cultural Exchange", "Aide Memoire", "Policy" and "Palace Revolution". A Baen Books variant from April 1987, Retief: Envoy to New Worlds, adds "Rank Injustice".
- Galactic Diplomat, 1965. Collects "Ultimatum", "Saline Solution", "The Brass God", "The Castle of Light", "Wicker Wonderland", "Native Intelligence", "The Prince and the Pirate", "Courier" and "Protest Note".
- Retief: Ambassador to Space, 1969. Collects "Giant Killer", "The Forbidden City", "Grime and Punishment", "Dam Nuisance", "Trick or Treaty", "The Forest in the Sky" and "Truce or Consequences".
- Retief of the CDT, July 1971. Collects "Ballots and Bandits", "Mechanical Advantage", "Pime Doesn't Cray", "Internal Affair" and "The Piecemakers".
- Retief: Emissary to the Stars, December 1975. First edition collects "The Hoob Melon Crisis", "The Garbage Invasion", an excerpt from Retief and the Warlords, "The Troubleshooter" and "The Negotiators". The 1979 edition adds "Giant Killer", "The Forest in the Sky" and "Trick or Treaty". The 1985 edition reprints the 1979 edition minus the novel excerpt. The 2016 SF Gateway edition is the 1975 edition with the novel excerpt removed and "Diplomat-at-Arms", "The Secret" and "The All-Together Planet" added.
- Retief at Large, August 1978. Collects "Cultural Exchange", "Saline Solution", "The Castle of Light", "Wicker Wonderland", "The Brass God", "Mechanical Advantage", "Dam Nuisance", "Grime and Punishment", "The Forbidden City", "The Piecemakers", "Ballots and Bandits" and "Pime Doesn't Cray".
- Retief Unbound, May 1979. Collects "Protocol", "Sealed Orders", "Aide Memoire", "Policy", "Palace Revolution" and Retief's Ransom.
- Retief: Diplomat at Arms, October 1982. Collects "Ultimatum", "Native Intelligence", "The Prince and the Pirate", "Courier", "Protest Note", "Truce or Consequences" and "The Secret".
- Retief and the Pangalactic Pageant of Pulchritude, March 1986. Includes "Retief and the Pan-Galactic Pageant of Pulchritude" and Retief's Ransom.
- Retief in the Ruins, November 1986. Collects "Retief in the Ruins", "There is a Tide" and "The Woomy".
- Retief!, January 2002. Collects the contents of Envoy to New Worlds and Galactic Diplomat, Retief's War and "Diplomat-at-Arms", edited by Eric Flint

=== By other authors ===
- Retief's Peace, by William H. Keith, published September 2005.

The imperialistic Krll have started a Peace Movement to drum Terries off the planet, while Retief may be drummed out of the CDT.

== Comics ==
- Keith Laumer's Retief #1–6 (Mad Dog Graphics, April 1987–March 1988), Writer Jan Strnad, Artist Dennis Fujitake

Adapts "Policy", "Sealed Orders", 'Protest Note", "Saline Solution", "Ultimatum" and "Forest in the Sky"

- Retief of the C.D.T. (Mad Dog Graphics, 1988), Writer Jan Strnad, Artist Steve Vance

Adapts "The Woomy"

- Retief #1–6 (Adventure Comics, December 1989–October 1990)

Adapts "The Piecemakers", "Ballots and Bandits", "Mechanical Advantage", "Aide Memoire", Wicker Wonderland and "The Brass God"

- Retief and the Warlords #1–4 (Adventure Comics, January 1991–April 1991)
- Retief - Diplomatic Immunity #1–2 (Adventure Comics, April 1991–May 1991)

Adapts "The Forbidden City" and "The Castle of Light"

- Retief - The Garbage Invasion (Adventure Comics, August 1991)
- Retief - The Giant Killer (Adventure Comics, September 1991)
- Retief - Grime and Punishment (Adventure Comics, November 1991)
