= March Laumer =

American novelist

March Laumer (17 August 1923 – 12 January 2000) was an American author, primarily of books on the Land of Oz.

March Laumer was born in Birmingham, Alabama, the son of an officer in the U.S. Army Air Corps. He was the older brother of science fiction writer Keith Laumer; their youngest brother Frank was also a writer, on historical subjects. March Laumer graduated from the University of Missouri, and taught abroad, including in Ying Wa College (1965–67) in Hong Kong and Turkey. Much of his maturity was spent between residences in Florida and Lund, Sweden.

March began writing his Oz books in 1962 (one year before the publication of the fortieth and last "official" Oz book, Merry Go Round in Oz). He was a frequent correspondent of Ruth Plumly Thompson until her death in 1976. Most of Laumer's books were published by his own small press, Opium Books, in Hong Kong, or Vanitas Press in Lund, Sweden, often with illustrations by Lau Shiu Fan. Laumer's books often make drastic changes to the series and involve adult themes that have led some fans to label them pornography based on some oblique and non-negative references to bestiality and pederasty in The Green Dolphin of Oz (1978), his best known and most widely circulated book, as well as the first to be published. Many of his manuscripts were works in progress for many years, and some of them may have been discarded.

Laumer wrote his books set at specific periods of time, some of them projected into the future. He also incorporated characters and events from the Magic Land books of Alexander Melentyevich Volkov, particularly in Aunt Em and Uncle Henry in Oz: A Traditional Tale of Oz: a darker, more extreme companion piece telling essentially the same story as his more Baumian Uncle Henry and Aunt Em in Oz: The Oz Book for 1911, as well as his apocalyptic conclusions to the series, The Ten Woodmen of Oz: The Oz Book for 1999, and A Farewell to Oz: The Oz Book for 2000.

== Works ==
This is a list of his Oz books in order of continuity, not the order that they were published.

- A Fairy Queen in Oz (1989)
- The China Dog of Oz (with Ruth Tuttle) (1990)
- Uncle Henry and Aunt Em in Oz: The Oz Book for 1911 (with Chris Dulabone) (1984)
- The Careless Kangaroo of Oz: The Oz Book for 1912 (1988)
- The Crown of Oz (with Michael J. Michanczyk) (1991)
- The Charmed Gardens of Oz (1988)
- The Vegetable Man of Oz: The Oz Book for 1943 (with Hakan Larsson, John Plummer, Eileen Ribbler, Michael Vincent) (1990)
- The Magic Mirror of Oz: The Oz Book for 1944 (1985)
- The Frogman of Oz: The Oz Book for 1947 (1986)
- The Umbrellas of Oz: The Oz Book for 1953 (with Irene Schneyder) (1991)
- The Woozy of Oz: The Oz Book for 1954 (1999)
- Dragons in Oz (1998)
- The Green Dolphin of Oz (1978)
- Aunt Em and Uncle Henry in Oz: A Traditional Tale of Oz (1983)
- In Other Lands than Oz (with various others) (1984)
- The Good Witch of Oz (1984)
- The Cloud King of Oz (with Richard E. Blaine) (1994)
- Beenie in Oz (with Keith Laumer, Tyler Jones, Michael J. Michanczyk) (1997)
- The Ten Woodmen of Oz: The Oz Book for 1999 (1987)
- A Farewell to Oz: The Oz Book for 2000 (with Anita McGrew, Gerard Langa, Dina Briones) (1993)

He also proposed numerous other titles such as Jim the Cab-Horse of Oz that he was not able to write before his death. Another book, Fattywiggins and the Caresso-Pigs of Oz was left unfinished and undated, but is available on his website. The Talking City of Oz (1999) is a novel he edited for Ron Baxley, Jr..

He also wrote several non-Oz SF/fantasy works, including Aillin o' My Dreams (A Fantasia on Irish Themes), Fountains, Fireworks and Balloons, and Gay Bravery.
