= Worlds of the Imperium =

1961 novel by Keith Laumer

- First edition
- Author: Keith Laumer
- Cover artist: Ed Valigursky
- Language: English
- Genre: Science fiction
- Publisher: Ace Books
- Publication date: 1962
- Publication place: United States
- Pages: 133
- Followed by: The Other Side of Time

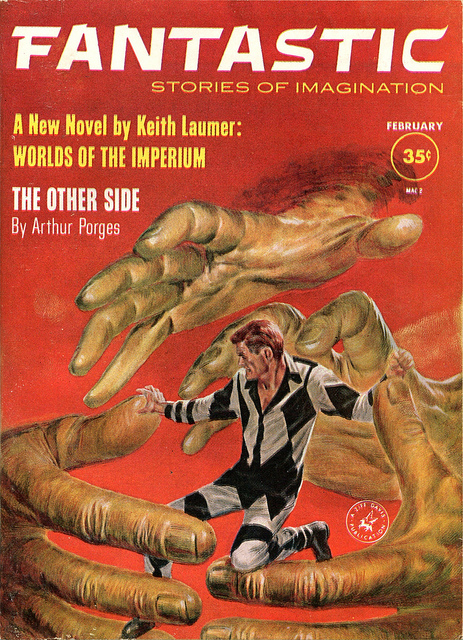
Worlds of the Imperium was serialized in Fantastic in 1961.

Worlds of the Imperium is a science fiction novel by American writer Keith Laumer. It originally appeared in serial form in the magazine Fantastic Stories of the Imagination between February and April 1961. The following year it was published in collected form by Ace Books as an Ace Double with Seven from the Stars by Marion Zimmer Bradley. The movel is an example of an alternate history novel in which a man from our reality becomes involved with another parallel world in which the American Revolution never happened and the secret of inter-world travel came under the control of the British Empire, which forged a unified Imperial world-state known as the Imperium.

== Plot summary ==
Brion Bayard, an American diplomat on assignment in Stockholm, Sweden, is kidnapped by agents from a parallel universe. He is taken to the Earth of the Imperium, which rules most of the civilized world from London, having been formed by the union of the British Empire, which included America, the German and Austro-Hungarian empires, and Sweden. He is impressed by the commitment to duty of the Imperial officials he meets and is attracted to a lady. A mid-rank official is this world's Hermann Göring, who – as Nazi Germany never existed – seems to be a decent person.

The Maxoni-Cocini drive, invented by Italians Giulio Maxoni and Carlo Cocini at the end of the 19th century, enables traveling between parallel universes. However, its development was extremely dangerous; almost all the time lines where it was attempted were destroyed, leaving a region known as the Blight. The few where the Earth survived are known as Blight Insulars, or BIs. BI-1 is the Imperium, where the Maxoni-Cocini drive is used to trade with time lines beyond the Blight. BI-3 is Bayard's home world.

The reason for Bayard's abduction is that the Imperium is under attack from BI-2, where Imperial Germany won the First World War but failed to consolidate its victory, with a chaotic and highly destructive war continuing to rage for generations. This world was not believed to have the Maxoni-Cocini drive until it was determined to be the source of increasingly destructive raids, including the detonation of an atomic bomb, something the Imperium never developed (and does not fully understand). It is ruled by a dictator ... Brion Bayard.

Bayard undergoes extensive training to replace his counterpart undetected and end the raids. The plan falls through almost as soon as he arrives in the new world. For some reason, almost nobody he meets believes his impersonation. The reason becomes apparent when he meets the other Bayard, who had lost both legs in a battle years before.

However, this other Bayard is not the evil dictator he is portrayed to be. He greets his doppelganger as a brother, and tells him how, after being a military officer dedicated to saving the soldiers under his command, he became a dictator after the government he served disintegrated, and tried to save what was left of shattered world. He is based in Algiers, which was less damaged than other parts of the world, and used the remnants of the former French colonial government as the nucleus of his fledgling world government. He knows nothing of the raids on the Imperium. The two Bayards talk over a gourmet meal and discover they have much in common, including similar histories.

Bayard the dictator is assassinated by the real conspirators, who are working for power-hungry factions in the Imperium itself, using stolen technology. Bayard himself is scheduled for a showy execution, after amputation surgery. He is able to escape back to the Imperium and expose the conspirators. Offered the unprecedented opportunity to return to his Earth, he looks at the woman who has become so important to him, and declares, "Home is where the heart is."

== Sequels ==
There are three sequels to this novel. They are The Other Side of Time (1965), Assignment in Nowhere (1968), and Zone Yellow (1990).

== Related works ==
The collection A Century of Science Fiction contains a vignette by Laumer titled Worlds of the Imperium (Extract), which does not appear in the published novel. It depicts a scene of a man with a hoe standing over a plant, and describes the eerie and horrific changes as the same scene shifts across parallel universes. The man becomes an armored beast as the plant becomes ever more hostile and ferocious, and then by degrees the scene shifts back to a man, albeit with green skin and horns, standing with a hoe. The scene may have been inspired by the well-known painting and poem.

== See also ==
- Crosstime Traffic
- The Timeliner Trilogy
- Timeline Wars series
