= Stalkers (comics) =

1990 comic book limited series

Publication information
- Publisher: Epic Comics
- Schedule: Monthly
- Format: Limited series
- Publication date: April 1990 - March 1991
- No. of issues: 12

Creative team
- Created by: Jan Strnad; Mark Verheiden; Mark Texeira

Stalkers is a comic book series that lasted twelve issues created in 1990 by Jan Strnad, Mark Verheiden and Mark Texeira, and published by Marvel Comics imprint Epic Comics.

It concerns a series of people working for a private anti-terrorism security firm that is franchised across the country. Some are mentally unstable and kidnapped to become disposable assassins. A co-story concerns a nihilistic detective and a psychic.
