= Darkstar: The Interactive Movie =

- A promotional flyer for the game
- Developer: Parallax Studio
- Publishers: Parallax Studio; Lace Mamba Global (retail)
- Director: J. Allen Williams
- Producer: J. Allen Williams
- Writer: J. Allen Williams
- Composers: Bill Bruce; Jimmy Pitts
- Platforms: Mac OS X, Windows
- Release: Mac OS X: NA: November 5, 2010; Windows: NA: November 8, 2010; EU: December 16, 2011
- Genre: Interactive movie
- Mode: Single-player

Darkstar: The Interactive Movie is an interactive movie video game written, produced, edited, animated, and directed by J. Allen Williams, owner of the American animation studio Parallax Studio. It stars the actor Clive Robertson and the original cast of the comedy series Mystery Science Theater 3000 (including Trace Beaulieu, Frank Conniff, Joel Hodgson, Mary Jo Pehl, and J. Elvis Weinstein). The game also features animations by the comic book artist Richard Corben and was the final work of the actor Peter Graves, who serves as the game's narrator. Darkstar was released online on November 5, 2010 through the company website and as a downloadable through Strategy First. It was re-released in stores December 9, 2011 in the United Kingdom and Ireland through Lace Mamba Global.

== Gameplay ==
Darkstar differs from the standard game format in that it contains over thirteen hours of live action cinema–far more than any previous full motion video game. Creator and Parallax Studio CEO J. Allen Williams gave a brief description of the project to the website Slightly Deranged saying:

Good or bad, there is nothing traditional about Darkstar. Yes, it does have some puzzles and an inventory of objects you collect and will need from time to time. And there is also a world to explore, executed in a vaguely similar way as you'd see in some of the later Myst series with pre-rendered walks from place to place and full 360 degree up and down panoramas when you stop. That's where the similarity ends. The entire "tour" is peppered with cinema, so when you encounter certain objects or plot points, the "game" breaks into "film" mode for brief story enhancements. My idea from the start is that somebody watching you play Darkstar might wonder whether they are watching a game unfold, or if they are watching a movie. Also, there is a "back-story" that is nearly an hour long that is broken into ten chapters plus a prologue. Ten "bioloks" correspond to each chapter, and as you find them the chapters are unlocked so that you may view them, giving more insight from the past as to what is going on right now in the present. The "bioloks" can be opened in different order depending on the routes you take in the ship and in the story, but they open the story chapters in order 1-10. The prologue is available immediately for free, and any of the flicks may be viewed at any time after they are unlocked. After combining this footage with in-game cinema, you're looking at over four hours of cinema. And any of it may be clicked past if you wish to just explore.

== Plot ==
John O'Neil, the player character and captain of the starship Westwick, awakens from a 300-year cryogenic sleep with no memory of who he is or how he got there. His pilot is still in her cryogenic chamber, his first mate has mysteriously disappeared, and his navigator is dead. The ship is damaged and helplessly adrift in the orbit of the planet Theta Alpha III. As O'Neil explores the ship, he finds out that the Earth was destroyed 300 years ago by human colonists on Mars and that the ship was attacked by boarders from the Mars Armada. He eventually manages to repair the ship and return it to a functional state.

While searching Theta Alpha III for water to use as coolant, O'Neil stumbles upon the ruins of an ancient alien civilization and the still-living creature they worshiped. He also has a run-in with stranded soldiers from Mars and barely escapes with his life. After returning to Westwick with the coolant, O'Neil eventually discovers that the titular Darkstar is a "frozen hole in time"; he and his crew had originally been tasked with entering the Darkstar to travel back to the past and save Earth from destruction. His pilot awakens from cryogenic sleep and together, they confront a massive automated ship from the Mars Armada.

== Cast ==
Darkstar has roughly thirteen hours of live-action cinema. It stars Clive Robertson as Westwick Captain John O'Neil. It also features the original cast of Mystery Science Theater 3000 including its creator Joel Hodgson as Scythe Commander Kane Cooper, Trace Beaulieu as Westwick First Officer Ross Perryman, Frank Conniff as both Westwick Navigator Alan Burk and the voice of the quirky robot SIMON (Semi Intelligent Motorized Observation Network), Mary Jo Pehl as both Bridgebuilder Captain Beth Ingram and the voice of the computer Westwick Main, and J. Elvis Weinstein as Galactic Discovery II Captain Cedrick Stone. Also from MST3K is Beth "Beez" McKeever as the Westwick Pilot Paige Palmer who stars opposite Robertson. Darkstar was also the final work of the actor Peter Graves.

In addition to Clive Robertson and the Mystery Science Theater 3000 players, the production has a cast of nearly fifty actors, almost all of whom are local to Springfield, Missouri and the surrounding area.

== Production ==
Darkstar was written, produced, animated, edited, and directed by J. Allen Williams over the course of nearly a decade. Additional animations for Darkstar were contributed by the American illustrator and comic book artist Richard Corben, best known for creating the character of "Den" featured in the 1981 film Heavy Metal and for his comics featured in the magazine of the same name. Other major crew members included the cinematographer Roger Jared, co-producer Mark L. Walters, and electronic media producer Dahlia Clark.

== Soundtrack ==
Darkstar: Musical Score from the Interactive Movie

Soundtrack album by Jimmy Pitts, Bill Bruce, and J. Allen Williams
- Released: November 5, 2010
- Genre: Soundtrack
- Length: 145 minutes

The soundtrack to Darkstar was composed and performed by Jimmy Pitts (keyboards and pianos), Bill Bruce (guitars and percussion), and J. Allen Williams (bass guitar) under the moniker "Progressive Sound And MetalWorx". Two other performers include Brent Frazier (guitars) and James Lee Dillard (percussion). Additional music for was composed by Ruell Chappell, an original member of the Ozark Mountain Daredevils. Though the soundtrack was originally intended to feature over an hour of music by the rock band Rush, negotiations with Universal Music eventually dissolved and Williams was forced to replace much of the footage with an entirely original score.

The soundtrack was released in tandem with the game and features 38 tracks of music on a 2-disc set.

Reception for the soundtrack has been positive. In a review of Darkstar at diehardgamefan.com, Alex Lucard rated the soundtrack as "Unparalleled" and wrote, "This is without a doubt one of the the [sic] best scores I have heard all year."

== Reception ==
Darkstar received a mixed response from game critics. On the review aggregator Metacritic, the game has a weighted average of 36% indicating "generally unfavorable reviews".

Adventure game reviewers generally praised the game. Drummond Doroski of Adventure Gamers gave it 3 out of 5 stars, writing, "It's not a game for everyone, as some are sure to be turned off by the rarity and simplicity of its puzzles, while others may not relish a return to the infamous days of live actors as their game characters, particularly when some of the acting reminds us why this isn't always a good idea." He concluded, "Darkstar may be light on actual gameplay, but it's rich in cinematic storytelling, and for many science fiction and FMV fans, that's sure to be more than enough." J. Robinson Wheeler of the adventure game website Brass Lantern similarly described it as "challenging, fun, lovingly and painstakingly rendered and crafted, and worth playing." Alex Lucard of Die Hard Game Fan highly praised the game, giving it a final score of "Very Good Game!" and writing, "When all is said and done, Darkstar is one of the best indie games I have ever played in my thirty years of gaming. It's one of the ten best games I have played in 2010. Most of all, it was well worth the wait and then some. Don't let this thing pass you by simply because it doesn't have a multi-million dollar ad budget. You've been warned."

Among the wider gaming community, however, reviews were more mixed. The magazine GamesMaster wrote, "Get past the obtuse mechanics and there's a unique retro charm here." Conversely, GamesTM gave the game 1/10, saying simply "It's not a game." PC PowerPlay also reviewed it negatively, with their 2/10 review calling it "[a] crime. Send this one to the colonies."
