= The Ultimax Man =

1978 novel by Keith Laumer

- First edition Cover art by Marjorie Dressler
- Author: Keith Laumer
- Language: English
- Publisher: St. Martin's Press
- Publication date: 1978
- ISBN: 0-312-82851-9 (first edition)
- Dewey Decimal: 813.54
- LC Class: PZ4.L375 Ul

The Ultimax Man is a 1978 science fiction novel by Keith Laumer. An expansion of the short story "The Wonderful Secret", it was first published by St. Martin's Press.

== Synopsis ==
Petty criminal Damocles Montgomerie is abducted by alien scientist Xorialle, who artificially increases his intelligence and gives him extra skills and abilities, in order to determine the bounds of human potential; however, Montgomerie soon goes far beyond Xorialle's expectations.

== Reception ==
Critical reception of The Ultimax Man has been poor; Don D'Ammassa (who called it "trivial") and James Nicoll (who called it "sad", with a "pedestrian" first half and an "awful" second half) have both noted that Laumer had a stroke while writing the book.

Kirkus Reviews stated that Laumer "never finds the right tone or style", with the majority of the content taking place within "a fog of adolescent facetiousness", while John Clute, writing in The Encyclopedia of Science Fiction, declared that it was "significantly weak", relative to Laumer's earlier work.
