= Clive Robertson (actor) =

British actor (born 1965)

- Born: Clive Gladstone Robertson; 17 December 1965 (age 60); Devizes, Wiltshire, England, United Kingdom
- Occupation: Actor
- Years active: 1992–present

Clive Gladstone Robertson (born 17 December 1965) is an English actor perhaps best known for his roles on the soap opera Sunset Beach, the Canadian science fiction series Starhunter, and the 2010 science fiction computer game Darkstar: The Interactive Movie.

== Biography ==
Born in Devizes, Wiltshire, England, Robertson spent much of his younger life abroad, living in such places as Singapore, Cyprus and the Netherlands, with his family following his RAF fighter pilot father. He was sent back to England at the age of eight, and was a boarder at Marlborough College. After leaving he attended the Oxford School of Business, where he gained a degree in business and management, before starting a career in marketing.

After attending a one-year course at London drama school Arts Educational, Robertson launched his professional acting career playing the lead role of Alan Turing in the play Breaking the Code. He appeared in several plays and TV productions over the next few years, before, in 1996, deciding to try his luck in Hollywood. He landed the role of Ben Evans in Aaron Spelling's new daytime drama Sunset Beach. Robertson played the part for three years, also appearing as his character's evil identical twin, Derek.

After the cancellation of the show in December 1999, Robertson moved into behind the camera work, building a career as a writer and producer. He made his return to TV in 2003, playing interplanetary bounty hunter Travis Montana in one season of the Canadian sci-fi series Starhunter. He also appeared in the soap General Hospital in a recurring role, and worked alongside Julia Roberts, lending his voice to the animated movie The Ant Bully. He has also acted in several computer games and played the lead role in the 2010 science fiction epic Darkstar: The Interactive Movie, which included a large amount of live-action footage of Robertson.

Robertson starred as Theodore Crawford in the MyNetworkTV telenovela Wicked Wicked Games, and subsequently starred in the movie Crazy Girls Undercover.

== Personal life ==
Robertson was married to Australian actress/writer Libby Purvis, whom he met at drama school. The pair moved to America together for him to take the role on Sunset Beach, and married in 1999 on Richard Branson's private island, Necker Island. They split up in 2003 and divorced the following year. They have two children, born October 2002, Alexander and Amelia, who live with their mother in her native Australia. In September 2007 Robertson married his second wife, the linguist and creator of the 'Early Lingo' educational DVD series Caryn Antonini, in Venice, Italy. Their son Cristiano was born in February 2010. Their second son Nicholas was born in August 2012. They lived in Los Angeles, but divorced in 2021.

Robertson works designing and building houses when he is not acting.

== Filmography ==
- Topper (1992)
- Cinderumplestiltskin (TV movie) (1993)
- The Bill (episode "No Name, No Number") (1994) - B Team P.C.
- London Bridge (1995)
- Paparazzo (1995) - Marine Officer on leave
- Before the Killing Starts (TV movie) (1995)
- Sunset Beach (403 episodes) (1997-1999) - Ben Evans, Derek Evans
- V.I.P. (episode "Diagnosis Val") (2002) - Dr. Hank Jonas
- Starhunter (22 episodes) (2002-2004) - Travis Montana
- Medal of Honor: European Assault (2005) - Additional Voices
- The Ant Bully (2006) - Hova's Wasp (voice)
- Wicked Wicked Games (62 episodes) (2006-2007) - Theodore Crawford
- Crazy Girls Undercover (2008) - Damon Archer
- Darkstar: The Interactive Movie (video game) (2010) - Captain John O'Neil
- Darkstar the Motion Picture (2013) - Captain John O'Neil
