= Bolo: Annals of the Dinochrome Brigade =

1976 science fiction novel by Keith Laumer

First edition (publ. Richard M. Powers)

Bolo: Annals of the Dinochrome Brigade is a collection of science fiction stories by American writer Keith Laumer, published in 1976.

== Plot summary ==
Bolo includes six stories about cybertanks called Bolos.

== Reception ==
C. Ben Ostrander reviewed Bolo in The Space Gamer No. 12. Ostrander commented that "Since the Bolo is somewhat similar to the Ogre, we recommend this book to the readers who might not have heard of Keith Laumer, Ogres, or Bolos. It will be a rewarding experience."

== Reviews ==
- Review by Rob Chilson [as by Robert Chilson] (1977) in Delap's F & SF Review, January 1977
- Review by Spider Robinson (1977) in Galaxy, May 1977
- Review by John Collick (1979) in Vector 96
- Review by C. J. Henderson [as by Chris Henderson] (1982) in Dragon Magazine, October 1982
