= Samuel Hunt (actor) =

American actor

Samuel Caleb Hunt (born October 10, 1986) is an American actor best known for his reoccurring role as Greg "Mouse" Gerwitz in the television series Chicago Fire and Chicago P.D., playing Xavier Rosen in the third season of Empire, and for starring in the 2018 film Unbroken: Path to Redemption, in which he portrayed the World War II veteran and evangelist Louis Zamperini.

== Filmography ==
=== Film ===
Year	Title	Role	Notes
2009	The Seven Greatest Bathrooms in Los Angeles	Mel	credited as Caleb Hunt
2012	Falling...		credited as Caleb Hunt
2014	ETXR	Matthew 'Bix' Laughlin	credited as Caleb Hunt
2014	Blood Ransom	Roman	credited as Caleb Hunt
2016	Submerged	Brandon	credited as Caleb Hunt
2016	Dead South	Beauregard Charmington	credited as Caleb Hunt
2018	Unbroken: Path to Redemption	Louis Zamperini	
2018	Swipe Left	Mike Mitchem	
2019	Haunt	Sam	
2022	MEAD	Friz	

=== Television ===
Year	Title	Role	Notes
2012	Days of Our Lives	Andrew	28 episodes, credited as Caleb Hunt
2012	Spread	Cameron	television film, credited as Caleb Hunt
2013	Killing Lincoln	W. H. Crook	television film, credited as Caleb Hunt
2013	Perception	Chad	1 episode, credited as Caleb Hunt
2014-2016	Chicago P.D.	Greg "Mouse" Gerwitz	Recurring role; (seasons 2-4) 35 episodes
2015	Chicago Fire	Greg "Mouse" Gerwitz	Guest role; 2 episodes
2016-2017	Empire	Xavier Rosen	4 episodes
2019	NCIS: New Orleans	Bryce Prescott	1 episode
2019	Best Christmas Ball Ever	Daniel	television film
2019-2020	The L Word: Generation Q	Scott	2 episodes
2021	American Horror Story: Double Feature	Adam	1 episode
