= Keith Laumer =

American science fiction writer (1925–1993)

- Laumer c. 1966
- Born: June 9, 1925; Syracuse, New York, United States
- Died: January 23, 1993 (aged 67)
- Occupations: Novelist, short story author
- Writing career
- Genre: Science fiction
- Notable works: Bolo, Retief

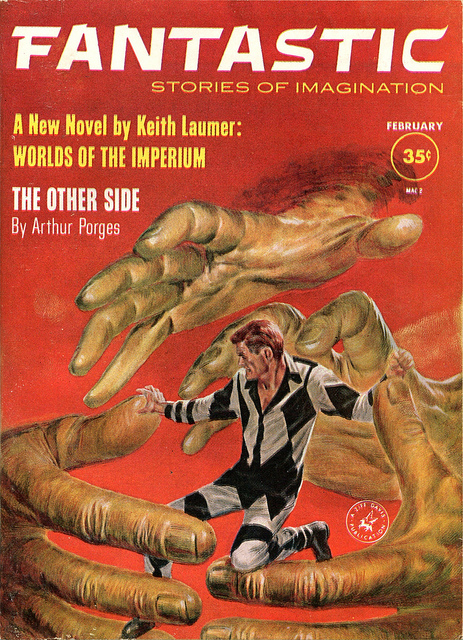
Laumer's novel Worlds of the Imperium was serialized in Fantastic in 1961.

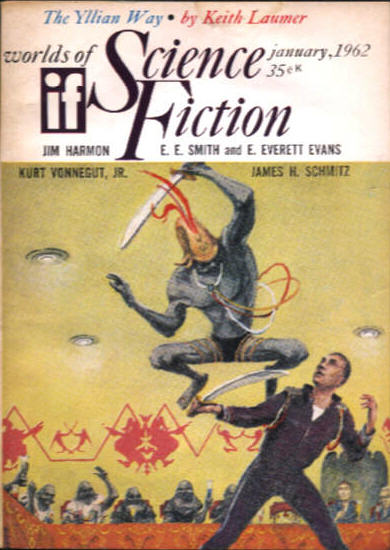
Laumer's "The Yillian Way", a "Retief" story, took the cover of the January 1962 issue of If

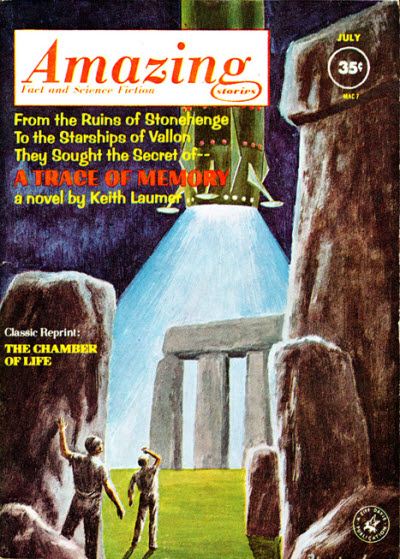
Laumer's novel A Trace of Memory was serialized in Amazing Stories in 1962.

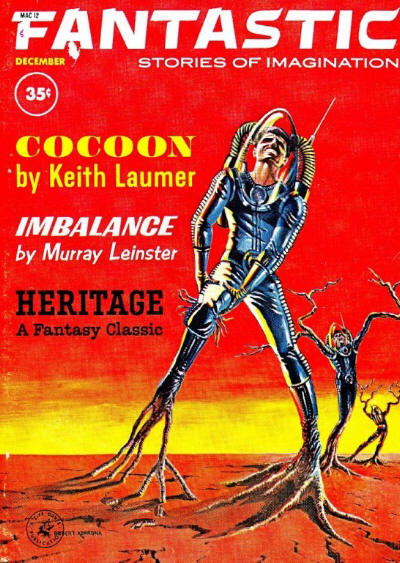
Laumer's "Cocoon" was the cover story for the December 1962 issue of Fantastic

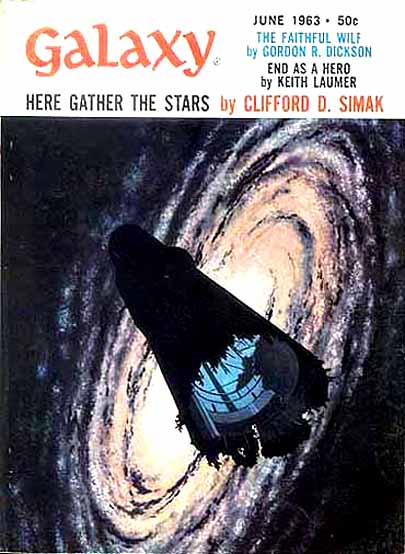
Laumer's novelette "End as a Hero" took the cover of the June 1963 issue of Galaxy Science Fiction

John Keith Laumer (June 9, 1925 – January 23, 1993) was an American science fiction author. Prior to becoming a full-time writer, he was an officer in the United States Air Force and a diplomat in the United States Foreign Service. His older brother March Laumer was also a writer, known for his adult reinterpretations of the Land of Oz (also mentioned in Laumer's The Other Side of Time). Frank Laumer, their youngest brother, is a historian and writer.

== Early life ==
Keith Laumer was born in 1925 in Syracuse, New York. He attended Indiana University, 1943–44, and then served in the United States Army Air Forces in the Second World War in Europe. He later attended Stockholm University, 1948–49, and then received a bachelor's degree in architecture in 1950 from the University of Illinois. He served twice in the US Air Force, 1953–56 and 1960–65, attaining the rank of captain in the latter tour. In between the two terms in the military, Laumer was a member of the US Foreign Service in Burma.

In the late 1950s, Mr. Laumer returned to Florida and purchased a small two-acre island on a lake in Hernando County near Weeki Wachee. He would reside there for the rest of his life.

Around this time he turned his attention to writing, specifically science fiction; his first work, a short story, was published in April 1959.

== Writing career ==
Keith Laumer is best known for his Bolo and Retief stories. Stories from the former chronicle the evolution of super tanks that eventually become self-aware through the constant improvement resulting from centuries of intermittent warfare against various alien races. The latter deals with the adventures of a cynical spacefaring diplomat who constantly has to overcome the red-tape-infused failures of people with names like Ambassador Grossblunder. The Retief stories were greatly influenced by Laumer's earlier career in the US Foreign Service. In an interview with Paul Walker of Luna Monthly, Laumer stated, "I had no shortage of iniquitous memories of the Foreign Service."

Laumer's other adventures often included the subjects of time travel and alternate worlds, such as found in A Trace of Memory, Dinosaur Beach and the Imperium series.

Four of his shorter works received Hugo or Nebula Award nominations ("In the Queue" was nominated for both), and A Plague of Demons (1965) received a nomination for the Nebula Award for Best Novel in 1966.

During his peak years of 1959–1971, Laumer was a prolific science fiction writer. His novels and stories tend to follow one of three patterns:

- fast-paced, straight adventures in time and space, with an emphasis on lone-wolf, latent superhuman protagonists, self-sacrifice, and transcendence
- broad, sometimes over-the-top, comedies
- experimental work verging on New Wave science fiction

In 1971, Laumer suffered a stroke while working on the novel The Ultimax Man. As a result, he was unable to write for a few years. As he explained in an interview with Charles Platt published in Dream Makers Volume II (1983), he refused to accept the doctors' diagnosis. He came up with an alternative explanation and developed an alternative (and very painful) treatment program. Although he was unable to write in the early 1970s, he had a number of books published that had been unpublished at the time of the stroke.

In the mid-1970s, Laumer partially recovered from the stroke and resumed writing. However, the quality of his work suffered, and his career declined. In later years, Laumer also re-used scenarios and characters from earlier works to create new books, which one critic felt limited their appeal:

Alas, Retief to the Rescue doesn't seem so much like a new Retief novel, but a kind of Cuisinart mélange of past books.

His Bolo creations were popular enough that other authors have written standalone science fiction about them.

An anthology "Created by Keith Laumer", Dangerous Vegetables, appeared in 1998. Actually edited by Martin H. Greenberg and Charles G. Waugh, the book's introduction (by Ben Bova) said the book was Laumer's idea, but that he had died without completing it.

== Model airplane designer ==
Laumer was also a model airplane enthusiast, and published two dozen designs between 1956 and 1962 in the U.S. magazines Air Trails, Model Airplane News and Flying Models, as well as the British Aeromodeller. He published one book on the subject, How to Design and Build Flying Models in 1960. His later designs were mostly gas-powered, free-flight planes, and had a whimsical charm with names to match, like the "Twin Lizzie" and the "Lulla-Bi". His designs are still being revisited, reinvented and built today.

== Bibliography ==
=== Bolo ===
Books concerning the Bolo self-aware tanks.

- Bolo: Annals of the Dinochrome Brigade (1976)
- Rogue Bolo (1986)
- The Stars Must Wait (1990)
- The Compleat Bolo (1990) (includes Bolo and Rogue Bolo)

=== Retief ===
Satirical adventures of Jame Retief, the galactic diplomat. Most are collections; novels are shown as (n).

- Envoy to New Worlds (1963) (see Retief Unbound [1979]) later expanded as Retief: Envoy to New Worlds (1987)
- Galactic Diplomat (1965)
- Retief's War (1966) (n)
- Retief and the Warlords (1968) (n)
- Retief: ambassador to space; seven incidents of the Corps diplomatique terrestrienne (1969)
- Retief of the CDT (1971)
- Retief's Ransom (1971) (n)
- Retief: Emissary to the Stars (1975)
- Retief at Large (1978)
- Retief Unbound (1979) (inc Retief's Ransom and five of the six stories from Envoy to New Worlds) (see Retief: Envoy to New Worlds (1987))
- Retief: Diplomat at Arms (1982) (revised version of Galactic Diplomat)
- Retief to the Rescue (1983) (n)
- The Return of Retief (1984) (n)
- Retief in the Ruins (1986) (three stories, two original including the title story)
- Retief and the Pangalactic Pageant of Pulchritude (1986) (including Retief's Ransom and the original title story)
- Retief: Envoy to New Worlds (1987) (Envoy to New Worlds plus one story) (see also Retief Unbound)
- Reward for Retief (1989) (n)
- Retief and the Rascals (1993) (n)
- Retief! (posthumous, ed. Eric Flint) (2002) (Envoy to New Worlds, Galactic Diplomat, Retief's War, plus the first Retief story, "Diplomat-at-Arms" (1960))
- Keith Laumer's Retief: The Worlds of IF Collection (2020) (ed. Christopher Broschell), includes Diplomat-At-Arms, The Frozen Planet, Gambler's World, The Yillian Way, The Madman From Earth, Retief of the Red-Tape Mountain, Aide Memoire, Cultural Exchange, The Desert and the Stars, Saline Solution, Mightiest Qorn, The Governor of Glave, The City That Grew in the Sea, The Prince and the Pirate, The Castle of Light and Retief, God-Speaker.

=== Imperium ===
Books set in the Imperium mythos: a continuum of parallel worlds policed by the Imperium, a government based in an alternate Stockholm. In the science fiction novel Worlds of the Imperium, the Imperium is formed in an alternate history where the American Revolution did not occur, and the British Empire and Germany merged into a unified empire in 1900. The protagonist, American diplomat Brion Bayard, is kidnapped by the Imperium because the Brion Bayard in a third parallel Earth is apparently waging war against the Imperium. Further adventures follow after Bayard decides to remain in the service of the Imperium.

- Worlds of the Imperium (1962)
- The Other Side of Time (1965)
- Assignment in Nowhere (1968)
- Beyond the Imperium (omnibus edition of The Other Side of Time and Assignment in Nowhere) (1981)
- Zone Yellow (1990)
- Imperium (omnibus edition of Worlds of the Imperium, Assignment in Nowhere and The Other Side of Time, ed. Eric Flint) (2005)

=== Time Trap ===
- Time Trap (1970)
- Back to the Time Trap (1992)

=== Lafayette O'Leary ===
A comic equivalent of the Imperium mythos, in which the hero has the ability to travel to feudal/magical alternate Earths.

- The Time Bender (1966)
- The World Shuffler (1970)
- The Shape Changer (1972)
- The Galaxy Builder (1984)
- The Universe Twister (2008) (reprint of The Time Bender, The World Shuffler, and The Shape Changer, edited by Eric Flint)

=== The Avengers (based on the TV series) ===
These were original novels based on the British TV series, The Avengers, featuring John Steed, Emma Peel and Tara King, though they were written exclusively for the US market and never reprinted in the UK.

- #5: The Afrit Affair (1968)
- #6: The Drowned Queen (1968)
- #7: The Gold Bomb (1968)

=== The Invaders (original novels based on the TV series) ===
- The Invaders (UK title The Meteor Men: A Story of Invaders published as by Anthony LeBaron) (1967)
- Enemies From Beyond (1967)
- Army of the Undead by-lined Rafe Bernard (1967) is often mistakenly attributed to Laumer because it is the third entry in the Pyramid Books Invaders novel series as published in the US, but in fact "Bernard" (a pseudonym for Reginald Alec Martin) was one of the two British authors commissioned by Corgi Books in the UK to pen original novels based on the TV show (the other was Peter Leslie). The book appeared as the third title in Corgi's UK line as The Halo Highway. Evidence seems to indicate a reciprocal reprint deal Pyramid worked out with Corgi for use of a single title, since only the Bernard book, but not the Peter Leslie ones, saw print in the United States; while only Laumer's first Invaders title, but not his second, saw print in the United Kingdom. (Verification can be found in Kurt Peer's book TV Tie-Ins (1967, Neptune Publishing and, later, TV Books).

=== Standalone books ===
- A Trace of Memory (1963)
- The Great Time Machine Hoax (1964)
- A Plague of Demons (1965)
- Catastrophe Planet (1966)
- Earthblood (with Rosel George Brown) (1966)
- The Monitors (filmed in 1969) (1966)
- Galactic Odyssey (1967)
- Planet Run (with Gordon R. Dickson) (1967)
- The Long Twilight (1969)
- The House in November (1970, expanded from the If serial The Seeds of Gonyl)
- The Star Treasure (1971)
- Dinosaur Beach (1971) (originally serialized as The Time Sweepers in 1969)
- The Infinite Cage (1972)
- Night of Delusions (1972)
- The Glory Game (1973)
- The Ultimax Man (1978)
- Star Colony (1982)
- End as a Hero (1985) (Expansion of a short story with the same name from 1967.)
- Judson's Eden (1991)
- Beenie in Oz (with March Laumer, Tyler Jones, Michael J. Michanczyk) (1997)

=== Collections ===
- Nine by Laumer (1967)
- Greylorn (1968)
- It's a Mad, Mad, Mad Galaxy (1968)
- The Day Before Forever and Thunderhead (two short novels) (1969)
- Five Fates (1970) (Laumer is lead writer on a concept five authors wrote about)
- Once There Was a Giant (title story appeared as a "short novel" in The Magazine of Fantasy & Science Fiction in November 1968) (1971)
- The Big Show (1972)
- Timetracks (1972)
- The Undefeated (1974)
- The Best of Keith Laumer (1976)
- The Breaking Earth (1981) (Catastrophe Planet plus a pair of essays)
- Knight of Delusions (Night of Delusions plus two short stories) (1982)
- Chrestomathy (1984) (collection including many excerpts)
- Once There Was a Giant (1984) (collection of two novellas plus an appreciation by Sandra Miesel; not related to the 1971 collection of the same name)
- The Other Sky and The House in November (collection of two novellas) (1985)
- The Star Treasure (1986) (the 1971 novel plus three short stories)
- Alien Minds (1991)
- Odyssey (posthumous omnibus, ed. Eric Flint) (2002) (includes Galactic Odyssey and Dinosaur Beach and five short stories)
- Keith Laumer: The Lighter Side (posthumous omnibus, ed. Eric Flint) (2002) (includes Time Trap and The Great Time Machine Hoax and eight short stories, including the 1966 short story "The Body Builders"
- A Plague of Demons and Other Stories (2003) (posthumous omnibus, ed. Eric Flint; A Plague of Demons and seven short stories)
- Future Imperfect (2003) (posthumous omnibus, ed. Eric Flint; includes Catastrophe Planet and six short stories)
- Legions of Space (2004) (posthumous omnibus, ed. Eric Flint; includes A Trace of Memory and Planet Run and three short stories)
- The Long Twilight and Other Stories (2007) (posthumous omnibus, ed. Eric Flint; includes The Long Twilight and Night of Delusions and four short stories)
- Earthblood and Other Stories (2008) (posthumous omnibus, ed. Eric Flint; includes Earthblood (with Rosel George Brown), three Laumer stories, and six of Brown's stories)

=== Short stories ===
- "Doorstep". Galaxy, February 1961.
- "The King of the City". Galaxy, August 1961.
- "Gambler's World". If, November 1961.
- "End as a Hero". Galaxy, June 1963.
- "A Bad Day for Vermin". Galaxy, February 1964.
- "War Against the Yukks". Galaxy, April 1965.
- "The Body Builders". Galaxy, August 1966.
- "The Last Command". Analog Science Fiction, January 1967.
- "Thunderhead". Galaxy, April 1967.
- "The Big Show". Galaxy, February 1968.
- "Test to Destruction". Dangerous Visions, 1967.
- "The Walls". Amazing Stories, 1963.

=== Non-genre ===
- How to Design and Build Flying Models (non-fiction) (1960, revised in 1970)
- Embassy (1965)
- Deadfall (alternative title Fat Chance, filmed as Peeper in 1975) (1971)

=== Comics ===
==== Mad Dog Graphics: Keith Laumer's Retief ====
1. Policy (1987)
2. Sealed Orders (1987)
3. Protest Note (1987)
4. Saline Solution (1987)
5. Ultimatum (1988)
6. The Forest in the Sky (1988)

==== Adventure Comics: Keith Laumer's Retief ====
1. The Peace Makers (1989)
2. Ballots and Bandits (1990)
3. Mechanical Advantage (1990)
4. Aide Memoire (1990)
5. Wicker Wonderland (1990)

==== Adventure Comics: Retief and the Warlords ====
- Four issues (1991)

==== Adventure Comics: Retief: Diplomatic Immunity ====
1. The Forbidden City (1991)
2. The Castle of Light (1991)

==== Adventure Comics: Retief the Giant Killer ====
1. The Giant Killer (1991)

==== Adventure Comics: Retief: Grime & Punishment ====
1. Grime & Punishment (1991)

==== Adventure Comics ====
- 1 Paperback
