= List of television stations in Minnesota =

This is a list of broadcast television stations that are licensed in the U.S. state of Minnesota.

== Full-power ==
- Stations are arranged by media market served and channel position.

Full-power television stations in Minnesota
Media market	Station	Channel	Primary affiliation(s)	Notes	Refs
Alexandria	KONC	7	TCT	(Note: Licensed to Appleton, Minnesota.)	
Alexandria	KWCM-TV	10	PBS		
Alexandria	KSAX	42	ABC, Independent on 42.2	(Note: Satellite of KSTP-TV.)	
Bemidji–Walker	KAWE	9	PBS		
Bemidji–Walker	KCCW-TV	12	CBS	(Note: Satellite of WCCO-TV.)	
Bemidji–Walker	KFTC	26	Fox, MyNetworkTV on 26.2	(Note: Satellite of KMSP-TV.)	
Bemidji–Walker	KAWB	22	PBS	(Note: Licensed to Brainerd, Minnesota.) (Note: Satellite of KAWE.)	
Duluth	KDLH	3	The CW		
Duluth	KBJR-TV	6	NBC, CBS on 6.2, MyNetworkTV on 6.3	(Note: Licensed to Superior, Wisconsin.)	
Duluth	WDSE	8	PBS		
Duluth	WDIO-DT	10	ABC		
Duluth	KQDS-TV	21	Fox		
Duluth	KCWV	27	TCT		
Hibbing	KRII	11	NBC, CBS on 11.2, MyNetworkTV on 11.3	(Note: Licensed to Chisholm, Minnesota.) (Note: Satellite of KBJR-TV.)	
Hibbing	WIRT-DT	13	ABC	(Note: Satellite of WDIO-DT.)	
Hibbing	WRPT	31	PBS	(Note: Satellite of WDSE.)	
Mankato–St. James	KEYC-TV	12	CBS, Fox on 12.2		
Minneapolis–Saint Paul	KTCA-TV	2.1	PBS		
Minneapolis–Saint Paul	KTCI-TV	2.3	PBS		
Minneapolis–Saint Paul	WCCO-TV	4	CBS		
Minneapolis–Saint Paul	KSTP-TV	5.1	ABC		
Minneapolis–Saint Paul	KSTC-TV	5.2	Independent		
Minneapolis–Saint Paul	KMSP-TV	9.1	Fox, MyNetworkTV on 9.10		
Minneapolis–Saint Paul	WFTC	9.2	MyNetworkTV, Fox on 9.1		
Minneapolis–Saint Paul	KARE	11	NBC		
Minneapolis–Saint Paul	WUCW	23	The CW		
Minneapolis–Saint Paul	KPXM-TV	41	Ion Television	(Note: Licensed to St. Cloud, Minnesota.)	
Redwood Falls	KRWF	43	ABC	(Note: Satellite of KSAX.)	
Rochester	KAAL	6	ABC	(Note: Licensed to Austin, Minnesota.)	
Rochester	KTTC	10	NBC, The CW on 10.2		
Rochester	KSMQ-TV	15	PBS		
Rochester	KXLT-TV	47	Fox		
~Grand Forks, ND	KBRR	10	Fox	(Note: Licensed to Thief River Falls, Minnesota.) (Note: Satellite of KVRR.)	
~Grand Forks, ND	KCGE	16	PBS	(Note: Licensed to Crookston, Minnesota.) (Note: Satellite of KFME.)	
~Sioux Falls, SD	KSMN	20	PBS	(Note: Licensed to Worthington, Minnesota.) (Note: Satellite of KWCM-TV.)	

== Low-power ==
Low-power television stations in Minnesota
Media market	Station	Channel	Primary affiliation(s)	Notes	Refs
Alexandria	K22DV-D	1	Selective TV		
Alexandria	K16CO-D	16	Various		
Alexandria	K20AC-D	20	Bloomberg, C-SPAN on 20.3, Local on 20.5		
Alexandria	K29NY-D	29	[Blank]		
Alexandria	K25QV-D	44	3ABN		
Bemidji–Walker	K16KM-D	16	[Blank]		
Bemidji–Walker	K22NL-D	47	3ABN	(Note: Licensed to Wadena, Minnesota.)	
Duluth	K23MQ-D	23	Outlaw		
Duluth	KMYN-LD	32	Telemundo		
Duluth	K35JN-D	35	[Blank]		
Mankato–St. James	KMNF-CD	7	NBC, The CW on 7.2		
Mankato–St. James	K31KV-D	16	Local		
Mankato–St. James	K17MW-D	17	Religious independent		
Mankato–St. James	K18NE-D	18	Bloomberg		
Mankato–St. James	K24JV-D	18	Bloomberg		
Mankato–St. James	K19LI-D	19	Imagen Televisión		
Mankato–St. James	K21DG-D	23.6	[Blank]		
Mankato–St. James	K25QC-D	43	3ABN	(Note: Licensed to Lake Crystal, Minnesota.)	
Mankato–St. James	K22MQ-D	45	TBN		
Mankato–St. James	K29IE-D	62	Daystar		
Minneapolis–Saint Paul	WCMN-LD	13	Religious independent	(Note: Licensed to St. Cloud–Sartell, Minnesota.)	
Minneapolis–Saint Paul	K14RB-D	14	Religious independent		
Minneapolis–Saint Paul	KWJM-LD	15	Various		
Minneapolis–Saint Paul	KMWE-LD	17	Telemundo		
Minneapolis–Saint Paul	KKTW-LD	19	Various		
Minneapolis–Saint Paul	K20KW-D	20	[Blank]		
Minneapolis–Saint Paul	WUMN-LD	21	Univision		
Minneapolis–Saint Paul	KJNK-LD	25	Various		
Minneapolis–Saint Paul	K26PF-D	26	Univision		
Minneapolis–Saint Paul	K33LN-D	33	Various		
Minneapolis–Saint Paul	K28PQ-D	38	Various		
Minneapolis–Saint Paul	KMBD-LD	43	Various		
Minneapolis–Saint Paul	KHVM-LD	48	Salem News Channel		
Minneapolis–Saint Paul	KMQV-LD	49	Various	(Note: Licensed to Rochester, Minnesota.)	
Minneapolis–Saint Paul	KTCJ-LD	50	Salem News Channel		
Minneapolis–Saint Paul	WDMI-LD	62	Daystar		
Olivia	K47JE-D	47	3ABN		
Redwood Falls	K15LS-D	15	[Blank]		
Redwood Falls	K29MQ-D	29	[Blank]		
Redwood Falls	K16MV-D	46	Bloomberg		
Redwood Falls	K34QF-D	51	3ABN	(Note: Licensed to Vesta, Minnesota.)	
Rochester	KXSH-LD	35	Telemundo		
Rochester	K27OW-D	40	Silent		
Rochester	K21NU-D	48	[Blank]	(Note: Licensed to Geneva, Minnesota.)	
Rochester	K25NK-D	58	3ABN		
Willmar	K15IS-D	15	[Blank]		
Willmar	K28IF-D	28	TBN		
Willmar	K34HO-D	34	Silent		
Willmar	K35NR-D	35	Various, Local on 1.1		
~Fort Frances, ON	K35OT-D	39	3ABN	(Note: Licensed to International Falls, Minnesota.)	

== Translators ==
Television station translators in Minnesota
Media market	Station	Channel	Translating	Notes	Refs
Alexandria	K14LZ-D	4	WCCO-TV		
Alexandria	K33DB-D	4	WCCO-TV		
Alexandria	K18DG-D	5.1	KSTP-TV		
Alexandria	K21GN-D	5.2	KSTC-TV		
Alexandria	K30AF-D	9.2	WFTC		
Alexandria	K32EB-D	9.9	KMSP-TV		
Alexandria	K27KN-D	10	KWCM		
Alexandria	K26CL-D	11	KARE		
Alexandria	K17NW-D	14	K14RB-D		
Alexandria	K36KH-D	22	KAWB		
Alexandria	K34AF-D	41	KPXM-TV		
Bemidji–Walker	K36OA-D	9	KAWE	(Note: Licensed to Red Lake, Minnesota.)	
Bemidji–Walker	K18JM-D	11	KRII	(Note: Licensed to Northome, Minnesota.)	
Bemidji–Walker	K20MN-D	11	KRII		
Bemidji–Walker	K22MF-D	12	KCCW-TV		
Bemidji–Walker	K16JD-D	13	WDIO-DT		
Bemidji–Walker	K24MM-D	13	WIRT-DT		
Bemidji–Walker	K36KZ-D	13	WIRT-DT	(Note: Licensed to Max, Minnesota.)	
Bemidji–Walker	K16BQ-D	16	KSAX		
Bemidji–Walker	K17FE-D	17	KSAX		
Bemidji–Walker	K32MF-D	19	WGN-TV		
Bemidji–Walker	K33OG-D	21	KQDS-TV		
Bemidji–Walker	K21HX-D	21	WFTC		
Bemidji–Walker	K24KT-D	24	KARE; KAWE		
Bemidji–Walker	K20NH-D	26	KFTC		
Bemidji–Walker	K34NP-D	26	KFTC		
Bemidji–Walker	K28DD-D	28	KSAX		
Bemidji–Walker	K32FY-D	32	KSAX	(Note: Licensed to Park Rapids, Minnesota.)	
Bemidji–Walker	K35KH-D	35	KSAX		
Duluth	K17OV-D	17	KCWV		
Duluth	K30QX-D	30	KCWV		
Frost	K16MA-D	2.1; 2.3	KTCA-TV; KTCI-TV		
Frost	K21KF-D	2.1; 2.3	KTCA-TV; KTCI-TV		
Frost	K35IU-D	4	WCCO-TV		
Frost	K14KD-D	5.1	KSTP-TV		
Frost	K34NV-D	5.2	KSTC-TV		
Frost	K29IF-D	9.2	WFTC		
Frost	K19LJ-D	9.9	KMSP-TV		
Frost	K31EF-D	11	KARE		
Frost	K27FI-D	16	K31KV-D		
Frost	K23FY-D	23	WUCW		
Frost	K17MX-D	41	KPXM-TV		
Hibbing	K29KE-D	9	KAWE	(Note: Licensed to Big Falls, Minnesota.)	
Hibbing	K35MY-D	9	KAWE	(Note: Licensed to Birchdale, Minnesota.)	
Hibbing	K27LL-D	11	KRII		
Hibbing	K31PK-D	11	KRII		
Hibbing	K34LJ-D	11	KRII	(Note: Licensed to Kabetogama, Minnesota.)	
Hibbing	K23KZ-D	13	WIRT-DT	(Note: Licensed to Bigfork–Marcell, Minnesota.)	
Hibbing	K31MA-D	13	WIRT-DT		
Hibbing	K32JZ-D	13	WIRT-DT		
Hibbing	K33PL-D	13	WIRT-DT		
Hibbing	K21KY-D	21	KQDS-TV		
Hibbing	K29EB-D	21	KQDS-TV		
Hibbing	K15GT-D	21	KQDS-TV		
Hibbing	K22MR-D	21	KQDS-TV	(Note: Licensed to Virginia, Minnesota.)	
Hibbing	K36LA-D	31	WRPT		
Jackson	K22MY-D	2.1; 2.3	KTCA-TV; KTCI-TV		
Jackson	K35IZ-D	4	WCCO-TV		
Jackson	K17MY-D	5.1	KSTP-TV		
Jackson	K29LV-D	5.2	KSTC-TV		
Jackson	K34NU-D	9.2	WFTC		
Jackson	K31NT-D	9.9	KMSP-TV		
Jackson	K19HZ-D	11	KARE		
Jackson	K23FO-D	16	K31KV-D		
Jackson	K28OI-D	23	WUCW		
Jackson	K30KQ-D	41	KPXM-TV		
Jackson	K27NF-D	46	KDLT-TV		
Mankato–St. James	K26CS-D	2.1; 2.3	KTCA-TV; KTCI-TV		
Mankato–St. James	K35KI-D	4	WCCO-TV		
Mankato–St. James	K14KE-D	5.1	KSTP-TV		
Mankato–St. James	K30FN-D	5.2	KSTC-TV		
Mankato–St. James	K33MW-D	7	KMNF-CD		
Mankato–St. James	K23MF-D	9.2	WFTC		
Mankato–St. James	K16KG-D	9.9	KMSP-TV		
Mankato–St. James	K32GX-D	11	KARE		
Mankato–St. James	K34JX-D	11	KARE		
Mankato–St. James	K28OH-D	25	KJNK-LD		
Mankato–St. James	K20LP-D	41	KPXM-TV		
Olivia	K18IR-D	4	WCCO-TV		
Olivia	K21NS-D	5.2	KSTC-TV		
Olivia	K31OR-D	5.2	K21NS-D		
Olivia	K34OZ-D	9.2	WFTC		
Olivia	K20JY-D	10	KWCM		
Olivia	K23FP-D	11	KARE		
Redwood Falls	K33LB-D	4	WCCO-TV		
Redwood Falls	K36KW-D	2.1; 2.3	KTCA-TV; KTCI-TV		
Redwood Falls	K28LL-D	5.1	KSTP-TV		
Redwood Falls	K35NY-D	5.2	KSTC-TV		
Redwood Falls	K19CV-D	9.2	WFTC		
Redwood Falls	K25II-D	10	KWCM-TV		
Redwood Falls	K22KU-D	11	KARE		
Redwood Falls	K17BV-D	41	KPXM-TV		
Rochester	K29OE-D	10	KTTC		
Rochester	K30RA-D	10	KTTC	(Note: Licensed to Racine, Minnesota.)	
Roseau	K30PA-D	4	KXJB-LD		
Roseau	K28PL-D	8	WDAZ-TV		
Roseau	K24MS-D	9	KAWE		
Roseau	K21NF-D	11	KVLY-TV		
Roseau	K26OH-D	17	KBRR		
Williams	K25MW-D	9	KAWE	(Note: Licensed to Baudette, Minnesota.)	
Williams	W32EG-D	9	KAWE		
Williams	K34MC-D	34	KVLY-TV; KXJB-LD		
Williams	K14PH-D	34	K34MC-D		
Williams	K36LW-D	36	K16KE-D		
Williams	K16KE-D	36	WDAZ-TV; KBRR		
Willmar	K33OT-D	4	WCCO-TV		
Willmar	K30FZ-D	9.2	WFTC		
Willmar	K36OL-D	9.9	KMSP-TV		
Willmar	K22ND-D	10	KWCM		
Willmar	K17FA-D	11	KARE		
Willmar	K14LF-D	23	WUCW		
Willmar	K26NU-D	41	KPXM-TV		
Willmar	K19IH-D	42	KSAX		
~Fargo, ND	K08QE-D	8	KWCM-TV	(Note: Licensed to Fergus Falls, Minnesota.)	
~Sioux Falls, SD	K18MO-D	15	KSFY		
~Eau Claire, WI	KQEG-CD	8	WKBT-DT	(Note: Licensed to La Crescent, Minnesota.)	
~Fort Frances, ON	K18MB-D	9	KAWE		
~Fort Frances, ON	K22MZ-D	11	KRII		
~Fort Frances, ON	K24MT-D	13	WIRT-DT		
~Fort Frances, ON	K20NR-D	21	KQDS-TV		

== Defunct ==
- KCCO-TV Alexandria (1958–2017)
- WFTV Duluth (1953–1954)
- WMIN-TV St. Paul–Minneapolis (1953-1955, shared time with WTCN-TV)
