= KEYC-TV =

Television station in Mankato, Minnesota

- Mankato, Minnesota; United States
- Channels: Digital: 12 (VHF); Virtual: 12
- Branding: KEYC; KEYC Fox (12.2); KEYC News Now (newscasts)

Programming
- Affiliations: 12.1: CBS; 12.2: Fox; for others, see § Subchannels

Ownership
- Owner: Gray Media; (Gray Television Licensee, LLC)
- Sister stations: KMNF-CD

History
- First air date: October 5, 1960
- Former channel numbers: Analog: 12 (VHF, 1960–2009); Digital: 38 (UHF, 2002–2009)
- Former affiliations: NBC (1960–1961); UPN (secondary, 1995–2006)
- Call sign meaning: Key City (city slogan for Mankato)

Technical information
- Licensing authority: FCC
- Facility ID: 68853
- ERP: 52.7 kW
- HAAT: 317 m (1,040 ft)
- Transmitter coordinates: 43°56′12.4″N 94°24′38.5″W

Links
- Public license information: Public file; LMS
- Website: www.keyc.com

KEYC-TV (channel 12) is a television station in Mankato, Minnesota, United States, affiliated with CBS and Fox. It is owned by Gray Media alongside low-power, dual NBC/CW+ affiliate KMNF-CD (channel 7). The two stations share studios on Lookout Drive in North Mankato; KEYC-TV's transmitter is located near Lewisville, Minnesota.

The Mankato market is within reach of some television stations based in the Twin Cities. CBS owned-and-operated station WCCO-TV has an over-the-air signal that reaches Mankato proper, and the station is offered locally on Charter Spectrum channel 4. Due to the cable presence of WCCO, KEYC can invoke the Federal Communications Commission (FCC)'s network non-duplication rule resulting in Spectrum blacking out programming from the former during network shows. WCCO's newscasts and some of its syndicated programs can be seen, however.

== History ==
KEYC-TV signed on October 5, 1960, just in time to broadcast the first game of the World Series that day from NBC. It was owned by Lee Enterprises which also started nearby KGLO-TV (now KIMT) in Mason City, Iowa. Less than a year later, KEYC switched its affiliation to CBS which has been maintained to this day. Lee Enterprises, intending to purchase KOIN-TV in Portland, Oregon, was forced to sell KEYC to United Communications in 1977 due to ownership limits imposed by the FCC. During UPN's existence, the station carried some of that network's programming through a secondary arrangement.

KEYC was a major beneficiary of an exception to the FCC's "2 1/2 + 1" plan for allocating VHF television bandwidth. In the early days of broadcast television, there were twelve VHF channels available, and 69 UHF channels (which was later reduced to 56 with the removal of high-band channels 70–83 in the early 1980s). The VHF bands were more desirable because signals broadcasting on that band traveled a longer distance. Because there were only twelve VHF channels available, there were limitations as to how closely the stations could be spaced. With the release of the FCC's Sixth Report and Order in 1952, the Commission outlined a new allocation table for VHF licenses and opened up the UHF band. Through these initiatives, almost all of the United States would be able to receive two commercial VHF channels plus one non-commercial allocation. Most of the rest of the country ("1/2") would be able to receive a third VHF channel. Other areas of the country would be designated as "UHF islands," since they were too close to larger cities for VHF service.

However, what would become of the Mankato market was sandwiched between Minneapolis–Saint Paul (channels 2, 4, 5, 9, and 11) to the north, Rochester (channels 3, 6, and 10) to the east, Sioux Falls (channels 2, 5, 11, and 13) to the west, and Des Moines (channels 5, 8, 11, and 13) to the southeast. This created a large "doughnut" in Mankato where there could only be one VHF license. KEYC was fortunate enough to gain that license. To this day, KEYC is the only full-power commercial station based in Mankato, in the 13th smallest TV market (Nielsen DMA #198). However, KEYC is not without significant competition because outlets from the Twin Cities, the 15th largest market, cover major news and weather events in the region, and their signals are extended into the region via an extensive translator network.

On July 1, 2007, the station signed on a new second digital subchannel and brought Fox programming to the market for the first time; this subchannel replaced Minneapolis stations WFTC (channel 29) and later KMSP-TV, which have both been carried on cable systems in southwestern Minnesota since before the Fox network began operations in 1986. KEYC's broadcasts became digital-only effective June 12, 2009.

KEYC-TV logo until 2020

On February 8, 2019, Gray Television announced it was purchasing the United stations, including KEYC. In advance of the purchase, Gray assumed control of the station via a local marketing agreement (LMA) on March 1. KEYC would be Gray's first station in Minnesota. The sale was completed on May 1.

== Programming ==
KEYC-TV airs the entire CBS schedule; it began clearing the CBS Overnight News when it started 24-hour-a-day broadcasting on September 14, 2020.

KEYC-TV maintains a highly local focus such as through its production of the long-running music series Bandwagon. Another program that had aired throughout almost the entirety of the station's history was a local religious program, I Believe in Miracles, which first aired on February 19, 1961. Miracles aired for the last time on KEYC on February 8, 2015. Various other local programs have aired over the years as well as a variety of specials such as on holiday music or major community issues.

=== Newscasts ===
News logo

On January 15, 2018, KEYC debuted a new weekday morning newscast. KEYC News Now This Morning aired for one hour starting at 6 a.m. On February 25, 2019, it was expanded to 1 1/2 hours starting at 5:30 a.m. On December 2, 2024, Gray removed the morning news to carry KTTC Morning News. On June 16, 2025, Kato Mornings was brought back and is carried from 6 to 7 a.m. There are local news and weather cut-ins during CBS Mornings from 7 to 9 a.m. KEYC News Now offers local newscasts weekdays at noon, 5, 6 and 10 p.m. for a half hour. KEYC News Now at 9 airs seven nights a week on KEYC-DT2. In September 2022, KEYC launched Kato Living, a weekday lifestyle program.

== Technical information ==
=== Subchannels ===
Logo for CBS subchannel

Logo for Fox subchannel

The station's signal is multiplexed:

Subchannels of KEYC-TV
| Subchannel | Res. | Short name | Programming |
|---|---|---|---|
| 12.1 | 1080i | KEYC-HD | CBS |
| 12.2 | 720p | FOX12HD | Fox |
| 12.3 | 480i | ION | Ion |
| 12.4 | 480i | WX | KEYC Weather Now |
| 12.5 | 480i | OXG | Oxygen |
| 12.6 | 480i | 365BLK | 365BLK |

=== Former translator stations ===
The broadcast signal of KEYC was extended by way of three digital translators in southern Minnesota until December 22, 2017, when United Communications could not negotiate a new leasing agreement with tower owner BENCO/CTV.

- K49JG-D 49 Frost
- K50KL-D 50 Jackson
- K38MY-D 38 St. James

The Frost and Jackson translators were located in the Minneapolis–St. Paul market, while the St. James translator was in the Mankato market.
