= WDSE =

WDSE may refer to:

- WDSE (TV), a PBS member station in Duluth, Minnesota, United States
- WDSE-FM, an adult album alternative radio station in Duluth, Minnesota, United States
