= KMNF-CD =

Television station in Mankato, Minnesota

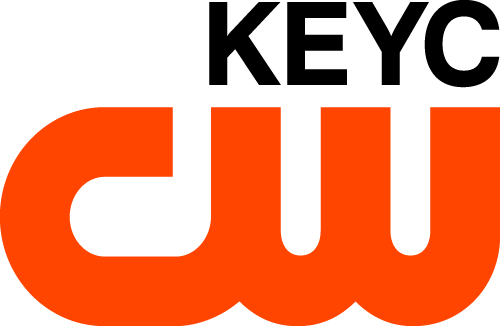
- Mankato, Minnesota (Note: Originally licensed to St. James, Minnesota, as a KEYC-TV translator; moved to Mankato in 2019.); United States
- Channels: Digital: 8 (VHF); Virtual: 7
- Branding: KEYC; KEYC CW (7.2); KEYC News Now (newscasts)

Programming
- Affiliations: 7.1: NBC; 7.2: CW+; 7.3: North Star Sports/MyNetworkTV

Ownership
- Owner: Gray Media; (Gray Television Licensee, LLC)
- Sister stations: KEYC-TV

History
- First air date: March 2012; December 1, 2019 (as a separate station)
- Former call signs: K38MY-D (2011–2019); K13AAR-D (CP/STA, 2018–2019); K07AAH-D (CP, 2019); KMNF-LD (2019–2025)
- Former channel numbers: Digital: 38 (UHF, 2012–2018), 7 (VHF, 2018–2024); Virtual: 12 (2012–2017)
- Former affiliations: CBS and Fox (as translator of KEYC-TV, 2012–2017); Dark (2017–2019); Circle (7.3, 2022–2023); 365BLK (7.3, 2023–2025)
- Call sign meaning: Mankato, New Ulm, and Fairmont

Technical information
- Licensing authority: FCC
- Facility ID: 183814
- Class: CD
- ERP: 3 kW
- HAAT: 292.7 m (960 ft)
- Transmitter coordinates: 43°56′12.3″N 94°24′39″W
- Translator(s): K33MW-D Mankato

Links
- Public license information: Public file; LMS

KMNF-CD (channel 7) is a low-power television station in Mankato, Minnesota, United States, affiliated with NBC and The CW Plus. It is owned by Gray Media alongside KEYC-TV (channel 12), a dual CBS and Fox affiliate. The two stations share studios on Lookout Drive in North Mankato; KMNF-CD's transmitter is located near Lewisville, Minnesota.

== History ==
The KMNF-CD license originated as K38MY-D in St. James, Minnesota, a translator for KEYC-TV (then owned by United Communications) on UHF channel 38 that signed on in March 2012. K38MY-D went off the air on December 21, 2017, after the expiration of its tower lease agreement with BENCO/CTV; KEYC had operated UHF translators from Cooperative TV's Godahl tower since 1993.

On September 14, 2018, K38MY-D was granted a construction permit to move to channel 13 from KEYC-TV's tower as K13AAR-D; the channel change was required following the Federal Communications Commission (FCC)'s spectrum incentive auction and the subsequent repacking of the television band. To maintain its license, the station operated under special temporary authority at reduced power from this facility from November 29 to December 6, 2018.

K13AAR-D was included in Gray Television's 2019 purchase of United Communications' television stations.

On May 23, 2019, the station was granted a construction permit to move to channel 7 as K07AAH-D; on June 3, 2019, the call letters were changed to KMNF-LD, a close match for those originally proposed for sister station KEYC-TV in 1958.

On June 24, 2019, Gray announced that KMNF-LD would launch as early as September as an NBC affiliate, with The CW on its second subchannel. KEYC-TV itself had launched in 1960 as an NBC affiliate, switching to CBS in 1961. For the next 58 years after that, NBC programming was not available over-the-air in the Mankato market. Since 1981, Minneapolis affiliate KARE and Rochester affiliate KTTC had served as the default NBC affiliates for southwestern Minnesota via cable. KMNF-LD's sign-on leaves ABC and PBS as the only networks to not have over-the-air affiliates in Mankato; ABC programming is carried on cable via KSTP-TV and KAAL, and PBS programming carried via KTCA-TV; with KSTP and KTCA being carried on CTV translators K30FN-D (KSTP) and K26CS-D (KTCA) in St. James.

Testing on KMNF-LD began on October 28, 2019. The station officially signed on December 1, 2019.

On January 17, 2023, KMNF-LD began broadcasting translator K33MW-D from the KEYC-TV studio tower.

== Newscasts ==
KMNF-LD began simulcasting some KEYC newscasts on December 2, 2019. Kato Mornings airs weekdays from 6 to 7 a.m. on both KEYC-TV and KMNF-LD. The stations also simulcast the 10 p.m. news on weeknights, with each station airing separate commercials during each simulcast.

On February 21, 2022, KMNF-LD began simulcasting KEYC's 6 p.m. newscast.

On September 3, 2023, KMNF-LD began airing a 5 p.m. newscast on Sunday evenings.

== Subchannels ==
The station's signal is multiplexed:

Subchannels of KMNF-CD
| Subchannel | Res. | Short name | Programming |
|---|---|---|---|
| 7.1 | 1080i | KMNFNBC | NBC |
| 7.2 | 720p | KMNFCW | The CW Plus |
| 7.3 | 720p | KMNFNSS | North Star Sports (primary); MyNetworkTV (secondary) |
