= KUMD =

KUMD may refer to:

- KUMD (FM), a radio station (90.9 FM) licensed to serve Deer Lodge, Montana, United States
- WDSE-FM, a radio station (103.3 FM) licensed to serve Duluth, Minnesota, United States, which held the call sign KUMD-FM from 1982 to 2021
