= Erdahl =

Erdahl may refer to:

- Erdahl (surname)
- Erdahl, Minnesota, United States
- Erdahl Township, Grant County, Minnesota, United States
