= Erdahl (surname) =

Erdahl is a surname. Notable people with the surname include:

- Arlen Erdahl (1931–2023), American politician
- Dale Erdahl (1931–2005), American businessman, farmer, and politician
- Jamie Erdahl (born 1988), American television reporter
- Ludwig B. Erdahl (1889-1969), American farmer and politician
- Paul Erdahl (1902–1985), Norwegian boxer
- Thor Erdahl (born 1951), Norwegian painter
