= Bruce Elving =

American writer on FM broadcasting

Bruce F. Elving (April 19, 1935 – July 24, 2011) was a publisher, FM-radio enthusiast, DXer, and college professor from Duluth, Minnesota. He held a bachelor's degree from the University of Minnesota-Duluth, a master's degree from Iowa State University, and a Ph.D. from Syracuse University.

His interest in FM radio began while the technology was still in its infancy and AM was more popular. He was the author of the FM Atlas, a directory of FM radio stations and translators throughout the United States, Canada, and Mexico. FM Atlas has been published approximately every 18 months from 1971 to its 21st edition in 2010. Elving also published FMedia, a monthly newsletter updating the FM Atlas, compiled from Federal Communications Commission (FCC) and Canadian Radio-television and Telecommunications Commission (CRTC) data, along with information contributed by subscribers. Publication of FMedia began in 1987, continuing until mid-2007, when Elving announced that he was looking for a hobbyist who would take over the newsletter under new ownership. The publication remained out of print for several months, until Elving eventually created a multi-month issue to catch readers up with the changes in station data. Elving's eldest daughter, Kristine Stuart, took over FMedia in January 2008, with Elving taking on a new role of mentor and contributing editor. In March 2010, Kristine published the last issue of the newsletter, when it again went out of print.

Elving was twice given the DXer of the Year award by the Association of North American Radio Clubs, first in 1973 and later in 1986. He wanted to introduce others to the world of FM DXing, and the Worldwide TV-FM DX Association website includes an article by him explaining the process. A commentary in the DX Listening Digest, June 19, 2005, listed Elving among those who had helped create today's DX hobby. The column referred to FM Atlas as "the FM equivalent of the NRC Log" and noted that Elving was a columnist for DXing Horizons magazine.

As an undergraduate student at the University of Minnesota-Duluth during the 1950s, Elving helped found the KUMD radio station (now WDSE-FM at 103.3 FM), which started as a pirate station on AM: "The FCC sent their 'cease and desist' letter to KUOM *770 AM, because they had not heard of a University of Minnesota campus in Duluth. That was after the disgruntled engineer quit and 'spilled the beans.' I wrote an article about that experience, which was published in 'Radio World' newspaper." KUMD celebrated its 50th anniversary in 2007, and a photo of Elving is featured on its website as one of its founders.

Elving was also noted for his Mail order sales of radios modified to receive subcarrier signals from FM radio stations. These little-known signals, which require special receiving equipment to hear, often consist of background music for retail establishments, newsfeeds, and reading services for the blind. Elving advocated these services as superior to newer technology such as HD Radio. In March 1989, Monitoring Times published an article by Elving entitled "SCA: FM Radio's Alter-Ego - The Radio the FCC Doesn't Want You to Own." In 1997, Elving was quoted in an article in The New York Times discussing Radio Data System (RDS) signals, which ride on FM subcarriers and were thought to be the future of radio.

Elving advocated expanding the FM broadcast band below its current 88 MHz limit following the transition from analog to digital television, freeing up the frequencies used for television channels 2–6, and even reinstating the original 42-50 MHz FM band for hobbyist and community broadcasting. This band is currently assigned to a seldom-used two-way communications service. The FCC has issued a long-term experimental license to one broadcaster, WA2XMN, 42.8 MHz, to use this band.

Elving, 76, had a heart attack and died on July 24, 2011, in California. He had three daughters. His 68-year-old wife, Carol, died on August 10, 2015. Online tributes to him in the radio community reflect his impact on the DXing hobby and the FM industry, describing him as a "professor of FM radio" and a champion of the underdog.

== See also ==
- Second audio program, subcarrier system used for alternative audio programming on television channels
- Subsidiary communications authority
