= Bandwagon (American TV program) =

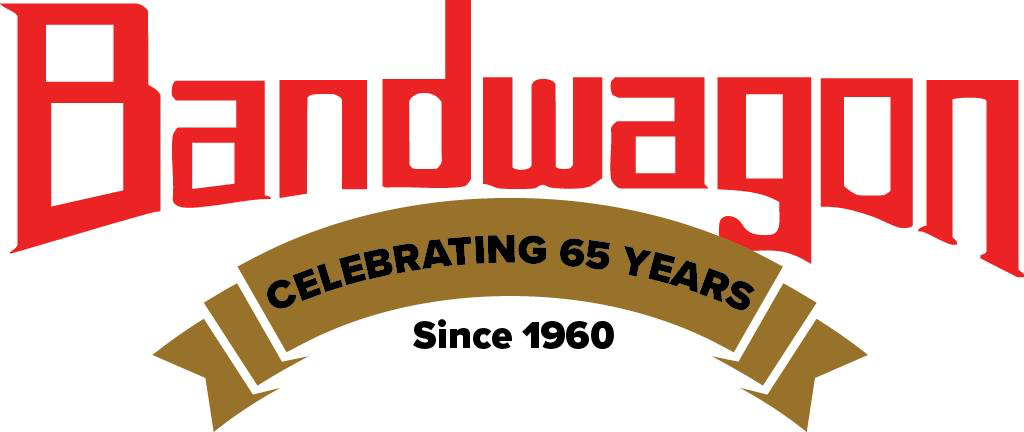
- Starring: Shawn Cable
- Country of origin: United States

Production
- Running time: 30 minutes

Original release
- Network: KEYC-TV
- Release: November 21, 1960 – present

Bandwagon is a half-hour music program featuring traditional dance music, most notably polka, performed in front of a ballroom audience dancing along. The program is produced and broadcast by KEYC-TV in Mankato, Minnesota. The show began airing November 21, 1960. The title Bandwagon was added on March 30, 1961. It is one of the longest-running televised music programs in the world. The authors Russ Ringsak and Denise Remick called the show "the longest-running live polka show" in the United States.

In the past, the show was sponsored by John Deere, and aired as the John Deere Bandwagon; later it was sponsored by Randall's, a defunct Midwestern supermarket chain, and was titled as Randall's Bandwagon.

Earl Lamont was the original host of the program. Chuck Pasek began hosting the program in 1962. Dick Ginn, who worked for Randall's and was involved in their sponsorship of the show since 1974, joined Pasek in hosting the show between 1974 and the middle of the 1990s. Following Chuck Pasek's retirement in 1995, Tom Goetzinger began co-hosting the program. Bandwagon's current host, as of May 2023, is KEYC chief meteorologist Shawn Cable.

The format of the show is simple: the host introduces the band for the week, which performs a number of music selections. During each show, the second song is referenced as the roll-up selection, it features submitted birthday and anniversary announcements of viewers rolling-up over the screen.

The show formerly originated from KEYC's studio in North Mankato, Minnesota, and now is recorded at the Kato Ballroom in Mankato. In addition, in the past some episodes have been recorded on location, such as at Heritagefest, a former German heritage festival in New Ulm, Minnesota. Four half-hour episodes for the following month are usually recorded the first Monday of every month, and admission is $10.00 for three hours of entertainment.
