= Hero Elementary =

PBS Kids animated TV series (2020–2022)

- Genre: Children's television series; Educational; Superhero
- Created by: Christine Ferraro; Carol-Lynn Parente
- Based on: "Super Hero School" by Aaron Reynolds
- Directed by: Paul Hunt; Suren Perera (ep. 2)
- Voices of: Veronica Hortiguela; Jadiel Dowlin; Stephany Seki; Stacey DePass; Carlos Díaz
- Theme music composer: Steve D'Angelo; Terry Tompkins
- Opening theme: "(You Belong at) Hero Elementary", performed by Divine Brown and Cal Dodd
- Ending theme: "(You Belong at) Hero Elementary" (instrumental) (End Credits Version)
- Composer: Lorenzo Castelli
- Countries of origin: United States; Canada
- Original language: English
- No. of seasons: 1
- No. of episodes: 40 (77 segments)

Production
- Executive producers: Carol-Lynn Parente; Lisa Olfman; Joy Rosen; Joann Freese; Christine Ferraro
- Producer: Trent Locke
- Running time: 22 minutes (11 minutes per segment)
- Production companies: Twin Cities PBS; Portfolio Entertainment

Original release
- Network: TVOKids (Canada); PBS Kids (US)
- Release: June 1, 2020 – January 4, 2022

Hero Elementary is a children's animated television series created and produced by Portfolio Entertainment and Twin Cities PBS. The series ran from June 1, 2020 to January 4, 2022, on PBS Kids. The series was created by co-creators Carol-Lynn Parente and Christine Ferraro, who previously worked on Sesame Street.

The series involves the students of "The Sparks' Crew"—Lucita Sky, AJ Gadgets, Sara Snap and Benny Bubbles—who are trained in superheroics by their quirky and enthusiastic teacher, Mr. Sparks. Together the students work as a team, using their own unique superpowers, as well as the "Superpowers of Science" to help people, solve problems, and try to make the world a better place.

The series has 40 half-hour episodes, each of them containing two segments.

Reruns of Hero Elementary aired on PBS Kids (block) on PBS until February 2, 2024 (3 days before the premiere of Lyla in the Loop). It still airs on PBS stations and the PBS Kids 24/7 channel.

== Premise ==
The series involves a group of four students - nicknamed the "Sparks' Crew" - who attend the titular Hero Elementary: Lucita Sky, AJ Gadgets, Sara Snap, and Benny Bubbles in addition to the class' pet hamster, Fur Blur, and under the guidance of their teacher, Mr. Enrique Sparks.

== Characters ==
=== Main ===
The Sparks' Crew are the main characters of the series. The members are as follows:

- Lucita Sky (voiced by Veronica Hortiguela) is a good-natured and caring Hispanic-American girl who inherited the power of flight from her grandmother. She serves as the leader of the Sparks' Crew. Ironically, she is acrophobic and appears to also suffer from vertigo.
- AJ Gadgets (voiced by Jadiel Dowlin) is a brilliant African-American boy who has the power of thought projection, meaning he can project pictures of his own thoughts in front of others, and also enjoys inventing all kinds of gadgets. He has a backpack that contains all his super inventions and doubles as a jet pack for transportation. Though rarely mentioned, AJ is autistic, and especially sensitive to loud noises and wet textures. His autism is revealed in the episode "AJ's Extra Superpower."
- Sara Snap (voiced by Stephany Seki) is a tomboyish and mixed Japanese-American girl (it is implied that her mother is Caucasian-American, while her father is Japanese-American) who has both the power of super strength and teleportation. At times, Sara's teleportation can malfunction and take her to the wrong places. She is also allergic to coconuts, which temporarily remove her powers.
- Benny Bubbles (voiced by Stacey DePass) is a cheerful and good-natured Caucasian-American boy able to create bubbles for various purposes. He is also an avid animal lover, particularly jumping in to rescue abused or frightened animals during missions. He very often provides comic relief throughout the series, cracking jokes/puns and making flashy introductions.
- Mr. Enrique Sparks (voiced by Carlos Díaz) is the students' teacher who guides them through their superhero training, Sparks is the narrator of the episodes and also the mentor of the Sparks' Crew. Like Lucita, Mr. Sparks is of Hispanic descent and fluent in Spanish. He also occasionally drives the Sparks' Crew Van for when the students have missions elsewhere.
- Fur Blur is a hamster who is the class pet and can run very fast. Fur Blur's thoughts are exposed in large clouds with emojis representing her feelings.

=== Other ===
- Heidi (voiced by Denise Oliver)
- Jada (voiced by Barbara Mamabolo)
- Freeze Louise (voiced by Denise Oliver) and Petie Heat (voiced by Cory Doran) are twin siblings who make up "Team Tornado", and possess ice and fire abilities respectively.
- The Amazing Memory Kid (voiced by Stephany Seki) is a student in "The Mighty Brights" class who wears a blue memory helmet. Despite his name, he doesn't have a very good memory.
- "Turbo" Tina (voiced by Ana Sani) is a student in "The Mighty Brights" class who runs really fast.
- "Rubberband" Robbie (voiced by David Berni) is a student in "The Mighty Brights" class who possesses an elastic body.
- Dr. Inventorman (voiced by Martin Roach) is a hero inventor.
- Hail Caesar (voiced by Cory Doran) is a weather-related superhero.
- Athletica (voiced by Kristin Fairlie) is an athletic superheroine that the students idolize.
- Captain Bounceback (voiced by Alexa Hazael) is a superheroine who has the ability to bounce.
- Mrs. Mangia (voiced by Julie Lemieux) is the school's cafeteria supervisor.

== Episodes ==
No.	Title	Written by	Storyboard by	Original release date	Prod. code (Note: Twin Cities PBS files the copyright for the episodes under groups, rather than separate episodes, as seen here: *"Public Catalog". United States Copyright Office.)
1	"Hatching a Plan"	Christine Ferraro	Jeff Bittle	June 1, 2020	101
1	"The Invisible Force"	Jill Cozza-Turner	Tess Reid	June 1, 2020	101
Sparks' Crew vow to reunite a baby bird with its parents. The crew tries to find out why the decorations for a young girl's birthday party have vanished.
2	"Saved from the Bell"	Eric Peterson	Paul Hunt	June 2, 2020	102
2	"The Right Stuff"	Jorge Aguirre	Jeff Bittle	June 2, 2020	102
When the bell on the school's Leaping Tower continually rings, Sparks' crew investigates. The crew decide to restyle their hero suits.
3	"Tail of One Kitty"	Susan Kim	Daniel LaFrance	June 3, 2020	103
3	"Movie Theater Meltdown"	Belinda Arredondo	Jeff Bittle	June 3, 2020	103
The crew learns how animals use their tails when it tries to rescue a little girl's kitten. The team helps a teen with an out-of-control superpower.
4	"The Lake Mistake"	Melinda LaRose	Suren Perera; Meghan Lands	June 4, 2020	104
4	"Plant Problem"	Louie Lazar	Tess Reid	June 4, 2020	104
The Sparks' Crew try to find a way to restore the lake back to its original state after a super student accidentally freezes it. A plant grows out of control.
5	"Where's Fur Blur?"	Geri Cole	Rachel Peters	June 8, 2020	105
5	"The Blob"	Adam Rudman	Tess Reid	June 8, 2020	105
The Sparks' Crew use their five senses to track Fur Blur throughout the school. A giant blob invades the hallways and classrooms, causing chaos.
6	"Toadal Confusion"	Karen Moonah	Jeff White	June 9, 2020	106
6	"Hero Hideaway"	George Arthur Bloom	Glen Kennedy	June 9, 2020	106
Toads take over a new skate park. AJ tries to build a hero clubhouse out of cardboard boxes, but it keeps falling down.
7	"All Over the Map"	Christine Ferraro	Glen Kennedy	June 10, 2020	107
7	"Lights Go Down in Citytown"	James R. Backshall	Venz Vesselinov	June 10, 2020	107
A bird flies off with AJ's Twigcam. The nighttime sky, lit up by the lights of the city, make it hard for Sparks' Crew to see a meteor shower.
8	"Fair Weather"	Patrick Granleese	Jeff White	June 15, 2020	108
8	"Home Sweet Home"	Jorge Aguirre	Rachel Peters	June 15, 2020	108
Sparks' Crew learns about changing weather patterns. The crew tries to find a home for a chipmunk after a tree falls in the schoolyard.
9	"The Feed for Speed"	Eric Peterson	Glen Kennedy	June 16, 2020	109
9	"An Uphill Task"	Karen Moonah	Tess Reid	June 16, 2020	109
Fur Blur competes in the school's Super Pet Races. AJ invents a wheeled robot that can do everything but go up stairs.
10	"With a Little Push"	Adam Rudman	Blayne Burnside	June 17, 2020	110
10	"Track That Pack"	Karen Moonah	James McCrimmon; Tess Reid	June 17, 2020	110
Sparks' Crew chases a giant ball through the city, learning that pushing an object can start or stop its movement. Sparks' Crew searches for AJ's backpack after it floats away in a lake.
11	"The Butterfly Chasers"	Sheila Rogerson	Jeff White	June 22, 2020	111
11	"Something Shady"	Syndi Shumer	Nazish Naqvi	June 22, 2020	111
Benny and the crew investigate why monarch butterflies are missing from the school garden. AJ's shady spot disappears when he and his crew are about to eat lunch outside; so they investigate from where AJ's missing shadow came from.
12	"Turtle Beach"	Patrick Granleese	Glen Kennedy	June 23, 2020	112
12	"Shine a Light on Me"	Bernice Vanderlaan	Jeff White	June 23, 2020	112
When the crew goes to Turtle Beach to see the hatching of baby turtles, they find the beach filled with litter. The crew gathers at night to search for a missing superdog.
13	"Sound of Ice Cream"	Bernice Vanderlaan	Tess Reid	June 29, 2020	113
13	"The Reflection Connection"	Louie Lazar	Glen Kennedy	June 29, 2020	113
An ice cream truck is accidentally made invisible after AJ forgotten his invisible helmet, so the crew must rely on its sounds to find it. People everywhere get stuck when a flying super-glue gadget goes haywire.
14	"Sparks' Crew Unplugged" "Sparks' Unplugged"	Karen Moonah	Jeff Bittle	June 30, 2020	114
14	"Camp Catastrophe"	Jiro C. Okada	Rachel Peters	June 30, 2020	114
Sparks' Crew tries to determine why muffins have gone missing from the school cafeteria. The crew helps a scout troop build a new shelter when their tent blows away.
15	"Monster Hunters"	Karen Moonah	Jeff Bittle	July 1, 2020	115
15	"A Soapy Situation"	Jorge Aguirre	Tess Reid	July 1, 2020	115
When the crew investigates a backyard monster, it discovers that it's actually a mother opossum and her babies. A sudsy mess envelopes the Super-Duper Store.
16	"Bugging Out"	Eric Peterson	Tess Reid	July 6, 2020	116
16	"Eager Beavers"	Sheila Rogerson	Jeff White	July 6, 2020	116
The crew must find their way out of an overgrown, weedy area after being accidentally shrunk to the size of bugs. The crew helps Lucita's grandmother when her favorite scenic spot is flooded.
17	"A Leg Up"	George Arthur Bloom	Glen Kennedy	July 13, 2020	117
17	"Sneezitis Solution"	Patrick Granleese	Jeff White	July 13, 2020	117
A baby porcupine needs help, but the crew has trouble getting close to it. Fur Blur comes down with a hamster cold and the only cure is to sniff the flower of a certain plant.
18	"What You Don't See"	Kate Barris	Rachel Peters	July 20, 2020	118
18	"Super Purple Pop-Up Plants"	Adam Rudman	Tess Reid	July 20, 2020	118
The crew tries to help catch a frightened horse on the loose in Citytown. Mysterious purple plants keep popping up all over Citytown.
19	"Dog in the Fog"	Diana Moore	Glen Kennedy	July 27, 2020	119
19	"Bye, Bye Dragonfly"	Bob Ardiel	Jeff White	July 27, 2020	119
The crew searches for a little dog that gets lost in the fog. The crew uses clues from nature to catch a runaway drone.
20	"Rough Sledding"	Karen Moonah	Tess Reid	August 17, 2020	120
20	"Hungry Hungry Hoppers"	Patrick Granleese	Glen Kennedy	August 17, 2020	120
AJ accidentally ruins a schoolmate's box sled, so the crew helps him find the materials he needs to repair it. The crew takes care of someone else's class pet, a super frog, until it gets out and hops through town (that was after Sara accidentally opens the top to let the frog escape).
21	"Hero Hit Parade"	Eric Peterson	Tess Reid	August 18, 2020	121
21	"Trouble at the Pet Wash"	Jeff Sweeney	Jeff White	August 18, 2020	121
Sparks' Crew tries to retrieve a big parade balloon that gets loose. The crew helps a boy search for his missing dog.
22	"Bouncing Ideas"	Betty Quan	Glen Kennedy	August 19, 2020	122
22	"Leaning Tower, No Pizza"	John Slama	Jeff Bittle	August 19, 2020	122
Sparks' Crew tries to figure out how to stop Rubberband Robbie from bouncing all over the school. The Sparks' Crew tests out low-tech ways to communicate after phone service is knocked out.
23	"Kite Delight"	Patrick Granleese	Jeff White	August 20, 2020	123
23	"Little Lost Horse"	Bob Ardiel	Glen Kennedy	August 20, 2020	123
The crew learns about how wind moves things when they help a boy make a new kite. The crew helps a little girl find her toy horse that she lost on the beach.
24	"The Crew Who SNOWS What to Do"	James R. Backshall	Tess Reid	January 4, 2021	124
24	"Keep Your Eye on the Ball"	Carol-Lynn Parente	Cameron Hood; Drew Ng; James McCrimmon	January 4, 2021	124
Turbo Tina is excited to see her first snowfall, but some of the snow melts quickly. A T-ball championship game is jeopardized when the balls go missing.
25	"Going to Pieces"	Karen Moonah	Jeff Bittle	January 5, 2021	125
25	"Forces of Nature"	Betty Quan	Tess Reid	January 5, 2021	125
When a piece of a statue breaks off, Sparks' Crew must find it before the statue's unveiling ceremony. The crew searches for an invention that Dr. Inventorman buried underground.
26	"Knot So Fast"	Eric Peterson	Jeff White	January 6, 2021	126
26	"Made in the Shade"	Christine Ferraro	Tom Nesbitt	January 6, 2021	126
AJ's shoe-tying car gets out of control, tying all people's shoes, objects, etc. into knots all around Citytown. The crew tries to determine why the ice cream in Stevie Heat's ice cream cart melted.
27	"Snowy Journey"	Jeff Sweeney	Tom Nesbitt	January 7, 2021	127
27	"Super Summertime"	Patrick Granleese	Fancia He	January 7, 2021	127
The crew treks through the snow to get Fur Blur to the veterinarian. AJ wants to do all the activities on his super fun list – but they are for the winter.
28	"Hail Caesar"	Patrick Granleese	Tess Reid	March 29, 2021	128
28	"Picture Perfect"	Carol-Lynn Parente and Maryelizabeth Pfund	Jeff White	March 29, 2021	128
Hail Caesar helps the crew understand more about hail after a hailstorm causes damage around Citytown. The crew tries to stay clean for Picture Day at school.
29	"Monumental Problem"	Jiro C. Okada	Tess Reid	March 30, 2021	129
29	"Super Lift"	Betty Quan	Tom Nesbitt	March 30, 2021	129
The crew must figure out how to repair a monument on Hero Hill. The crew tries to change a broken wheel on a hot dog cart.
30	"Looking Super"	Eric Peterson	Jeff White	March 31, 2021	130
30	"Schmubble Trouble"	Jiro C. Okada	Nathan Maetzener	March 31, 2021	130
Hail Caesar helps the crew search for a self-flying cape that took off from the store. AJ, Lucita, and Sara get caught inside Schmubble Bubbles when Benny catches a bubble cold.
31	"Sara Loses Her Snap"	John Slama	Marko Bajik	April 1, 2021	131
31	"A Soupie Mystery"	Karen Moonah	Tom Nesbitt	April 1, 2021	131
Sara loses her super strength on the same day the crew has to move a giant, heavy burger. The crew sets out to find Soupy, a mysterious creature that has been spotted in Super Superior Lake.
32	"AJ's Extra Superpower"	Christine Ferraro	Nathan Maetzener and Tess Reid	April 2, 2021	132
The crew discovers that a dog is stealing a little girl's toys from her backyard, and AJ tries to find his hero, Jetman Jones, at Citytown Hero Con after he gave him the wrong envelope.
33	"Search and Rescue"	Patrick Granleese	Jeff White	May 3, 2021	133
33	"Secret Lives of Teachers"	Adam Rudman	Tom Nesbitt	May 3, 2021	133
Sparks' Crew searches for two schoolmates who are hiding somewhere in Citytown. The kids are surprised to see their teacher on the weekend outside of school.
34	"Heroes in Space"	Karen Moonah	Tess Reid and Nathan Maetzener	July 12, 2021	134
Sara and friends are excited to view the full moon, but they notice that half of the moon is missing. The crew flies to the moon to investigate.
35	"Back on Track"	Eric Peterson	Tess Reid	July 13, 2021	135
35	"Switcheroo-er"	Christine Ferraro	Marko Bajik	July 13, 2021	135
When a toy train is ruined, the crew sets out to learn more about the landforms that make up City Town so they can build a replica. AJ's new gadget switches everyone's powers.
36	"Squeak to Me"	Bernice Vanderlaan	Jeff White	July 14, 2021	136
36	"Team Song's Theme Song"	Christine Ferraro	Marko Bajik	July 14, 2021	136
AJ builds a gadget to help people understand Fur Blur's squeaks, but it misfires and makes people squeak. Sparks' Crew wants a theme song.
37	"First Day of School"	Eric Peterson	Tom Nesbitt and Jeff White	September 6, 2021	137
This origin episode tells how Sparks' crew met at their first day at Hero Elementary and went on its first mission to catch a baby hamster.
38	"When Fur Flies"	Christine Ferraro	Nathan Maetzener	October 11, 2021	138
38	"Pumpkin Palooza"	Christine Ferraro	Jeff White	October 11, 2021	138
Something high in the sky is causing a trail of trouble across Citytown, but is it a bird, a plane, or something else? Sparks' Crew observes the properties of things gone wrong downtown, which leads them to understand what the problem is. It's the day of Pumpkin Palooza and a little girl's decorated pumpkin has been ruined. It's Sparks' Crew to the rescue! Learning that the culprit is a hungry squirrel, they work together to design and build a solution to protect all the decorated pumpkins in Citytown.
39	"Friends of the Forest"	Christine Ferraro	Tom Nesbitt	January 3, 2022	139
39	"Chicken Hero"	Eric Peterson	Jeff White	January 3, 2022	139
The heroes embark on a mission with Branchman to plan a solution to use less paper. The crew tries to track down a chicken on the loose.
40	"Teacher of the Year"	Christine Ferraro	Tess Reid	January 4, 2022	140
40	"The Sweet Smell of Success"	Eric Peterson	Nathan Maetzener	January 4, 2022	140
There's a big surprise in store for Mr. Sparks: he will be receiving the "Hero Teacher of the Year" award! His heroic students want to make everything special for the big celebration, and that includes making a cake. But, will Sparks' Crew be able to keep the party a surprise while they figure out the right mixture for the cake batter? Invisigirl (a former student) likes to use her invisibility to play jokes, but a joke has unintended consequences when she makes a cake invisible, and then can't find it! The team tries to track it down via their sense of smell, but will it be enough to find the cake?

== Broadcast ==
The series first premiered on PBS Kids in the United States on June 1, 2020, then it premiered on TVOKids and Knowledge Network in Canada on July 7, 2020, reruns of the series entered off-network syndication on September 12, 2022 and premiered on Discovery Kids in Latin America and IRIB TV2 Persian in 2022.

== Reception ==
Polly Conway of Common Sense Media said "helpful friends use skills and science to solve problems".
