= Ernest Anderson (Minnesota politician) =

American politician (1902–1992)

Member of the Minnesota Senate
- In office 1955–1972

Personal details
- Born: Ernest Noral Jerome Anderson; November 28, 1902 Frost, Minnesota, U.S.
- Died: January 27, 1992 (aged 89) Blue Earth, Minnesota, U.S.
- Party: Republican

Ernest Noral Jerome Anderson (November 28, 1902 – January 27, 1992) was an American farmer and politician.

== Early life ==
Anderson was born on a farm in Frost, Minnesota. He graduated from Bricelyn High School in Bricelyn, Minnesota.

== Career ==
Anderson lived with his wife and family, in Frost, Minnesota, and was a farmer. Anderson served on the Frost, Minnesota School Board and was president of the school board. He served in the Minnesota Senate from 1955 to 1972 and was a Republican.

== Personal life ==
Anderson died at St. Luke's Lutheran Home in Blue Earth, Minnesota. His funeral and burial was in Frost, Minnesota.
