= Skillsville =

American–Canadian animated television series

- Genre: Science fiction comedy Action; Adventure; Satire
- Created by: Christine Ferraro; Carol-Lynn Parente; Eric Peterson
- Directed by: Chris Fazio
- Creative director: Eric Peterson
- Voices of: Jessy Yates; Nissae Isen; Elishia Perosa; Jamie Watson; Cory Doran; Morrissa Nicole; Ragini Kapil; Scott Gorman; Katie Griffin; Dwain Murphy
- Countries of origin: United States; Canada
- Original language: English
- No. of episodes: 30

Production
- Executive producers: Carol-Lynn Parente; Christine Ferraro; Eric Peterson; Momo Hayakawa
- Production companies: Twin Cities PBS; Sphere Animation

Original release
- Network: PBS Kids
- Release: March 3, 2025 – April 19, 2026

Skillsville is an animated children's television series that premiered on March 3, 2025, on PBS Kids with funding from the United States Department of Education. The series is produced by Twin Cities PBS (TPT) and Sphere Media.

The show is set in a gaming environment and is designed to help children develop executive function skills and learn about careers.

== Premise ==
The series centers around a racially-diverse trio of children: Cora, Dev and Rae, who have everyday thoughts and ideas about future careers. Realizing that they can experience those in Skillsville, an open-world video game developed by Cora's mother, they touch a truncated octahedron-shaped game projector and say "Launch Skillsville" to prompt it to transport them into the game, where they take on their in-game personas (ParCora, Devosaurus, and Racer Rae) and try to work in various occupations to provide services for characters called Beeples, often with help from an anthropomorphic lavender pupperfly (dog-dragonfly hybrid) named Scout. When the children have a problem, they pause to give themselves time to come up with a solution, then unpause to implement it. At the end of every episode, they say goodbye to Scout (who responds with "Later, gamers!") and leave the game.

== Characters ==
=== Main ===
- Cora (also known as ParCora, voiced by Nissae Isen) is an African-American girl who wears a visor and a cyan vest when she plays Skillsville with Rae and Dev. She also wields a staff.
- Rae (also known as Racer Rae, voiced by Jessy Yates) is a disabled white girl who uses a wheelchair.
- Dev (also known as Devosaurus, voiced by Elishia Perosa) is an Indian boy who dons a virtual dinosaur costume when he plays Skillsville with Rae and Cora.
- Scout (voiced by Cory Doran) is a character in the Skillsville game who guides Rae, Cora, and Dev through their adventures. He is an anthropomorphic lavender pupperfly, a fictional species that resembles a dog with the wings and antennae of a dragonfly.

=== Recurring ===
- Camille (also known as Mrs. Walker and Camille-4-Real, voiced by Morissa Nicole) is Cora's mother. She works as a Skillsville operator, having created the game herself.
- Beeples (voiced by Cory Doran) are the NPC residents of Skillsville.
- Evan and Annie (voiced by Scott Gorman and Katie Griffin) are Rae's parents.
- Nani (also known as NaniRani, voiced by Ragini Kapil) is Dev's grandmother.
- Cedric Walker (voiced by Dwain Murphy) is Cora's father.

Additionally, there is an unnamed announcer (voiced by Jamie Watson) who announces when missions are assigned and completed. Their main appearance is through a set of soundbars.

== Episodes ==
All episodes are designated as Season 1.

No.	Title	Written by	Original release date	Prod. code	U.S. viewers (millions)
1	"Chef"	Christine Ferraro	March 3, 2025	101	N/A
1	"Air Traffic Controller"	Eric Peterson	March 3, 2025	101	N/A
As a chef, Cora has to think differently about the ingredients she uses in the food she is preparing for the Beeples. / Dev takes on the job of an air traffic controller at the Paper Plane Airport where he is faced with distractions.
2	"Train Engineer"	Christine Ferraro	March 4, 2025	102	N/A
2	"Paleontologist"	Shelia Rogerson	March 4, 2025	102	N/A
As a train engineer, Rae tries to remember which buttons to push to make the train move to get the Beeples to Marshmallow Mountain Station. / As a paleontologist, Dev needs to stay organized at the dig site to find all the dinosaur bones.
3	"Farmer"	Karen Moonah	March 5, 2025	103	N/A
3	"Mail Carrier"	Basho Masko	March 5, 2025	103	N/A
As a farmer, Dev needs to get organized by asking the Beeples questions about harvesting crops. / As a mail carrier, Rae needs to get organized to deliver mail to the Beeples in time to complete the game challenge.
4	"Game Tester"	Rahul Chaturvedi	March 6, 2025	104	N/A
4	"Interior Designer"	Eric Tate	March 6, 2025	104	N/A
The kids offer to help Cora's mom by becoming game testers and figuring out how to remember all of the bugs in the game. / Rae has to listen to what the Beeples want as she takes on the role of an interior designer.
5	"Sound Effects Artist"	Karen Moonah	March 7, 2025	105	N/A
5	"City Planner"	Eric Peterson	March 7, 2025	105	N/A
As a sound effects artist, Dev learns that he will need to think differently to figure out how to make all the sounds he needs for a movie. / Cora becomes a city planner to create a new area of Skillsville for everyone to enjoy.
6	"Laundromat Manager"	Mary Jacobson	March 10, 2025	106	N/A
6	"Inventor"	Anna Thorup	March 10, 2025	106	N/A
Dev needs to stay organized as a laundromat manager to get the Beeples' team jerseys clean for the big game. / As an inventor, Rae comes up with an easier way for the Beeples to get to the top of Mount Froyo so they can go sledding all day long.
7	"Firefighter"	Eric Peterson	March 11, 2025	107	N/A
7	"Bank Teller"	Julian Incoom	March 11, 2025	107	N/A
As a firefighter, Rae uses a strategy to remain calm as she helps save the farm with Dev, Cora, and Scout. / As a bank teller, Cora needs to stay focused when helping the Beeples with depositing and withdrawing from their accounts.
8	"Race Car Driver"	Alyson Piekarsky	March 12, 2025	108	N/A
8	"Crane Operator"	Karen Moonah	March 12, 2025	108	N/A
Race car driver Rae looks to stay focused to win the race, with the help of Scout, Dev, and Cora as members of her pit crew. / Crane operator Dev uses a strategy to feel calm so he can organize deliveries at the Skillsville warehouse.
9	"Coach"	Roxana Altamirano	March 13, 2025	109	N/A
9	"Salesperson"	Saira Umar	March 13, 2025	109	N/A
As a coach, Cora helps the Beeples train for a track and field competition in Skillsville. / As a toy store salesperson, Dev finds a way to feel calm so he can help the Beeples find the toys that they want.
10	"Entrepreneur"	Shelia Rogerson	March 14, 2025	110	N/A
10	"Hairstylist"	Shelia Rogerson	March 14, 2025	110	N/A
Cora opens a lemonade stand and makes a plan with Dev and Rae to grow her business. / As a hairstylist, Rae focuses on giving her customers the haircuts and colors they want.
11	"Teacher"	Mary Jacobson	July 28, 2025	111	N/A
11	"Allergist"	Brianna Ishibashi	July 28, 2025	111	N/A
Dev teaches a class of Beeples about dinosaurs, but not all of the students seem interested. / As an allergist, Cora investigates why the Beeples have a case of the squeakies.
12	"Civil Engineer"	Patrick Granleese	July 29, 2025	112	N/A
12	"Drone Operator"	Eric Tate	July 29, 2025	112	N/A
As a civil engineer, Dev needs to build a bridge in Skillsville to get the Beeples across the river. / Dev, Cora and Rae work together to make pizza deliveries as drone operators.
13	"Hotel Manager"	Melinda LaRose	July 30, 2025	113	N/A
13	"Robotics Technician"	Dilpreet Kaur Walia	July 30, 2025	113	N/A
Rae learns the importance of organizing tasks as a hotel manager at the Skillsville Hotel. / As a robotics technician, Dev must troubleshoot a malfunctioning construction robot.
14	"Choreographer"	Maryelizabeth Pfund	July 31, 2025	114	N/A
14	"Plumber"	Basho Mosko	July 31, 2025	114	N/A
Rae takes on the role of a choreographer, teaching her friends a dance routine for an upcoming Beeples concert. / When the fountain in the middle of Skillsville dries up, Cora takes the job of a plumber to restore water flow.
15	"Photographer"	Adam Rudman	August 1, 2025	115	N/A
15	"Librarian"	Marisa Evans-Sanden	August 1, 2025	115	N/A
Rae takes on the job of photographer, learning to focus to capture perfect shots of a stunt motorcycle rider. / Librarian Dev discovers that grouping is a helpful strategy to keep books organized.
16	"Dental Hygienist"	Christine Ferraro	December 9, 2025	116	N/A
16	"Flavorist"	Eric Peterson	December 9, 2025	116	N/A
Cora cleans the Beeples' teeth at the dentist's office, but finds it challenging to get them to cooperate. / As a flavorist, Rae needs to come up with the next best flavor of Beepy Bites Snacks.
17	"Occupational Therapist"	Christine Ferraro	December 10, 2025	117	N/A
17	"Meteorologist"	Eric Peterson	December 10, 2025	117	N/A
Occupational therapist Rae needs to think differently when she shows an injured Beeple how to use a wheelchair. / Meteorologist Dev helps predict the weather by using his focus skills.
18	"Astronaut"	Roxana Altamirano	December 11, 2025	118	N/A
18	"Music Conductor"	Brianna Ishibashi	December 11, 2025	118	N/A
Astronaut Cora has a great strategy to help stay organized while fixing a satellite in space. / Music conductor Rae learns to stay calm and on tempo whilst conducting the Skillsville band.
19	"Volcanologist"	Patrick Granleese	March 19, 2026	119	N/A
19	"Detective"	Alyson Piekarsky	March 19, 2026	119	N/A
As a volcanologist, Dev learns to remember and track the warning signs that signal an upcoming volcanic eruption. / Detective Cora asks questions and follows the clues to solve a puzzling Skillsville mystery.
20	"Chemist"	Christine Ferraro	March 20, 2026	120	N/A
20	"Lighting Designer"	Eric Peterson	March 20, 2026	120	N/A
As chemists, Cora, Dev, and Rae get organized and experiment with mixtures to create the right reactions and save the day. / While preparing for Diwali, Dev's Nani shares her lifelong dream of becoming a lighting designer—and the kids invite her into the game to design dazzling lights for Skillsville's Glowfest.
21	"Fashion Designer"	Anna Thorup	April 10, 2026	121	N/A
21	"Veterinarian"	Mary Jacobson	April 10, 2026	121	N/A
With a little planning, fashion designer Rae learns how to make her creations both fashionable and functional. / As a veterinarian, Dev uses the process of elimination to diagnose and help his animal patients feel better.
22	"Park Ranger"	Adam Rudman	April 11, 2026	122	N/A
22	"Career Counselor"	Karen Moonah	April 11, 2026	122	N/A
Whilst taking on the role of a park ranger, Dev loses his trail map and must remember the correct path to safely guide a team of scouts to a hidden waterfall. / Cora takes on the role of Scout's career counselor and struggles to find the perfect job for him—until she discovers that a positive pep talk helps her keep trying.
23	"Renewable Energy Technician"	Melinda LaRose	April 12, 2026	123	N/A
23	"Real Estate Agent"	Christine Ferraro	April 12, 2026	123	N/A
As a renewable energy technician, Cora teams up with the kids to install solar panels and windmills to power Skillsville's buildings. / Cora and Rae face off as real estate agents, competing to find the perfect treehouse for their buyers.
24	"Cryptologist"	Eric Peterson	April 13, 2026	124	N/A
24	"Landscape Designer"	Sara Farber	April 13, 2026	124	N/A
Cryptologist Cora takes her time and thinks carefully to decode a secret message hidden in the game. / Landscape designer Dev creates a plan to make a yard both beautiful and functional by choosing the best plants for each space.
25	"Nutritionist"	Karen Moonah	April 14, 2026	125	N/A
25	"Judge"	Eric Tate	April 14, 2026	125	N/A
Playing the role of a nutritionist, Rae helps the players choose foods that give them the best "power-up." / As a judge, Cora must listen carefully and make fair decisions to help resolve a disagreement between friends.
26	"Demolition Expert"	Basho Masko	April 15, 2026	126	N/A
26	"Florist"	Marisa Evans-Sanden	April 15, 2026	126	N/A
As a demolition expert, Dev needs to find a way to take down a crumbling cookie factory safely. / Rae's challenge as a florist is remembering who ordered which flower arrangement—and delivering them to the right place.
27	"Building Inspector"	Karen Moonah	April 16, 2026	127	N/A
27	"Museum Conservator"	Stacey Greenberger	April 16, 2026	127	N/A
Rae becomes a building inspector, checking every detail to make sure Skillsville's new art museum is safe for visitors. / As a museum conservator, Dev must stay focused to clean, restore and display a delicate artifact.
28	"Athlete"	Katherine Beattie & Christine Ferraro	April 17, 2026	128	N/A
28	"Party Planner"	Karen Moonah	April 17, 2026	128	N/A
As an athlete in the Skillsville Games, Rae learns how to manage her emotions to stay focused and score. / Rae, Cora, and Dev work together as party planners, sticking to a budget while throwing a fun surprise party for Kid Beeple.
29	"Recycling Worker"	Eric Peterson	April 18, 2026	129	N/A
29	"Campaign Manager"	Christine Ferraro	April 18, 2026	129	N/A
As a recycling worker, Dev enjoys driving a cool truck—but discovers that sorting recyclables takes careful attention. / Cora and Dev go head-to-head as campaign managers, each finding creative ways to share their candidate's message in the race for Skillsville mayor.
30	"Video Game Designer"	Eric Peterson	April 19, 2026	130	N/A
Cora steps into the role of a video game designer—just like her mom—and learns that the key to a great game is making it challenging enough to keep players engaged and having fun.

== Broadcast ==
The series premiered on March 3, 2025, on PBS Kids. After airing 18 episodes, PBS dropped the series on January 31, 2026. Beginning February 1, 2026, American Public Television began national distribution to local public television stations, and episodes were released on YouTube.

== Cancellation ==
Two months following the broadcast premiere, production was abruptly halted in May 2025 due to the termination of the Ready To Learn grant, which had been providing major financial support (upwards of $4.6 million) for the development of the series since 2020. After the release of the first 10 episodes, Skillsville project director, Momoko Hayakawa, indicated 20 episodes were still in production and nearing completion when the TPT staff was furloughed. 8 of the episodes were subsequently completed during the original PBS Kids run and broadcast on the PBS Kids channel in the summer and winter of that year; the last 12 were presented on local PBS and other public TV stations through American Public Television in 2026, with their broadcast premieres on KLCS's kids subchannel.

== Multimedia programs ==
In addition to the television series, the Skillsville "Innovation Program" includes summer camps and "pop up events" for community engagement with children and their families. These hands-on activities focus on the same life skills and career exploration topics from the show with the goal of helping children succeed in their future careers.

=== Games ===
As part of the fully immersive program, four Skillsville games were planned to be released on the PBS Kids website, as well as the PBS Kids Games app.

== Reception ==
=== Awards ===
Skillsville won a Bronze Telly Award in Children's Television for its "Air Traffic Controller" episode.
