= Kabetogama Township, St. Louis County, Minnesota =

Kabetogama Township, Minnesota
- Township
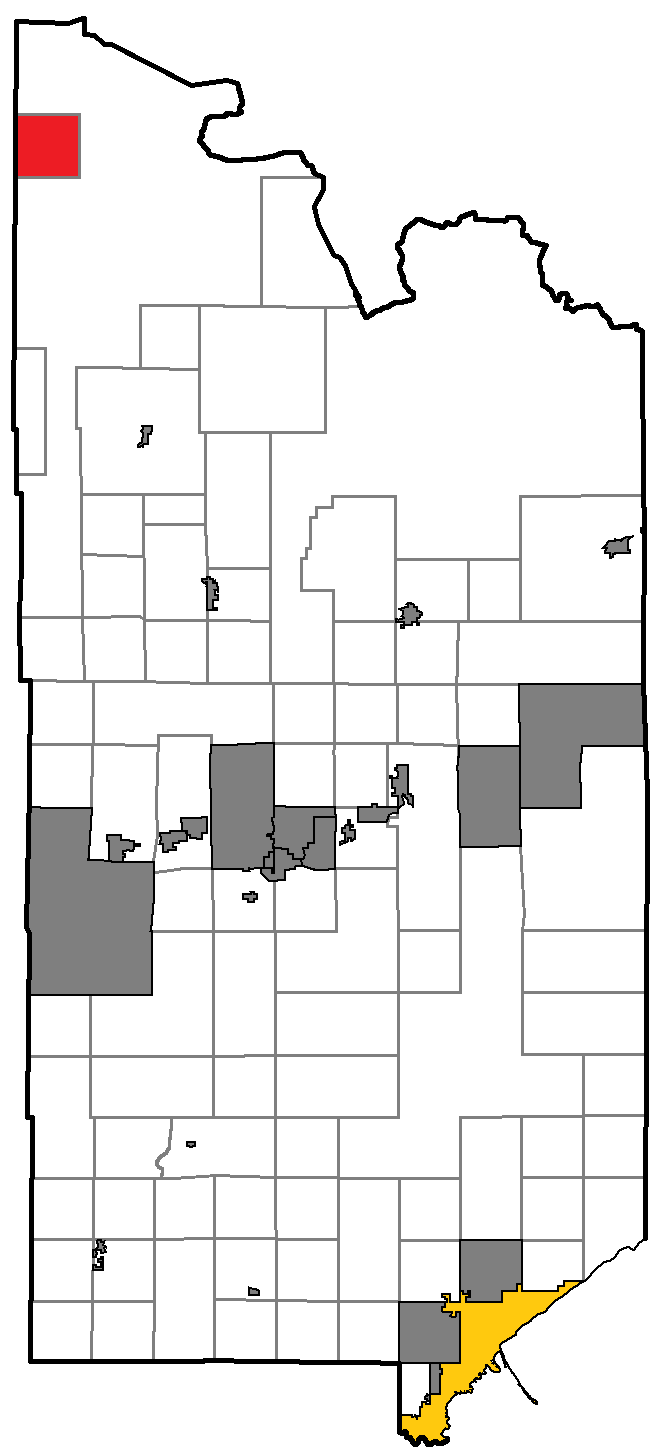
- Location of Kabetogama Township within St. Louis County, Minnesota
- Coordinates: 48°27′25″N 93°01′50″W
- Country: United States
- State: Minnesota
- County: Saint Louis

Area
  - Total: 33.2 sq mi (86.0 km^{2})
  - Land: 16.1 sq mi (41.6 km^{2})
  - Water: 17.1 sq mi (44.4 km^{2})
- Elevation: 1,112 ft (339 m)

Population (2020)
  - Total: 140
  - Density: 8.7/sq mi (3.4/km^{2})
- Time zone: UTC-6 (Central (CST))
  - Summer (DST): UTC-5 (CDT)
- GNIS feature ID: 2397817
- Website: https://www.kabtownship.com/

Kabetogama Township (/ˌkæbəˈtoʊɡəmə/ KAB-ə-TOH-gə-mə) is a township in Saint Louis County, Minnesota, United States. The population was 140 at the 2020 census. A portion of the township is located within the Kabetogama State Forest.

Saint Louis County Roads 122 and 123 are two of the main routes in the township. U.S. Highway 53 is nearby. Voyageurs National Park is in the vicinity. Kabetogama Township is located along part of Kabetogama Lake.

The unincorporated community of Kabetogama is located within Kabetogama Township.

== Geography ==
According to the United States Census Bureau, the unorganized territory has a total area of 33.2 square miles (86 km^{2}); 16.1 square miles (42 km^{2}) is land and 17.1 square miles (44 km^{2}), or 51.60%, is water.

Kabetogama Township is the farthest north organized township in Saint Louis County.

The unincorporated community of Kabetogama, within Kabetogama Township, is located 27 miles southeast of International Falls; and 49 miles north of Cook.

=== Climate ===
Climate data for Kabetogama Township, St. Louis County, Minnesota, 1991–2020 normals, extremes 1997–present
Month	Jan	Feb	Mar	Apr	May	Jun	Jul	Aug	Sep	Oct	Nov	Dec	Year
Record high °F (°C)	47 (8)	58 (14)	78 (26)	83 (28)	91 (33)	98 (37)	95 (35)	95 (35)	91 (33)	88 (31)	72 (22)	47 (8)	98 (37)
Mean maximum °F (°C)	38.3 (3.5)	41.5 (5.3)	57.7 (14.3)	69.8 (21.0)	83.2 (28.4)	85.1 (29.5)	89.5 (31.9)	87.7 (30.9)	83.6 (28.7)	74.1 (23.4)	55.9 (13.3)	40.5 (4.7)	90.8 (32.7)
Mean daily maximum °F (°C)	15.7 (−9.1)	21.2 (−6.0)	34.9 (1.6)	49.3 (9.6)	63.6 (17.6)	73.3 (22.9)	77.5 (25.3)	75.9 (24.4)	66.4 (19.1)	51.1 (10.6)	34.1 (1.2)	20.8 (−6.2)	48.7 (9.3)
Daily mean °F (°C)	3.9 (−15.6)	7.9 (−13.4)	22.3 (−5.4)	36.3 (2.4)	50.1 (10.1)	60.5 (15.8)	64.7 (18.2)	62.6 (17.0)	54.1 (12.3)	41.0 (5.0)	25.7 (−3.5)	11.6 (−11.3)	36.7 (2.6)
Mean daily minimum °F (°C)	−7.8 (−22.1)	−5.4 (−20.8)	9.7 (−12.4)	23.3 (−4.8)	36.6 (2.6)	47.7 (8.7)	51.8 (11.0)	49.3 (9.6)	41.8 (5.4)	30.9 (−0.6)	17.3 (−8.2)	2.4 (−16.4)	24.8 (−4.0)
Mean minimum °F (°C)	−33.2 (−36.2)	−31.0 (−35.0)	−17.9 (−27.7)	7.7 (−13.5)	24.3 (−4.3)	33.0 (0.6)	41.1 (5.1)	37.5 (3.1)	28.5 (−1.9)	18.7 (−7.4)	−3.4 (−19.7)	−22.9 (−30.5)	−36.1 (−37.8)
Record low °F (°C)	−50 (−46)	−50 (−46)	−33 (−36)	−6 (−21)	19 (−7)	28 (−2)	36 (2)	30 (−1)	22 (−6)	9 (−13)	−21 (−29)	−40 (−40)	−50 (−46)
Average precipitation inches (mm)	1.05 (27)	0.72 (18)	0.97 (25)	1.77 (45)	3.26 (83)	4.65 (118)	4.22 (107)	3.05 (77)	4.07 (103)	2.33 (59)	1.79 (45)	1.11 (28)	28.99 (735)
Average snowfall inches (cm)	14.9 (38)	14.5 (37)	10.2 (26)	7.1 (18)	0.1 (0.25)	0.0 (0.0)	0.0 (0.0)	0.0 (0.0)	0.0 (0.0)	1.1 (2.8)	12.1 (31)	18.4 (47)	78.4 (200.05)
Average precipitation days (≥ 0.01 in)	8.0	7.0	5.7	6.7	11.8	13.0	11.5	10.0	12.0	10.6	8.0	8.8	113.1
Average snowy days (≥ 0.1 in)	7.1	6.4	3.9	2.4	0.1	0.0	0.0	0.0	0.0	0.7	5.3	9.3	35.2
Source 1: NOAA
Source 2: National Weather Service (mean maxima/minima, snow/snow days 2006–2020)

== Notes ==
Kabetogama Township is located along part of Kabetogama Lake. The lake is one of four major lakes that make up the Voyageurs National Park. The unincorporated community of Kabetogama is the gateway into the park.

Kabetogama Lake has 25,000 acres (100 km^{2}) of waters and has 200 islands. Kabetogama is noted for walleye fishing. There are also northern pike, crappie, perch, and bass.

Kabetogama is a Chippewa name that means 'rough waters'. The lake lives up to its name when it is windy.

The Kabetogama area is also known for hunting of whitetail deer, black bear, and small game birds.

== Demographics ==
At the 2000 census there were 156 people, 72 households, and 50 families living in the unorganized territory. The population density was 9.7 people per square mile (3.8/km^{2}). There were 221 housing units at an average density of 13.8/sq mi (5.3/km^{2}). The racial makeup of the unorganized territory was 99.36% White and 0.64% Native American. Of the 72 households 19.4% had children under the age of 18 living with them, 66.7% were married couples living together, and 29.2% were non-families. 23.6% of households were one person and 8.3% were one person aged 65 or older. The average household size was 2.17 and the average family size was 2.55.

The age distribution was 17.3% under the age of 18, 3.2% from 18 to 24, 16.7% from 25 to 44, 40.4% from 45 to 64, and 22.4% 65 or older. The median age was 52 years. For every 100 females, there were 95.0 males. For every 100 females age 18 and over, there were 101.6 males.

The median household income was $42,000 and the median family income was $50,938. Males had a median income of $32,083 versus $6,250 for females. The per capita income for the unorganized territory was $32,176. None of the population or families were below the poverty line.

== Media ==
The official newspaper of Kabetogama is the Timberjay. The Timberjay is published weekly, with a circulation of over 1000.
