= KWCM-TV =

Television station in Appleton, Minnesota

KWCM-TV and KSMN

KWCM-TV: Appleton, Minnesota; KSMN: Worthington, Minnesota; United States
- Channels for KWCM-TV: Digital: 10 (VHF); Virtual: 10
- Channels for KSMN: Digital: 15 (UHF); Virtual: 20
- Branding: Pioneer PBS

Programming
- Affiliations: 10.1/20.1: PBS; for others, see § Subchannels

Ownership
- Owner: West Central Minnesota Educational TV Corp.

History
- First air date: KWCM-TV: January 21, 1966; KSMN: February 3, 1997
- Former call signs: KSMN: KMSW (CP, November 20, 1995–December 8, 1995)
- Former channel number: KWCM-TV: Analog: 10 (VHF, 1966–2009); Digital: 31 (UHF, 2009); KSMN: Analog: 20 (UHF, 1997–2009)
- Former affiliations: KWCM-TV: NET (via KTCA, 1966–1970)
- Call sign meaning: KWCM-TV: West Central Minnesota; KSMN: Southwestern Minnesota

Technical information
- Licensing authority: FCC
- Facility ID: KWCM-TV: 71549; KSMN: 71558
- ERP: KWCM-TV: 50 kW; KSMN: 200 kW
- HAAT: KWCM-TV: 381 m (1,250 ft); KSMN: 290.1 m (952 ft)
- Transmitter coordinates: KWCM-TV: 45°10′3″N 96°0′2″W; KSMN: 43°53′52″N 95°56′51″W
- Translator: see § Translators

Links
- Public license information: KWCM-TV: Public file; LMS; KSMN: Public file; LMS
- Website: www.pioneer.org

KWCM-TV (channel 10) in Appleton, Minnesota, and KSMN (channel 20) in Worthington, Minnesota, are PBS member television stations owned by the West Central Minnesota Educational TV Corp. The stations maintain studios on Pioneer Drive in Granite Falls. KWCM-TV's transmitter is located near Appleton, while KSMN's tower is near Chandler, Minnesota.

KSMN operates as a full-time satellite of KWCM-TV; its existence is only acknowledged in station identifications. Aside from the transmitter, KSMN does not maintain any physical presence locally in Worthington.

The two stations are collectively branded as Pioneer PBS. Their combined signal can also be received in parts of Iowa, South Dakota and North Dakota. Several other translators carry the signal into other communities.

== History ==
Logo used from 2012 until November 3, 2019

KWCM went on the air for the first time on February 7, 1966. In the early years, it repeated the signal of KTCA-TV in the Twin Cities. It adopted the Pioneer Public Television name in 1982, and added KSMN in 1997.

The station is available on the DirecTV and Dish Network feeds for the Twin Cities and Sioux Falls markets. Appleton is part of the Twin Cities market, while Worthington is in the Sioux Falls market. This gives Pioneer a potential audience of 4.8 million people in Minnesota, Iowa, South Dakota, North Dakota and Wisconsin. As of November 3, 2019, the station became Pioneer PBS due to PBS' overhaul.

== Pioneer-produced shows ==
Some locally produced shows include Postcards, Prairie Sportsman, Funtime Polka, Your Legislators, Country Spires and programs produced with the University of Minnesota Morris, Prairie Yard and Garden, Academic Challenge, Echoes of Cry of the Marsh and Minnesota Rivers and Fields. Some of these shows have also been shown on the Minnesota Channel, a statewide network originated at KTCI-TV in the Twin Cities which carries local programs on Saturday and Sunday evenings.

== Technical information ==
=== Subchannels ===
The stations' signals are multiplexed:

Subchannels of KWCM-TV and KSMN
Channel			Res.	Short name		Programming
KWCM-TV	KSMN	K08QE-D	Res.	KWCM-TV	KSMN	Programming
10.1	20.1	8.1	720p	KWCM-HD	KSMN-HD	PBS
10.2	20.2	8.2	480i	KWCM-CR	KSMN-CR	Create
10.3	20.3	8.3	480i	KWCM-MN	KSMN-MN	Minnesota Channel
10.4	20.4	8.4	480i	KWCM-WD	KSMN-WD	World
10.5	20.5	8.5	480i	KWCM-KD	KSMN-KD	PBS Kids
10.6	20.6	8.6	480i	KWCMFNX	KSMNFNX	First Nations Experience

=== Analog-to-digital conversion ===
KWCM-TV and KSMN shut down their analog transmitters on June 12, 2009. KWCM-TV's digital signal relocated to VHF channel 10 from UHF channel 31, while KSMN's digital signal remained on its pre-transition UHF channel 15.

=== Translators ===
A network of digital translators in western Minnesota translates KWCM.

City of license	Callsign	Channel	ERP	HAAT	Facility ID	Transmitter coordinates	Owner
Alexandria	K27KN-D	27	1.1 kW	123 m (404 ft)	59645	45°55′59.0″N 95°26′51.0″W	Selective TV
Fergus Falls	K08QE-D	8	3 kW	202 m (663 ft)	71562	46°28′48.0″N 96°01′46.0″W	West Central Minnesota Educational TV Corporation
Olivia	K20JY-D	20	0.79 kW	87 m (285 ft)	55749	44°45′32.9″N 94°52′24.0″W	Renville County TV Corporation
Willmar	K22ND-D	22	0.7 kW	155 m (509 ft)	68708	45°09′58.0″N 95°02′38.0″W	UHF TV, Inc.
