= Subsidiary communications authority =

Subcarrier on an FM radio station

Subsidiary Communications Authorization (SCA) in the United States, and Subsidiary Communications Multiplex Operation (SCMO) in Canada, is a subcarrier on a radio station, allowing the station to broadcast additional services as part of its signal.

== Background ==
Subsidiary Communications Authorization is the United States Federal Communications Commission's official designation for this type of service. SCA was deregulated in 1983; since then, both AM and FM licensed broadcast stations have been allowed to use subcarriers in the United States in general without requiring separate authority; authorization is only required for some uses which are still otherwise regulated, such as common carrier or Land Mobile Radio Service transmissions. The fidelity (bandwidth) of SCA channels on FM is generally quite limited compared to that of the main program material, resulting in audio quality similar to AM radio broadcasting. By extension, the already limited bandwidth of AM means that it is impossible to multiplex any secondary audio service on an AM signal; any SCA usage would be limited to text.

The Canadian Radio-television and Telecommunications Commission (CRTC) calls this service Subsidiary Communications Multiplex Operation (SCMO). SCMO for internal uses by the radio station, such as internal monitoring and cue control, are allowed under the normal broadcasting certificate. Non-broadcasting uses are allowed when the type of use is authorized under other radio and telecommunications acts, and may require a fee.

In Australia, the service is called Ancillary Communications Service (ACS) and the Radio Data System is specifically addressed by government guidelines.

Subcarrier channels falling under the description of SCA are usually on FM at 67 kHz and 92 kHz from the main carrier, and 67 kHz is the most common. Major uses of SCA include:

- For talking book/radio reading service for the blind: usually carried on NPR-affiliated public radio stations in the United States. In Canada, this is usually provided by AMI-audio over television second audio programs instead.
- As a transmitter/studio link, sending telemetry data from a broadcast FM station's transmitter to the studio for monitoring the condition of the transmitter
- For commercial paging service: sent via FM subcarrier to the subscriber with a compatible pager
- For data broadcasting: Microsoft's now-defunct DirectBand service (used by MSN Direct) relied on SCA FM subcarriers; Data Broadcasting Corporation's Signal service used SCA for sending real-time stock quotes.
- For closed-circuit or specialized radio programming aimed at certain markets or professions, such as the Physician's Radio Network, agricultural commodity & futures information (via voice or data), or ethnic foreign-language radio programming. (In 1966, the license for WCLM in Chicago was revoked, and one allegation was that it had used its SCA to transmit horserace information to bookies engaged in illegal betting operations.)
- For the transmission of Muzak's background music service to its subscribers (i.e., supermarkets, restaurants, etc.), this transmission method (along with another method using leased phone lines) have been phased out with Muzak now transmitting its programming via satellite.

Venture Technologies, which owns a large number of analog low-power television stations with audio subcarriers that operate as FM radio stations, proposed using SCA rules to continue transmitting those analog audio services along an ATSC 3.0 signal.

== Receiving the SCA signal ==
Most programming transmitted by SCA/SCMO is usually pay/subscription-based, making unauthorized reception of such programming illegal, but programming which is not commercial in nature, such as reading services, can be received legally.

Companies in the past such as Norver, ComPol, Mani National Corporation, McMartin, & Dayton Industrial; and current companies such as Metrosonix make radios and adapters for receiving SCA/SCMO channels. It can be difficult to keep the main channel's FM stereo difference subcarrier from interfering with such SCA decoders, as the stereo signal is a much stronger signal, and distortions due to multipath can also cause problems.

== See also ==
- Bruce Elving, author and advocate of SCA broadcasting
- Radio Data System – widespread program information standard; sometimes considered a type of SCA
- Second audio program (SAP) – a similar service on television signals
- FMeXtra – a digital audio implementation of SCA
