= Kabetogama, Minnesota =

Kabetogama
- Unincorporated community
- Location within Minnesota Location within the United States
- Coordinates: 48°26′16″N 93°01′39″W
- Country: United States
- State: Minnesota
- County: Saint Louis
- Township: Kabetogama Township
- Elevation: 1,191 ft (363 m)

Population
  - Total: 70
- Time zone: UTC-6 (Central (CST))
  - Summer (DST): UTC-5 (CDT)
- ZIP code: 56669
- Area code: 218
- GNIS feature ID: 661605

Kabetogama (/ˌkæbəˈtoʊɡəmə/ KAB-ə-TOH-gə-mə) is an unincorporated community in Kabetogama Township, Saint Louis County, Minnesota, United States, located within the Kabetogama State Forest.

The community is located 27 miles southeast of International Falls on Saint Louis County Roads 122 and 123. Kabetogama is located 49 miles north of Cook.

U.S. Highway 53 is nearby. Voyageurs National Park is also in the vicinity. The boundary line between Saint Louis and Koochiching counties is also nearby.

== Notes ==
Adjacent Kabetogama Lake is one of four major lakes that make up the Voyageurs National Park. Kabetogama is the gateway into the park.

Kabetogama Lake has 25,000 acres (100 km^{2}) of waters and has 200 islands. Kabetogama Lake was carved from an ancient glacier flow. Kabetogama Lake runs into Namakan lake to the east.

Kabetogama is noted for walleye fishing. There are also northern pike, crappie, perch, and bass. At the entrance to the lake, there is a large statue of a walleye with a saddle that people can climb onto and have their picture taken. It's an icon that's associated with the lake and the fishing.

The islands of Kabetogama Lake and surrounding area have miles of trails and various campsites for park visitors to use.

Many families homesteaded houses or cabins on Kabetogama Lake before it was a part of Voyageurs National Park. One long-time resident of the Kabetogama community was noted woodcarver Hermund 'Herman' Melheim. He and his wife Lillian built a log cabin there in 1933. There he created innumerable intricate objects from white pine, including over 80 clocks, one of which appeared in Ripley's Believe It or Not! newspaper column. Lumberjack and guide John Salmi published a number of small books in the early 1970s, including Kabetogama, Minnesota Lumberjack and 'Five Lakes'.

The logging industry logged for White Pine trees in and around Kabetogama.

There are many outfitters in Kabetogama who rent out kayaks and canoes for people to explore the lake.

In the winter, visitors can ice fish, snowmobile, cross country ski and ice skate among other things.

The Kabetogama area is also known for hunting of whitetail deer, black bear, and small game birds.

Kabetogama Lake has many resorts that line the shores and is a vacation place for many returning and new people each year. Most visitors come in the summer when the weather is more agreeable.

Woodenfrog State Campground is located within the Kabetogama Lake shore lines. The campground was named after a Chippewa chief name Chief Woodenfrog.

The lake is roughly parallel to Rainy Lake. The Ojibwe name Gaa-biitoogamaag-zaaga'igan translates to "the lake that lies parallel or double with another lake." French fur trappers similarly referred to Kabetogama as Travere or Travers, meaning "alongside." A thin peninsula is all that separates lakes.

The 26,000-acre lake has myriad bays and more than 200 islands. It reaches a maximum depth of 80 feet and has an average water clarity of 9 feet. The largely undeveloped landscape is a transition zone between boreal and hardwood forests.

Kabetogama Lake has long been a popular destination for walleye anglers, and it was host to the 2010 Minnesota Governor's Fishing Opener on May 15, 2010. Walleye, sauger, northern pike, smallmouth bass, crappie, and perch grow faster there than they do in nearby lakes that are colder, deeper, and less fertile.

== Climate ==
Climate data for Kabetogama, Minnesota
| Month | Jan | Feb | Mar | Apr | May | Jun | Jul | Aug | Sep | Oct | Nov | Dec | Year |
|---|---|---|---|---|---|---|---|---|---|---|---|---|---|
| Record high °F (°C) | 47 (8) | 58 (14) | 78 (26) | 91 (33) | 95 (35) | 99 (37) | 102 (39) | 95 (35) | 96 (36) | 88 (31) | 74 (23) | 55 (13) | 102 (39) |
| Mean maximum °F (°C) | 38 (3) | 43 (6) | 58 (14) | 70 (21) | 83 (28) | 86 (30) | 89 (32) | 88 (31) | 84 (29) | 75 (24) | 56 (13) | 39 (4) | 86 (30) |
| Mean daily maximum °F (°C) | 15.7 (−9.1) | 19.7 (−6.8) | 35.5 (1.9) | 49.4 (9.7) | 63.8 (17.7) | 73.6 (23.1) | 78.6 (25.9) | 76.2 (24.6) | 67.3 (19.6) | 52.0 (11.1) | 34.2 (1.2) | 20.8 (−6.2) | 48.9 (9.4) |
| Daily mean °F (°C) | 4.6 (−15.2) | 6.7 (−14.1) | 22.3 (−5.4) | 36.5 (2.5) | 50.3 (10.2) | 60.6 (15.9) | 65.3 (18.5) | 62.9 (17.2) | 54.2 (12.3) | 41.0 (5.0) | 26.1 (−3.3) | 11.7 (−11.3) | 36.9 (2.7) |
| Mean daily minimum °F (°C) | −6.6 (−21.4) | −7 (−22) | 9.1 (−12.7) | 23.6 (−4.7) | 36.7 (2.6) | 47.7 (8.7) | 52.0 (11.1) | 49.6 (9.8) | 42.9 (6.1) | 30.9 (−0.6) | 18.3 (−7.6) | 2.7 (−16.3) | 26.0 (−3.3) |
| Mean minimum °F (°C) | −33 (−36) | −30 (−34) | −16 (−27) | 9 (−13) | 24 (−4) | 33 (1) | 40 (4) | 38 (3) | 27 (−3) | 16.9 (−8.4) | −4 (−20) | −25 (−32) | −37 (−38) |
| Record low °F (°C) | −58 (−50) | −50 (−46) | −38 (−39) | −14 (−26) | 5 (−15) | 20 (−7) | 23 (−5) | 26 (−3) | 17 (−8) | 0 (−18) | −34 (−37) | −45 (−43) | −55 (−48) |
| Average precipitation inches (mm) | 1.03 (26) | 0.80 (20) | 1.31 (33) | 1.89 (48) | 2.84 (72) | 4.48 (114) | 3.88 (99) | 3.19 (81) | 3.86 (98) | 2.49 (63) | 1.78 (45) | 1.11 (28) | 28.66 (727) |
| Average snowfall inches (cm) | 15.3 (39) | 12.7 (32) | 10.3 (26) | 6.6 (17) | 0.2 (0.51) | trace | 0.0 (0.0) | 0.0 (0.0) | 0.1 (0.25) | 1.4 (3.6) | 12.6 (32) | 17.2 (44) | 76.4 (194.36) |
Source: National Weather Service

== Media ==
=== Television ===
| Channel | Callsign | Affiliation | Branding | Subchannels | | Owner |
| (Virtual) | Callsign | Affiliation | Branding | Channel | Programming | Owner |
|---|---|---|---|---|---|---|
| 11.1 | K34LJ-D (KRII Translator) | NBC | KBJR 6 | 11.2; 11.3 | CBS; H&I/MyNetworkTV | County of Koochiching |
| 13.1 | K32LZ-D (WIRT Translator) | ABC | WCCO 4 | 13.2; 13.3 | MeTV; Ion Television | County of Koochiching |
| 31.1 | K36LA-D (WRPT Translator) | PBS | WDSE/WRPT | 31.2; 31.3; 31.4 | PBS Encore/World; Create; Minnesota Channel | County of Koochiching |

== Sources ==
- Rand McNally Road Atlas – 2007 edition – Minnesota entry
- Official State of Minnesota Highway Map – 2011/2012 edition
