= Carol-Lynn Parente =

American television producer, executive producer of Sesame Street

- Born: December 15, 1963 (age 62); Queens, New York, U.S.
- Occupation: Television producer
- Known for: Executive producer of the children's educational TV series Sesame Street / Creator of Hero Elementary & Skillsville

Carol-Lynn Parente (born December 15, 1963) is an American television producer, known as the executive producer of the children's educational TV series Sesame Street and creating the PBS KIDS series Hero Elementary & Skillsville.

== Early life ==
Carol-Lynn Parente was born in Queens, and grew up in West Milford, New Jersey. She majored in marketing and economics at Rutgers University.

== Career ==
Parente began working on the children's educational TV series Sesame Street as a post Production Assistant.

Parente managed the animation and post production of the show's Elmo's World segment, introduced to the show in 1998. She has also done similar work on Elmo's World: Happy Holidays and Kids Favorite Songs 2, both of which were winners of Telly Awards.

She was promoted to the position of executive producer in June 2005. She has won multiple Emmy Awards for her work on the show. As senior producer, Parente shared the Emmy Award in 2006 for "Outstanding Pre-School Children's Series", the seventh award she has earned.

== Personal life ==
Parente lives in Union City, New Jersey.

== Awards and accolades ==
In 2008 Parente was honored at the second annual Showtime 2009 gala at the Park Performing Arts Center in Union City, where she lives. She was given an award for her work, which she accepted with help from the Sesame Street character Elmo.
