= Ludwig B. Erdahl =

American politician (1889–1969)

Ludwig B. Erdahl (January 8, 1889 – May 31, 1969) was an American farmer and politician.

Erdahl was born in Frost, Faribault County, Minnesota and lived on a farm in Frost, Minnesota with his wife and family. He was involved with the Faribault County Fair. Erdahl served in the Minnesota House of Representatives from 1945 to 1962.
