= Dale Erdahl =

American businessman, farmer, and politician

Dale EmMons Erdahl (November 1, 1931 – May 16, 2005) was an American businessman, farmer, and politician.

Erdahl was born in Frost, Minnesota. He went to the Blue Earth County Public Schools and graduated from Blue Earth Area High School, in Blue Earth, Minnesota. in 1949. He went to Augsburg University and the University of Minnesota. He received his bachelor's degree in human services from Metropolitan State University in 1984. Erhahl lived in Blue Earth, Minnesota. He worked as an insurance underwriter and was a farmer. Erdahl served in the Minnesota House of Representatives from 1971 to 1974 and was a Republican. His cousin was Arlen Erdahl who also served in the Minnesota Legislature. He moved to Sioux Falls, South Dakota when he retired. He died in Sioux Falls, South Dakota.
