= Frost, Minnesota =

City in Minnesota, United States

Frost
- City
- Location of Frost, Minnesota
- Coordinates: 43°35′05″N 93°55′29″W
- Country: United States
- State: Minnesota
- County: Faribault

Government
  - Type: Mayor - Council
  - Mayor: Bob Loge

Area
  - Total: 0.44 sq mi (1.14 km^{2})
  - Land: 0.44 sq mi (1.14 km^{2})
  - Water: 0 sq mi (0.00 km^{2})
- Elevation: 1,132 ft (345 m)

Population (2020)
  - Total: 216
  - Density: 492.5/sq mi (190.16/km^{2})
- Time zone: UTC-6 (Central (CST))
  - Summer (DST): UTC-5 (CDT)
- ZIP code: 56033
- Area code: 507
- FIPS code: 27-22940
- GNIS feature ID: 2394830

Frost is a city in Faribault County, Minnesota, United States. The population was 215 at the 2020 census.

== History ==
A post office called Frost has been in operation since 1899. The city was named for architect Charles Sumner Frost.

== Geography ==
According to the United States Census Bureau, the city has a total area of 0.53 square miles (1.37 km^{2}), all land.

== Demographics ==
Historical population
Census	Pop.	Note	%±
1910	138		—
1920	252		82.6%
1930	233		−7.5%
1940	278		19.3%
1950	326		17.3%
1960	381		16.9%
1970	290		−23.9%
1980	293		1.0%
1990	236		−19.5%
2000	251		6.4%
2010	198		−21.1%
2020	216		9.1%
U.S. Decennial Census

=== 2010 census ===
As of the census of 2010, there were 198 people, 95 households, and 59 families living in the city. The population density was 373.6 inhabitants per square mile (144.2/km^{2}). There were 123 housing units at an average density of 232.1 per square mile (89.6/km^{2}). The racial makeup of the city was 97.0% White, 0.5% African American, 0.5% Native American, and 2.0% from two or more races. Hispanic or Latino of any race were 1.0% of the population.

There were 95 households, of which 22.1% had children under the age of 18 living with them, 51.6% were married couples living together, 7.4% had a female householder with no husband present, 3.2% had a male householder with no wife present, and 37.9% were non-families. 31.6% of all households were made up of individuals, and 11.6% had someone living alone who was 65 years of age or older. The average household size was 2.08 and the average family size was 2.59.

The median age in the city was 47.8 years. 18.7% of residents were under the age of 18; 6% were between the ages of 18 and 24; 21.2% were from 25 to 44; 34.4% were from 45 to 64; and 19.7% were 65 years of age or older. The gender makeup of the city was 49.0% male and 51.0% female.

=== 2000 census ===
As of the census of 2000, there were 251 people, 115 households, and 66 families living in the city. The population density was 476.7 inhabitants per square mile (184.1/km^{2}). There were 126 housing units at an average density of 239.3 per square mile (92.4/km^{2}). The racial makeup of the city was 96.81% White, 0.40% Asian, 2.79% from other races. Hispanic or Latino of any race were 2.79% of the population.

There were 115 households, out of which 32.2% had children under the age of 18 living with them, 43.5% were married couples living together, 9.6% had a female householder with no husband present, and 42.6% were non-families. 40.0% of all households were made up of individuals, and 25.2% had someone living alone who was 65 years of age or older. The average household size was 2.18 and the average family size was 2.94.

In the city, the population was spread out, with 27.9% under the age of 18, 9.6% from 18 to 24, 27.5% from 25 to 44, 14.7% from 45 to 64, and 20.3% who were 65 years of age or older. The median age was 38 years. For every 100 females, there were 87.3 males. For every 100 females age 18 and over, there were 81.0 males.

The median income for a household in the city was $26,389, and the median income for a family was $34,792. Males had a median income of $27,708 versus $23,750 for females. The per capita income for the city was $14,756. About 8.8% of families and 12.8% of the population were below the poverty line, including 16.7% of those under the age of eighteen and 18.2% of those 65 or over.

== Notable people ==
- Ernest Anderson (1902-1992), Farmer and Minnesota state legislator, was born in Frost.
- Lon Clark, actor
- Dale Erdahl (1931-2005), Businessman and Minnesota state legislator, was born in Frost.
- Ludwig B. Erdahl (1889-1969), Farmer and Minnesota state legislator, was born in Frost.

== Media ==
=== Television ===
Channel	Callsign	Affiliation	Branding	Subchannels		Owner
(Virtual)	Callsign	Affiliation	Branding	Channel	Programming	Owner
2.1	K16MA-D (KTCA Translator)	PBS	TPT 2	2.2; 2.4	Minnesota Channel; PBS Kids	Cooperative Television Association of Southern Minnesota
4.1	K35IU-D	CBS	WCCO 4	4.2; 17.1; 18.1	Start TV; Youtoo America; Laff	Cooperative Television Association of Southern Minnesota
5.1	K14KD-D (KSTP Translator)	ABC	5 Eyewitness News	5.7	Heroes & Icons	Cooperative Television Association of Southern Minnesota
5.2	K34NV-D (KSTC Translator)	Ind.	45 TV	5.3; 5.4; 5.6	MeTV; Antenna TV; This TV	Cooperative Television Association of Southern Minnesota
9.2	K29IF-D (WFTC Translator)	Ind.	FOX 9 Plus	9.3; 9.1	Movies! FOX	Cooperative Television Association of Southern Minnesota
9.9	K19LJ-D (KMSP Translator)	FOX	FOX 9	9.4; 9.5	Buzzr; Light TV	Cooperative Television Association of Southern Minnesota
11.1	K31EF-D (KARE Translator)	NBC	KARE 11	11.2; 11.3; 11.4	Court TV; True Crime Network; Quest	Cooperative Television Association of Southern Minnesota
16.1	K27FI-D	Coop TV		16.2; 16.3; 16.4; 16.5; 23.5	The Action Channel; Heartland; AMG TV; Biz TV; Grit	Cooperative Television Association of Southern Minnesota
23.1	K23FY-D (WUCW Translator)	CW	CW 23	23.2; 23.3; 23.4	Comet; Charge! TBD	Cooperative Television Association of Southern Minnesota
41.1	K17MX-D (KPXM Translator)	ION	ION	41.2; 41.3; 41.4; 41.5; 41.6	Qubo; Ion Plus; ION Shop; QVC; HSN	Cooperative Television Association of Southern Minnesota
