= KSMQ-TV =

Television station in Austin, Minnesota

- Austin–Rochester–Albert Lea, Minnesota; Mason City, Iowa; United States
- City: Austin, Minnesota
- Channels: Digital: 20 (UHF); Virtual: 15
- Branding: Minnesota PBS

Programming
- Affiliations: 15.1: PBS; for others, see § Subchannels

Ownership
- Owner: Twin Cities Public Television, Inc.

History
- First air date: October 17, 1972
- Former call signs: KAVT-TV (1972–1984)
- Former channel numbers: Analog: 15 (UHF, 1972–2009)
- Call sign meaning: Southern Minnesota Quality

Technical information
- Licensing authority: FCC
- Facility ID: 28510
- ERP: 319.2 kW
- HAAT: 302.7 m (993 ft)
- Transmitter coordinates: 43°38′34″N 92°31′36″W

Links
- Public license information: Public file; LMS
- Website: www.minnesotapbs.org

KSMQ-TV (channel 15) is a PBS member television station in Austin, Minnesota, United States, serving the Rochester–Austin, Minnesota, metropolitan area. The station is owned by Twin Cities Public Television, Inc. as part of its Minnesota PBS network. KSMQ-TV's studios are located at the KSMQ PBS Broadcast Center on West Oakland Avenue in Austin, and its transmitter is located in rural east-central Mower County, between Grand Meadow and Ostrander.

Channel 15 went on the air as KAVT-TV in 1972. It was built as part of the Austin schools' vocational-technical training program, a predecessor to what is now Riverland Community College, and provided public television programming to Austin and its immediate environs. In 1980, it began regional expansion to the rest of southern Minnesota. Because cable systems placed it on different channels, it dropped its channel number branding and changed call signs to KSMQ-TV, using the on-air name Q-TV, in 1984. The Austin school system spun KSMQ-TV off in 2004 to a community licensee composed of local organizations, the Austin school board, Riverland Community College, and the cities of Austin and Albert Lea. The station relocated from the Riverland campus to downtown Austin in 2022.

== History ==
On January 27, 1971, the Independent School District #492 of Austin, Minnesota, applied to the Federal Communications Commission (FCC) for permission to build a television station on UHF channel 15 in Austin. The commission granted a construction permit on May 17, 1971, and KAVT-TV signed on the air on October 17, 1972. It was owned by the Austin school board (Independent School District #492) and formed part of the Austin Area Vocational-Technical Institute (AAVTI), which housed its studios. KAVT-TV's early broadcasts were minimal. With no connection to PBS, it operated for an hour every weekday during the school year. The station was connected to PBS in 1974; that year, it began year-round and evening operation to comply with new requirements from the Corporation for Public Broadcasting, which stipulated a minimum output for stations to receive federal funding. In addition to educational television for local schools, the station began offering University of Minnesota Extension telecourses. Viewers often struggled to tune the station in; it was the only UHF station on the air in the area at the time, and many viewers mistakenly believed cable was required to receive it. Students at the Vocational-Technical Institute were involved in program production; despite being Minnesota's smallest public TV station, KAVT-TV by 1981 was the second-largest producer of local programs behind KTCA in the Twin Cities, with an annual local program output of 125 hours.

In 1980, the Austin school board approved the construction of a new, 428-foot (130 m) tower near the institute to expand KAVT-TV's coverage to areas including Rochester and Blue Earth. The board received a federal grant to pay for part of the project. The station anticipated expanding its coverage from a 14.5-mile (23.3 km) radius to a 33-mile (53 km) radius. The new facility, debuted on August 23, 1981; in the years that followed, cable systems including those in Rochester and Mankato added KAVT-TV to their lineups.

On July 19, 1984, KAVT-TV changed its call sign to KSMQ-TV, representing "Southern Minnesota Quality", and began branding itself on-air as Q-TV. The rebrand was undertaken because while the station had called itself "channel 15" on the air, the cable systems that had added KAVT-TV to their lineups in recent years placed the station on different channel numbers, creating confusion. From 1981 to 1992, the station was co-owned with Austin radio station KAVT-FM 91.3, which was transferred to Minnesota State University, Mankato, in 1992 and became KMSK.

Austin Public Schools continued as the licensee of KSMQ-TV, even though the vocational-technical institute and the facilities had become separated from the school board; the AAVTI became the Austin Technical Institute in 1986 and Austin Technical College in 1989, split from the school board and merged with similar institutions in Rochester and Faribault to become Minnesota Riverland Technical College in 1991, and combined with Austin Community College and South Central Technical College of Albert Lea to form Riverland Community College in 1996. The school board in August 2004 approved the transfer of KSMQ to a new community licensee known as Southern Minnesota Quality Broadcasting. The non-profit's board consisted of representatives from Austin Public Schools, Riverland Community College, Rochester Community and Technical College (RCTC), the cities of Austin and Albert Lea, Hiawatha Broadband, and Hormel Foods. After the completion of the transfer in May 2005, each member provided financial contributions or donations; for instance, Albert Lea offered legal and technological assistance, while Riverland's contribution consisted of the facilities and utilities expenses. In 2009, KSMQ opened a Rochester office on the RCTC campus and began producing some programming there. That same year, the station ceased analog broadcasting and converted to digital.

On the early morning of September 5, 2012, the tower on the Riverland Community College campus housing the studio transmitter link connecting the KSMQ-TV studio to the Grand Meadow transmitter tower collapsed during straight-line winds as severe thunderstorms moved through the Austin area, partially falling onto a building that housed the station's power equipment. There were no injuries, but the station had no way to deliver programs to its transmitter. The station set up alternate facilities the following evening by installing a microwave dish atop its studios and manually directing it at the transmitter tower. While insurance covered the costs of constructing a new tower, the station subsequently set up a fund to help cover a minimum $7,000 deductible that the station owed. After a two-year dispute, KSMQ and Hanover Insurance—which had maintained the tower collapse was caused by a loose anchor and not the winds and thus denied the claim—reached a settlement in 2014. KSMQ began high-definition broadcasting in 2015.

Logo used until 2026

KSMQ began planning for a new studio in 2016 and received expressions of interest from Rochester and Owatonna about relocating. In 2017, it received a $2.3 million grant from the Hormel Foundation conditional on the facility being built in Austin, and the next year, it approached the Minnesota Legislature in 2018 seeking funds for a new, purpose-built studio facility in downtown Austin. This would enable it to move out of Riverland Community College, where it had been occupying a former woodworking shop; props were being stored in trailers for lack of room, and staffers had to exit the KSMQ area to access restrooms. The station sought a higher-visibility location than Riverland, which was on the edge of town. After the state granted KSMQ $2.5 million, the city of Austin purchased a downtown office building for the project; the city held the bonds because Minnesota state law did not allow non-profits to directly receive bond monies. Groundbreaking was held in October 2021 for a facility dubbed the Broadcast Center at 107 W. Oakland Street in downtown Austin. The facility was built during the 12-year leadership tenure of Eric Olson, a former reporter and anchor for KARE in Minneapolis. Olson departed the station in 2023, after which an audit found that he had spent $49,000 on a KSMQ credit card between 2021 and 2022 but mostly lacked receipts to document the purchases.

We have worked hard over the last year to identify other sources of revenue but ultimately, we could not overcome the loss of over 40% of our budget.

— Kathleen Harrington, chair, KSMQ board of directors

The Corporation for Public Broadcasting (CPB) represented 43 percent of KSMQ-TV's revenue in fiscal year 2024. The rescission of further CPB funding by Congress led the station to be unsure whether it could viably continue. As a result, in April 2026, KSMQ Public Service Media entered into an asset acquisition agreement with Twin Cities Public Television to sell the station's assets and continue to provide public broadcasting in the KSMQ service area, as well as a management and programming agreement for the provision of services. Under the deal, TPT committed to ensure representation of Southeast and South Central Minnesota on its board of trustees, retain a local presence in the region, and fulfill obligations the station made under a previous state grant.

== Funding ==
In fiscal year 2024, KSMQ had total revenue of $2,033,187. The Corporation for Public Broadcasting contributed a $787,000 Community Service Grant and $95,000 from other sources, while the station received $675,000 in grants and contributions other than underwriting from state government sources. KSMQ had 1,150 members who contributed a total of $111,578.

== Local programming ==
Local content produced by KSMQ includes Off 90, a weekly arts program that began production in 2010; R-Town, a weekly public affairs program focusing on Rochester; and the agricultural education program Farm Connections. The station also airs documentaries and music specials.

== Subchannels ==
KSMQ-TV's transmitter is located in rural east-central Mower County, between Grand Meadow and Ostrander. The station's signal is multiplexed:

Subchannels of KSMQ-TV
Subchannel	Res.	Short name	Programming
15.1	1080i	MNPBS	PBS
15.2	480i	MNCH	Minnesota Channel
15.3	480i	MNLIFE	PBS
15.4	720p	MNKIDS	PBS Kids
15.5	720p	MNREADY	24/7 Weather
