= WDSE-FM =

Coordinates: 46.792°N 92.123°W

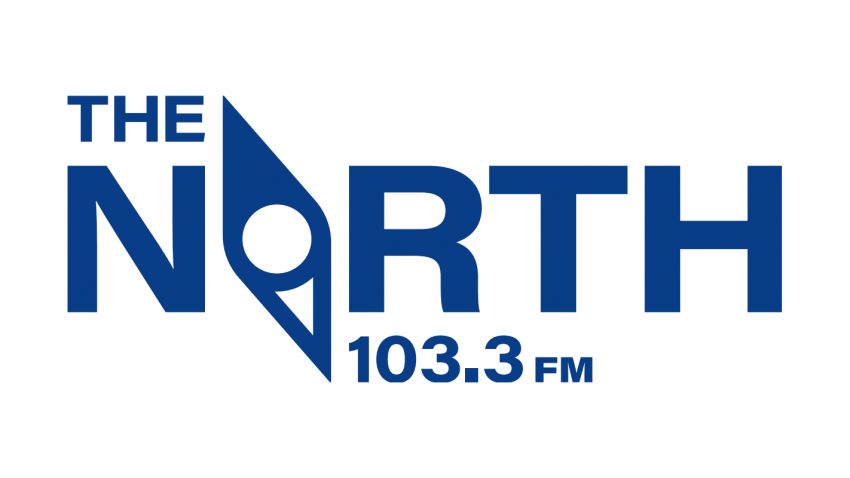
- Duluth, Minnesota; United States
- Broadcast area: Duluth, Minnesota; Superior, Wisconsin
- Frequency: 103.3 MHz
- Branding: The North 103.3

Programming
- Format: Public radio

Ownership
- Owner: Duluth–Superior Area Educational Television Corporation
- Sister stations: WDSE (TV)

History
- First air date: 1971
- Former call signs: WDTH (1971–1982); KUMD-FM (1982–2021)

Technical information
- Licensing authority: FCC
- Facility ID: 55571
- Class: C1
- ERP: 95,000 watts
- HAAT: 250 m (820 ft)

Links
- Public license information: Public file; LMS
- Webcast: Listen live
- Website: www.thenorth1033.org

WDSE-FM (103.3 MHz) is a 95,000–watt public radio station in Duluth, Minnesota, operated by the Duluth–Superior Area Educational Television Corporation. The station primarily carries an adult album alternative radio format, but also has a number of specialty programs focusing on jazz, blues, and other genres. It is part of Minnesota's Independent Public Radio network, and programming from national sources include World Cafe and American Routes.

== History ==
The station was founded by students at the University of Minnesota Duluth in 1957 as KUMD, a 10-watt AM station in the basement of what was then Washburn Hall dormitory on the old main campus in a residential neighborhood of Duluth. The first station manager was student Bruce Elving, and the first chief engineer was Douglas Hedin. Hedin also built the station's first transmitter. The station was closed down several times by the FCC in its early days due to out-of-compliance technical standards.

KUMD went through a series of changes and fits and starts in its early days, including station managers, due to the student-run nature of the college radio station. In 1962, stronger faculty advisors were appointed as the station converted to 250 watts FM as KUMD-FM. The dean of UMD's School of Humanities, R. Dale Miller, also became involved at this time and became a major supporter of expansion of the station. The last of these "stronger" advisors was Joe Zesbaugh, who helped professionalize the operation. Zesbaugh left in the summer of 1969 to run public television at Arizona State University. His short-term successor left under unclear circumstances, at which time student broadcasters regained control of the station. Station managers during this period included Michael (Mickey) Dean, Frank Noviello, Phil Glende, Dave Tuenge, and Tom Livingston. Programming matured dramatically, featuring locally produced public affairs programming, a news operation, and music including jazz, classical, folk, and other "alternative" music not otherwise available in the Duluth/Superior radio market. KUMD also experimented with live sportscasting during this time including several remote broadcasts of the University basketball games. these broadcasts were anchored by Eric Eskola, who subsequently worked as announcer for Duluth's CBS radio affiliate (KDAL) and eventually moved to WCCO radio in Minneapolis as its legislative and political reporter, and the co-host of Twin Cities Public Television's weekly Almanac public affairs program. KUMD's bedrock programming philosophy was to offer only programming that was not available on other Twin Ports radio stations. The station was almost totally staffed by student volunteers, who at the time often numbered around 100 at any given time. There were some part-time paid staff who led the volunteers and who were also students.

Livingston eventually convinced the university to take over a defunct commercial 100,000-watt station (WDTH) and to affiliate with National Public Radio. He also introduced the concept of listener support and began on-air fund drives to help fund the station's operations. The station became known as WDTH for several years before reclaiming its KUMD-FM call letters. Livingston served as the station manager for eight years. He was succeeded by Paul Schmitz, who was eventually succeeded (again) by Michael (Mickey) Dean, who was succeeded by Vicky Jacoba.

The station was sold to the Duluth–Superior Area Educational Television Corporation on December 1, 2021, for $175,000, and took the callsign WDSE-FM.

== See also ==
- KUOM (Radio K) – University of Minnesota Twin Cities station
- KUMM (U90) – University of Minnesota Morris station
