= Lakeland PBS =

PBS member network in Minnesota, U.S.

KAWE and KAWB

KAWE: Bemidji, Minnesota; KAWB: Brainerd, Minnesota; United States
- Channels for KAWE: Digital: 9 (VHF); Virtual: 9
- Channels for KAWB: Digital: 28 (UHF); Virtual: 22
- Branding: Lakeland PBS

Programming
- Affiliations: 9.1/22.1: PBS; for others, see § Subchannels

Ownership
- Owner: Northern Minnesota Public Television, Inc.

History
- First air date: KAWE: June 1, 1980; KAWB: March 1, 1988
- Former channel number: KAWE: Analog: 9 (VHF, 1980–2009); Digital: 18 (UHF, until 2009); KAWB: Analog: 22 (UHF, 1988–2009)
- Call sign meaning: KAWE: Derived from the Ojibwe word 'akawe' generally meaning 'first in a line of succession'; KAWB: KAWE Brainerd

Technical information
- Licensing authority: FCC
- Facility ID: KAWE: 49578; KAWB: 49579
- ERP: KAWE: 27.0 kW; KAWB: 137.5 kW
- HAAT: KAWE: 334.7 m (1,098 ft); KAWB: 227 m (745 ft)
- Transmitter coordinates: KAWE: 47°42′3″N 94°29′15″W; KAWB: 46°25′21″N 94°27′42″W
- Translator: See § Translators

Links
- Public license information: KAWE: Public file; LMS; KAWB: Public file; LMS
- Website: lptv.org

Lakeland PBS is the collective brand for two PBS member television stations serving northern and central Minnesota: KAWE (channel 9) in Bemidji and KAWB (channel 22) in Brainerd. The stations are owned by Northern Minnesota Public Television, Inc., and maintain studios on Grant Avenue Northeast in northeast Bemidji with a secondary studio and an underwriting office on NW 3rd Street in northwest Brainerd. KAWE's transmitter is located southeast of Blackduck, while KAWB's tower sits near East Gull Lake.

KAWB operates as a full-time satellite of KAWE, covering areas of central Minnesota that receive a marginal to non-existent over-the-air signal from the main station, although there is significant overlap between their contours otherwise. KAWB is a straight simulcast of KAWE; on-air references to KAWB are limited to Federal Communications Commission (FCC)-mandated hourly station identifications during programming.

The network first took to the air on June 1, 1980, and was formerly known as Lakeland Public Television; it re-branded on January 8, 2018, to better align its brand with PBS. It is the only full-power television broadcasting operation based in north central Minnesota, an area that is served mainly by translators of the Minneapolis–Saint Paul television stations.

Lakeland PBS utilizes KAWB's channel 22 position on DirecTV and Dish Network's Twin Cities local lineups to avert confusion with Fox owned-and-operated station KMSP-TV (channel 9) in Minneapolis.

== Newscasts ==
Lakeland PBS produces a 30-minute local newscast Monday through Friday. The newscast originates from its studios in Bemidji, and the station also has a news-production facility in Brainerd. Lakeland PBS airs the only local newscast in north central Minnesota.

== Technical information ==
=== Subchannels ===
Lakeland PBS' television signals are multiplexed into six subchannels.

Subchannels of KAWE and KAWB
| Channel | | Res. | Short name | Programming |
| KAWE | KAWB | Res. | Short name | Programming |
|---|---|---|---|---|
| 9.1 | 22.1 | 720p | L-HD | PBS |
| 9.2 | 22.2 | 480i | FNX | First Nations Experience |
| 9.3 | 22.3 | 480i | L-Kids | PBS Kids |
| 9.4 | 22.4 | 480i | Create | Create |
| 9.5 | 22.5 | 480i | L-Plus | Encore programming |
| 9.6 | 22.6 | 480i | L-MN | Minnesota Channel |

=== Translators ===
The broadcast areas of KAWE and KAWB are extended by way of nine digital translators in northern and central Minnesota.

- Alexandria: K36KH-D (translates KAWB)
- Baudette: K25MW-D (translates KAWE)
- Big Falls: K29KE-D (translates KAWE)
- Birchdale: K35MY-D (translates KAWE)
- International Falls: K18MB-D (translates KAWE)
- Red Lake: K36OA-D (translates KAWE)
- Roseau: K24MS-D (translates KAWE)
- Walker: K24KT-D (translates KAWE 9.1)
- Williams: W32EG-D (translates KAWE)
