= WDSE (TV) =

Television station in Duluth, Minnesota

WDSE and WRPT

WDSE: Duluth, Minnesota; Superior, Wisconsin; WRPT: Hibbing, Minnesota; United States
- Channels for WDSE: Digital: 8 (VHF); Virtual: 8
- Channels for WRPT: Digital: 31 (UHF); Virtual: 31
- Branding: PBS North

Programming
- Affiliations: 8.1/31.1: PBS; for others, see § Subchannels

Ownership
- Owner: Duluth–Superior Area Educational Television Corporation
- Sister stations: WDSE-FM

History
- First air date: WDSE: September 1, 1964; WRPT: December 27, 2008
- Former call signs: WDSE: WDSE-TV (1964–2009)
- Former channel number: WDSE: Analog: 8 (VHF, 1964–2009); Digital: 38 (UHF, 2003–2009)
- Former affiliations: WDSE: NET (1964–1970)
- Call sign meaning: WDSE: Duluth–Superior Educational; WRPT: Iron Range Public Television

Technical information
- Licensing authority: FCC
- Facility ID: WDSE: 17726; WRPT: 159007
- ERP: WDSE: 34 kW; WRPT: 250 kW
- HAAT: WDSE: 295 m (968 ft); WRPT: 167 m (548 ft)
- Transmitter coordinates: WDSE: 46°47′29.7″N 92°7′21.4″W; WRPT: 47°22′53″N 92°57′16″W

Links
- Public license information: WDSE: Public file; LMS; WRPT: Public file; LMS
- Website: pbsnorth.org

WDSE (channel 8) in Duluth, Minnesota, and WRPT (channel 31) in Hibbing, Minnesota, collectively branded PBS North, are PBS member television stations serving northeast Minnesota and northwest Wisconsin. Owned by the Duluth–Superior Area Educational Television Corporation, WDSE shares common ownership with adult album alternative radio station WDSE-FM (103.3). The two outlets share studios at the Sax Brothers Memorial Communications Center on the campus of the University of Minnesota Duluth on Niagara Court in the east side of Duluth; the television station's transmitter is located west of downtown Duluth in Hilltop Park.

WRPT operates as a full-time satellite of WDSE; this station's transmitter is located at Maple Hill Park south of Hibbing. WRPT covers areas of Minnesota's Iron Range (including Grand Rapids, Virginia and Chisholm) that receive a marginal to non-existent over-the-air signal from WDSE, although there is significant overlap between the two stations' contours otherwise. WRPT is a straight simulcast of WDSE; on-air references to WRPT are limited to Federal Communications Commission (FCC)–mandated hourly station identifications during programming. Aside from the transmitter, WRPT does not maintain any physical presence locally in Hibbing.

== History ==
WDSE first went on the air on September 13, 1964, as the second educational station in Minnesota. The founding general manager was George Beck, former principal of Duluth Central High School, who had led the campaign for educational television in the Twin Ports for over a decade.

The station originally operated from the Bradley Building in downtown Duluth. When the building was condemned to make room for Interstate 35, UMD offered the station space on campus for a new studio. WDSE moved to its current facility in 1978. It is named the Sax Brothers Memorial Communications Center in honor of the brothers of Duluth physician Milton Sax, who gave the initial $200,000 bequest for the project.

In November 1982, WDSE was the first Minnesota television broadcaster to utilize a circularly polarized broadcast antenna, and in April 1985 it was the first in Minnesota to begin full-time stereo television broadcasting. Its digital signal first went on the air on April 28, 2003, and in May 2003, WDSE became the first broadcaster in Minnesota to launch a channel, 8.2 PBS-HD, fully devoted to high-definition programming. In June 2008, WDSE became the first station in the Duluth–Superior market to begin producing local programming in high definition. WDSE/WRPT was the first station in the Duluth–Superior market to begin broadcasting in 5.1 Dolby surround sound starting June 12, 2009. On June 16, 2009, WDSE-TV/DT officially changed the station's call sign to simply WDSE, dropping the "TV" or "DT" at the end of the call sign.

WRPT began broadcasting December 27, 2008, utilizing a directional antenna that beams the signal across the Minnesota Iron Range communities. Much of this area had been among the few areas without a clear over-the-air signal from a PBS station; Iron Range viewers had only been able to watch WDSE when cable arrived in the area in the 1970s. WRPT was one of the first of two construction permits ever granted by the FCC as a "digital singleton" facility; making it a rare ground-up digital only station that had no analog counterpart. On March 1, 2010, WRPT-DT officially changed the station's call sign to simply WRPT dropping the "DT" at the end of the call sign.

In late August 2010, WDSE was rebranded from "PBS eight" to "PBS North" to reflect their extended coverage with WRPT into more of northeastern Minnesota. In 2012, the stations rebranded under their call letters as "WDSE-WRPT". The PBS North branding was reinstated in January 2023, with a new North Star-inspired logo symbolizing the stations' goal to "illuminate, inspire and enrich lives to strengthen community".

== Programming ==
Along with programming from PBS, Minnesota Public Television and PBS Wisconsin, locally produced programs such as Minnesota Legislative Report, WDSE Cooks, Almanac North, Venture North, Native Report, Great Gardening, Lawyers on the Line, and Doctors on Call are area favorites included in the broadcast schedule. WDSE produces, broadcasts, and supplies to the networks an intensive schedule of local and regional programming.

== Technical information ==
=== Subchannels ===
The stations' signals are multiplexed:

Subchannels of WDSE and WRPT
Channel		Res.	Short name		Programming
WDSE	WRPT	Res.	WDSE	WRPT	Programming
8.1	31.1	1080i	North		PBS
8.2	31.2	720p	Explore		PBS Explore / World Channel
8.3	31.3	720p	Create		Create
8.4	31.4	480i	MN CHAN	MN Chan	Minnesota Channel
8.5	31.5	480i	PBSKIDS	Kids	PBS Kids

=== Analog-to-digital conversion ===
WDSE discontinued regular programming on its analog signal, over VHF channel 8, on June 12, 2009, as part of the federally mandated transition from analog to digital television. The station's digital signal relocated from its pre-transition UHF channel 38 to VHF channel 8. The station has an application to increase its power from 34,000 watts to 47,500 watts.

=== Translator ===
City of license	Callsign	Channel	Translating	ERP	HAAT	Facility ID	Transmitter coordinates	Owner
Kabetogama	K36LA-D	36	WRPT	0.1 kW	125 m (410 ft)	14106	48°21′40.0″N 93°00′37.0″W	Koochiching County

The last translator owned directly by WDSE was K67CT in Grand Marais. Rather than move from channel 67 to a channel between 2 and 51 as required to comply with the digital television transition in the United States, the translator was taken off the air December 1, 2011.
