= Minnesota Channel =

Legislative broadcaster of Minnesota

- Type: Educational television, public affairs, ethnic and local programming
- Country: United States
- Broadcast area: Minnesota, North Dakota, eastern South Dakota and surrounding regions

Ownership
- Owner: Twin Cities Public Television

History
- Founded: 2005
- Launched: 2007

Links
- Website: TPT's Minnesota Productions & Partnerships

The Minnesota Channel is an American free-to-air television network originating at Twin Cities Public Television. It features programming related to Minnesota (and some related to Wisconsin and North Dakota), plus coverage of the Minnesota Legislature when in session. The Minnesota Channel is carried as a digital subchannel on all six member networks of the Minnesota Public Television Association.

== History ==
In early 2003, TPT began setting aside time on KTCI for the "Minnesota Channel", an evening dedicated to local and regional related programming, frequently produced in partnership with other nonprofit and public service organizations. The service expanded from one to two evenings in 2004 and, on September 16, 2005, became a new full-time digital channel, tptMN (digital channel 17.2, Comcast (Saint Paul) 243, Comcast (Minneapolis) 202, and Mediacom 102). The Minnesota Channel was expanded to region wide coverage in Minnesota and North Dakota in February 2008. In October 2012, the Minnesota Channel changed picture formats from 4:3 to 16:9 widescreen.

== Programming ==
Since its inception, the MN Channel has co-produced more than 250 programs with more than 100 partner organizations: non-profits, universities, governmental agencies and other public service organizations.

Among the programs broadcast on the MN Channel are several targeting ethnic communities that now call Minnesota and the Twin Cities home and who are generally under-served by commercial media. Some of these shows are also broadcast on Public-access television cable television channels in the region:

- Zona Latina (Latino)
- Kev Koom Siab (Hmong)
- Geetmala (Hindi)
- BelAhdan (Middle Eastern)
- Journey to the East (Chinese)
- Vietnamese News (Vietnamese)

The network's website features information on programs and partners, plus a regularly-updated blog.

== Affiliates ==
=== Minnesota ===
- KTCI (2.2 and 2.6) St. Paul/Minneapolis (Available in HD)
- WDSE (8.4) Duluth / WRPT (31.4) Hibbing
- KAWE (9.6) Bemidji / KAWB (22.6) Brainerd
- KWCM-TV (10.3) Appleton / KSMN (20.3) Worthington/Sioux Falls
- KSMQ-TV (15.2) Austin/Rochester

=== North Dakota ===
Prairie Public Television carries Minnesota Channel in North Dakota.

- KGFE (2.3) Grand Forks (Available in HD)
- KBME-TV (3.3) Bismarck
- KWSE (4.3) Williston
- KSRE (6.3) Minot
- KDSE (9.3) Dickinson
- KFME (13.3) Fargo
- KCGE (16.3) Crookston, MN / Grand Forks
- KJRE (19.3) Ellendale
- KMDE (25.3) Devils Lake
