= Lewisville, Minnesota =

City in Minnesota, United States

Lewisville
- City
- Location of Lewisville, Minnesota
- Coordinates: 43°55′27″N 94°26′03″W
- Country: United States
- State: Minnesota
- County: Watonwan

Government
  - Type: Mayor – Council
  - Mayor: Barbara Pfeil

Area
  - Total: 0.25 sq mi (0.64 km^{2})
  - Land: 0.25 sq mi (0.64 km^{2})
  - Water: 0 sq mi (0.00 km^{2})
- Elevation: 1,063 ft (324 m)

Population (2020)
  - Total: 204
  - Density: 831.0/sq mi (320.85/km^{2})
- Time zone: UTC-6 (Central (CST))
  - Summer (DST): UTC-5 (CDT)
- ZIP code: 56060
- Area code: 507
- FIPS code: 27-36818
- GNIS feature ID: 2395694

Lewisville is a city in Watonwan County, Minnesota, United States. The population was 204 at the 2020 census.

== History ==
Lewisville was platted in 1899. The city was named for the Lewis family, original owners of the town site. A post office has been in operation at Lewisville since 1899. Lewisville was incorporated in 1902.

== Geography ==
According to the United States Census Bureau, the city has a total area of 0.29 square miles (0.75 km^{2}), all land.

Minnesota State Highways 15 and 30 (co-signed) serve as a main route in the community.

== Demographics ==
Historical population
| Census | Pop. | Note | %± |
|---|---|---|---|
| 1910 | 218 | | — |
| 1920 | 229 | | 5.0% |
| 1930 | 305 | | 33.2% |
| 1940 | 301 | | −1.3% |
| 1950 | 362 | | 20.3% |
| 1960 | 375 | | 3.6% |
| 1970 | 291 | | −22.4% |
| 1980 | 273 | | −6.2% |
| 1990 | 255 | | −6.6% |
| 2000 | 274 | | 7.5% |
| 2010 | 250 | | −8.8% |
| 2020 | 204 | | −18.4% |
U.S. Decennial Census

=== 2010 census ===
As of the census of 2010, there were 250 people, 101 households, and 68 families residing in the city. The population density was 862.1 inhabitants per square mile (332.9/km^{2}). There were 116 housing units at an average density of 400.0 per square mile (154.4/km^{2}). The racial makeup of the city was 94.4% White, 1.6% African American, 0.4% Native American, 1.2% Asian, and 2.4% from two or more races. Hispanic or Latino of any race were 13.2% of the population.

There were 101 households, of which 29.7% had children under the age of 18 living with them, 51.5% were married couples living together, 8.9% had a female householder with no husband present, 6.9% had a male householder with no wife present, and 32.7% were non-families. 27.7% of all households were made up of individuals, and 10.9% had someone living alone who was 65 years of age or older. The average household size was 2.48 and the average family size was 3.07.

The median age in the city was 40 years. 26.8% of residents were under the age of 18; 8.4% were between the ages of 18 and 24; 18.4% were from 25 to 44; 29.2% were from 45 to 64; and 17.2% were 65 years of age or older. The gender makeup of the city was 53.2% male and 46.8% female.

=== 2000 census ===
As of the census of 2000, there were 274 people, 113 households, and 70 families residing in the city. The population density was 936.1 inhabitants per square mile (361.4/km^{2}). There were 126 housing units at an average density of 430.5 per square mile (166.2/km^{2}). The racial makeup of the city was 90.88% White, 6.93% from other races, and 2.19% from two or more races. Hispanic or Latino of any race were 10.58% of the population.

There were 113 households, out of which 32.7% had children under the age of 18 living with them, 50.4% were married couples living together, 7.1% had a female householder with no husband present, and 37.2% were non-families. 31.9% of all households were made up of individuals, and 15.9% had someone living alone who was 65 years of age or older. The average household size was 2.42 and the average family size was 3.03.

In the city, the population was spread out, with 29.9% under the age of 18, 5.8% from 18 to 24, 25.5% from 25 to 44, 20.1% from 45 to 64, and 18.6% who were 65 years of age or older. The median age was 38 years. For every 100 females, there were 89.0 males. For every 100 females age 18 and over, there were 90.1 males.

The median income for a household in the city was $29,432, and the median income for a family was $31,635. Males had a median income of $24,583 versus $17,083 for females. The per capita income for the city was $12,700. About 9.1% of families and 15.2% of the population were below the poverty line, including 18.4% of those under the age of eighteen and 16.7% of those 65 or over.
