= Minnesota PBS =

PBS member station in Minnesota

KTCA-TV and KTCI-TV

Saint Paul–Minneapolis, Minnesota; United States
- Channels for KTCA-TV: Digital: 34 (UHF); Virtual: 2.1
- Channels for KTCI-TV: Digital: 23 (UHF); Virtual: 2.3
- Branding: Minnesota PBS

Programming
- Affiliations: 2.1/2.3: PBS; for others, see § Subchannels

Ownership
- Owner: Twin Cities Public Television, Inc.

History
- First air date: KTCA-TV: September 16, 1957; KTCI-TV: May 4, 1965
- Former call signs: KTCA-TV: KCTE-TV (CP, 1954); KTCA (CP, 1954–1955)
- Former channel number: KTCA-TV: Analog: 2 (VHF, 1957–2009); KTCI-TV: Analog: 17 (UHF, 1965–2009); Digital: 16 (UHF, 1999–2010)
- Former affiliations: KTCA-TV: NET (1957–1970)
- Call sign meaning: KTCA-TV: Twin Cities Area; KTCI-TV: Twin Cities

Technical information
- Licensing authority: FCC
- Facility ID: KTCA-TV: 68594; KTCI-TV: 68597
- ERP: KTCA-TV: 662 kW; KTCI-TV: 325 kW
- HAAT: 411.1 m (1,349 ft)
- Transmitter coordinates: 45°3′30″N 93°7′28″W
- Translator: see § Translators

Links
- Public license information: KTCA-TV: Public file; LMS; KTCI-TV: Public file; LMS
- Website: www.minnesotapbs.org

Twin Cities Public Television, Inc., doing business as Minnesota PBS, is a nonprofit organization based in Saint Paul, Minnesota, United States, that operates the Twin Cities' two PBS member television stations, KTCA-TV (channel 2.1) and KTCI-TV (channel 2.3), both licensed to Saint Paul. It produces programs for local, regional and national television broadcast, operates numerous websites, and produces rich media content for Web distribution.

Minnesota PBS's offices and studio facilities are on East 4th Street in downtown Saint Paul; KTCA-TV and KTCI-TV transmit from the KMSP Tower in Shoreview, Minnesota.

Minnesota PBS also serves the Mankato market via K26CS-D (relaying KTCA) and K29IE-D (relaying KTCI) in nearby St. James through the local municipal-operated Cooperative TV (CTV) network of translators as that area does not have a PBS member station of its own.

== History ==
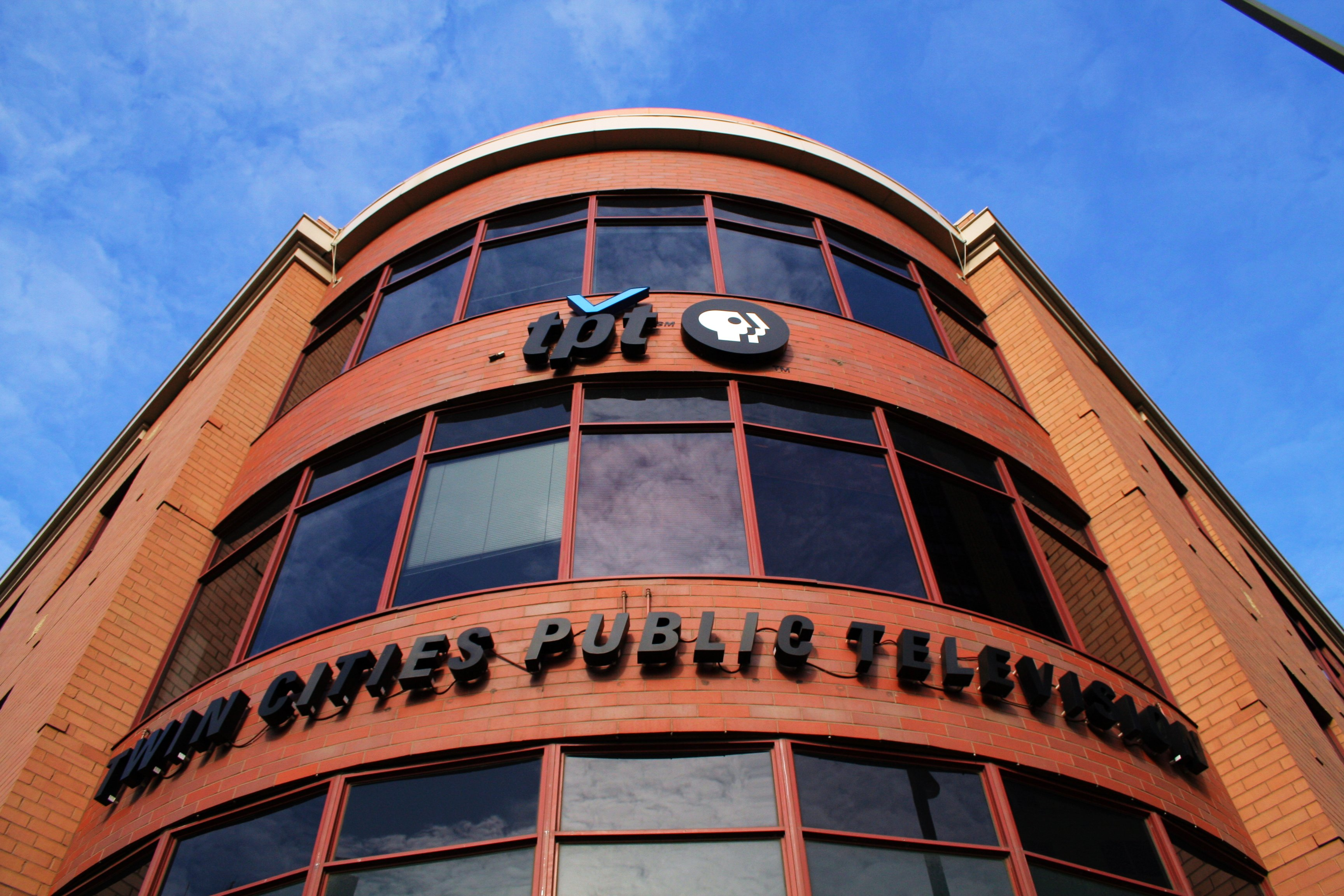
Twin Cities PBS headquarters in Downtown Saint Paul

Twin Cities Public Television was originally incorporated in 1955 as Twin City Area Educational Television.

KTCA (channel 2) began broadcasting as the first non-commercial public television station in the state on September 16, 1957, from a shabby, WWII wooden barracks-type structure on the University of Minnesota Agricultural Campus. The studios and offices were moved in the 1960s to what was known as the Minnesota Statehood Centennial Memorial Building for Education Television, at 1640 Como Avenue in Saint Paul. (Incidentally, that building housed another Twin Cities commercial television station, WUCW, channel 23, from 1989 to 2018.) KTCA's first program was Exploring Science. A second station, KTCI (channel 17), was launched on May 4, 1965. Channel 17 was originally assigned to the Tedesco Brothers in the early 1950s to be a commercial station, WCOW-TV, affiliated with the DuMont Television Network, but that station never made it to air. In 1967, KTCA became the first educational television station in the United States to broadcast in color. In 1976, the station changed its corporate name to Twin Cities Public Television.

On September 16, 1999, the stations began their first digital television broadcasts, 10 years after moving to 172 4th Street East in downtown Saint Paul. In 2000, KTCA and KTCI were rebranded as tpt2 and tpt17, paving the way for the larger family of digital broadcast services to come. In 2002, TPT became the first broadcaster in Minnesota to launch a channel, tptHD, fully devoted to high-definition programming, and in 2004 the organization launched a full-time digital channel, tptMN, devoted entirely to local and regional programs.

In December 2005, the organization began distributing many of its productions online, making programs available through iTunes, Google Video, and Yahoo! Podcasts among others. Its website features streaming video as well as video podcasts. In 2007, TPT began offering Video-On-Demand (VOD) through local cable providers.

During the summer of 2015, a new name and logo, "Twin Cities PBS", was introduced, before debuting on air on September 30, 2015. The rebrand included an updated version of the TPT logo that had been used since 2000, by Minnesota design agency Capsule.

On August 17, 2026, Twin Cities PBS announced that it would rebrand as Minnesota PBS effective September 1, alongside KSMQ-TV in Austin, Minnesota.

== Productions ==
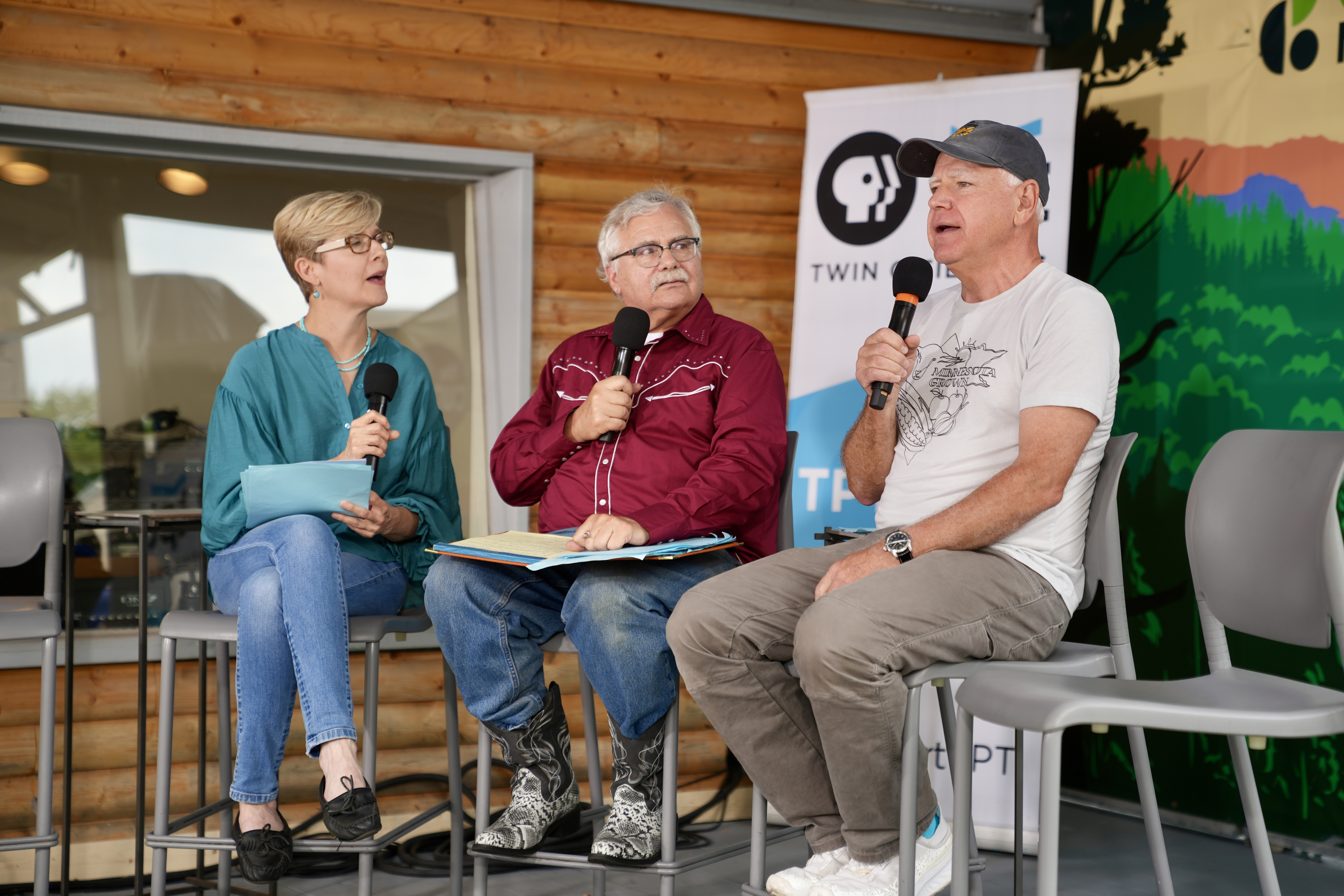
Live taping of Almanac at the 2025 Minnesota State Fair

TPT is one of the few public television organizations that regularly produces programs for the national PBS schedule. Major productions include:

- Grant Wood's America (1983)
- Alive from Off Center (1985–1996)
- Hoop Dreams (1995)
- Liberty! The American Revolution (November 23–25, 1997; June 21 – July 26, 2004)
- The Nine Steps To Financial Freedom (December 5, 1998)
- The Courage to Be Rich (1999)
- Jane Goodall: Reason for Hope (October 27, 1999)
- American Photography: A Century of Images (October 13, 1999)
- Transistorized (November 8, 1999)
- Organizing from the Inside out with Julie Morgansterm (August 12, 2000)
- American High (April 4, 2001)
- The Road to Wealth (August 6, 2001)
- Seth Eastman: Painting the Dakota (2002)
- Benjamin Franklin (November 19–20, 2002)
- Suze Orman: The Laws of Money, The Lessons of Life (March 2, 2003)
- The Forgetting: A Portrait of Alzheimer's (January 21, 2004)
- The Money Book for the Young, Fabulous and Broke (2005)
- The New Medicine (2006)
- Out North – MNLGBTQ History (2017)

In addition, TPT has produced the children's science series:

- Newton's Apple – The first major children's science show (October 15, 1983 – January 3, 1998)
- DragonflyTV (January 19, 2002 – January 31, 2009; June 1, 2014 – August 24, 2014)
- SciGirls – A show that demonstrates the scientific method and inclusive future for science. (February 11, 2010 – June 23, 2023)
- Hero Elementary – An animated series featuring superhero kids who solve problems using scientific concepts (June 1, 2020 – January 4, 2022)
- Skillsville (March 3, 2025 – April 19, 2026)

Other series included Right on the Money. Make: television, produced in collaboration with Make magazine, premiered on PBS stations and the web in 2009.

TPT also regularly produces programs exclusively for and about Minnesota and the surrounding region. Its Friday night public-affairs program Almanac has aired weekly for more than 35 years. Other significant local productions include numerous concerts with the Saint Paul Chamber Orchestra, Minnesota: A History of the Land (2005), North Star: Minnesota's Black Pioneers (2004), the series Don't Believe The Hype (10 seasons), Seth Eastman: Painting the Dakota (2001), Death of the Dream: Farmhouses in the Heartland (2000), the series Tape's Rolling, Wacipi-Powow (1995), Lost Twin Cities (1995), Dakota Exile (1995), The Dakota Conflict (1993), Iron Range: A People's History (1994), and How to Talk Minnesotan (1992).

== The Minnesota Channel ==
The Minnesota Channel (TPT MN) is a full-time statewide network originating at Twin Cities Public Television and carried on digital subchannels of nine stations. It features programming related to Minnesota and Wisconsin, including ethnic and public-affairs programming.

In 2002, TPT began setting aside time on KTCI for the "Minnesota Channel", an evening dedicated to local and regional related programming, which expanded to a full-time digital subchannel on September 16, 2004. The Minnesota Channel was expanded region-wide in Minnesota and North Dakota in February 2007.

== Technical information ==
=== Subchannels ===
Both stations' signals are multiplexed:

Subchannels of KTCA-TV (ATSC 1.0)
Subchannel	Res.	Short name	Programming
2.1	1080i	MNPBS	PBS
2.2	480i	MNCH	Minnesota Channel
2.3	480i	MNLIFE	PBS
2.4	720p	MNKIDS	PBS Kids
2.5	720p	MNREADY	24/7 Weather

Subchannels of KTCI-TV (ATSC 3.0)
Subchannel	Res.	Short name	Programming
2.1	1080p	MNPBS	PBS
2.2	1080p	MNCH	Minnesota Channel
2.3	1080p	MNLIFE	PBS
2.4	1080p	MNKIDS	PBS Kids
2.5	1080p	MNREADY	24/7 Weather

KTCA-DT and KTCI-DT began broadcasting on channels 34 and 16 respectively on September 16, 1999.

=== Analog-to-digital conversion ===
TPT rearranged its on-air lineup on February 18, 2009. It continued to use both KTCA-DT and KTCI-DT's transmitters, but shut down the separate tpt17 service and unified all over-the-air channels as virtual subchannels of 2. TPT's stations shut down their analog signals at 9 a.m. on June 12, 2009, the date on which full-power television stations in the United States transitioned from analog to digital broadcasts by federal mandate. The station's digital channel allocations post-transition are as follows:

- KTCA-TV shut down its analog signal, over VHF channel 2; the station's digital signal remained on its pre-transition UHF channel 34, using virtual channel 2.1.
- KTCI-TV shut down its analog signal, over UHF channel 17; the station's digital signal remained on its pre-transition UHF channel 16, using virtual channel 2.3.

The then-new channel lineup was originally meant to coincide with the DTV transition. When the transition's mandatory cutoff was delayed, TPT announced the new lineup would still go forward and it would continue its analog service until the new cutoff. Until then, KTCA-TV simulcast tpt 2 and KTCI-TV simulcast tptLife on their analog signals.

=== Translators ===
- K16MA-D Frost (translates KTCA-TV)
- K21KF-D Frost (translates KTCI-TV)
- K22MY-D Jackson (translates KTCA-TV)
- K26CS-D St. James (translates KTCA-TV)
- K29IE-D St. James (translates KTCI-TV)
