= The Adventures of Edward the Less =

- Also known as: Edward the Less
- Genre: Fantasy; Parody
- Created by: Patrick Brantseg; Bill Corbett; Kevin Murphy; Michael J. Nelson; Paul Chaplin
- Written by: Patrick Brantseg; Bill Corbett; Kevin Murphy; Michael J. Nelson; Paul Chaplin
- Voices of: Bill Corbett; Kevin Murphy; Michael J. Nelson; Paul Chaplin; Mary Jo Pehl; Patrick Brantseg
- Narrated by: Mike Dodge
- Composers: Michael J. Nelson; Kevin Murphy
- Country of origin: United States
- Original language: English
- No. of seasons: 1
- No. of episodes: 13

Production
- Executive producer: Sean Redlitz
- Producers: Rachel Gibbs; Alissa Gordon; Laurissa James
- Running time: 2–5 minutes

Original release
- Network: Sci-Fi Channel
- Release: 2001 – 2001

The Adventures of Edward the Less is a 2001 animated fantasy comedy web series created by the former cast of the popular cult TV series Mystery Science Theater 3000 for SciFi.com, the Sci Fi Channel website. It tells the story of Edward, a Pudge who reluctantly embarks on a quest to destroy a magic token before it falls into the hands of the evil Dark Person.

== Plot ==
Edward the Less is a Pudge, a race of short and merry people who spend their days in the Pudgelands dancing, eating horrible food, singing inane songs and whistling. But Edward is frustrated with the overly merry lifestyle and dreams of seeking out a magical city island he has read about, which includes tall people, skyscrapers, pizza and people who ride around in yellow cars and push each other around. Edward decides to leave his hamlet of Pushington Downs, along with his faithful sidekick Soapwort McFuggletoes. During their journey, the duo come into possession of a magic token, which they are forced to destroy so it will not fall into the hands of the evil Dark Person.

== Cast ==
- Bill Corbett as Edward
- Kevin Murphy as Soapwort McFuggletoes
- Michael J. Nelson as The Noble One
- Paul Chaplin as Primatene (credited as Paul Schersten)
- Mary Jo Pehl as Ariadrina and The Lorekeeper
- Patrick Brantseg as Walt
- Mike Dodge as The Narrator

== Production ==
Following the cancellation of the cult comedy Mystery Science Theater 3000, performers and writers from the show Patrick Brantseg, Bill Corbett, Kevin Murphy, Michael J. Nelson and Paul Chaplin conceived and created Edward the Less. The miniseries is a parody of the fantasy genre in general, but most especially of J. R. R. Tolkien's The Lord of the Rings; Edward the Less was inspired in large part by the release of The Lord of the Rings film trilogy, the first film of which was also released in 2001. The story structure, as well as specific characters and elements of Edward the Less, are directly inspired by The Lord of the Rings, including the Pudges, which are spoofs of Hobbits, and the Dark Person, which is inspired by the Dark Lord Sauron.

Michael Nelson created the music, much of which is comical music Nelson considers "a parody of real music." Some of the music was composed on ACID Pro, a digital audio workstation by Sony Creative Software. Mystery Science Theater 3000 alum Mary Jo Pehl joined the creators in voicing the characters, and Mike Dodge, who served as an MST3K writer for a few seasons, was cast as the voice-over narrator. Kevin Murphy said producing and recording Edward the Less went very smoothly because the whole crew had worked together before and quickly found their old sense of comedic timing again.

Artists Rich Larson and Steve Fastner, who have worked together on several works of fantasy art including comics and book cover illustrations, created the animated drawings for Edward the Less. Larson worked with the show creators on Mystery Science Theater 3000: The Movie and was looking forward to illustrating Edward the Less because he was often critical of Lord of the Rings illustrations and looked forward to spoofing them.

Edward the Less was written in three parts, in part because fantasy epic stories are usually structured as trilogies similar to The Lord of the Rings. Kevin Murphy said it was also structured this way so that the story could be easily continued if SciFi.com wanted more episodes beyond the original 13 they ordered. Murphy felt Edward the Less could work well in other media, including a book or a radio series in the style of The Hitchhiker's Guide to the Galaxy.
