= Mystery Science Theater 3000: The Movie =

- Theatrical release poster
- Directed by: Jim Mallon
- Screenplay by: Trace Beaulieu; Paul Chaplin; Bridget Jones; Jim Mallon; Kevin Murphy; Michael J. Nelson; Mary Jo Pehl
- Based on: Mystery Science Theater 3000 by Joel Hodgson
- Produced by: Jim Mallon
- Starring: Michael J. Nelson; Trace Beaulieu; Kevin Murphy; Jim Mallon
- Cinematography: Jeff Stonehouse
- Edited by: Bill Johnson
- Music by: Billy Barber
- Production companies: Gramercy Pictures; Best Brains
- Distributed by: Universal Pictures
- Release date: April 19, 1996
- Running time: 74 minutes
- Country: United States
- Language: English
- Budget: <$5 million
- Box office: $1 million

Mystery Science Theater 3000: The Movie is a 1996 American science fiction comedy film and a film adaptation of the television series Mystery Science Theater 3000, produced and set between the series' sixth and seventh seasons. It was distributed by Universal Pictures and Gramercy Pictures and produced by Best Brains.

The filmmakers dub a new comic narrative over the 1955 sci-fi film This Island Earth, editing out approximately 30 minutes of the original film.

== Plot ==
The film opens with mad scientist Dr. Clayton Forrester, working from an underground laboratory, explaining the premise of the film (and associated series). Mike Nelson and the robots Crow T. Robot and Tom Servo, along with Gypsy, are aboard the Satellite of Love high in Earth's orbit, when Forrester forces them to watch the film This Island Earth to break their wills; as in the television series, Mike, Crow and Tom riff the film as it plays.

The film-riffing scenes are book-ended and interspersed with short, unrelated sketches:

- In the introduction, Crow attempts to dig through the ship's hull to return to Earth.
- Crow and Tom dare Mike to drive the Satellite himself, but he ends up crashing into the Hubble Space Telescope.
- Tom reveals that he has an "interocitor" like that used in This Island Earth. The gang tries to use Tom's device to return to Earth, but they instead contact a Metalunan (the alien race from the film) who is unable to help them to figure out how to use it correctly but does accidentally repeatedly zap Tom's head with a laser beam.
- After This Island Earth finishes, Mike, Crow, and Tom are nowhere near broken and are having a party on the satellite. Furious at his failure, Forrester attempts to use his own interocitor to harm them, but only succeeds in transporting himself into the shower of the Metalunan previously seen.
- During the credits, the film breaks the fourth wall as the crew returns to the theater and riffs on MST3k: The Movie's ending credits.

== Cast ==
- Michael J. Nelson as Mike Nelson
- Trace Beaulieu as Crow T. Robot / Dr. Clayton Forrester
- Kevin Murphy as Tom Servo
- Jim Mallon as Gypsy
- John Brady as Benkitnorf

== Production ==
Mystery Science Theater 3000 (MST3K) launched on Minnesota station KTMA-TV by Joel Hodgson in 1988, and picked up for national broadcast by The Comedy Channel for more seasons the following year. After being renewed after the third season, the showrunners recognized that MST3K would likely stay around for some time, and tossed around the idea of a theatrical film. As suggested by producer Jim Mallon, one would enjoy a typical MST3K episode and its obscure references while watching in a large group rather than alone. They also had seen how Star Trek: The Next Generation had successfully made the leap from TV screens to film.

Hodgson had a contact with Paramount Pictures and began pitching the film idea as to tap Paramount's library, such as When Worlds Collide (1951). However, this deal fell apart when the studio wanted to explore the characters' backstories instead of heckling on movies. Among other distributors, the crew fell into discussions with Universal Pictures through Casey Silver, with support of a Universal lawyer that a was a big fan of the show and wanted to see Universal distribute it "under the radar", according to Mallon. An initial pitch for the film was to frame the host segments around the Mads attending a mad scientists convention in Las Vegas, where Dr. Forrestor would show off his experiment, including the film riffing, to its attendants, ending with Dr. Forrestor forcing the Satellite of Love out of orbit to crash into the convention but saved at the last moment by a kaiju. At this scale, the sets for the Satellite and other parts would need to be more expansive, a direction that Hodgson did not want to take, contributing to his departure from the show around 1995. Realizing this was likely too expansive for an approximately $2 million budget, and diverged greatly from the show's format, the crew revised the idea to be closer to the television format, primarily focused on the riffing with host segments interspersed.

With access to Universal's library, they screen many of their color film works and television shows before coming across This Island Earth. Kevin Murphy said of the selection of the film "It's a very earnest film, and yet when you look at its earnestness, it makes you laugh because of how silly it is." They wrote an early script for the show, and tested it as a live show with about 1,300 fans at the Uptown Theater in Minneapolis during the series' "ConventioCon ExpoFest-O-Rama" in 1994, with Universal executives in the audience. Based on the response, Universal agreed to distribute the film through Gramercy Pictures.

The MST3K started to fine-tune the script for the film based on the live show. They worked in host skits as part of the film's narrative since they did not have the usual need for commercial break bumpers, and instead developing reasons for the Satellite crew to leave the theater. Unlike Comedy Central or The Sci-Fi Channel which allowed MST3K nearly full freedom with their episode scripts, Universal and Gramercy were more involved in the script development. Obscure jokes, typical for an MST3K television episodes, had to be explained to executives, leading some to be cut fearing the audience would not get it. Further, the MST3K writers had to limit the number of references to some popular culture topics; an early version included a reference to The Beatles, but were told it would cost $100,000 to clear the licensing rights to use the name.

The film was shot away from the Best Brains corporate headquarters and studio in Eden Prairie, Minnesota, instead with the set pieces shot at Energy Park Studios in St. Paul, and the riffing at Paisley Park in Chanhassen. A combination of the movie's low budget and mandatory fees incorporated into the film's distribution, such as support for Dolby Stereo, required several adjustments to the sets to keep the production within budget. Following filming, Universal and Gramercy insisted on several cuts and reshoots, including deleting some of the host segments. According to Mallon, one of the more vocal executives behind these cuts was named Carr D'Angelo, leading to them creating a chainsaw prop for Crow with the name "Carr" on it in reference to the executive. They also had demands to cut the film under 90 minutes, leading to more cuts.

Among the deleted scenes included:

- At the beginning of the film, it was originally planned to have a new version of the "MST3K Love Theme" by Dave Alvin, but the song was reduced to an instrumental version over the end credits.
- To trim the film's duration, Gramercy ordered one of the host segments to be cut. In this scene, Mike and the bots hide out in the ship's storm shelter to avoid a meteor shower. The barrage of meteors threatens to damage the ship's oxygen supply, and Crow, Servo and Gypsy rush to save Mike's life.
- The ending was also changed – originally, the film's final moments depicted Mike and the bots exacting revenge on Forrester by hooking up Servo's interocitor to the video feed from the Hexfield Viewscreen and sending a Metalunan mutant (played by MST3K prop man and toolmaster Jef Maynard) to strangle the mad scientist. At the end, Crow goes back to the basement to plan another escape attempt, this time armed with the chainsaw that he found in Servo's room earlier in the film.
- The new theme song, cut scene and alternate ending were shown at the 1996 "Mystery Science Theater 3000 ConventioCon ExpoFest-O-Rama 2: Electric Bugaloo", but were not included on home media releases until the Shout! Factory Collector's Edition.

Promotion and marketing of the film also ran into problems. Their test audience in Los Angeles was overseen by Universal, who had selected an audience that the MST3K crew did not think best suited for the show; they spoofed this experience in a later episode skit involving Crow's script for a film "Earth versus Soup". Marketing was being run by Gramercy but they had sunk most of the funds into the other film on their roster, Barb Wire. As such, the film's release was more muted than they had expected. At this point, the crew were also struggling with their renewal negotiations with Comedy Central, which also created tension among the crew.

== Release ==
=== Box office ===
Mystery Science Theater 3000: The Movie was released on April 19, 1996, a month before the TV series ended its run on Comedy Central, in only 26 theaters, grossing $206,328, a $7,935 per theater average. It went on to gross $1,007,306.

=== Critical reception ===
The film received generally positive reviews from critics. On review aggregator website Rotten Tomatoes, the film holds an 80% rating, based on 56 reviews, with an average rating of 6.7/10. The site's consensus states: "Mystery Science Theater 3000: The Movie may be thin and uneven, but it's hilarious in enough of the right spots to do the show's big-screen transition justice."

== Home media ==
The film was released on VHS by MCA/Universal Home Video to rental outlets on October 1, 1996. The film was released for retail sales on April 8, 1997, on both VHS and LaserDisc formats. MST3K: The Movie was released on DVD in 1998 by Image Entertainment.

Universal re-released the DVD on May 6, 2008, through their Rogue Pictures subsidiary. The film is in anamorphic widescreen, and includes an upgraded Dolby Digital 5.1 soundtrack, with an alternate French dub that is noticeably different from the original English one, as many of the pop culture references that the show was famous for did not translate well overseas and had to be replaced.

It was announced on June 7, 2013, that Shout! Factory would be releasing Mystery Science Theater 3000: The Movie on a Blu-ray/DVD combo pack Collector's Edition. This release included, for the first time, the deleted scenes from the film.

== See also ==
- List of films featuring space stations
