= Meet Dave =

2008 American film by Brian Robbins

- Theatrical release poster
- Directed by: Brian Robbins
- Written by: Bill Corbett; Rob Greenberg
- Produced by: Jon Berg; David T. Friendly; Todd Komarnicki
- Starring: Eddie Murphy; Elizabeth Banks; Gabrielle Union; Scott Caan; Ed Helms; Kevin Hart
- Cinematography: J. Clark Mathis
- Edited by: Ned Bastille
- Music by: John Debney
- Production companies: Dune Entertainment; Regency Enterprises; Guy Walks Into a Bar; Friendly Films
- Distributed by: 20th Century Fox
- Release date: July 11, 2008
- Running time: 90 minutes
- Country: United States
- Language: English
- Budget: $60 million
- Box office: $50.7 million

Meet Dave is a 2008 American science fiction comedy film directed by Brian Robbins and written by Bill Corbett and Rob Greenberg. It stars Eddie Murphy in the title role, alongside Elizabeth Banks, Gabrielle Union, Ed Helms, Scott Caan and Kevin Hart. The film was released by 20th Century Fox on July 11, 2008, and was a box office bomb, grossing $50.7 million against a $60 million budget while receiving negative reviews from critics.

== Plot ==
A glowing orb flies through space, aiming for Earth's ocean, and is knocked off course by a satellite. In a New York City apartment, a boy named Josh Morrison notices the object heading towards him through his telescope and it lands in his fishbowl. He tells his mother, Gina, but she does not believe him. When Gina leaves his room, Josh sees the orb quickly absorb all of the water inside his fishbowl, so he takes it to his school presentation.

Approximately three months later, a mysterious fireball crash lands on the Liberty Island. It is revealed to be a spaceship, built to resemble its captain, controlled by 100 tiny humanoid aliens. The Captain pilots the "ship" from the command deck located in its head, with the help of his second-in-command Number 2, and researcher Number 3. The spaceship looks human and displays numerous superpowers, but the aliens do not know human ways. A superstitious cop named Dooley desperately searches for the alien, despite his partner Knox's doubt.

The aliens need to save their planet, Nil, from an energy crisis. They need salt, which they plan to drain from the ocean using the orb, so they have to recover the ball. After the ship is hit by Gina's car, Gina insists the Captain come to her home for breakfast. He tells her his name is Dave Ming Chang, based on a quick scan of common Earth names. The crew see their missing orb in a photograph of the science presentation. "Dave" goes to Josh's school where Josh tells him that the "rock" was taken by a "jerk". With Josh's help, Dave eventually takes the orb back from the bully.

As the crew (via Dave) spend so much time with Josh and Gina, they adopt Earth's culture, mannerisms and general laid-back attitude. They realise humans are more advanced than they originally thought. They observe humans displaying feelings and love, such as observing Gina's painting or a homeless man offering to share his blanket with Dave when he sleeps in a doorway. The Captain decides to cancel the plan because it would destroy life on Earth. Dooley tracks Dave down using the impression of his face found at the crash site and arrests him for a friendly interrogation. Believing that the Captain and the rest of the crew's changing behavior is ruining their mission, Number 2 takes command of the ship and imprisons the Captain. Under Number 2's command, Dave breaks out of the police station and attacks the police. Number 3, who has become infatuated with the Captain, becomes jealous of Gina. She first cooperates with Number 2 but then, on witnessing his violence, frees the Captain. Both are caught by Number 2 and expelled from the spaceship. The Captain apologizes to Number 3 for neglecting her and admits that he too loves her. In the meantime, Number 17, a young, fun-loving alien, jumps out of the ship while drunk from the alcohol Dave has imbibed. Back at the police station, Dooley discovers him in his coffee and asks him where Dave is going.

Number 2 takes Dave to the harbor, where he tries to throw the metal orb into the ocean, but is stopped by the Captain and Number 3, who managed to gain reentry back onto the ship. Number 4 convinces the rest of the crew that the real Captain is in charge again. Reinstated, he orders Number 2 to be stuck in the ship's "butt". The orb meanwhile slips out of Dave's hand and rolls into the ocean. The ship only has enough power to either retrieve it or return home. The Captain decides to save Earth and the rest of the crew agrees. The ball is retrieved and Dave powers down while Dooley and Knox catch up and point their guns at him. With no power, Dave's shields are disabled, leaving the crew defenseless. Josh and Gina try to tell the officers that Dave is harmless but Knox ignores them. Josh then grabs Knox's taser and recharges Dave. The Captain and Number 3 reveal themselves to the officers who stand down. The Captain says goodbye to Josh and Gina and Number 17 is returned to Dave by Dooley. About to fly away, a team from the FBI arrives and throws a net over Dave. While the FBI agents close in, "Dave's" crew evacuates to one of the ship's "lifeboat" shoes. It detaches and heads home to Nil, leaving behind the ship (and Number 2 indirectly). In the lifeboat, the Captain asks for Number 3's hand in marriage, she accepts and they kiss.

== Cast ==
- Eddie Murphy as Dave Ming Chang and The Captain / Number 1
- Elizabeth Banks as Gina Morrison
- Gabrielle Union as Number 3
- Ed Helms as Number 2 / Master Xaviax
- Marc Blucas as Mark Rhodes
- Scott Caan as Officer Dooley
- Kevin Hart as Number 17
- Yvette Nicole Brown as Betty, an Old Navy Saleswoman
- Mike O'Malley as Officer Stevie Knox
- Austyn Lind Myers as Josh Morrison
- Pat Kilbane as Number 4 / Johnny Dazzles
- Tariq Bah as Marcus Grill
- Miguel A. Núñez Jr. as Number 12
- Adam Tomei as Number 35
- Allisyn Ashley Arm as Nerdy Girl

== Production ==
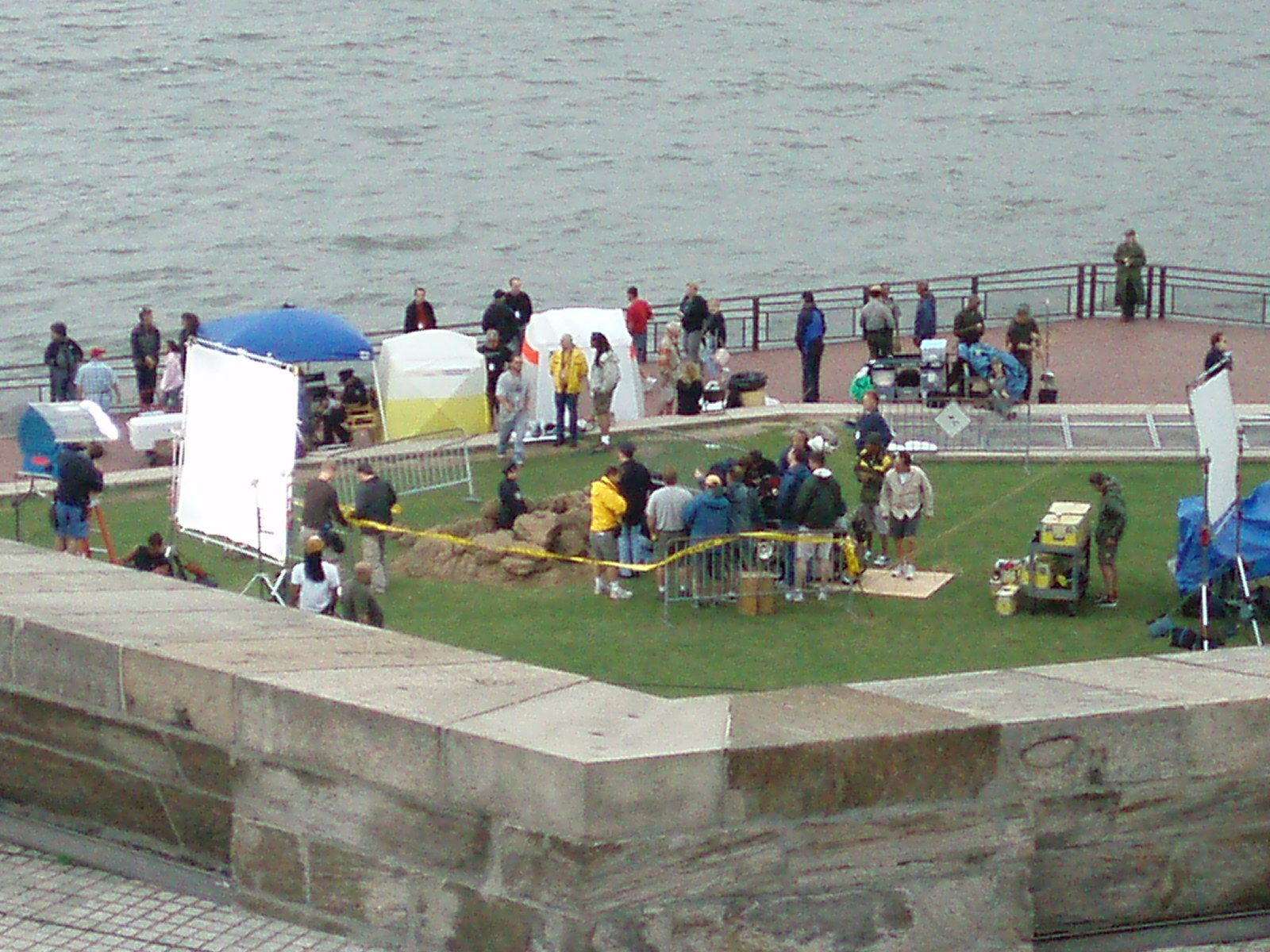
Film set at the Statue of Liberty in June 2007

Screenwriter Bill Corbett originally pitched the story for SciFi.com, the website for the Sci Fi Channel, which previously aired Mystery Science Theater 3000, where Corbett worked as a writer and actor. The concept was eventually dropped and Corbett, along with other MST3K alumni, instead developed the online mini-series The Adventures of Edward the Less for the site. Corbett later revived the idea for a movie and discussed it with friend and fellow writer Rob Greenberg, who would become his screenwriting partner for the project. Although both writers acknowledged several other "little people inside big people" movies had been made in the past, Corbett thought the aspect of an entire Star Trek like crew operating a human being bore some originality.

During filming, Meet Dave was transferred from Paramount Pictures (which released many of Murphy's early films) to 20th Century Fox (which released both Dr. Dolittle and its sequel).

Meet Dave was written under the title Starship Dave, but studio executives insisted on a title change in part because of the box-office underperformance and critical reception of The Adventures of Pluto Nash, a 2002 science-fiction comedy that also starred Eddie Murphy. Corbett said the executives also wanted the title changed because they felt having any semblance of science-fiction in the title would isolate a large percentage of audiences. Corbett unsuccessfully argued against the new title, which he described as "beyond generic" and said was repetitive of a comedy released earlier in the year called Meet Bill.

Although the project as it was originally conceived appealed to both children and slightly older audiences, the final script aimed for a much more solidly family-based audience. Corbett and Greenberg wrote the original draft and some subsequent drafts and, although they were given the sole writing credit, Corbett said other writers "have romped through the script as well," including one unnamed writer who spent one week adding material after the final draft was submitted. A large amount of improvising and rewriting was also done on the set, and Corbett and Greenberg had little creative control during filming. Corbett said most of the people they worked with were pleasant and some of the notes from the studio were helpful, but that Meet Dave ultimately suffered from a "too-many-cooks thing."

Filming was expected to begin in March 2007. As of early June, they were filming scenes at the Statue of Liberty in New York City. There was also some filming in early 2007 at an elementary school in Pasadena, California.

== Soundtrack ==
Meet Dave: Original Motion Picture Soundtrack

Film score by John Debney
- Released: July 18, 2008
- Genres: Soundtrack, film score
- Length: 42:54
- Label: Varèse Sarabande

The soundtrack album for the film was composed by John Debney and released by Varèse Sarabande. Debney recorded his score with the Hollywood Studio Symphony at the Newman Scoring Stage in February 2008.

== Release ==
Meet Dave began receiving criticism and hostility months before it was released, especially by die-hard film fans. Bill Corbett compared them to the Comic Book Guy character in The Simpsons. Rob Greenberg enjoyed reading the negative comments on the Internet Movie Database, whereas Corbett said he would "rather take an acid bath" than read them. Corbett, who did not see the final film until after it was widely released, said he did not know how the final result would come out:

Part of me is proud and wants to own this movie, promote it, generally celebrate it and look forward to all the possibilities that may emerge from the experience. And an equally real part of me wants to lock myself in a dark room for a month and pretend it never happened. Why the latter? Because the truth is that I had not a bit of control over the final product, and Hollywood does tend to suckify things. Often quite badly.

Eddie Murphy did not attend the Meet Dave premiere, claiming it was because he was working on the (subsequently delayed) comedy A Thousand Words—although Robbins, who had directed both films, did attend the premiere. Screenwriter Bill Corbett also missed the premiere, which he said was due to family plans, "not an act of protest, per se".

=== Box office ===
Meet Dave grossed $11.8 million in the United States and Canada and $38.8 million in other territories for a worldwide total of $50.7 million, against its production budget of $60 million.

The film opened on July 11, 2008, in 3,011 theaters in North America and grossed $5.3 million, ranking seventh at the box office. 20th Century Fox distribution executive Bert Livingston said, "It was a tough concept to get across. It's upsetting for all of us and for Eddie. He's very funny in this. Just not enough people came."

In its third weekend, it broke the record for the highest number of theater drops for a film in wide release, losing 2,523 theaters (77%). It held the record until Live by Night was dropped from 2,659 theaters (94.1%) in January 2017.

== Reception ==
=== Critical response ===
On Rotten Tomatoes, the film has an approval rating of 20% based on 102 reviews, with an average rating of 4.30/10. The site's critical consensus reads, "Easy gags and slack direction drag this occasionally clever alien-out-of-planet comedy down to unimaginative lows." On Metacritic, the film has a score of 43 out of 100, based on reviews from 26 critics, indicating "mixed or average reviews". Audiences polled by CinemaScore gave the film a grade "B" on scale of A to F.

Peter Travers of Rolling Stone gave the film a negative review and wrote: "Murphy, teaming again with his Norbit director Brian Robbins, is assuming we'll all line up for lazyass toilet jokes and pay for the privilege. Prove him wrong, people, please." Claudia Puig of USA Today wrote: "If only the movie had heeded its own advice and tried to be different from the standard formula. We might have enjoyed the powerful force of this big star and his gift for physical comedy if the movie offered fresh scenarios and fewer predictable jokes."

Joe Leydon of Variety gave it a positive review and wrote: "Aimed squarely at the same family audiences that flocked to Murphy's "Doctor Dolittle" comedies, this is a lightly amusing and surprisingly sweet Fox release."

=== Other response ===
The film's poor performance became a joke for comedians. Jay Leno said that the film's title was going to be changed to Meet Dave: At Blockbuster, insinuating that the movie should have been a straight-to-DVD release. In the also Fox-produced Family Guy episode "Friends of Peter G", during the "Mr. Booze" song number, Carl mentioned that since he started drinking, he has never left his couch and has seen every movie ever made. Meet Dave is the first movie called out, and Carl mentions he has seen it.

Bill Corbett said he would love to record a Meet Dave track on RiffTrax, a site featuring downloadable audio commentaries recorded by Mystery Science Theater 3000 alum Michael J. Nelson and other regular commentators, including Corbett. Corbett said the track was not likely to ever be recorded since comedies rarely work as spoofs. A reference to the film was included in the RiffTrax Presents commentary for Planet of the Apes recorded by Matthew J. Elliott (in which he suggested that the filmmaker's original intention had been to launch Charlton Heston's character into space inside a giant Eddie Murphy), as well as the commentary for The Day After Tomorrow recorded by Corbett and Kevin Murphy, in which Corbett claims the natural phenomena hitting Los Angeles were "almost as big a Hollywood disaster as Meet Dave's box office".

Eddie Murphy singled out Meet Dave as one of the worst movies he ever made.

=== Accolades ===
It was nominated for two Razzie Awards, Worst Actor (Eddie Murphy) and Worst Screen Couple (Eddie Murphy in Eddie Murphy).
