= WUCW =

Television station in Minneapolis

ATSC 3.0 station
- Minneapolis–Saint Paul, Minnesota; United States
- City: Minneapolis, Minnesota
- Channels: Digital: 22 (UHF); Virtual: 23
- Branding: The CW Twin Cities

Programming
- Affiliations: 23.1: The CW; for others, see § Technical information and subchannels

Ownership
- Owner: Sinclair Broadcast Group; (KLGT Licensee, LLC)

History
- First air date: September 22, 1982
- Former call signs: KTMA-TV (1982–1992); KLGT-TV (1992–1998); KMWB (1998–2006)
- Former channel numbers: Analog: 23 (UHF, 1982–2009)
- Former affiliations: Independent; (1982–1995); Spectrum (1982–1985); The WB (1995–2006)
- Call sign meaning: "Your CW"

Technical information
- Licensing authority: FCC
- Facility ID: 36395
- ERP: 790 kW
- HAAT: 436.2 m (1,431 ft)
- Transmitter coordinates: 45°3′44″N 93°8′22″W
- Translator(s): See § Translators

Links
- Public license information: Public file; LMS
- Website: thecwtc.com

WUCW (channel 23) is a television station licensed to Minneapolis, Minnesota, United States, serving the Twin Cities area as an affiliate of The CW. Owned by Sinclair Broadcast Group, the station maintains studios in the Pence Building on 8th Street and Hennepin Avenue in downtown Minneapolis, and its transmitter is located at the Telefarm site in Shoreview.

The station signed on as KTMA in 1982 with a mix of commercial and subscription programming. It transitioned to a full‑time independent station in 1985. During this period, it became famous for originating the cult cable television series Mystery Science Theater 3000, which began as a locally produced program. After going into bankruptcy in 1989, channel 23 was bought and repositioned as a family-oriented station, KLGT, which affiliated with The WB upon its 1995 launch. Sinclair purchased channel 23 in 1998 and changed the call letters to KMWB; it became WUCW upon the merger of The WB and UPN in 2006.

== History ==
=== The subscription television years ===
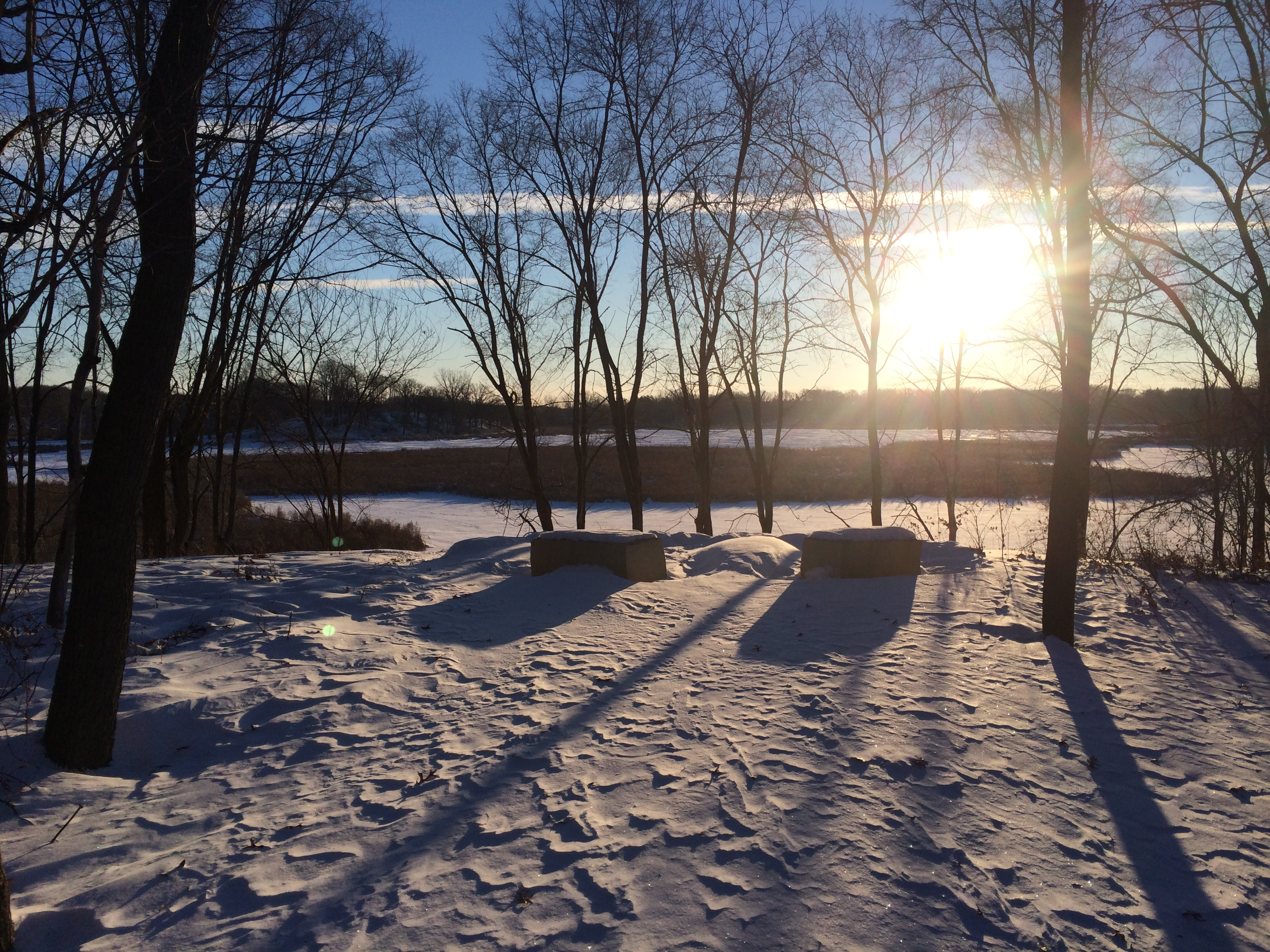
The purchase of Grass Lake (above) as public land by Ramsey County set back the construction of channel 23 for nearly a decade.

On April 16, 1966, Viking Television, Inc., a company organized by South St. Paul attorney and judge Irving W. Beaudoin, filed an application with the Federal Communications Commission (FCC) to build a new television station on channel 23 in Minneapolis. It was designated for hearing alongside a competing application from the Calvary Temple Evangelistic Association in late 1968; the church pulled out of the proceedings, and the Viking application was granted on November 24, 1969.

Little progress was made toward the construction of the station, which took the call letters KTMA-TV. In 1972, Viking presented a proposal for a studio and transmitter complex in Shoreview. However, residents feared the erection of a fourth mast in town after the collapse of a tower under construction killed seven workers the year before, and Ramsey County acquired the land for a park and nature center, creating a potential conflict of land uses. The loss of the site would further set back construction.

The prospect of subscription television (STV) had been thought of as early as the 1969 grant, when Viking held the local franchise to use the Phonevision system. However, a new generation of STV interests emerged in the mid-1970s. Viking signed a contract with American Subscription Television (SelecTV) and filed for subscription television authorization in October 1975.

Viking was still mired in tower site problems in 1976, when a second group filed to propose a subscription television station in the Twin Cities: Buford Television of Tyler, Texas, which applied for channel 29, only for a second application from Faith Broadcasting Network to compete against it. Meanwhile, Viking filed in March 1978 to sell the construction permit to Metropolitan Broadcasting Corporation; Metropolitan was in turn 20 percent owned by Universal Subscription Television, a subsidiary of Canadian media company CanWest Capital Corporation. This application was dismissed on June 22, 1979.

Viking had objected to Buford's channel 29 application when it was filed, but in February 1980, Beaudoin sold 80 percent of the KTMA construction permit to Buford for $475,000 in construction costs, which in turn cleared the way for Faith Broadcasting Network to build a station on channel 29. However, tower siting woes continued to snarl channel 23's attempts to get on air. The FCC in the late 1960s had required that the VHF television stations give room to new UHF stations that wished to broadcast from Shoreview, and KMSP-TV's mast was supposed to accommodate channel 23 and channel 29. However, when KSTP-TV obtained permission for a 274-foot (84 m) height extension to its tower (which also held WCCO-TV), only the KMSP Tower was left out because it could not be extended with the UHF stations on it. This prompted KMSP-TV to rescind the agreement, resulting in legal action.

It was only the resolution of the tower site issue that got the ball rolling for KTMA. More than 16 years after the permit was granted, channel 23 began broadcasting on September 22, 1982. In addition to advertiser-supported programs, KTMA carried Spectrum, the subscription service owned by Buford's Home Entertainment Network (HEN) division. The new service quickly secured valuable programming when it struck a deal to televise Minnesota Twins baseball and Minnesota North Stars hockey home games: the entire North Stars home slate and 50 Twins home games, packaged as "Spectrum Sports"—available for $19.95 a month or $29.90 along with the Spectrum movie service. The same year Buford launched KTMA, it sold a majority stake in HEN to United Cable.

At its peak, in May 1983, the service attracted 27,000 Twin Cities subscribers, making it the most successful of United Cable's three STV operations. Even then, United Cable was laying off 55 staff, cutting costs, and considering outsourcing its movie programming to Oak Industries (owners of ON TV). That summer, United agreed to buy Buford's 80 percent ownership of KTMA for $7.5 million while also writing down the Home Entertainment Network division and putting the three STV systems on the market.

As a sports service, Spectrum in the Twin Cities never reached the intended subscriber figures, prompting profits to fall far short of expectations for the Twins. Further, a federal judge had ruled against the Twins and North Stars pooling their broadcast rights in the Spectrum deal after WCCO-TV sued on antitrust charges. (Sports telecasts continued while the case was being appealed; after Spectrum's demise, the United States Court of Appeals for the Eighth Circuit found in the teams' favor.) In August 1985, the Twins and North Stars opted not to renew their Spectrum rights deal, a decision that sounded the death knell for the service, already down to just 13,000 subscribers. The movie service ended September 29, 1985, while Spectrum Sports concluded with the final game of the Twins season on October 6.

=== Independent KTMA ===
Jim (Mallon) got the job at KTMA. And it was all subterfuge. I mean, he brought me out there pretty much telling that the reason to have this job (is)... we have access to tools and we can do anything we want with them. That was the appeal to me – we could make a TV show and we could actually get it on the air.

— Kevin Murphy, on joining KTMA in 1987

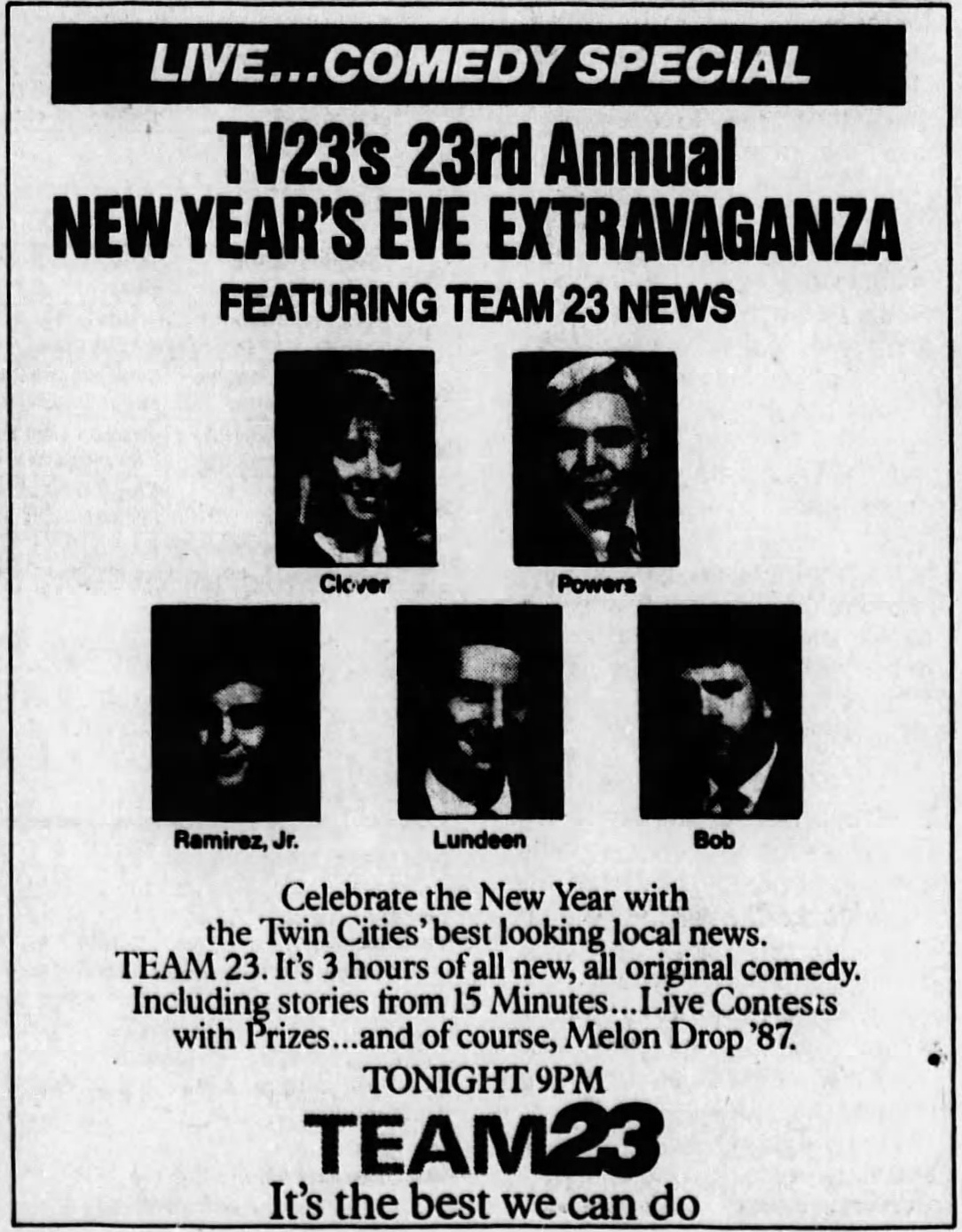
"Team23: It's the best we can do." A December 1987 advertisement for KTMA's 23rd Annual New Year's Eve Extravaganza, with Kevin Murphy as "reporter"/emcee Bob (Bagadonuts).

KTMA, still on the market when Spectrum closed, adopted a format of music videos programmed by local radio station KTWN. K-Twin Communications, owner of KTWN, made an $11 million offer to United Cable to purchase channel 23 outright. United rejected the bid and was reported to have accepted a $12 million offer from an Atlanta-based group. In the end, KTMA-TV Acquisition Corporation, owned by general manager Donald H. O'Connor, bought the entirety of the station—including Beaudoin's stake—for $13.8 million. O'Connor purchased another $2.5 million in equipment and changed KTMA to a more traditional general entertainment station, acquiring a number of older syndicated programs such as The Andy Griffith Show and Laurel and Hardy. A late 1986 billboard campaign centered around Elvira's Movie Macabre ended prematurely after the station received a dozen complaints over the slogan "features that will scare you to death". The majority of complaints over the billboard came from Farmington, where their city council also lodged a complaint to KTMA. One programming tradition began on New Year's Eve 1986: TV23's 23rd Annual New Year's Eve Extravaganza, a live comedy special emceed by station stagehand Kevin Murphy as "Bob Bagadonuts" culminating with a melon drop at midnight from the station's rooftop; this special was revisited in 1987, 1988 and 1989.

Despite a major $1.2 million marketing campaign at the relaunch, after the station was acquired, the station was only moderately successful at attracting viewers and revenue from commercial advertising. By February 1988, KTMA's ratings were still only half that of KITN-TV, which had become the Twin Cities area's other major UHF independent. The first signs of financial trouble also occurred that year: KTMA had to temporarily stop carrying some programs in August because it needed to refinance to pay its syndicators in a timely fashion. That same year, attempts were made at creating locally produced shows: to fill a hole in the Saturday night line-up, the station created Saturday Night at Ringside, a multi-hour block of professional wrestling programming hosted by Mick Karch, and a late-night talk show, Sports Week with Stretch and Z, also was created.

Late 1988 brought two debuts, one ambitious and one low-key. On December 14, 1988, O'Connor announced the formation of the Minnesota Independent Network, which would unite KTMA with KXLI (channel 41) in St. Cloud and KXLT-TV (channel 47) in Rochester; low-power TV stations owned by Red River TV in Bemidji (K26AC), Brainerd, and Grand Rapids; and several additional low-power stations to be leased or built at Alexandria, Donnelly/Herman, Park Rapids, and Austin. The St. Cloud station was also slated under the proposal to move its tower northwest toward Sauk Centre and change to channel 19. The Minnesota Independent Network would give KTMA and KXLI the regional circulation necessary to compete with other Twin Cities-market stations for viewers and programming rights. Further, KTMA would become KMIN.

The programming at KTMA was bottom-basin. Our prime-time headliner was Love, American Style paired with Hawaii Five-O, and we had the worst movie library imaginable.

— Jim Mallon

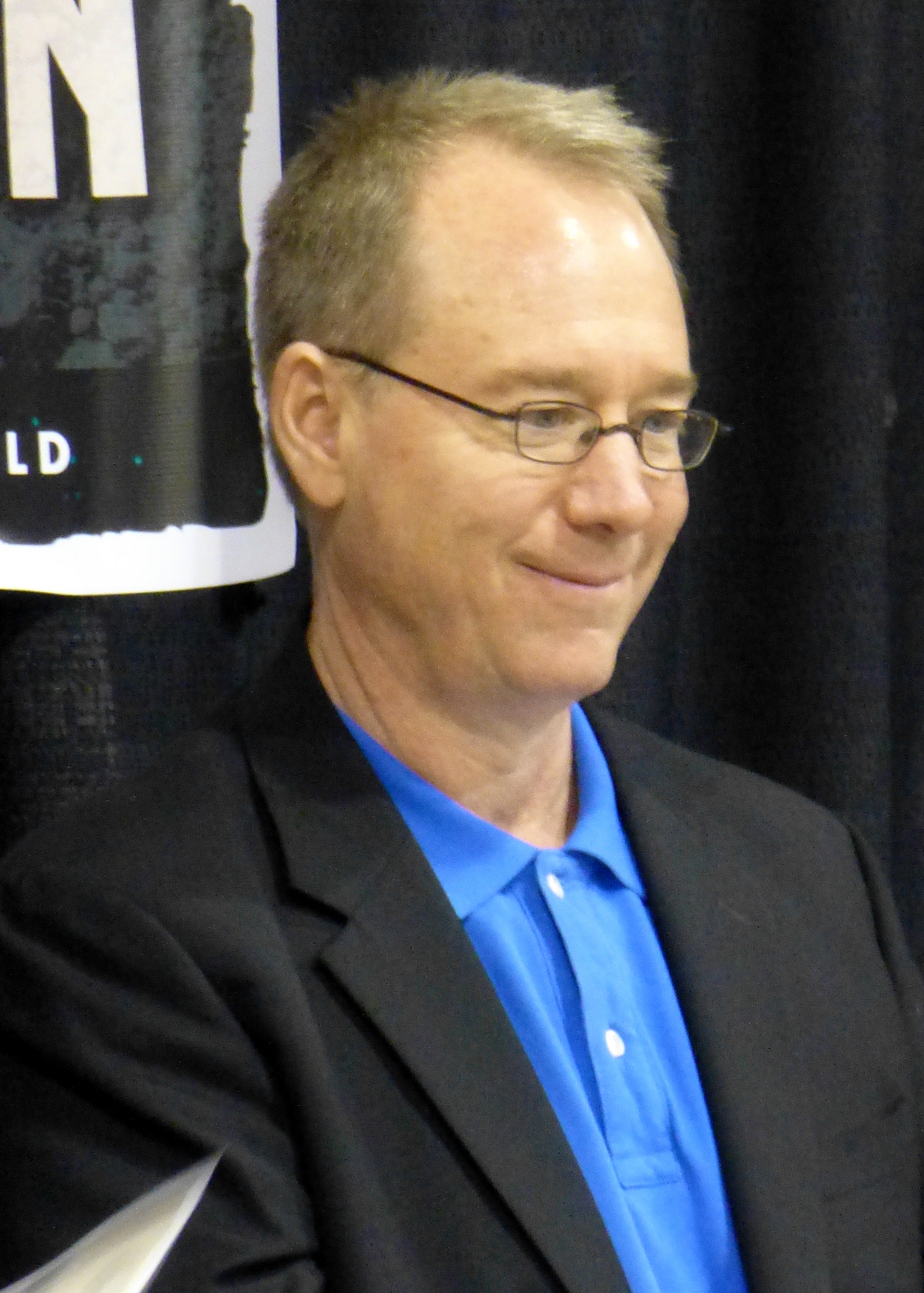
A standup comedian, inventor and prop comic, Joel Hodgson created the cult comedy series Mystery Science Theater 3000 for KTMA in late 1988.

The other debut came with less bombast but cemented KTMA's place in popular culture. As production manager Jim Mallon sought to fill a gap in the Sunday night line-up, he talked to his contacts in the local comedy community and ended up meeting Joel Hodgson, who had a warehouse in the same building as office space Mallon was using at the time. After a successful lunch meeting with Mallon to produce a new locally produced program for KTMA, Hodgson created Mystery Science Theater 3000 (also known under the abbreviated title MST3K), which began in November 1988. The show quickly attracted the involvement of Kevin Murphy, who had been an associate of Mallon dating back to his horror film project Blood Hook, performing multiple tasks from camera operator to show writer to set builder. Hodgson recruited local comedians Josh Weinstein and Trace Beaulieu as his co-stars; owing to the show's low budget, Weinstein and Beaulieu were only paid $25 per episode. A phone line Mallon established specifically for MST3K viewers netted such a favorable response that KTMA increased their show order from 13 episodes to 21. Unlike all future iterations of the show, the jokes provided by Hodgson and company during the course of a movie were ad libbed with a production cycle of less than 24 hours.

As MST3K grew, the Minnesota Independent Network collapsed. At the start of July 1989, O'Connor told a St. Cloud radio station that KTMA and the owner of KXLI and KXLT (which had gone silent awaiting the network's launch) had "bigger fish to fry" and blamed the complexity of the arrangement for scuttling the plan. The nature of his remarks was explained at the end of the month, when the station filed for Chapter 11 bankruptcy protection, with O'Connor noting that KTMA had been undercapitalized from the moment he had purchased it. Presaging the fate of MST3K in the years to come, KTMA ended production of the show after the June 1, 1989, season finale; the second issue of the show's fan club newsletter included a direct appeal to KTMA to reconsider. Hodgson and Mallon purchased MST3K's intellectual property under the production company Best Brains, Inc., along with a new studio in Eden Prairie. The Comedy Channel—recently established as an extension of HBO by Time Inc.—picked up the program as part of a $50 million launch campaign. MST3K ran on the network, later renamed Comedy Central, for seven years before moving to the Sci-Fi Channel for its final three seasons from 1997 to 1999.

Despite the failure of MIN to emerge, KTMA showed up in St. Cloud and Rochester anyway when new owners of KXLI and KXLT opted to simulcast channel 23 after returning to the air in 1990. The station, however, remained in bankruptcy for more than two years. Even during bankruptcy, the station moved from its original studios on Kennedy Street to a facility on Como Avenue as 1989 ended. It was not until the fall of 1991 that two groups emerged seeking to buy the station out of Chapter 11 bankruptcy, at the same time that the court-appointed trustee fired O'Connor in a cost-cutting effort. The successful bidder, Lakeland Group Television, was headed by Linda Rios Brook, who had resigned from her position as general manager of KARE—reportedly over her conservative religious beliefs—and planned to reposition the station with Christian programs.

=== Seeing the "Sonlight" ===
After plans to use the KSON call letters fell through, the station relaunched as KLGT, a family- and Christian-oriented independent, in March 1992.

After the new format achieved low ratings, Rios Brook changed tack in late 1993. The dove that had formed part of the logo was dropped, and the format was shifted. KLGT picked up a package of 14 Twins games previously aired by KITN in 1994; they had been jettisoned by channel 29 due to increasing commitments to Fox network programming. Later that year, channel 23 added games from the NBA's Minnesota Timberwolves. The sports expansion was the first in a series of moves that boosted channel 23's visibility. On January 11, 1995, KLGT became a launch affiliate of The WB; it simultaneously debuted a unique news experiment, News of Your Choice, in partnership with WCCO-TV. (A trial run had taken place the previous August.) That station produced a second 10 p.m. newscast featuring an alternate mix of stories for channel 23 and encouraged viewers to switch between the two programs; the program was dropped at the end of the year in response to a collapse in ratings for WCCO's newscasts.

=== KMWB and WUCW ===
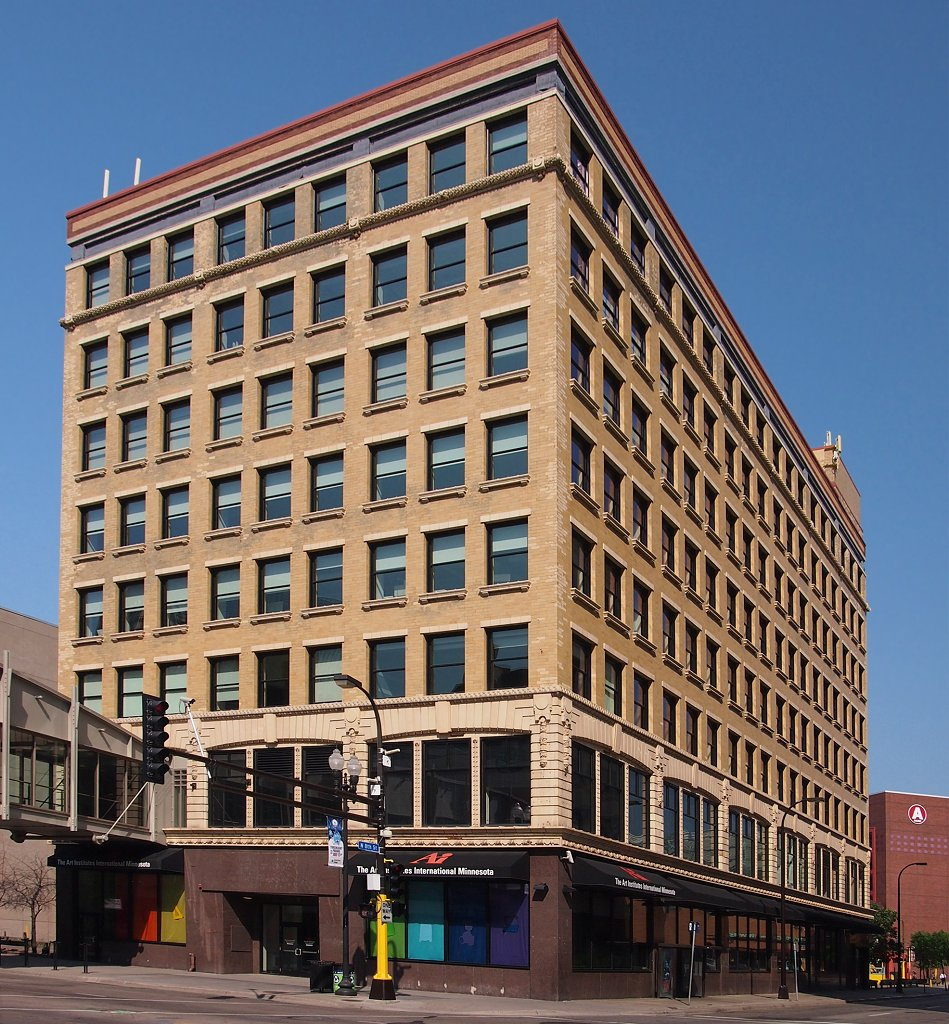
Since 2018, WUCW's studios have been located in the Pence Automobile Company Building.

In late 1997, Sinclair Broadcast Group entered into a deal to purchase KLGT for $52.5 million—a far cry from the $3.3 million spent to acquire it six years prior. The call letters were changed in November 1998 to KMWB, reflecting the state and network affiliation. The Timberwolves continued on channel 23 and KARE until they consolidated their over-the-air broadcasts with WFTC in 2001.

In 2006, The WB and UPN merged to create The CW. The UPN affiliate in the Twin Cities market, WFTC, was owned by Fox Television Stations; none of its UPN affiliates were chosen for the network's launch, and it set up MyNetworkTV for them and other stations that would not join The CW. On May 2, 2006, Sinclair Broadcast Group signed an affiliation agreement with The CW for the company's eight WB affiliates, including KMWB, to join the network. In preparation for the affiliation switch, KMWB changed its call sign to WUCW, planning to market itself as "Your CW"; as Minneapolis and St. Paul are on the line separating west "K" and east "W" calls, the station was able to switch to a "W"-prefixed call.

In January 2018, WUCW moved out of its longtime Como Avenue studios, which had been built for Twin Cities Public Television in 1960, and moved to the 7th floor of the Pence Building at 800 Hennepin Avenue in downtown Minneapolis. The studios were then sold to the Minnesota State Fair.

WUCW served as the over-the-air home of Minnesota United FC in 2021 and 2022. (Note: All Major League Soccer local television rights agreements ended after 2022 to make way for MLS's 10-year deal with Apple.) In the first season, the station was scheduled to air 19 matches, all simulcasts from Bally Sports North. To accommodate scheduling conflicts on Bally Sports North, WUCW aired five Minnesota Timberwolves games in April and May 2021 under the branding "Bally Sports Extra on The CW Twin Cities". In April 2022, WUCW aired two Minnesota Twins games and a Minnesota Wild game. Since 2023, WUCW has served as the home of the St. Paul Saints of Minor League Baseball.

Although WUCW does not presently air any newscasts, the station airs weeknight weather updates that are produced by sister station KEYE-TV in Austin, Texas, and presented by KEYE's chief meteorologist Chikage Windler.

== Technical information and subchannels ==
The station's ATSC 1.0 channels are carried on the multiplexed signals of other Twin Cities television stations:

Subchannels provided by WUCW (ATSC 1.0)
Subchannel	Res.	Short name	Programming	ATSC 1.0 host
23.1	1080i	The CW	The CW	KSTP-TV
23.2	480i	Comet	Comet	WFTC
23.3	480i	Charge!	Charge!	WCCO-TV
23.4	480i	ROAR	Roar	WCCO-TV
23.5	480i	Rewind	Rewind TV	KARE
23.6	480i	Antenna	Antenna TV	WFTC

On August 16, 2023, WUCW became the ATSC 3.0 (NextGen TV) host station for the Twin Cities. It broadcasts from a tower at the Telefarm Towers in Shoreview, Minnesota.

Subchannels of WUCW (ATSC 3.0)
Subchannel	Res	Short name	Programming
4.1	1080p	WCCO	CBS (WCCO-TV)
5.1	1080p	KSTP	ABC (KSTP-TV)
9.1	1080p	KMSP	Fox (KMSP-TV)
11.1	1080p	KARE	NBC (KARE)
23.1	1080p	WUCW	The CW
23.10	1080p	T2	T2
23.11		PBTV	Pickleballtv
23.20		GMLOOP	GameLoop

Subchannel broadcast with digital rights management
Subchannel streamed via the Internet

=== Analog-to-digital conversion ===
WUCW (like most Sinclair-owned television stations) ended regular programming on its analog signal, over UHF channel 23, on February 17, 2009, the original target date on which full-power television stations in the United States were to transition from analog to digital broadcasts under federal mandate (which was later pushed back to June 12, 2009). The station's digital signal remained on its pre-transition UHF channel 22.

As part of the SAFER Act, WUCW kept its analog signal on the air for 30 days to inform viewers of the digital television transition through a loop of public service announcements from the National Association of Broadcasters.

=== Translators ===
The broadcast signal of WUCW is also extended by way of six digital translators, owned by local translator associations, in central and southern Minnesota:

- Alexandria: K26CL-D
- Frost: K23FY-D
- Jackson: K28OI-D
- St. James: K34JX-D
- Walker: K35KH-D (main subchannel only)
- Willmar: K14LF-D
