= Mike Nelson's Movie Megacheese =

2000 book by Michael J. Nelson

- Author: Michael J. Nelson
- Genre: Non-fiction
- Publisher: HarperEntertainment
- Publication date: 2000
- ISBN: 0-380-81467-6

Mike Nelson's Movie Megacheese is the first book by Michael J. Nelson, published in 2000 by HarperEntertainment, an imprint of HarperCollins publishers.

The book is a series of essays about "cheesy" films. Some of the essays originally appeared in Home Theater and Entertainment@Home magazines. Prior to the book, Nelson was head writer of Mystery Science Theater 3000 for ten years, as well as starring as Mike Nelson for the final five-and-a-half seasons the show. He has published two follow-up books, Mike Nelson's Mind Over Matters and Mike Nelson's Death Rat!.

== Sections ==
The book is separated into nine sections:

=== Annnnd Action! ===
This covers brainless action films, including Volcano, Action Jackson, Independence Day, and the works of Jean-Claude Van Damme.

=== Wild Thangs ===
This one chooses films vaguely tied together by an animal of some sort: Mighty Joe Young, Anaconda, the Batman films, and the Matt LeBlanc opus Ed.

=== TeeVee ===
The aptly titled “TeeVee” section covers, well, TV: Baywatch, Judge Judy, the Food Network, Hercules: The Legendary Journeys, and the Matt LeBlanc opus Friends.

=== Science Friction ===
Everything from Star Trek to The Postman to the Matt LeBlanc opus Lost In Space. The chapter also heavily discusses in a tongue-in-cheek manner (as a running commentary throughout the various sections) the then-relatively new DVD technology.

=== The Five Families (Plus Two) ===
A whole chapter devoted to Hollywood's movers and shakers: The Arquettes (David, Patricia, Rosanna, and Alexis), The Baldwins, The Culkins (Macaulay and Kieran), The Dillon Brothers (Matt and Kevin), The Sheen/Estevez (Martin, Charlie, Joe and Emilio), The Penn Brothers (Sean and Chris), and, of course, The Wayans. Matt LeBlanc does not make an appearance in this chapter.

=== Chik Flix ===
In a particularly amusing chapter, Nelson dresses in drag to rent My Best Friend's Wedding, as well as Her Alibi, The Mirror Has Two Faces, Stepmom, The Bridges of Madison County, and the Nora Ephron/Meg Ryan canon.

=== The Legends ===
Brando. Joe Eszterhas. Andrew McCarthy. Bruce Willis. And Top. Carrot Top. These are The Legends.

=== Very Odds ‘n’ Ends ===
A catch-all chapter documenting The Craft, Date with an Angel, My Demon Lover, Patch Adams, Spring Break, Ishtar, and Waterworld.

=== Mega-Megacheese ===
The final chapter only has two entries: The Blair Witch Project and Mystery Science Theater 3000: The Movie.

== Publication information ==
- Mike Nelson's Movie Megacheese. Michael J. Nelson. HarperEntertainment, 2000. ISBN 0-380-81467-6.
