= Paul Chaplin =

American writer and comedian

- Born: Paul Schersten
- Citizenship: American
- Education: Hubert H. Humphrey Institute of Public Affairs
- Occupation(s): Writer, comedian

Paul Chaplin (born Paul Schersten) is an American writer and comedian, known for his work on the television series Mystery Science Theater 3000, for which he wrote and played the recurring characters of an Observer, Ned the Nanite, Pitch the Demon, and Ortega, along with several other bit roles.

== Early years ==
After earning his master's degree from the Hubert H. Humphrey Institute of Public Affairs, Schersten became a community organizer in Saint Paul, Minnesota. After finding little reward in his work he decided to pursue a career in comedy. It was during this time that Schersten took the stage surname Chaplin.

== Mystery Science Theater 3000 ==
While working the comedy club circuit in Minneapolis, Chaplin met Michael J. Nelson and Mary Jo Pehl. During the third season of MST3K, Nelson approached Chaplin and asked him about becoming a writer on Mystery Science Theater 3000 (MST3K). Nelson tested Chaplin by giving him ten minutes of footage from the movie Daddy-O, which Chaplin was to take home and give the "MST3K treatment". Chaplin passed the test with "flying colors", and was hired by Best Brains as a writer.

During his tenure on MST3K, Chaplin portrayed several characters in addition to his writing duties, most notably an Observer, Pitch the Demon (originally portrayed in the movie Santa Claus), Ned the Nanite, and Ortega (originally portrayed in the movie The Incredibly Strange Creatures Who Stopped Living and Became Mixed-Up Zombies).

== Work since MST3K ==
Since MST3K ended its eleven-year run in 1999, Chaplin has collaborated with his former MST3K colleagues on projects such as Edward the Less and Timmy Big Hands, and has also written for NPR and Elysian Fields Quarterly.

In the 2007 MST3K online animated series, Chaplin provided the voice of Crow T. Robot in addition to writing the show. He also guest starred in the show's 11th season.
