= A Year at the Movies: One Man's Filmgoing Odyssey =

- Author: Kevin Murphy
- Subject: Motion pictures
- Publisher: HarperEntertainment
- Publication date: 2002
- Pages: 362
- ISBN: 978-0-06-093786-7
- OCLC: 49531629
- Dewey Decimal: 791.43 21
- LC Class: PN1994 .M83 2002

A Year at the Movies: One Man's Filmgoing Odyssey is a book written by Mystery Science Theater 3000 performer Kevin Murphy about his experiences of seeing a movie each day, for the entire year of 2001. Much of the content derives not only from Murphy's "filmgoing odyssey" but also from his thoughts and observations on the changing nature of the filmgoing experience itself. Murphy comments extensively on the overwhelming prevalence of multiplex movie theaters which generally screen Hollywood blockbuster films at the expense of a wider range of classic, independent and foreign language films. While many of the daily film viewings chronicled in the book fall into the Hollywood kitsch category, quite a few sections deal with films that Murphy actually enjoyed watching, whether because of the film itself or because of the quality of the theater in which it was viewed.

Some notable experiences:

- Dressing as a nun during a showing of The Sound of Music in London.
- His extreme dissatisfaction with the movie Town and Country.
- Bringing an entire Thanksgiving dinner into a movie.
- Enduring the Chris Kattan film Corky Romano with fellow MST3K alum Michael J. Nelson.
- His thoughts during the September 11th terrorist attacks.
- Seeing a movie in a theater made of ice and snow.
