= The Film Crew =

Comedic team

Box art for Hollywood After Dark

The Film Crew was a comedy team that launched in 2004, composed of former Mystery Science Theater 3000 cast members Michael J. Nelson, Bill Corbett, and Kevin Murphy. The team produced segments for television, radio, and home video. They hosted the Legend Films DVD release of four colorized Three Stooges shorts that have fallen into the public domain: Disorder in the Court (1936), Malice in the Palace (1949), Sing a Song of Six Pants, and Brideless Groom (both 1947).

The Film Crew also maintained a website with humor columns and other content geared toward its fans, and contributed comedy segments to NPR.

== Premise ==
The Film Crew, stuck in the confines of their work basement, lay down commentary tracks to whatever obscure movie dished to them by their boss, Bob Honcho. As part of their job, each of the three wears a matching "working-class" uniform and an unwieldy headset while riffing. Each release contained a short "Lunch Break" sketch, in which they would act out a humorous sketch.

== On television ==
The Film Crew occasionally hosted segments between movies on American Movie Classics, Sundance Channel, and the Starz/Encore cable channels in the United States.

In August 2005, during Encore's "Midnight Movies" schedule, The Film Crew provided introductions for the documentary on the subject Midnight Movies: From the Margin to the Mainstream and for the cult classics The Rocky Horror Picture Show, Reefer Madness, Night of the Living Dead, The Harder They Come, and Pink Flamingos.

== On radio ==
The Film Crew created a pilot for a comedic radio program called 3 Men & The Movies for NPR which was well-received but ultimately not picked up. Despite this, the troupe went on to contribute a few comedic, movie-related segments for NPR's All Things Considered program in the fall of 2004, including a review of Sky Captain and the World of Tomorrow as well as an examination of film score cliches.

== On the web ==
The Film Crew hosted a now defunct website that featured original content including comedic essays. The tone and format was somewhat evocative of Timmy Big Hands, a short-lived "webzine" involving several of the same entertainers.

== DVD riffs ==
On October 19, 2006, it was announced that The Film Crew would be providing commentary tracks for a series of B-movies on DVD. To promote their announcement, the Crew offered a poll on their website asking viewers to sample clips of each contender and choose which they would prefer to see released first out of the four announced.

The four titles, in order of votes received (and, as a result, their release order), are:

- Hollywood After Dark, starring Rue McClanahan
- Killers from Space, starring Peter Graves
- The Wild Women of Wongo
- The Giant of Marathon, starring Steve Reeves

The episodes were produced in association with Rhino Entertainment, who had been the intended film distributor. However, they parted ways before the episodes were released. It was not until 2007 that arrangements were made with Shout! Factory to release the material. The change required some "looping" of lines from the original scripts—specifically, "Bob Honcho" was originally named "Bob Rhino" and this had to be changed as Rhino was no longer the distributor.

The DVD releases were in NTSC format but have no region encoding. Each released episode contains at least one extra feature ("Ode to Lunch" in Hollywood After Dark and "Did You Know..." in Killers from Space).

== Fate ==
During the delay when there was no DVD distributor, the sets were destroyed and the cast moved on to the similar project RiffTrax, complicating any possible future Film Crew episodes. Murphy indicated that "We haven’t gotten any new orders from Shout Factory—the new home of MST by the way—and since RiffTrax is becoming so much fun, I think you may have seen the last of The Film Crew."

As of July 2008, The Film Crew's former website, filmcrewonline.com, is defunct. Shortly thereafter, Shout Factory put three Film Crew movies on Hulu. On April 5, 2009, all four riffs became available on YouTube. In February 2016, RiffTrax began selling the Film Crew episodes, either via download or streaming, starting with Killers from Space.
