= Patrick Brantseg =

American puppeteer

Patrick Brantseg is the former Art Director and performer for "Gypsy" on Mystery Science Theater 3000, taking over the character from Jim Mallon, the show's producer, mid-way through the show's eighth season, starting with Agent for H.A.R.M. He began his career at Best Brains, Inc. as an intern in 1992. In that same year he was hired to work in the art department under the direction of Jef Maynard. In 1993, after Michael J. Nelson took over as host, Brantseg was given the title "utility infielder," which meant that he took care of many smaller duties around the BBI offices.

Brantseg hails from Sisseton, South Dakota. He studied art at the University of Minnesota and was doing well until they asked him to leave after two years. In an interview, he stated he was "not ready to learn," "doing very well in art classes and not so well in other things." And in retrospect, "I think there was an attitude problem -- the teachers', not mine." With nowhere else to go, he toured the mid-West as the drummer with the punk band, "Black Spot." After recording a CD and touring, he left the band and returned to school to study television production.

He cites Laurel and Hardy, David Bowie, Buck Owens, Vincent van Gogh and his mother and father as his heroes.
