= Five Minutes to Love =

1963 film by John Hayes

- Directed by: John Hayes
- Written by: William W. Norton (written by); Paul Leder (uncredited)
- Produced by: Ethlyn De Carlo (associate producer); Paul Leder (producer); Max Winter (associate producer)
- Starring: Rue McClanahan
- Cinematography: Paul Hipp
- Music by: Jaime Mendoza-Nava
- Release date: 1963
- Running time: 85 minutes
- Country: United States
- Language: English

Five Minutes to Love (originally known as The Rotten Apple, Junk Yard Love and It Only Takes Five Minutes) is a 1963 American drama film directed by John Hayes and starring Rue McClanahan as Poochie, a woman who lives in a junkyard. The film was critically lambasted, and later picked up by exploitation filmmaker Kroger Babb.

== Plot ==
Young couple Ben and Edna, along with their baby, are on their way to California when their car breaks down. Ben walks to a local junkyard looking for a part to fix his car.

At the junkyard, the seedy owner Harry is being accused of selling stolen auto parts. Ben appears in perfect time to be a scapegoat and Harry tells the police he's the one who's been supplying stolen cars.

When Ben fails to return in the time she expected, Edna goes in search of him and is chased around the junkyard by Harry's strange friend "Blowhard".

== Cast ==
- Rue McClanahan as Sally "Poochie"
- King Moody as Blowhard
- Will Gregory as Ben
- Gaye Gordon as Edna
- Norman Hartweg
- Michael De Carlo
- William Guhl
- Paul Leder as Harry
- Ethlyn De Carlo
- Geraldine Leder as Ben and Edna's Daughter

== Home media ==
The film was released in 2006 by Something Weird Video as a double feature with Walk the Angry Beach under its exploitation title Hollywood After Dark, focusing on McClanahan's roles, as she later gained fame for her work on The Golden Girls.
