= John Hayes (director) =

American actor and film director (1930–2000)

- Born: March 1, 1930; New York City, New York, U.S.
- Died: August 21, 2000 (aged 70); Burbank, California, U.S.
- Occupations: Filmmaker; actor

John Patrick Hayes (March 1, 1930 – August 21, 2000) was an American film director, producer, screenwriter, and actor. He began his career as a screenwriter, writing 1959's The Kiss, which earned an Academy Award nomination for Best Short Film. Hayes is best known for directing low-budget B-movie features and later, exploitation films.

== Biography ==
Hayes was born March 1, 1930, in New York City to first-generation Irish American parents. His parents divorced when he was four years old, after which he was raised by his grandmother and uncle. He had a sister, Dolores, who was raised separately from him in a Catholic convent, and subsequently developed schizophrenia as an adult. After spending two years in the United States Navy, Hayes returned to New York City and began studying acting with Erwin Piscator.

=== Career ===
Hayes began his career in the 1950s producing and directing short films. In 1959, he was nominated for an Academy Award for the short film The Kiss.

In 1961, he directed his first full-length film The Grass Eater. In addition to directing, Hayes also served as producer and writer on many of his films. Occasionally, Hayes appeared in bit parts in television and films, mainly his own features.

Hayes died of cancer in 2000.

== Filmography ==
=== Actor ===
- Treasure of Matecumbe (1976)
- The Shaggy D.A. (1976)
- Crash! (1977)
- End of the World (1977)
- She Came to the Valley (1977)
- Up Yours – A Rockin' Comedy (1977)
- Little House: A New Beginning (1 episode, 1979)

=== Producer ===
- The Kiss (1959)
- Walk the Angry Beach (1968)
- The Cut-Throats (1969)
- Dream No Evil (1970)
- All the Lovin' Kinfolk (1970)
- The Hang Ups (1970)
- The Photographer (1974)

=== Writer ===
- A Cold Wind in August (1961)
- Sweet Trash (1970)
- Dream No Evil (1970)
- All the Lovin' Kinfolk (1970)
- The Hang Ups (1970)
- Grave of the Vampire (1972)
- Heterosexualis (1973)
- Jailbait Babysitter (1978)

=== Director ===
- The Grass Eater (1961)
- Walk the Angry Beach (1961) (aka Hollywood After Dark)
- Just Between Us (1962)
- Five Minutes to Love (1963)
- Shell Shock (1964)
- The Farmer's Other Daughter (1965)
- Fandango (1969)
- The Cut-Throats (1969)
- The Hang Up (1969)
- Sweet Trash (1970)
- Dream No Evil (1970)
- Convicts' Women (1970)
- All the Lovin' Kinfolk (1970)
- Heterosexualis (1973)
- Grave of the Vampire (1972)
- Garden of the Dead (1972)
- Mama's Dirty Girls (1974)
- End of the World (1977)
- Jailbait Babysitter (1978)
- Up Yours (1979)
- Tales from the Darkside (unknown episodes)
