= Bill Corbett =

American actor (born 1960)

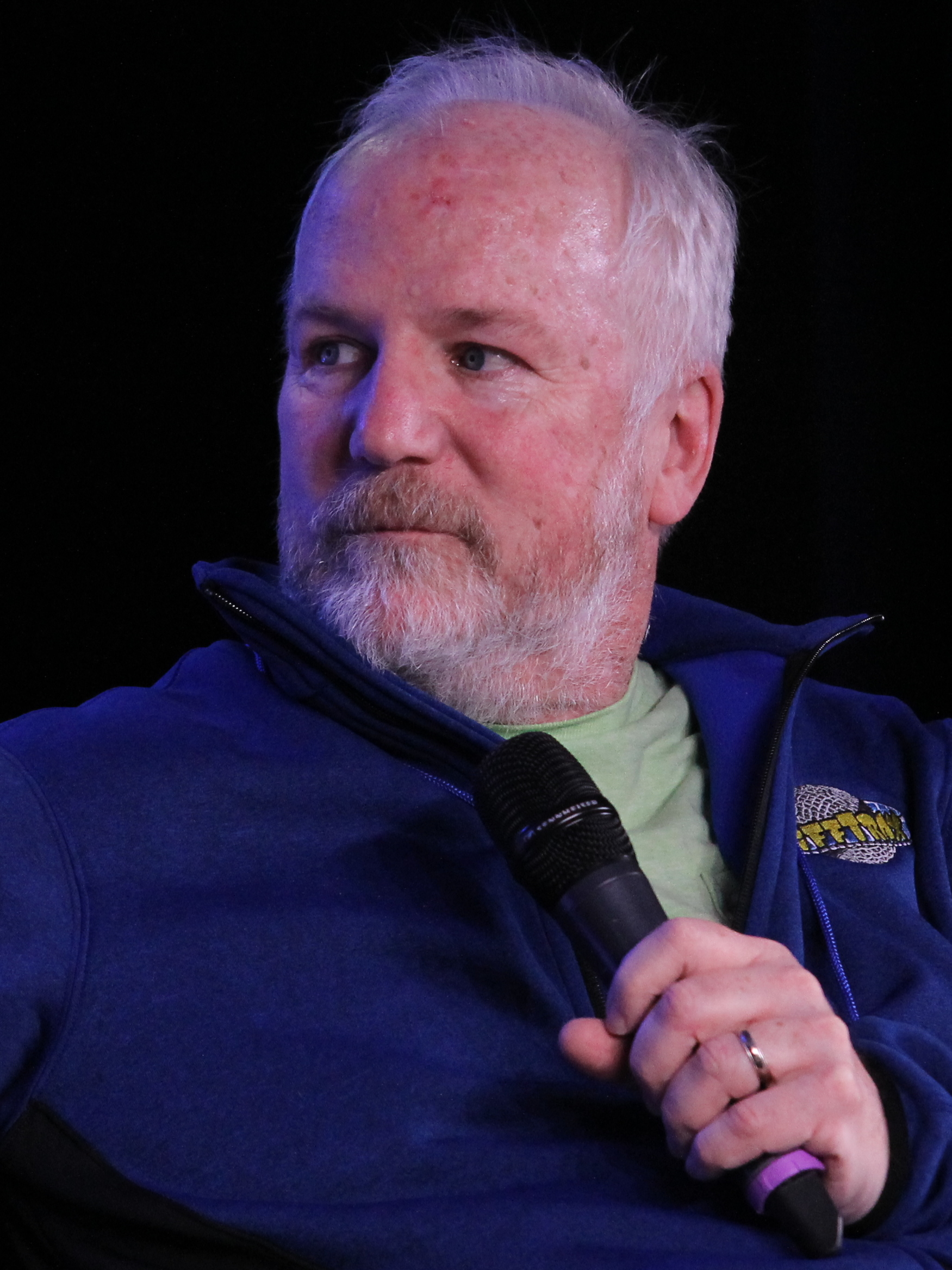
- Corbett in 2018
- Born: March 30, 1960 (age 66); New York City, New York, U.S.
- Education: Yale University (BA, MFA)
- Occupations: Actor, puppeteer, writer
- Spouse: Virginia Corbett
- Children: 2

William Daniel Corbett (born March 30, 1960) is an American writer and performer for television, film and theatre. He was a writer and performer on the cult television show Mystery Science Theater 3000 (MST3K), for which he voiced Crow T. Robot during the show's later seasons on the Sci Fi Channel. During that time, he also played the character Observer, along with other minor roles.

== Career ==
In addition to his work on Mystery Science Theater 3000, in 1991 he starred in the computer game Sherlock Holmes: Consulting Detective, and in 2001 Corbett co-wrote the Sci Fi Channel miniseries The Adventures of Edward the Less, with several other former MST3K writers. Corbett also co-wrote the 2008 film Meet Dave starring Eddie Murphy.

From 2002 to 2006, Corbett was a member of The Film Crew, a movie-riffing comedic team comprising former MST3K costars Michael J. Nelson and Kevin Murphy. Since 2006, Corbett has also recorded audio commentary tracks with Nelson and Murphy for Nelson's RiffTrax service and contributes regular humor posts to the RiffTrax blog. In 2014, Corbett and RiffTrax colleague Len Peralta created the comic book Super Powered Revenge Christmas.

Corbett hosted the podcast Bill Corbett's Funhouse from October 2018 until its ending in January 2020.

Corbett appeared on the September 29, 2020 episode of The George Lucas Talk Show with fellow guest Dana Schwartz.

== Personal life ==
Corbett attended Xaverian High School, going on to earn a Bachelor of Arts from Yale College and a Master of Fine Arts from the Yale School of Drama.

Corbett lives in Minneapolis with his wife Virginia and their two children.

He is also a member of the Democratic Socialists of America and helped canvass for Eunisses Hernandez and Hugo Soto-Martinez during the 2022 Los Angeles elections.

== See also ==
- Timmy Big Hands
