= Dream No Evil =

1970 American horror film by John Hayes

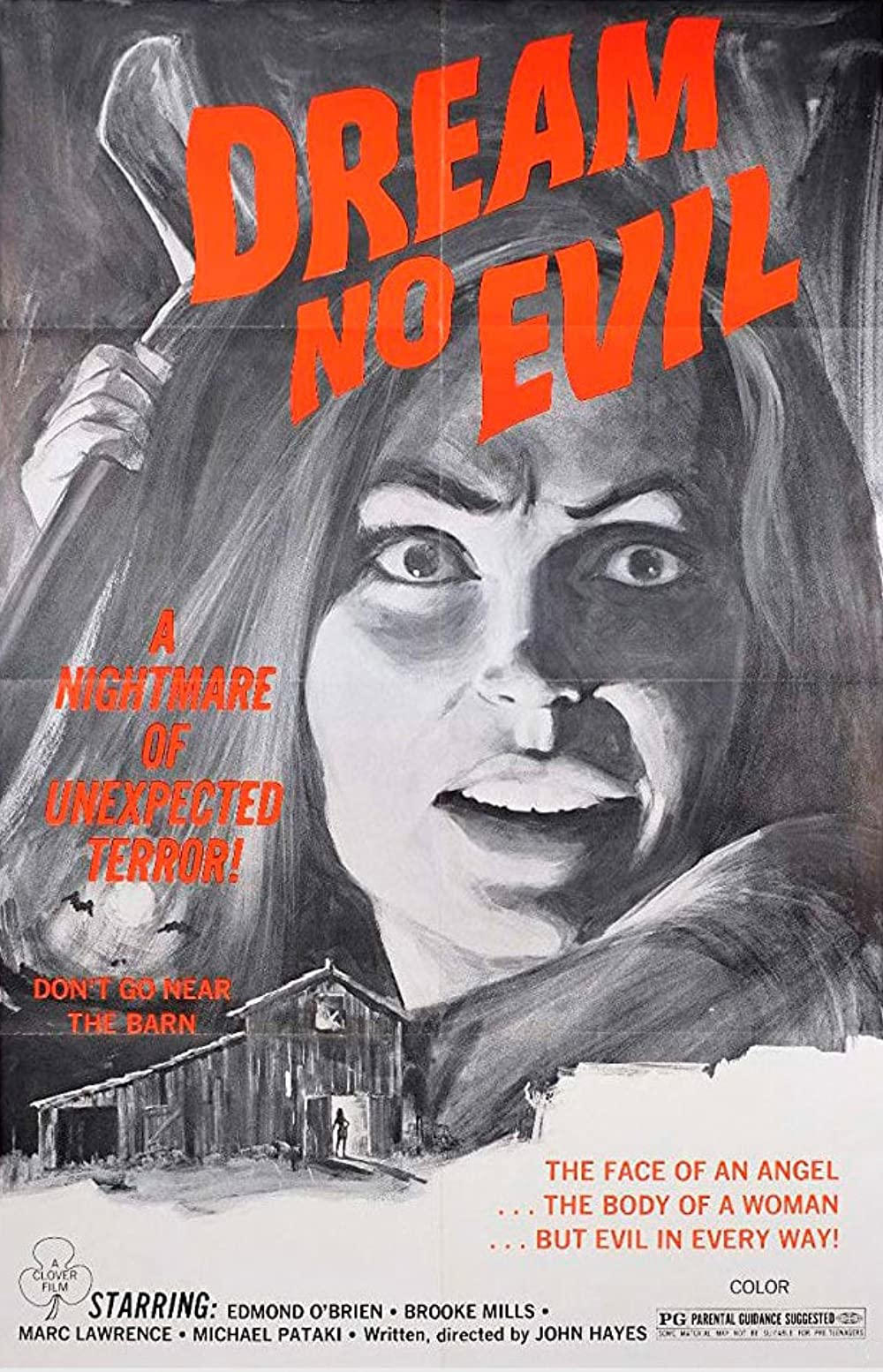
- Theatrical release poster
- Directed by: John Hayes
- Written by: John Hayes
- Produced by: John Hayes; Daniel Cady
- Starring: Edmond O'Brien; Brooke Mills; Marc Lawrence; Michael Pataki
- Cinematography: Paul Hipp
- Edited by: Luke Porano
- Music by: Jaime Mendoza-Nava
- Distributed by: Clover Films
- Release date: 1970
- Running time: 84 minutes
- Country: United States
- Language: English

Dream No Evil is a 1970 American horror film written and directed by John Hayes, and starring Edmond O'Brien, Brooke Mills, and Marc Lawrence. Its plot follows a young woman who, adopted and raised by a traveling evangelist group, develops a deadly obsession with locating her birth father. It was also released under the alternate titles The Faith Healer and Now I Lay Me Down to Die.

== Plot ==
Grace MacDonald is orphaned by her parents and adopted as a child by a traveling Evangelist church in California who performs entertainment acts as part of their proselytizing. As an adult, Grace famously performs a high dive in the church's Hell-themed performances, led by Reverend Paul Jessie Bundy. The Reverend's brother, Patrick Bundy, a Los Angeles medical student engaged to Grace, lives his life separate from the church, though he remains committed to her.

Patrick drives into the desert to visit Grace at one of the church's events in the Antelope Valley. Grace, a virgin, refuses Patrick's sexual advances, though she quietly struggles with her own sexual desires. In her spare time, Grace attempts to locate her biological father, Timothy, with whom she is obsessed. She eventually locates him after he dies and is received by the local morgue as a John Doe. While Grace views his body, Timothy miraculously returns to life, murdering the undertaker in the morgue.

Grace brings her father back with her to a dilapidated farm where she and the Reverend are staying. Timothy is abrasive toward the Reverend, though Grace insists her father stay. Meanwhile, the Reverend professes his love for Grace, and the two begin to kiss in the barn. Timothy witnesses the scene, and murders the Reverend with a cleaving axe. Later, Grace awakens in an abandoned farmhouse on the compound. Believing the Reverend's murder may have been only a dream, she returns to the barn, but her fears are confirmed when she finds his bloodied corpse buried under straw. She disposes of his body in a garbage dump near the property. Grace begins to question her sanity, believing that her father could be merely a figment of her imagination.

Meanwhile, back in Los Angeles, Patrick attempts to care for one of his medical student peers, Shirley, a woman with severe depression. The two, who live in the same apartment building, end up having sex. The following day, Grace travels to the city to visit Patrick at the hospital where he is completing his residency, but he is unable to talk with her. The Reverend's body is subsequently discovered by authorities, and Patrick directs the sheriff, Mike Pender, to the farm where Grace told him she is staying. While inspecting the property, the sheriff is murdered by an assailant with a scythe.

Later, Grace confides to her father that she fears Patrick is cheating on her with Shirley. Timothy declares that he will exact revenge. Moments later, Patrick and Shirley arrive to check on Grace. Grace lures Patrick to the barn as Shirley watches curiously from the car. Patrick sees the sheriff's corpse stuffed in his police car, after which Grace appears brandishing an axe. Patrick and Shirley attempt to flee in the car, but Grace begins hysterically smashing the windows with the axe. Patrick manages to subdue Grace by holding her down and injecting her with thiopental from his medical kit.

Authorities eventually arrive, and a detective explains Grace's dissociative psychosis to Patrick and Shirley: Her father was in fact a figment of her imagination, and she herself committed all of the murders. Before she is taken away by police, Grace apologizes to Patrick on behalf of her father, who she says will "have to pay for all the things he has done."

== Cast ==
- Edmond O'Brien as Timothy MacDonald
- Brooke Mills as Grace MacDonald
  - Vickie Schreck as young Grace
- Marc Lawrence as Undertaker
- Michael Pataki as Reverend Paul Jessie Bundy
- Paul Prokop as Patrick Bundy
- Arthur Franz as John, County Psychiatrist
- Donna Anders as Shirley
- William Guhl as Sheriff Mike Pender

== Production ==
The film was produced by Clover Films, a joint venture between writer-director John Hayes and producer Daniel Cady. The screenplay was partly inspired by Hayes's own sister, who was raised in a convent and later developed schizophrenia as an adult.

== Release ==
Arrow Films released Dream No Evil on Blu-ray as part of their American Horror Project: Volume 2 film set on July 25, 2019.
