= Jim Mallon =

American film and television producer

James Joseph Mallon
- Born: March 19, 1956 (age 70); Rochester, Minnesota, U.S.
- Education: University of Wisconsin–Madison
- Occupations: Actor; puppeteer; director; mental health counselor
- Years active: 1987–present
- Children: 2

James Joseph Mallon (born March 19, 1956) is an American television and film producer and writer, most notable for being executive producer of the Peabody Award-winning series Mystery Science Theater 3000 (MST3K). He is also president of the series' original production company, Best Brains, Inc., directed more than 75 episodes of MST3K, and played the role of Gypsy from the first season until Jack Frost in the middle of the eighth season. From 2012 to 2025 Mallon worked as a mental health counselor.

== Early career and education ==
A native of Rochester, Minnesota, Mallon began producing television and comedy movies while still in high school, and continued while attending the University of Wisconsin–Madison.

Mallon also produced and directed programs for CBS and PBS affiliates WISC-TV and WHA-TV in Madison and made his feature film debut in 1987 with Blood Hook, distributed worldwide by Troma, Inc.

== Mystery Science Theater 3000 ==
In 1986, Mallon became the production manager of a new independent UHF television station, KTMA, in Minneapolis. There Mallon hired future MST3K cohort, Kevin Murphy. In 1988, Mallon met series creator Joel Hodgson and Mystery Science Theater 3000 was born.

As MST3K began to gain national attention, Mallon and Hodgson began to disagree on the future of the series. Hodgson said in a 1999 interview with The A.V. Club that the reason he left the series was due to creative infighting between him and Mallon, presumably over the possibility of a movie based on the series. As a result, Mallon ended up with majority ownership of the program. Mallon later directed Mystery Science Theater 3000: The Movie, released by Gramercy Pictures on April 19, 1996. Due in part to poor marketing, the film was a box office failure.

Hodgson regained control of the MST3K property before a 2017 relaunch on Netflix. Mallon is credited as an original producer in the revival's end credits through both seasons.

== Personal life ==
In 1978, at the University of Wisconsin–Madison, Jim and Leon Varjian won a campus election by promising to give issues "the seriousness they deserve." In 1979 and 1980 they created a version of the Planet of the Apes scene by erecting replicas of the torch and the top of the head of the Statue of Liberty on the frozen surface of Lake Mendota, creating a suggestion that the entire statue was standing on the bottom of the lake. During MST3K's third season, Mallon's son, Eli Mallon, appeared as the Miracle Growth Baby in the episode "Time of the Apes". Jim's daughter died at a young age, which led Mallon to his second career. In 2012, he graduated with a master's degree in counseling from the University of St. Thomas and joined the staff of Birch Counseling.

In 2017, Mallon was diagnosed with Parkinson's disease. He worked as a mental health counselor in 2012 until his retirement in 2025.
