= Gramercy Pictures =

Former American film production label

- Relaunch logo, used from 2015 to 2016
- Type: Subsidiary (original); Label (relaunch)
- Industry: Film
- Founded: May 20, 1992; 34 years ago (original); May 12, 2015; 11 years ago (relaunch)
- Defunct: April 7, 1999; 27 years ago (original); April 29, 2016; 10 years ago (relaunch)
- Fate: Sold to USA Networks and merged with Interscope Communications and October Films to form USA Films (original); Closed (relaunch)
- Successor: USA Films (original); Focus Features
- Headquarters: Universal City, California, United States
- Products: Motion pictures
- Parent: PolyGram Filmed Entertainment (1992–1998); Universal Studios (1992–1996, 1998–1999); USA Networks (1999); Focus Features (2015–2016)

Gramercy Pictures was an American film production and distribution label of Focus Features. It was founded on May 20, 1992 as a joint venture between PolyGram Filmed Entertainment and Universal Pictures. Gramercy was the distributor of PolyGram films in the United States and Canada and also served as Universal's art-house division. After Seagram's buyout of PolyGram, Barry Diller acquired Gramercy, Interscope Communications, and October Films, merging the three companies to form USA Films in 1999. On May 12, 2015, Focus Features (the current art-house division for Universal) revived the name as a label for action, horror and sci-fi genre films; the label was phased out again after the release of the film adaptation of the video game series Ratchet & Clank on April 29, 2016, and a shift from genre films by Focus Features.

== History ==
=== Origins ===
Gramercy Pictures was formed on May 20, 1992 as a joint venture between PolyGram Filmed Entertainment and Universal Pictures, the latter was Universal's arthouse wing, and the former was PolyGram's US distributor. Before this, Universal had distributed similar films under smaller operations Universal Classics from 1982 to 1984 and the U.S. distribution branch of the Canadian distributor Cineplex Odeon Films (MCA had a 49% in Cineplex Odeon) from 1986 to 1989. Cineplex Odeon would also distribute Gramercy's releases theatrically in Canada, including the PolyGram titles until 1997, when PolyGram would assume Canadian distribution of their titles. Gramercy Pictures released its first film, the Mario Van Peebles western Posse, on May 14, 1993.

On January 11, 1996, PolyGram bought the 50% stake owned by Universal thus assuming full control of Gramercy. The distributor also had box office hits in 1994's Four Weddings and a Funeral, 1996's Fargo and 1997's Bean. Several Gramercy releases of the 1990s have grown in stature to become cult classics in the present day: The Big Lebowski, Dazed and Confused, Clay Pigeons and Mallrats. In addition, 1995's The Usual Suspects won two Oscars, for Best Original Screenplay (Christopher McQuarrie) and Best Supporting Actor (Kevin Spacey). Universal would later acquire rival October Films in 1997.

In 1997, the company was reorganized. The main US distribution space was taken by PolyGram Films, with Gramercy demoted to arthouse status.

When Seagram acquired PolyGram on May 22, 1998, PolyGram was merged and folded into Universal; as a result, it reacquired Gramercy as it controlled Universal. In turn, Seagram sold the bulk of the PolyGram film library titles released up until March 31, 1996 to Metro-Goldwyn-Mayer (MGM) in 1999, and later on, it sold Gramercy and two other specialty divisions, Interscope Communications and October Films, to Barry Diller's USA Networks, which merged all three companies into USA Films. USA Films was then merged with Universal's own art-house division, Universal Focus, and transformed into Focus Features in 2002. USA Network was formerly owned by Vivendi Universal from 2002 to 2004 and NBCUniversal from 2004 to 2026. PolyGram Entertainment was founded by Universal Music Group on February 11, 2017 as the successor to both PolyGram and PolyGram Filmed Entertainment and a revival of the "PolyGram" brand.

=== Relaunch and second closure ===
On May 12, 2015, Focus Features announced that the Gramercy label has been revived to release action, horror and sci-fi genre films. Its first release was Insidious: Chapter 3 on June 5, 2015 and later films like Sinister 2 and London Has Fallen. The revived label was later phased out again following the box-office failure of the film adaptation of Ratchet & Clank (2016) and a shift from genre films by Focus Features.

== Filmography ==
Focus Features and Universal Pictures own the distribution rights to the original and relaunch of Gramercy's films unless otherwise mentioned.

=== 1990s ===
Release date	Title	Notes	Budget	Gross
May 14, 1993	Posse (Note: Owned by MGM)	North American theatrical distribution only; produced by PolyGram Filmed Entertainment and Working Title Films	$10 million	$18,289,763
August 20, 1993	King of the Hill	distribution only; produced by Wildwood Enterprises and Bona Fide Productions	$8 million	$1,214,231
September 3, 1993	Kalifornia	North American theatrical distribution only; produced by PolyGram Filmed Entertainment, Viacom Pictures and Propaganda Films	$8.5 million	$2,395,231
September 24, 1993	Dazed and Confused	distribution only; produced by Alphaville and Detour Filmproduction	$6.9 million	$7,993,039
November 5, 1993	A Home of Our Own	North American theatrical distribution only; produced by PolyGram Filmed Entertainment	$12 million	$1,677,807
December 3, 1993	A Dangerous Woman	North American distribution only; produced by Amblin Entertainment, Island World and Rollercoaster Productions		$1,497,222
February 4, 1994	Romeo Is Bleeding	North American theatrical distribution only; produced by PolyGram Filmed Entertainment and Working Title Films	$10 million	$3,275,865
February 25, 1994	Savage Nights	U.S. and English-speaking Canadian theatrical co-distribution with PolyGram Filmed Entertainment only		$662,341
March 11, 1994	Four Weddings and a Funeral	North American theatrical distribution only; produced by PolyGram Filmed Entertainment, Channel Four Films and Working Title Films; Nominee of the Academy Award for Best Picture; Nominee of the Golden Globe Award for Best Motion Picture – Musical or Comedy	$4.4 million	$245,700,832
April 15, 1994	Backbeat	North American theatrical distribution only; produced by PolyGram Filmed Entertainment and Scala Productions		$2,392,589
May 6, 1994	Dream Lover	North American theatrical distribution only; produced by PolyGram Filmed Entertainment, Propaganda Films, Nicita/Lloyd Productions and Edward R. Pressman Productions		$256,264
July 29, 1994	Foreign Student	North American, U.K., Irish, Australian and New Zealand distribution only; produced by Silvio Berlusconi Communications and Carthago Films		
August 10, 1994	The Adventures of Priscilla, Queen of the Desert	North American theatrical distribution only; produced by PolyGram Filmed Entertainment, Latent Image and Specific Films; Nominee of the Golden Globe Award for Best Motion Picture – Musical or Comedy	$2 million	$29,679,915
September 9, 1994	A Good Man in Africa (Note: Distribution rights co-owned by Resurgence Media Group)	North American, U.K. and Irish distribution only; produced by Polar Entertainment, Capitol Films and Southern Sun	$20 million	$2,308,390
September 28, 1994	Jason's Lyric	North American theatrical distribution only; produced by PolyGram Filmed Entertainment, Propaganda Films and the Jackson/McHenry Company	$7 million	$20,851,521
October 28, 1994	Drop Squad	distribution only; produced by 40 Acres and a Mule Filmworks		$734,693
November 4, 1994	Double Dragon (Note: Owned by Moonstone Entertainment, with distribution rights licensed to MVD Entertainment Group)	U.S. distribution only; produced by Imperial Entertainment	$7.8 million	$2,341,309
January 20, 1995	S.F.W.	North American theatrical distribution only; produced by PolyGram Filmed Entertainment, A&M Films and Propaganda Films		$63,513
February 10, 1995	Shallow Grave (Note: Owned by Film4 Productions)	North American theatrical distribution only; produced by Channel Four Films and Figment Films	$2.5 million	$19,779,614
February 24, 1995	Before the Rain	North American theatrical distribution only Nominee of the Academy Award for Best Foreign Language Film		$763,847
March 17, 1995	Candyman: Farewell to the Flesh	North American theatrical distribution only; produced by PolyGram Filmed Entertainment and Propaganda Films		$13,940,383
April 19, 1995	New Jersey Drive	distribution only; produced by 40 Acres and a Mule Filmworks	$5 million	$3,565,508
April 28, 1995	The Underneath	distribution only; produced by Populist Pictures	$6.5 million	$536,023
May 3, 1995	Panther	North American theatrical distribution only; produced by PolyGram Filmed Entertainment, Working Title Films, Tribeca Productions and MVP Films		$6,834,525
August 16, 1995	The Usual Suspects	North American theatrical distribution only; produced by PolyGram Filmed Entertainment, Spelling Films International, Blue Parrot Productions and Bad Hat Harry Productions	$6 million	$34,380,094
September 22, 1995	Canadian Bacon	North American theatrical distribution only; produced by PolyGram Filmed Entertainment, Propaganda Films, David Brown Productions and Maverick Picture Company	$11 million	$178,104
September 29, 1995	Moonlight and Valentino	North American theatrical distribution only; produced by PolyGram Filmed Entertainment and Working Title Films		$2,484,226
October 20, 1995	Mallrats	distribution only; produced by Alphaville and View Askew Productions	$6.1 million	$2,122,561
November 10, 1995	Carrington	North American theatrical distribution only; produced by PolyGram Filmed Entertainment		$3,242,342
December 29, 1995	Dead Man Walking	North American theatrical distribution only; produced by PolyGram Filmed Entertainment, Working Title Films and Havoc	$11 million	$83,080,768
February 23, 1996	Hate (La Haine) (Note: Owned by Le Pacte and StudioCanal, with U.S. distribution rights licensed to The Criterion Collection and Janus Films)	North American theatrical co-distribution with PolyGram Filmed Entertainment and Egg Pictures only	€2,590,000	$309,811
March 8, 1996	Fargo	North American theatrical distribution only; produced by PolyGram Filmed Entertainment and Working Title Films; Nominee of the Academy Award for Best Picture; Nominee of the Golden Globe Award for Best Motion Picture – Musical or Comedy; Inducted into the National Film Registry in 2006	$7 million	$60,611,975
March 22, 1996	Jack and Sarah	North American theatrical distribution only; produced by PolyGram Filmed Entertainment		$218,626 (USA) $2,492,000 (UK)
March 22, 1996	Land and Freedom	North American theatrical co-distribution with PolyGram Filmed Entertainment only		$228,800
April 19, 1996	Mystery Science Theater 3000: The Movie	distribution only; produced by Best Brains		$1,007,306
May 3, 1996	Barb Wire	North American theatrical distribution only; produced by PolyGram Filmed Entertainment, Propaganda Films and Dark Horse Entertainment	$9 million	$3,793,614
May 10, 1996	Cold Comfort Farm	North American distribution only; produced by BBC Films and Thames International		$5,682,429
August 30, 1996	The Trigger Effect	distribution only; produced by Amblin Entertainment	$8 million	$3,622,979
September 13, 1996	Grace of My Heart	North American distribution only; distributed internationally by Universal Pictures	$5 million	$660,313
October 4, 1996	Bound (Note: Owned by Paramount Pictures (via Melange Pictures LLC))	North American theatrical co-distribution with Spelling Films only; produced by Dino De Laurentiis Company	$6 million	$3,802,260
October 18, 1996	Jude	North American theatrical distribution only; produced by PolyGram Filmed Entertainment, BBC Films and Revolution Films	$7 million	$409,144
October 25, 1996	When We Were Kings (Note: Owned by Das Films, with U.S. distribution rights licensed to Shout! Studios (via Westchester Films), which has sub-licensed it to Janus Films and the Criterion Collection)	North American theatrical distribution only; produced by Das Films; Winner of the Academy Award for Best Documentary Feature		$2,789,985
December 24, 1996	The Portrait of a Lady	North American theatrical distribution only; produced by PolyGram Filmed Entertainment and Propaganda Films		$3,692,836
December 24, 1996	I'm Not Rappaport	distribution only; produced by GreeneStreet Films		$26,011
January 29, 1997	Gridlock'd	North American theatrical distribution only; produced by PolyGram Filmed Entertainment, Interscope Communications, Def Pictures, Webster and Dragon Pictures	$5 million	$5,571,205
March 7, 1997	The Eighth Day	U.S. theatrical distribution only		$416,401
April 11, 1997	Keys to Tulsa (Note: Owned by ITV Studios)	U.S. theatrical distribution only; produced by ITC Entertainment		$57,252
May 2, 1997	Commandments	distribution only; produced by Northern Lights Entertainment	$5 million	$548,562
May 9, 1997	Twin Town	North American theatrical distribution only; produced by PolyGram Filmed Entertainment and Figment Films	$3.3 million	$127,923
August 6, 1997	Def Jam's How to Be a Player	U.S. theatrical distribution only; produced by PolyGram Filmed Entertainment, Island Pictures and Outlaw Productions	$12 million	$14,009,368
September 19, 1997	Going All the Way (Note: Owned by Shamrock Holdings, with distribution rights licensed to Ultimate Media Group, which has sub-licensed U.S. rights to Shout! Studios)	U.S. theatrical distribution only; produced by Lakeshore Entertainment		$113,069
October 3, 1997	The Matchmaker	U.S. theatrical distribution only; produced by PolyGram Filmed Entertainment and Working Title Films		$3,392,080
November 7, 1997	Bean	U.S. theatrical distribution only; produced by PolyGram Filmed Entertainment, Working Title Films and Tiger Aspect Films	$18 million	$251,212,670
March 6, 1998	The Big Lebowski	U.S. theatrical distribution only; produced by PolyGram Filmed Entertainment and Working Title Films; Inducted into the National Film Registry in 2014	$15 million	$46,129,927
March 27, 1998	No Looking Back	U.S. theatrical distribution only; produced by Marlboro Road Gang, Good Machine and South Fork Pictures	$5 million	$222,099
May 1, 1998	Go Now	U.S. theatrical distribution only; produced by Revolution Films and BBC Films		$25,695
May 29, 1998	The Last Days of Disco	U.S. theatrical distribution only; produced by Castle Rock Entertainment	$8 million	$3,020,601
June 12, 1998	The Land Girls	U.S. theatrical distribution only; produced by Intermedia Films, Channel Four Films, Greenpoint Films and West Eleven Films		$238,497
August 19, 1998	Your Friends & Neighbors	U.S. theatrical distribution only; produced by PolyGram Filmed Entertainment and Propaganda Films	$5 million	$4,714,658
September 25, 1998	Clay Pigeons	U.S. theatrical distribution only; produced by Intermedia Films and Scott Free Productions	$8 million	$2,253,139
October 16, 1998	Reach the Rock	distributed by Universal Pictures		$4,960
November 6, 1998	Elizabeth	U.S. theatrical distribution only; produced by PolyGram Filmed Entertainment, Channel Four Films and Working Title Films; Nominee of the Academy Award for Best Picture; Nominee of the Golden Globe Award for Best Motion Picture – Drama	$30 million	$82,150,642
December 30, 1998	The Hi-Lo Country	U.S. theatrical distribution only; produced by PolyGram Filmed Entertainment, Working Title Films and Cappa/De Fina		$166,082
March 5, 1999	Lock, Stock and Two Smoking Barrels	U.S. theatrical distribution only; produced by the Steve Tisch Company and SKA Productions	$1.4 million	$28,172,686
October 1, 1999	Plunkett & Macleane	presenter credit only; produced by Working Title Films; distributed in the U.S. by USA Films		
October 29, 1999	Being John Malkovich	presenter credit only; produced by Propaganda Films and Single Cell Pictures; distributed in the U.S. by USA Films; Nominee of the Golden Globe Award for Best Motion Picture – Musical or Comedy	$13 million	$32,382,381

=== 2000s ===
Release date	Title	Notes	Budget	Gross
February 18, 2000	Pitch Black	presenter credit only; produced by Interscope Communications; distributed in the U.S. by USA Films	$23 million	$53,187,659
March 24, 2000	Waking the Dead	presenter credit only; produced by Egg Pictures; distributed in the U.S. by USA Films	$8.5 million	$327,418
April 14, 2000	Where the Money Is	presenter credit only; produced by Intermedia Films, Pacifica Film Distribution and Scott Free Productions; distributed in the U.S. by USA Films	$28 million	$7,243,669
August 4, 2000	Mad About Mambo	presenter credit only; produced by Phoenix Pictures, First City Features and Plurabelle Films; distributed in the U.S. by USA Films		$65,283
September 8, 2000	Nurse Betty	presenter credit only; produced by Pacifica Film Distribution, Propaganda Films and Ab'Strakt Pictures; distributed in the U.S. by USA Films	$25 million	$29,360,400

=== 2010s ===
Release date	Title	Notes	Budget	Gross
June 5, 2015	Insidious: Chapter 3	U.S. theatrical distribution only; produced by Stage 6 Films, Entertainment One and Blumhouse Productions	$10 million	$112,983,889
July 10, 2015	Self/less	studio credit only; produced by Endgame Entertainment; distributed in the U.S. by Focus Features	$26 million	$30,523,226
August 21, 2015	Sinister 2	U.S. distribution only; produced by Entertainment One, IM Global and Blumhouse Productions	$10 million	$52,882,018
January 8, 2016	The Forest	North American distribution only; produced by AI Film, Lava Bear Films and Phantom Four Films	$10 million	$37,608,299
March 4, 2016	London Has Fallen	U.S. distribution only; produced by Millennium Films and G-BASE	$60 million	$191,094,450
April 29, 2016	Ratchet & Clank	North American distribution only; produced by Rainmaker Entertainment and Blockade Entertainment; final film released before Gramercy's dissolution and only animated film	$20 million	$12,880,804
