= Timmy Big Hands =

- Founder: Michael J. Nelson
- Founded: 2000
- Based in: United States
- Language: English

Timmy Big Hands was a humor webzine created in 2000 by the former cast and crew of Mystery Science Theater 3000, including Michael J. Nelson, Bill Corbett, and Kevin Murphy. The site garnered much critical acclaim and accolades, but was eventually retired the following year. The site featured odd but humorous reviews of everyday items, comics, strange games, and new syrup ads each week.

== Content ==
Games included such oddities as "Kill-a-Guy" where the player is God, and a simple click on a man kills him, as well as an interactive game called "Apologize to Steve", in which the concept was to apologize to Steve.

Comics included "The Cliparts" which were simply crafted from clip art and given dialogue balloons. The stories were usually nonsensical and the art would run the gamut from office workers to suddenly having a tall Indian enter the frame.

In 2001, the site was put up for sale on eBay. The new owners decided not to continue with the project. In an interview in 2003, Nelson stated

Timmy Big Hands, you know, it was great fun, it was successful for what it was. We got unbelievable press and we were really proud of the product. But [it was] a really bad time to start a website and we just couldn't — We all had our separate things going on. We were producing it together, but in the end it ate up too much time and wasn’t making any money, so we just had to fold it. We thought about perhaps turning it into a book or doing this or that, but it was just too complicated by that time. So we just folded it down.

== Contributors ==
- Michael J. Nelson
- Kevin Murphy
- Bill Corbett
- Patrick Brantseg
- Paul Chaplin
