= Mike Nelson's Death Rat! =

2003 novel by Michael J. Nelson

- Author: Michael J. Nelson
- Cover artist: Michael Koelsch
- Language: English
- Genre: Humor, fiction
- Published: 2003
- Publisher: HarperCollins
- Publication place: United States

Mike Nelson's Death Rat! is the first full-length novel by American author Michael J. Nelson. It was first published on April 1, 2003. The cover art was illustrated by pulp artist Michael Koelsch.

== Plot ==
Death Rat! is primarily a satire, with its main subject being the state of Minnesota, where Nelson lives. Nelson's targets include parodies of famous Minnesota residents like Prince and Garrison Keillor, as well as the attitudes and quirks of Minnesotans in general.

The protagonist of Mike Nelson's Death Rat! is Pontius Feeb, usually called Ponty, an author of many historical treatises who has just been fired. While working in a fast food restaurant he gets the idea to write a novel of historical fiction based in the small town of Holey, Minnesota. Feeb's novel revolves around the conflict between two citizens of Holey in the early 1900s, and a giant rodent from which the novel gets its name. However, when he tries to sell the novel to a publisher, he is told that he doesn't look right to be the author of an action novel. Feeb then enlists the help of local actor Jack Ryback to pretend he wrote the book and attempt to sell it. Jack sells the novel easily, but tells the publisher that it is a non-fiction book, instead of a novel. Jack and Pontius then work with the citizens of Holey to attempt to cover up the book's fictional nature. During their many visits to Holey, Ponty becomes friendly with the town's female mayor. As Feeb's Death Rat grows in popularity, the cover-up becomes harder and harder to maintain, as the rock star "King Leo" adopts the book as the scripture of a new religion, and sets up a revival in Holey. Meanwhile, a rival Minnesotan author desperately tries to discredit Jack and "his" book.

In the end the plot is revealed, And after a flurry of lawsuits and media attention Jack and Pontius go back to doing minimum-wage work in St. Paul. In the end, Ponty decides to go live in Holey with the friends that he made there.

== Characters ==
Pontius "Ponty" Feeb - A small bookish history author with a number of failed nonfiction books to his name.

Jack Ryback- A large, rugged failed actor who looks the part of an outdoorsman.

Gus Bromstad - Homespun author of the Dogwood books.

King Leo - A Prince-esque funk superstar.

Sandi Knutson - Mayor of Holey and love interest of Ponty.

Ralph - Barkeep at Holey's local pub, the Taconite.

== See also ==
- Michael J. Nelson
