= K26AC =

First low-power TV station in the United States

Bemidji, Minnesota; United States
- Channels: Analog: 26 (UHF)

Ownership
- Owner: Red River Broadcast Corp.

History
- Founded: April 21, 1981
- First air date: January 12, 1982
- Last air date: June 20, 1999; (17 years, 159 days)
- Former affiliations: SelecTV (1982–1989); Fox (via KVRR, 1989–1999)

Technical information
- Facility ID: 55366
- ERP: 1 kW
- HAAT: 152 m (499 ft)
- Transmitter coordinates: 47°33′19″N 94°47′59″W

K26AC (channel 26) was a low-power television station in Bemidji, Minnesota, United States. Owned by John Boler, it was the first low-power station to locally originate programs, instead of being a translator of another station, and one of the longest-running subscription television (STV) operations in the country. K26AC later was converted to repeat KVRR of Fargo, North Dakota, and it was forced off the air by the establishment of a full-power station on the channel on June 20, 1999.

== History ==
On May 15, 1981, the Federal Communications Commission (FCC) made television history when it issued to John Boler the first-ever construction permit for a low-power television station that could originate its own programming. Boler had previously built and operated television stations in North and South Dakota, selling the last of his holdings in 1978, but the creation of the low-power television service lured him out of retirement. Channel 26 had been allocated as a full-power assignment to Bemidji in 1966 but was never built out.

K26AC began broadcasting on January 12, 1982. Until its sign-on, Bemidji's only broadcast television service was a translator of KBJR-TV from Duluth. During the day, the station aired two live daily newscasts, Bemidji State Beavers athletic events, CNN Headline News simulcasts, and some off-network reruns and syndicated fare. The station used telephone and door-to-door surveys to solicit input for its programming. At night, for $16 a month, it offered subscription television programming, including an optional adults only package.

Channel 26 telecast from a 460-foot (140 m) tower atop the Continental Divide. The facility, which included studios and a mobile unit, cost Boler $650,000. The station had 18 full-time and 7 part-time staff. Channel 26's reach was expanded in November 1982 when K18AI channel 18 at Grand Rapids began broadcasting, with plans to have news staff in the town to contribute to the newscasts from Bemidji.

Despite the ambitious local programming and support from local advertisers, the station's money came primarily from its subscription television programming, which was sourced from SelecTV and had 1,000 subscribers by early 1983. In November 1982, Boler told Broadcasting magazine, "We could go into the black next month if we switched completely to STV." On April 1, 1983, the station went into 24-hour STV operation, saying that it was easier to sell subscriptions than advertising. Subscription television was reported to have lasted longer in Bemidji and Grand Rapids than almost anywhere else in the United States. In February 1986, Broadcasting noted that K26AC-K18AI and WNUV in Baltimore were the very last subscription outlets operating. The stations continued as subscription operations using SelecTV and its successor Starion Premiere Cinema, serving several hundred customers, until Starion folded in early 1989; at that time, K26AC and K18AI became translators for KVRR.

Red River Broadcasting, licensee of KVRR and partly owned by Boler, would obtain a construction permit to build a full-power channel 26 station in Bemidji with the call letters KXBJ in July 1983. However, the station was never built. Instead, Clear Channel Communications, owners of WFTC in Minneapolis, built and signed on channel 26 as satellite station KFTC on June 20, 1999, forcing K26AC off the air. On September 1 of that year, K18AI had switched to rebroadcasting KVRR's new sister station in Duluth, KQDS-TV (channel 21); it is today KQDS-TV translator K29EB-D on RF channel 29.
