= Walk the Angry Beach =

1961 film by John Hayes

- DVD cover
- Directed by: John Hayes
- Written by: John Hayes
- Produced by: John Hayes
- Starring: Anthony Vorno; Rue McClanahan; John Barrick; Paul Bruce; Ernest Macias; Lea Marmer; Leslie Moorhouse
- Cinematography: Vilis Lapenieks
- Edited by: Esther Poche; Ronald Thorne
- Music by: Bill Marx
- Distributed by: Headliner Productions
- Release date: 1961
- Running time: 74 minutes
- Country: United States
- Language: English

Walk the Angry Beach (also known as Hollywood After Dark and The Unholy Choice) is a 1961 American exploitation drama film written, produced and directed by John Hayes.

== Plot ==
It stars Rue McClanahan as Sandy, a stripper who aspires to become an actress but ends up being taken advantage of by the industry.

== Cast ==
- Anthony Vorno as Tony
- Rue McClanahan as Sandy
- John Barrick as Tom
- Paul Bruce as Nick
- Ernest Macias as Ernest
- Lea Marmer as Mrs. McVea
- Leslie Moorhouse as Shakespearean
- Doug Rideout as Fitz
- Joanne Stewart as Patti

== Home media ==
In 2006, the film was released as a double feature DVD with another McClanahan film, The Rotten Apple by Something Weird Video.

In 2007, it was featured as part of the short-lived Mystery Science Theater 3000 spin-off direct-to-DVD series The Film Crew.

== See also ==
- List of American films of 1961
- Girl in Gold Boots - 1968 exploitation film featured on Mystery Science Theater 3000
