= Blood Hook =

1987 film by Jim Mallon

- Video release poster
- Directed by: Jim Mallon
- Written by: Larry Edgerton; John Galligan
- Produced by: David Herbert
- Starring: Mark Jacobs; Lisa Todd; Patrick Danz; Sara Hauser; Christopher Whiting; Paul Drake; Don Winters
- Cinematography: Marsha Kahm
- Edited by: Marsha Kahm
- Music by: Thomas A. Naunas
- Distributed by: Troma Entertainment
- Release date: June 19, 1987 (New York City)
- Running time: 92 minutes (Note: The original theatrical cut of the film runs 92 minutes; however, an extended cut running 111 minutes also exists, and was issued in the film's Blu-ray releases.)
- Language: English
- Budget: $200,000

Blood Hook is a 1987 American slasher film directed by Jim Mallon and starring Mark Jacobs, Lisa Todd, Patrick Danz, Sara Hauser, and Christopher Whiting. It follows a group of young people who arrive in a small northern Wisconsin town during a fishing festival, where a series of bizarre disappearances and murders are occurring. It was distributed by Troma Entertainment. The film was premiered at the MIFED (Mercato internazionale del film e del documentario) Film Market in October 1986. The film was truncated for its 1987 release after the Motion Picture Association of America threatened to grant the film an X rating due to its violent content.

== Plot ==
While at his family's lakeside lodge in northern Wisconsin, six-year-old Peter van Cleese witnesses his grandfather mysteriously become overtaken by an apparent supernatural force while listening to a reel-to-reel tape player and fishing on the dock. He falls into the lake, and his body is never recovered.

Seventeen years later, Peter, now a recent college graduate, has inherited the lodge. He decides to travel there with his group of friends—Ann Colbert, Kiersten Knudsen, Rodney, and Tom 'Finner' Finnegan—for the first time since his grandfather's disappearance. The group arrive during "Muskie Madness," an annual fishing festival in the local community. At the lodge, the group are met by Wayne Duerst, a neighbor hired by the Van Cleeses to look after the property since Peter's grandfather's death. Wayne and his paranoid Vietnam veteran son, Evelyn, are hostile toward the group.

While Peter and his friends visit a local restaurant that evening, middle-aged tourist Sheila Swain is attacked on a nearby dock by an assailant who entangles her with a large fishing line and pulls her into the lake. The next day, Rodney and Finner become acquainted with young mother Beverly Duerst — Evelyn's wife — who helps to organize the fishing festival. Rodney visits a local fishing shop run by Leroy Leudke. Leudke tells Rodney a story about how Peter's grandfather and Wayne used to catch trophy fish by reeling them to shore and shooting them but stopped after Wayne accidentally shot Peter with a bullet. Meanwhile, Peter grows increasingly unnerved being near the lake where his grandfather drowned. Ann tries to comfort him and believes him to be experiencing post-traumatic stress disorder.

Rodney takes a boat out on the lake by himself, and is attacked by an unseen assailant, who castrates him with a large fishing hook before dragging him into the water with the fishing line. Police find the blood-soaked empty boat floating on the lake, and Peter insists that Evelyn is responsible. The local sheriff, however, attempts to stymie the investigation to prevent any disruption of the pending festival. A distraught Kiersten decides to relax by floating on the lake, but a large hook is thrown in her direction. Meanwhile, Finner and Beverly spend the afternoon together and become romantic.

That night, while the locals hold a contest to see who has caught the largest muskie, fisherman Roger Swain is stranded on the lake when his boat motor malfunctions. He sounds an emergency horn for help but is gored by a large fishing hook cast at his abdomen and pulled into the lake. Shortly after, Beverly goes for a swim alone and is also attacked with a large hook and dragged beneath the surface. Peter and Ann attempt to locate Kiersten. A ranting and raving Evelyn confronts them, informing them that Bev is also missing. Meanwhile, an intoxicated Finner takes a boat onto the lake, playing music loudly from a boombox. The music, combined with the incessant chirping of cicadas, drives Leudke mad in his nearby bait shop — the sound penetrates through a metal plate in his head, which he had implanted after suffering a brain injury in the Korean War. In a rage, Leudke casts a fishing hook at Finner and tears off his ear. Finner jumps into the water, but is accosted by a raving Leudke, who dismembers him and grinds his limbs up to be used for fishing bait.

A panicked, exhausted Kiersten finally returns to the lodge and tells Peter how she was attacked with a large fishhook and managed to elude it by swimming to the other end of the lake, where she became lost in the woods. Peter, a music major, eventually surmises that the sound of the cicadas combined with certain musical notes can create what is known as the "Devil's tritone," a frequency that has the ability to drive some people insane. Evelyn suggests that the metal plate in Leudke's head could amplify these sounds, which would become overpowering, a phenomenon he witnessed amongst his fellow veterans. Peter and Evelyn investigate Leudke's shack, where they find jars of human organs.

While Peter and Evelyn rush back to the lodge, Ann is attacked by Leudke while sitting alone on a dock playing music, and he manages to capture her and take her back to his bait shop. She tries to reason with him, to no avail, and he locks her in a refrigerator. Wayne teams with Evelyn and Peter to stop Leudke. The next morning at the fishing festival, when Leudke wins the contest, Wayne publicly accuses him of being the murderer, but the sheriff doesn't believe him. That night, Peter faces off with Leudke at his shack, severely injuring him with a treble hook, but Leudke manages to incapacitate Peter. Peter awakens in Leudke's shack and manages to free Ann. Leudke prepares to stab them both to death but flees when he hears police sirens.

At dawn Peter, Ann, and Kiersten leave town. Wayne and the sheriff search the woods for Leudke, but cannot locate him. The sheriff surmises he will likely die of blood loss due to his injury.

== Cast ==
- Mark Jacobs as Peter van Cleese
  - Ryan Franke as Young Peter van Cleese
- Lisa Todd as Ann Colbert
- Patrick Danz as Rodney
- Sara Hauser as Kiersten Knudsen
- Christopher Whiting as Tom 'Finner' Finnegan
- Don Winters as Leroy Leudke
- Paul Drake as Wayne Duerst
- Bill Lowrie as Evelyn Duerst
- Sandy Meuwissen as Beverly 'Bev D.' Duerst
- Dale Dunham as Denny Dobyns
- Paul Heckman as The Sheriff
- Don Cosgrove as Roger Swain
- Bonnie Lee as Sheila Swain
- Greg Nienas as Irving 'Irv' Swain
- Julie Vortanz as Ruth-Ann Swain
- Donald Franke as Hampton van Cleese
- Dana Remker as Dickie Duerst
- John Galligan as Emcee
- Ron Kaiser as Emcee

== Production ==
=== Filming ===
The film was shot on location in the community of Hayward, Wisconsin over a period of 35 days in the summer of 1985, on a budget of $200,000. The town's landmark giant fiberglass muskie is prominently featured in the film.

== Release ==
Blood Hook was intended to be released in 1986, but was delayed after the Motion Picture Association of America threatened to give the film an X rating, after which the producers truncated the film to eliminate portions of its violence and gore.

=== Home media ===
The film has been released on VHS by several companies including Paramount Home Entertainment and Troma Entertainment. It was released on DVD as part of the Troma Triple B-Header set in 2004.

In 2012 Troma posted the movie for free online viewing on their official TromaMovies YouTube channel.

In May 2018, a Blu-ray version featuring a new 2k scan of the original 16mm camera negative was released by Vinegar Syndrome, featuring an extended 111-minute cut of the film. The first 1,000 copies featured a limited edition slip cover. In January 2022, Troma Entertainment released their own Blu-ray edition of the film, also featuring the extended cut.
