= Kevin Murphy (actor) =

American actor and writer (born 1956)

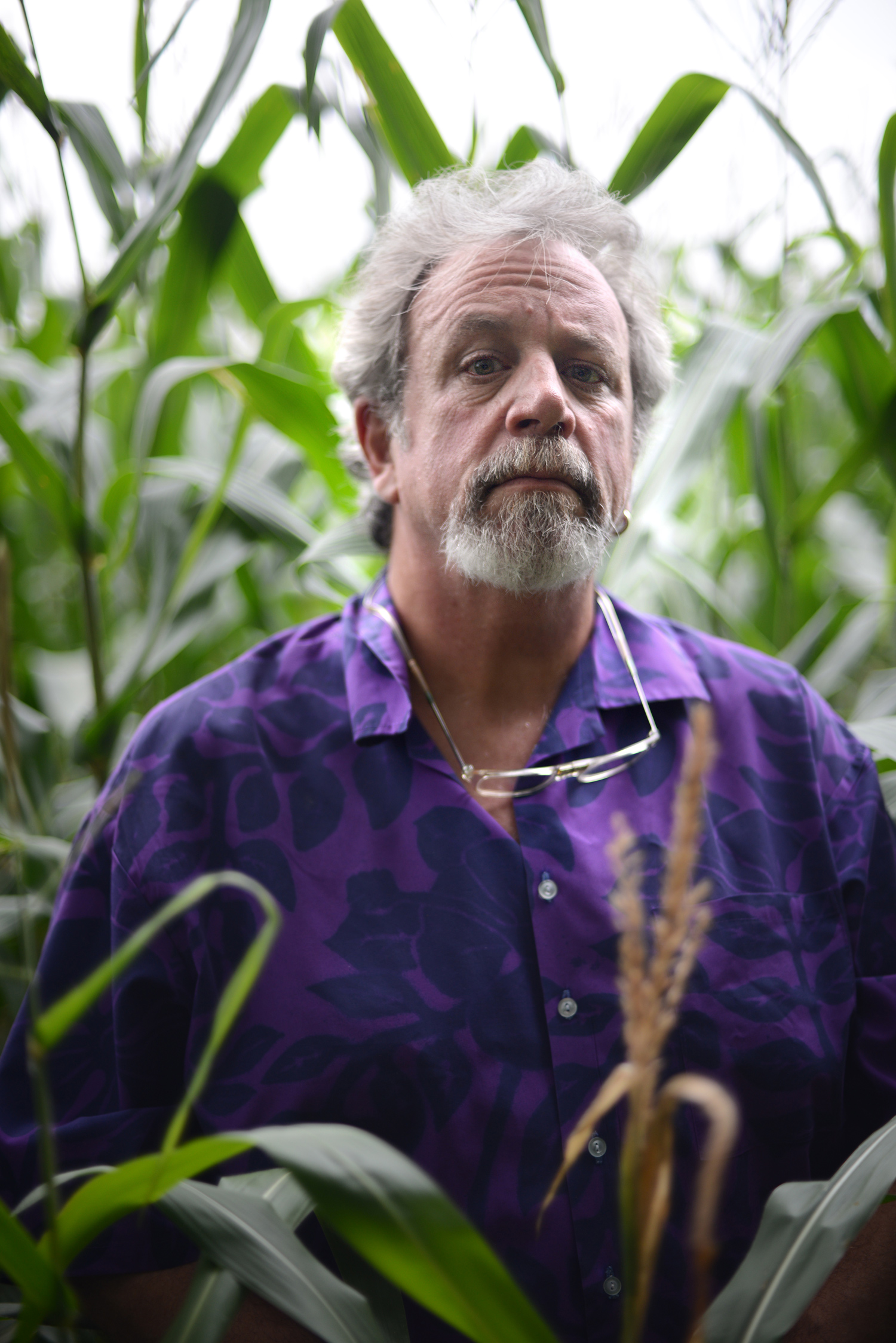
- Kevin Murphy in August 2012
- Born: Kevin Wagner Murphy; November 3, 1956 (age 70); River Forest, Illinois, U.S.
- Education: University of Utah (BA); University of Wisconsin (MA)
- Occupations: Actor, puppeteer, television writer, author
- Spouse: Jane Murphy

Kevin Wagner Murphy (born November 3, 1956) is an American actor and writer best known as the voice and puppeteer of Tom Servo on the Peabody Award-winning comedy series Mystery Science Theater 3000. Murphy also records audio commentary tracks with Michael J. Nelson and Bill Corbett for Nelson's RiffTrax website.

== Early life ==
Murphy was born and raised in the Chicago suburb of River Forest, Illinois. After graduating from the University of Utah with a BA in journalism, he attended the University of Wisconsin–Madison, studying stage, film and television directing, and earned a Master of Arts degree.

After graduation he worked on the staff of Madison PBS affiliate WHA-TV. Murphy's production work on Jim Mallon's 1987 horror film, Blood Hook, led to Murphy following Mallon to Minneapolis television station KTMA, where Mystery Science Theater 3000 began airing the following year.

== Career ==
=== MST3K ===
Kevin Murphy was a co-founder and co-owner of MST3K production company Best Brains, Inc. alongside Joel Hodgson, Jim Mallon, and Trace Beaulieu. For eleven years, Murphy was a writer for the series, as well as an associate producer for eight years and then producer for three years. He also was executive producer of The Mystery Science Theater Hour alongside Mallon and Beaulieu. For nine of those years, Murphy also voiced and operated the robot Tom Servo, replacing original cast member J. Elvis Weinstein. After taking over the role of Servo, an anonymous person sent him a 6-foot-long (1.8 m) banner that read "I Hate Tom Servo's New Voice". Flattered by the enormous amount of effort taken to heckle him, Murphy hung the banner in his office for over a year. During the final three years of the series, he additionally portrayed Professor Bobo, an English-speaking mountain gorilla in the style of Planet of the Apes.

After the end of MST3K, Murphy spent the year 2001 going to a movie every day and wrote a book about this experience, entitled A Year at the Movies: One Man's Filmgoing Odyssey. During his year at the movies, Murphy samples theatres from small-town boxes to urban megaplexes, attempts (and rejects) a theatre-food diet, suffers a kidney stone, visits both the Sundance and Cannes film festivals, sneaks Thanksgiving dinner into a showing of Monsters, Inc., and records all of these experiences, both good and bad. His feat – viewing over four hundred films on four continents – was mentioned in Ripley's Believe It or Not!.

=== RiffTrax ===
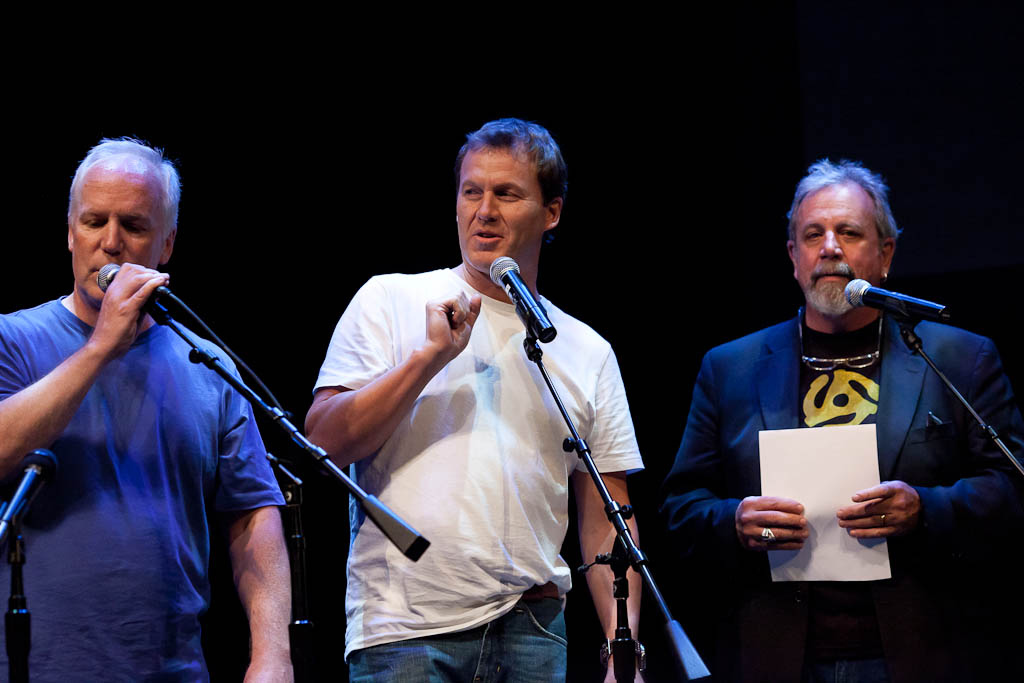
Murphy (right) with Bill Corbett and Michael J. Nelson performing at w00tstock in 2011

Since 2006, Murphy has joined Michael J. Nelson on many audio commentaries for Nelson's RiffTrax movie-riffing website, along with MST3K alumnus Bill Corbett.

He was notably absent from Joel Hodgson's Cinematic Titanic series, which included most of the original cast of Mystery Science Theater 3000. During a 2008 interview, Hodgson was asked if Murphy harbored any sort of animosity towards him or the Cinematic Titanic members; he responded: "I can't really speak for him. We saw him at ComicCon, and we did the Mystery Science Theater 20th anniversary panel, and he seemed totally happy to be there, willing to be there, but he's doing RiffTrax."

Murphy also did not appear in a 2008 reunion sketch, which otherwise featured all of the original cast members from the Comedy Central era reprising their roles (excluding Weinstein).

Hodgson participated in the 2016 RiffTrax Live: MST3K Reunion event, performing as a guest riffer alongside Murphy, Nelson, and Corbett. Trace Beaulieu, Frank Coniff, and Jonah Ray also performed.

=== Other work ===
In 2013, Murphy recorded a voice for the computer game Tesla Effect, playing Smart Alex, a Siri-like AI assistant that serves as a sidekick to the main character and heckles the player's failures.

== Personal life ==
Murphy resides in the Minneapolis-St. Paul area with his wife, Jane.

== See also ==
- Timmy Big Hands
- The Film Crew
