= Best Brains =

American entertainment company

- Formerly: Hair Brain Productions (1988-1989)
- Industry: Entertainment
- Founded: 1988
- Founder: Trace Beaulieu; Joel Hodgson; Jim Mallon; Kevin Murphy
- Headquarters: Eden Prairie, Minnesota, United States
- Products: Television programs, films

Best Brains, Inc. (first known as Hair Brain Productions) is an entertainment company based in Eden Prairie, Minnesota. It is best known for the creation and production of the comedy/sci-fi television program Mystery Science Theater 3000, A.K.A. MST3K (1988–1999). The company ceased producing the program when it was cancelled by the Sci-Fi Channel (now Syfy) in 1999 and closed its studio. The company then functioned as the holder of the MST3K brand for negotiating home video releases of the show on Shout! Factory and its availability on streaming services like Hulu until its sale of the MST3K property to Shout! Factory in 2015.

According to Joel Hodgson, the name "Best Brains" came from "...a phrase I found in a magic catalog. It was the old 'Vick Lawston' magic catalog. The copy read something like: 'from some of the Best Brains in the magic business!'"

On November 10, 2015, Shout! Factory announced it had purchased MST3K and its associated intellectual property from Best Brains for an undisclosed sum. On the same day, MST3K creator Joel Hodgson announced a crowdsourcing campaign to revive the program. The campaign turned out to be one of the most successful in Kickstarter history; a total of over $5.5 million was raised for the campaign, and the series made a return on Netflix with 14 episodes in 2017. Best Brains subsequently became known as Consolidated Puppets, Incorporated.
