= Michael J. Nelson =

American comedian and writer (born 1964)

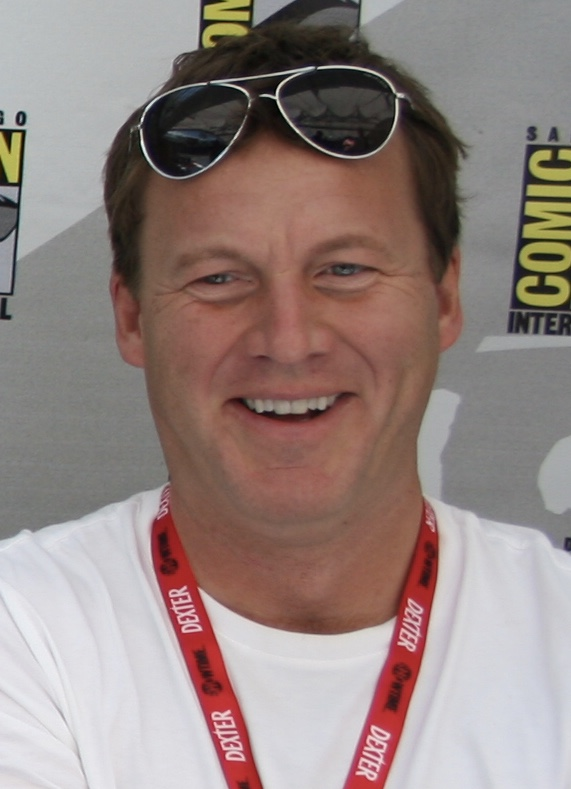
- Nelson at the 2011 San Diego Comic-Con
- Born: October 11, 1964 (age 61); St. Charles, Illinois, U.S.
- Occupations: Comedian; writer; actor
- Notable work: Mystery Science Theater 3000; RiffTrax
- Spouse: Bridget Jones Nelson (m. 1989)
- Children: 2

Michael John Nelson (born October 11, 1964) is an American comedian and writer, most known for his work on the television series Mystery Science Theater 3000 (MST3K). Nelson was the head writer of the series for most of the show's original eleven-year run, and spent half of that time as the on-air host, also named Mike Nelson. In addition to writing books, Nelson is currently part of the online movie riffing site RiffTrax, and was previously part of the straight-to-DVD Film Crew with fellow MST3K alumni, Bill Corbett and Kevin Murphy.

== Early life ==
Michael John Nelson was born in the Chicago suburb of St. Charles, Illinois. His ancestry is Danish, German, and Irish. He lived in Geneva, Illinois, until the age of twelve, when his family moved to north-western Wisconsin. He studied theatre and music at the University of Wisconsin–River Falls, but he left before graduating and moved to the Minneapolis–Saint Paul area.

== Career ==
=== Mystery Science Theater 3000 ===
Nelson was working as a waiter at T.G.I. Friday's and doing occasional stand-up comedy when he was offered a job on Mystery Science Theater 3000, typing the suggestions in the writing room. The writers told him to feel free to make some comments on the movies they were watching, and Nelson impressed them so much with his wit and comedic timing that they made him a staff writer, and, later, head writer. Nelson also appeared frequently in the show's host segments, often playing characters from the movies being mocked such as Torgo from the infamous Manos: The Hands of Fate.

When series creator and host Joel Hodgson left during the fifth season of Mystery Science Theater 3000, Nelson was his replacement.

=== Post-MST3K ===
Writing

Since the series ended, Nelson has worked steadily as a writer, publishing several books (as of March 2006): Mike Nelson's Movie Megacheese, Mike Nelson's Mind Over Matters and Mike Nelson's Death Rat!, the last being his first novel. His other works include a series of pop-culture humor books, Happy Kitty Bunny Pony, Goth-Icky, and Love Sick, as well as a monthly column for Home Theater Magazine. He also wrote for the short-lived game show Let's Bowl. He has commentary tracks for DVD releases of several films, including Reefer Madness, The Little Shop of Horrors, House on Haunted Hill, Plan 9 from Outer Space, Carnival of Souls, and Night of the Living Dead. With his MST3K co-stars Kevin Murphy and Bill Corbett, he was part of a comedy team called "The Film Crew", which has created comedy segments for National Public Radio. The first Film Crew DVD, Hollywood After Dark, was released July 10, 2007, and three more followed in the months after.

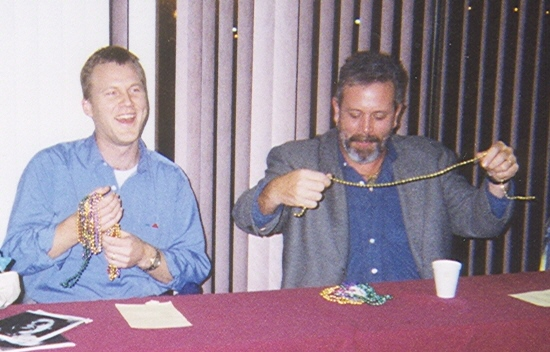
Nelson (left) and Mystery Science Theater 3000 co-star Kevin Murphy at a convention panel in Metairie, Louisiana, November 1998

Legend Films | RiffTrax

In 2006, Nelson was appointed Chief Content Producer for Legend Films. He is responsible for building and leading the company's creative content, providing continuous commentaries, and developing other premium web-based programming. "I'm very excited. Legend Films is such a great fit for me—talented people who consistently put out a great product. Plus, there are Flaming Hot Cheetos in the lunch room vending machine. That made it an easy choice to join the team," enthused Nelson.

One of the projects put together by Nelson and Legend Films was RiffTrax, a website offering the purchase of downloadable audio commentaries once again costarring two former MST3K cast members Kevin Murphy and Bill Corbett. The first commentary made available through the service was for Road House. In a September 2006 interview, Nelson said he felt that Rifftrax may be the closest thing to a reunion of the Mystery Science Theater 3000 team. In 2016, additional MST3K alumni, Joel Hodgson, Trace Beaulieu, Frank Conniff, Mary Jo Pehl, and Bridget Jones Nelson all appeared for a live reunion at the State Theatre in Minneapolis with Nelson, Murphy and Corbett. They were also joined by the newest host, Jonah Ray.

Voice work

In 2013, Nelson agreed to do voiceover work for Armikrog. Nelson voices the lead character, Tommynaut.

Podcasts

Since 2017, he has created, with Conor Lastowka, the podcast 372 Pages We'll Never Get Back, which analyses books of contested quality.

== Personal life ==
Nelson has described the role of Christianity in his family as "the very centerpiece of our lives. We're heavily involved in our church, my wife works with youth groups and churches as her profession, and almost every career and life decision I make depends upon it." He studies Christian apologetics and cites William Lane Craig and C.S. Lewis as influences.

Nelson has experienced chronic debilitating headaches for most of his adult life; he wrote a short piece about his experience for The New York Times in 2007.

== See also ==
- Timmy Big Hands
