= Jackson Airport =

Jackson Airport may refer to:

- F.H. Jackson Airport, Cypress, Texas, United States; renamed Weiser Airpark in 1963, closed 2019
- Jackson Municipal Airport (Alabama) in Jackson, Alabama, United States
- Jackson Municipal Airport (Minnesota) in Jackson, Minnesota, United States
- Jackson Hole Airport, Wyoming, United States
- Jacksons International Airport, Port Moresby, Papua New Guinea
- Jackson-Evers International Airport, Mississippi, United States
- Hartsfield-Jackson Atlanta International Airport, Georgia, United States
- Jackson Regional Airport, Jackson, Tennessee, United States
