= KMSP =

KMSP may refer to:

- The ICAO airport code for Minneapolis−Saint Paul International Airport
- KMSP-TV, a television station (Channel 9) licensed to Minneapolis/St. Paul, Minnesota, United States
- KMSP Tower, a high guy-wired aerial mast in Shoreview, Minnesota
