= Jackson Municipal Airport =

Jackson Municipal Airport may refer to:

- Jackson Municipal Airport (Alabama) in Jackson, Alabama, United States
- Jackson Municipal Airport (Minnesota) in Jackson, Minnesota, United States
