= MJQ =

MJQ may refer to:

- Manhattan Jazz Quintet
- Modern Jazz Quartet
- Jackson Municipal Airport (Minnesota) (IATA: MJQ), an airport in the United States
