= Leslie Brody =

American author

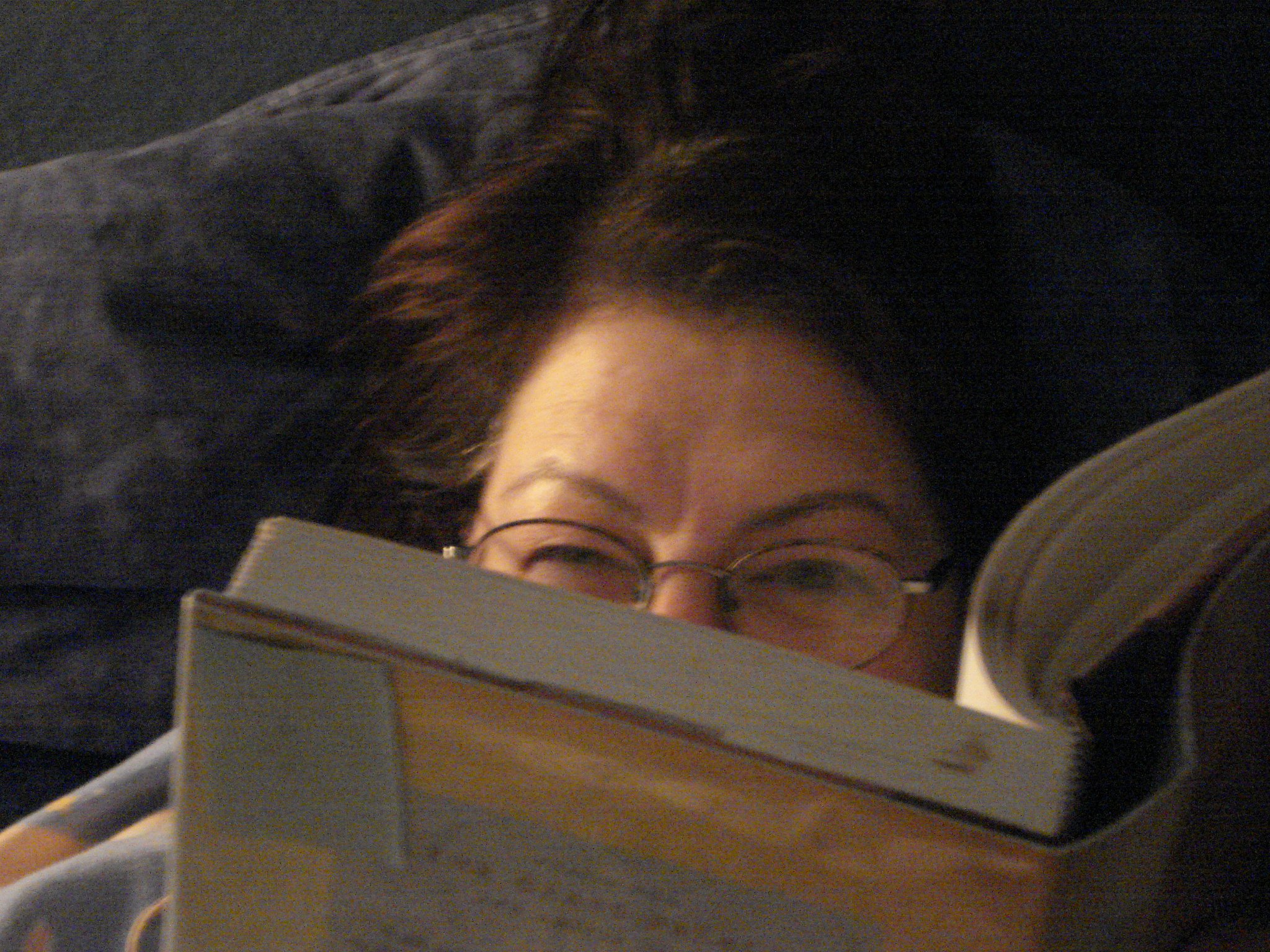
- Born: 1952 (age 73–74); The Bronx, New York, U.S.
- Occupations: Professor of English and Creative Writing at the University of Redlands
- Spouse: Gary Amdahl
- Writing career
- Notable works: Irrepressible : The Life and Times of Jessica Mitford
- Notable awards: PEN American Center USA West Award 1999, National Endowment for the Arts Award for Fiction

Leslie Brody (born 1952) is an American author.

== Early life ==
Born in the Bronx and brought up on Long Island, Brody went to grade school in Riverhead, New York and high school in Massapequa, New York. At 17 years old, she left home to become an underground press reporter for the Berkeley Tribe. A year later, she set off to travel around Europe. From 1971 to 1976, Brody lived in London and Amsterdam, sampling various hippie occupations. She returned to California in the late 1970s and worked as a librarian both at the San Francisco College of Mortuary Science, and for the Sierra Club, while attending college at San Francisco State University.

== Career ==
While in San Francisco, Brody became involved in theater and playwriting, and became a resident playwright of the One-Act Theatre Company of San Francisco. She was offered a fellowship at The Playwrights' Center and moved to Minneapolis. While there, she worked for the Hungry Mind Review as a columnist and contributing editor.

In 1993, she returned to college, this time at the University of Connecticut, Storrs, earning her PhD in English. Brody undertook various fellowships and assistantships and became part of UCONN's English department from 1994 to 1998. Ever since, Brody has been a professor of English and Creative Writing at the University of Redlands, primarily teaching non-fiction writing workshops in addition to seminars in documentary film, literary journalism and monologue writing for the stage.

Leslie Brody has been married to the writer Gary Amdahl since 1989.

== Books ==
- 1998 — Red Star Sister: Between Madness and Utopia (St. Paul, Minnesota: Hungry Mind Press)
- 2001 — A Motel of the Mind Written with Gary Amdahl (Santa Rosa, California: Philos Press)
- 2010 — Irrepressible: The Life and Times of Jessica Mitford, (Berkeley, California : Counterpoint Press)
- 2020 — Sometimes You Have to Lie: The Life and Times of Louise Fitzhugh, Renegade Author of Harriet the Spy, (California: Seal Press)
