= KEYQ =

KEYQ may refer to:

- KEYQ (AM), a radio station (980 AM) licensed to Fresno, California, United States
- Weiser Air Park in Cypress, Texas, United States
