= KPXM-TV =

Television station in St. Cloud, Minnesota

- St. Cloud–Minneapolis–St. Paul, Minnesota; United States
- City: St. Cloud, Minnesota
- Channels: Digital: 16 (UHF); Virtual: 41

Programming
- Affiliations: 41.1: Ion Television; for others, see § Subchannels

Ownership
- Owner: Ion Media; (Ion Television License, LLC)

History
- First air date: November 24, 1982
- Former call signs: KXLI (1982–1997)
- Former channel numbers: Analog: 41 (UHF, 1982–2009); Digital: 40 (UHF, until 2018)
- Former affiliations: Independent (1982–1988); Dark (1988–1990); Star Television Network (1990–1991); Independent/HSN (1991–1996); inTV (1996–1998)
- Call sign meaning: Pax Minnesota

Technical information
- Licensing authority: FCC
- Facility ID: 35907
- ERP: 470 kW
- HAAT: 289.4 m (949 ft)
- Transmitter coordinates: 45°20′11.9″N 93°23′31.2″W
- Translator(s): see § Translators

Links
- Public license information: Public file; LMS
- Website: iontelevision.com

KPXM-TV (channel 41) is a television station licensed to St. Cloud, Minnesota, United States, broadcasting the Ion Television network to the Minneapolis–Saint Paul area. The station is owned by the Ion Media subsidiary of the E. W. Scripps Company, and broadcasts from a transmitter located in Nowthen, Minnesota.

KPXM-TV also serves the Mankato market (via K20LP-D in nearby St. James through the local municipal-operated Cooperative TV [CTV] network of translators), as that area does not have an Ion station of its own.

== History ==
The station originally signed on the air in 1982 as KXLI ("XLI" is 41 in Roman numerals). The station branded as "K-41" and showed syndicated fare and cartoons. KXLI was also simulcast on KXLT-TV (channel 47) in Rochester, and by the late 1980s, Minnesota North Stars hockey broadcasts would also air on the stations.

KXLI and KXLT were owned by Halcomm Inc., whose majority stockholder and president was Dale W. Lang. Lang was also the chairman of magazine publisher Lang Communications Inc. Lang and several partners attempted to create the "Minnesota Independent Network" (MIN) with 11 stations, but this was never realized.

Lang also made a $9.6 million loan to Halcomm. When KXLI and KXLT closed down in December 1988, Lang called the loan a year later and took possession of the stations.

In 1989, Lang became the primary investor in a new television network based in Orlando, Florida, the Star Television Network. KXLT returned on September 29, 1990, again simulcasting KXLI programming as an owned and operated Star station. Both stations were broadcasting 22 hours a day with 10 hours from Star, which consisted of at least four hours of infomercials and eight hours of classic shows under the TV Heaven banner.

Following Star's closure in January 1991, KXLI/KXLT replaced its schedule with religious and infomercial programming, as well as programming from the Home Shopping Network, which continued through their purchase by Lowell "Bud" Paxson in the mid-1990s. Saturday afternoons during this time consisted of local and national hunting programs. Programming originated from the transmitter building during this time in Big Lake.

Once it was decided to bring back the moniker of TV Heaven, money was spent on a new building near the tower. TV Heaven was brought back with programs from the 1950s, '60s, '70s, '80s and some new shows during the '90s. It also had agreements to air programming from upstart conservative network NET (National Empowerment Television) run by Paul Weyrich. To that end, the stations nicknamed themselves the Political News Network. Late evenings were taken up by many different shopping networks.

In 1998, Paxson broke the KXLI/KXLT simulcast by selling KXLT to Shockley Communications, who converted that station into a full-power Fox affiliate for the Rochester–Austin–Mason City market; that station would replace two Minneapolis-based stations, WFTC and KMSP-TV, on cable and satellite providers in the Rochester market. Paxson also changed KXLI's callsign to KPXM, and the station would join the Pax TV network (later i: Independent Television and now Ion Television) later in 1998. The station also got a significant technical overhaul, replacing the 1970s-vintage La Kart tape switching equipment. It also moved to a new, much more powerful tower in Big Lake. It is the tallest structure in Minnesota, standing 1,505 feet (459 m) tall—nearly twice as high as the skyscrapers of downtown Minneapolis. The new tower more than doubled the station's coverage area, which was now comparable to those of the major Twin Cities stations.

KPXM originally had a marketing agreement with KARE (channel 11) in which KPXM repeated KARE's evening newscasts tape-delayed by half an hour, and also repeated KARE's morning show again in the afternoon. Similar arrangements were in place between other Pax and NBC stations across the country. This agreement ended in June 2005, when Paxson chose to end such agreements for all its stations.

In 2009 and 2012, the FCC authorized the station to move to a tower closer to the Twin Cities tower farm in Shoreview. However, that facility was never built.

During late May 2018, the station simulcast on RF channel 16 from the Anoka tower shared with radio station KQQL, encouraging viewers to re-scan their TVs. This change only affected those who use an antenna to receive KPXM. The station permanently moved to channel 16 on June 1, 2018, as part of the digital television repack. While both channels were still on the air, viewers saw two identical sets of channels. This move forced K16HY-D off the air in the Twin Cities, as that station broadcast from the IDS Center in downtown Minneapolis, and the two stations would interfere with each other. After the repack was complete, T-Mobile took ownership of the spectrum vacated by the station.

== Technical information ==
=== Subchannels ===
The station's signal is multiplexed:

Subchannels of KPXM-TV
Channel	Res.	Short name	Programming
41.1	720p	ION	Ion Television
41.2	720p	Bounce	Bounce TV
41.3	480i	Grit	Grit
41.4	480i	Mystery	Ion Mystery
41.5	480i	Laff	Laff
41.6	480i	CourtTV	Court TV
41.7	480i	Busted	Busted
41.8	480i	QVC	QVC

=== Analog-to-digital conversion ===
KPXM-TV shut down its analog signal, over UHF channel 41, on June 12, 2009, the official date on which full-power television stations in the United States transitioned from analog to digital broadcasts under federal mandate. The station's digital signal remained on its pre-transition UHF channel 40, using virtual channel 41.

On June 1, 2018, the station signed off its transmitter on channel 40, relocating to 16 permanently after moving towers.

=== Translators ===
The broadcast signal of KPXM is extended by way of five digital translators in central and southern Minnesota.

- K34AF-D Alexandria
- K30KQ-D Jackson
- K17BV-D Redwood Falls
- K20LP-D St. James (in the Mankato market)
- K26NU-D Willmar
