= Randy Meier =

American news anchor

Randy Meier currently anchors the evening news at KMSP-TV in Minneapolis/Saint Paul. On September 26, 2011, he began as the 10pm anchor while anchoring and reporting on the 5pm news. Meier previously served as an anchor for MSNBC for 3 years. He joined the network in 2003 from KSTP-TV in Saint Paul/Minneapolis, MN and exited on Friday June 23, 2006 after MSNBC decided not to renew his contract.

While at MSNBC, Meier was long-time host of the morning edition of "MSNBC Live".

Meier has received numerous awards for broadcast journalism. He received an Emmy Award in 2002 for his work on Oil Field of Dreams, an investigative report on the environmental impact of oil drilling in Alaska's Arctic National Wildlife Refuge. He has also received two Edward R. Murrow Awards and a Page One Award from the Society of Professional Journalists for Oil Field of Dreams. While at KSTP-TV, Meier received three other Emmys, the 2003 National Headliner Award for Best Newscast, and a National Iris Award.

Meier is a graduate from the University of Wisconsin–La Crosse and holds a bachelor's degree in mass communications.
