= Jeffrey Bullock =

American academic administrator

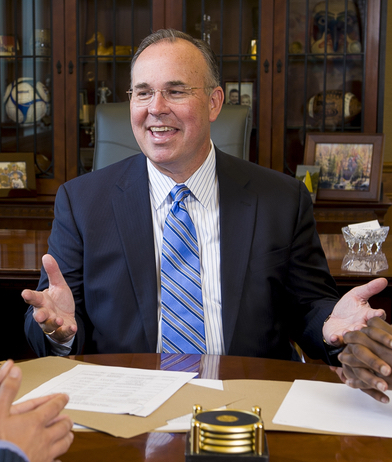

11th President of the University of Dubuque
- In office 1998–2024
- Preceded by: John James Agria
- Succeeded by: Travis L. Frampton

Personal details
- Born: Jeffrey Francis Bullock; August 12, 1959 (age 67) Ames, Iowa, U.S.
- Education: Jackson High School in Jackson, Minnesota
- Alma mater: University of Washington (Ph.D.)
- Occupation: Academic administrator

Jeffrey Francis Bullock (born August 12, 1959) is an American academic administrator and the 11th president of the University of Dubuque, a Presbyterian college in Dubuque, Iowa. He is also an adjunct professor at Seattle Pacific University.

== Early life ==
Jeffrey Bullock was born in Ames, Iowa, and raised in Omaha/Council Bluffs and Jackson, Minnesota. He is the son of Patricia Spangler Bullock and Robert W. Bullock and is a 4th generation Iowan.

== Education ==
Bullock graduated from Jackson High School in Jackson, Minnesota, in 1977 and Seattle Pacific University in 1982 with a BA in Sociology. He received his M.Div. degree from Pittsburgh Theological Seminary in 1985 and his MA and Ph.D. in Speech Communication from the University of Washington in 1994 and 1996, respectively.

== Career ==
Bullock was ordained at the First Presbyterian Church in Jackson, Minnesota.

In 1996, Bullock became dean of the Theological Seminary of the University of Dubuque. In 1998, he became president of the university, serving until 2024.
