= Shoreview, Minnesota =

City in Minnesota, United States

- City
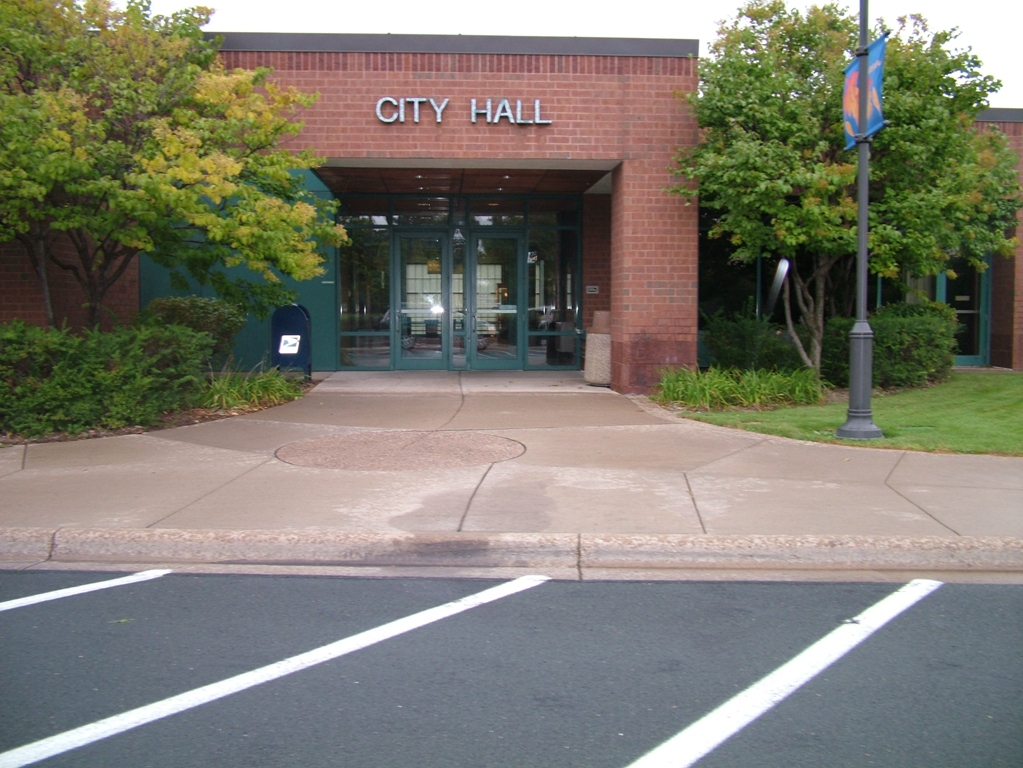
- Shoreview City Hall

- Flag Logo

- Location of the city of Shoreview within Ramsey County, Minnesota
- Coordinates: 45°05′03″N 93°08′07″W
- Country: United States
- State: Minnesota
- County: Ramsey
- Incorporated (city): April 23, 1957

Government
  - Mayor: Sue Denkinger (elected 2022)

Area
  - Total: 12.66 sq mi (32.78 km^{2})
  - Land: 10.77 sq mi (27.89 km^{2})
  - Water: 1.89 sq mi (4.90 km^{2})
- Elevation: 899 ft (274 m)

Population (2020)
  - Total: 26,921
  - Estimate (2022): 26,632
  - Density: 2,500.4/sq mi (965.42/km^{2})
- Time zone: UTC-6 (Central (CST))
  - Summer (DST): UTC-5 (CDT)
- ZIP code: 55126
- Area code: 651
- FIPS code: 27-59998
- GNIS feature ID: 2395876
- Website: shoreviewmn.gov

Shoreview is a city in Ramsey County, Minnesota, United States. The population was 26,921 at the time of the 2020 census. It is part of the Minneapolis–Saint Paul metropolitan area.

== Geography ==
According to the United States Census Bureau, the city has a total area of 12.67 square miles (32.82 km^{2}), of which 10.77 square miles (27.89 km^{2}) is land and 1.90 square miles (4.92 km^{2}) is water.

A second-ring suburb north of Saint Paul, Shoreview has nine city parks and three county parks. It has seven lakes, of which the largest are Turtle Lake, Snail Lake, Lake Owasso, and Island Lake, and Rice Creek flows through the northwest portion of the city.

Interstate 35W, Interstate 694, and County Highway 96 are three of its main routes.

== Demographics ==
Historical population
Census	Pop.	Note	%±
1960	7,157		—
1970	10,978		53.4%
1980	17,300		57.6%
1990	24,587		42.1%
2000	25,377		3.2%
2010	25,043		−1.3%
2020	26,921		7.5%
2022 (est.)	26,632		−1.1%
U.S. Decennial Census; 2020 Census

=== 2020 census ===
As of the 2020 census, Shoreview had a population of 26,921. The median age was 43.3 years. 21.5% of residents were under the age of 18 and 21.2% of residents were 65 years of age or older. For every 100 females there were 93.3 males, and for every 100 females age 18 and over there were 89.6 males age 18 and over.

99.8% of residents lived in urban areas, while 0.2% lived in rural areas.

There were 11,171 households in Shoreview, of which 27.8% had children under the age of 18 living in them. Of all households, 54.4% were married-couple households, 14.0% were households with a male householder and no spouse or partner present, and 26.6% were households with a female householder and no spouse or partner present. About 28.8% of all households were made up of individuals and 14.0% had someone living alone who was 65 years of age or older.

There were 11,552 housing units, of which 3.3% were vacant. The homeowner vacancy rate was 0.6% and the rental vacancy rate was 5.1%.

Racial composition as of the 2020 census
Race	Number	Percent
White	21,172	78.6%
Black or African American	984	3.7%
American Indian and Alaska Native	98	0.4%
Asian	2,761	10.3%
Native Hawaiian and Other Pacific Islander	10	0.0%
Some other race	323	1.2%
Two or more races	1,573	5.8%
Hispanic or Latino (of any race)	911	3.4%

=== 2010 census ===
As of the census of 2010, there were 25,043 people, 10,402 households, and 6,996 families living in the city. The population density was 2,325.3 inhabitants per square mile (897.8/km^{2}). There were 10,826 housing units at an average density of 1,005.2 per square mile (388.1/km^{2}). The racial makeup of the city was 87.4% White, 2.2% African American, 0.4% Native American, 7.2% Asian, 0.6% from other races, and 2.2% from two or more races. Hispanic or Latino of any race were 2.2% of the population.

There were 10,402 households, of which 28.5% had children under the age of 18 living with them, 56.5% were married couples living together, 7.9% had a female householder with no husband present, 2.8% had a male householder with no wife present, and 32.7% were non-families. 27.3% of all households were made up of individuals, and 9.7% had someone living alone who was 65 years of age or older. The average household size was 2.39 and the average family size was 2.92.

The median age in the city was 44.6 years. 21.6% of residents were under the age of 18; 7.2% were between the ages of 18 and 24; 21.8% were from 25 to 44; 35.1% were from 45 to 64; and 14.4% were 65 years of age or older. The gender makeup of the city was 47.9% male and 52.1% female.

=== 2000 census ===
As of the census of 2000, there were 25,377 people, Males: 12,303 (48.5%), Females: 13,074 (51.5%), 9,965 households, and 7,021 families living in the city. The population density was 2,315.9 inhabitants per square mile (894.2/km^{2}). There were 10,127 housing units at an average density of 919.2 per square mile (354.9/km^{2}). The racial makeup of the city was 93.28% White, 1.01% African American, 0.22% Native American, 3.65% Asian, 0.05% Pacific Islander, 0.44% from other races, and 1.35% from two or more races. 1.33% of the population were Hispanic or Latino of any race. Ancestries: German (38.3%), Norwegian (15.9%), Swedish (13.9%), Irish (13.9%), English (8.3%), Polish (5.5%). Median resident age: 39.3 years

There were 9,965 households, out of which 34.6% had children under the age of 18 living with them, 60.3% were married couples living together, 7.9% had a female householder with no husband present, and 29.2% were non-families. 24.1% of all households were made up of individuals, and 6.5% had someone living alone who was 65 years of age or older. The average household size was 2.54 and the average family size was 3.06.

In the city, the population was spread out, with 26.2% under the age of 18, 6.9% from 18 to 24, 28.6% from 25 to 44, 28.6% from 45 to 64, and 9.7% who were 65 years of age or older. The median age was 39 years. For every 100 females, there were 94.0 males. For every 100 females age 18 and over, there were 90.3 males.

== Economy ==
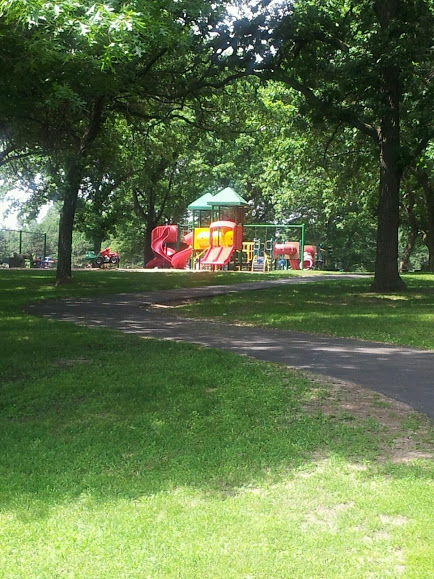
Shamrock Park in Shoreview

Land O'Lakes has a corporate office in Shoreview.

Shamrock Park services the residents of Shoreview as well as the larger Twin Cities community. It has numerous amenities, including picnic shelters, sporting areas including a soccer field, basketball court, hockey rink, tennis courts and baseball/softball fields. There is a trail system though the park, including around a small, leech-filled pond. There is also an interactive children's playground combining traditional play with natural play. The earliest reference to Shamrock Park is in the late 1840s. The land was then a popular resting place for Native American travelers and later a popular wagon trail to Duluth. Native Americans traditionally used adjacent marsh land for food and rice production. As the town grew, buildings around Shamrock Park emerged, including Willis Wilson's property that hosted the first meetings of the new mayor and community leaders. In 1885 Mark Twain stopped by Shamrock Park on his book tour promoting Adventures of Huckleberry Finn. Thereafter, the government shifted away from the Shamrock Park area and the residential community grew around it, embracing the park as an anchor for the city. In more recent years, Shamrock was host to a campaign stop by future President Ronald Reagan and many other events such as beer dabblers, weddings, ice skating competitions and frisbee golf tournaments. In 2004, the 3M Pavilion was constructed as part of an extensive park remodel.

== Government ==
The Shoreview City Council consists of a Mayor and four council members. The Mayor serves a two-year term of office, and the council members are elected at–large to serve overlapping four year terms. Shoreview has adopted the Plan B Council/Manager form of government, one of three forms permitted by the Minnesota State Legislature. The Council has policymaking and legislative authority and appoints the City Manager, who is charged with the administration of city business in accordance with council decisions. The Manager has the authority to appoint all employees and is responsible for the development of the annual budget.

== Education ==
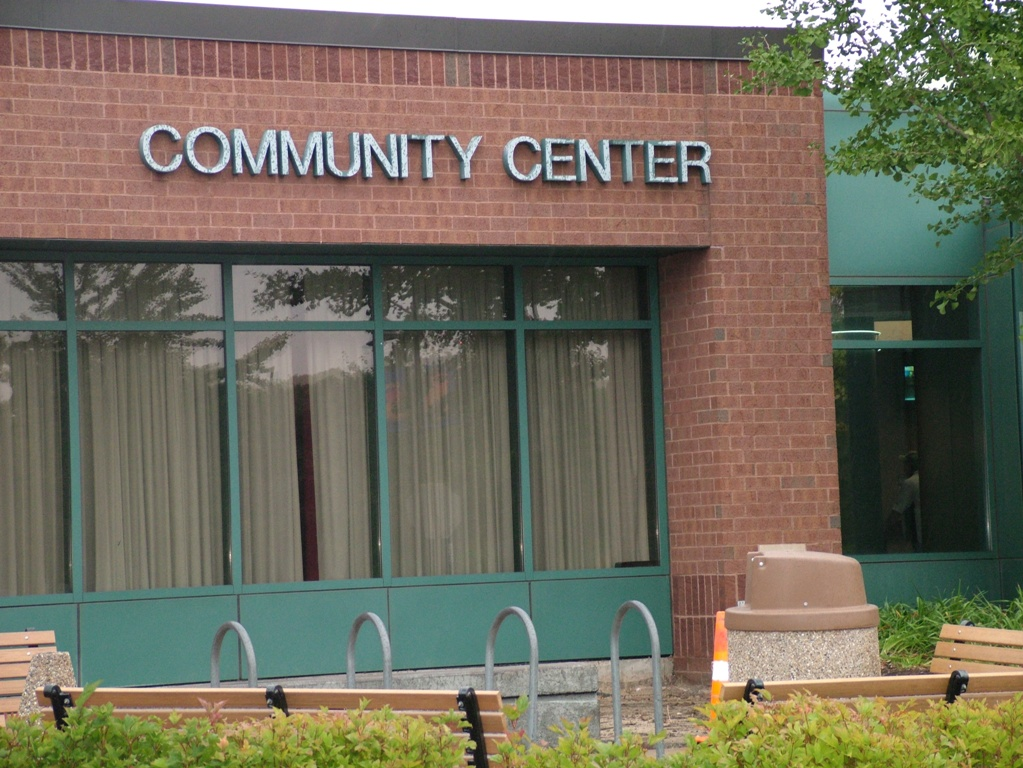
Shoreview Community Center

Two public school districts provide educational services to Shoreview residents: District 621 (Mounds View) and District 623 (Roseville).

The following institutions are located in Shoreview:

- Island Lake Elementary School
- Snail Lake Education Center (Kindergarten only- feeds to Turtle Lake and Island Lake Elementary Schools)
- St. Odilia Catholic School and Church
- Turtle Lake Elementary School
- Oak Hill Montessori
- Emmet D. Williams Elementary School

St. Odilia's, a private Catholic school, located next to Island Lake school, has a total enrollment of approximately 550 students in grades K–8.

== Media ==
The majority of FM and television broadcasters in the Twin Cities area have their transmitters and antennae based in Shoreview;

- The KMSP TV Tower, owned by Fox O&O duopoly KMSP/WFTC (Channels 9 / 29) stands 1,466 feet (447 m) high and is also utilized by the stations of Twin Cities Public Television (KTCA/KTCI 2 / 17), and ten FM stations.
- Telefarm Towers Shoreview are two towers nearby which reach 1,436 feet (438 m) and 1,438 feet (438 m) high, respectively. WCCO (4), KTSP/KSTC (5 / 45), KARE (11), WUCW (23) and KPXM (41) transmit from this site, along with several other FM stations.

Shoreview made national headlines in September 1971 when a television tower on the site of the current Telefarm Towers collapsed during construction, killing seven workers.

== Notable people ==
- Kyra Condie, Olympic rock climber
- Sam Hentges, Major League Baseball pitcher for the Cleveland Guardians
- Jesper Horsted, National Football League tight end
- Jennifer Mills, NPR producer and publisher of Jennifer Mills News
- Madelyn Reiter, businesswoman and member of the Minnesota Senate
