= KPXM Tower =

Aerial mast in Minnesota, US

Coordinates: 45°23′00″N 93°42′31″W

The KPXM Tower (formerly KXLI Tower) is the tallest structure in Minnesota, a guyed aerial mast rising 1,505 feet (459 m). It formerly transmitted the signal for KPXM-TV (virtual channel 41 (16 digital), which is an Ion Television network affiliate licensed to serve St. Cloud, Minnesota. The tower is located about halfway between St. Cloud and the core of the Minneapolis–Saint Paul area, near the city of Big Lake.

The tower was completed in 1982 and is the property of American Tower. KXLI was the call sign of channel 41, which signed on the air the day before Thanksgiving 1982, when the tower was built. It surpassed the height of the KMSP Tower, completed in 1971.

The tallest non-guyed structures in the state are the IDS Center (792 feet (241 m) or 910 feet (280 m) with rooftop antennas) and the Capella Tower (776 feet (237 m)) in Minneapolis.

== See also ==
- List of masts
