= Jack Horner (journalist) =

American sports journalist

Gordon John Horner (1912 – January 10, 2005) was a noted sports journalist who worked in the Minneapolis-St. Paul market of Minnesota. He participated in the first modern television broadcasts of KSTP-TV channel 5, appearing on the first fully electronic telecast in the state on December 7, 1947 (others had appeared on the mechanical TV station W9XAT in the 1930s). When the station began regular broadcasts in April 1948, he provided play-by-play for a televised baseball game between the Minneapolis Millers and a team from Louisville. Jack Horner also broadcast the first live televised game of the Harlem Globetrotters and provided one of the last interviews of Babe Ruth.

Horner began his career in radio, starting at KGFK in Moorhead, Minnesota in 1935. He worked at several stations in Iowa, Wisconsin, and North Dakota before moving to Saint Paul to work at KSTP in 1944. After working at KSTP for a decade, he moved on to KEYD channel 9 (now KMSP) as that station was beginning operations. By the 1960s, he was working for WTCN (today's KARE). Throughout his career, he was known as "Mr. Sports" and added colorful commentary to all of his work.

He largely retired from broadcasting in the late 1960s, spending time working for the local Chamber of Commerce and the March of Dimes. He retired from that work in 1977, but continued to periodically do announcing and voice-over work. Horner enjoyed being able to provide services for the blind. He has been honored by local media organizations, most recently by the Pavek Museum of Broadcasting in 2001.

== About ==
Jack Horner, "Mr. Sports," compiled one of the most impressive lists of firsts in broadcasting history, and has set high standards for those who followed him. His career began in 1935 at KGFK Moorhead. After working at WSAU Wausau, Wisconsin, KTRI Sioux City, Iowa, WTMJ Milwaukee, Wisconsin, and KFJM/KILO Grand Forks, North Dakota, he joined KSTP Saint Paul/Minneapolis in 1944 to broadcast University of Minnesota football games and other sports. On December 7, 1947, he hosted the first live television program in Minnesota history for KSTP TV. He also broadcast the first baseball game ever televised in Minnesota, the first no-hit no-run game ever televised, and the first televised appearance of the Harlem Globetrotters. He joined KEYD TV Minneapolis/Saint Paul (now KMSP TV) in 1954, then moved to WTCN TV Minneapolis/Saint Paul (now KARE TV). He did sports programming for Twin Cities radio stations WPBC, KJJO, and KFAN. He also was active as a volunteer, broadcasting a weekly one-hour sports show for Minnesota State Services for the Blind for over 20 years.
