= Jackson County Courthouse (Minnesota) =

- U.S. National Register of Historic Places
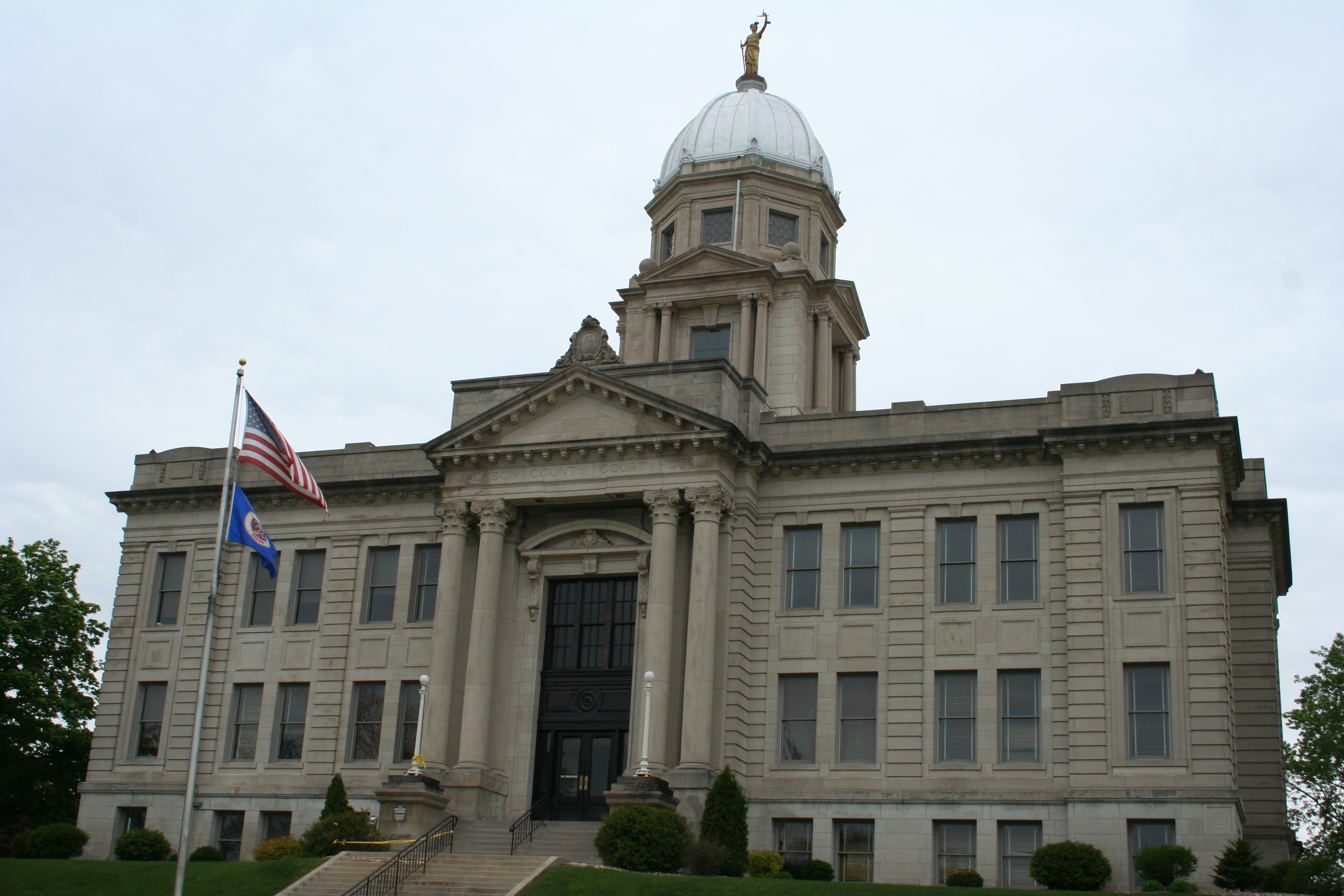

- Location within Minnesota Location within the United States
- Interactive map showing the location of Jackson County Courthouse
- Location: 413 4th St., Jackson, Minnesota
- Coordinates: 43°37′16.4″N 94°59′24.3″W
- Area: 1 acre (0.40 ha)
- Built: 1909
- Architect: Buechner and Orth
- Architectural style: Beaux Arts
- NRHP reference No.: 77000747
- Added to NRHP: April 13, 1977

The Jackson County Courthouse, located at 413 4th Street in the city of Jackson, Jackson County in the U.S. state of Minnesota consists of a Bedford limestone Beaux Arts courthouse featuring a high, segmented dome adorned with a cast statue of Lady Justice, columns supporting a gable overhang, a shield pediment, and symmetrical pavilions.

The building was built by Charles Skooglun of Saint Paul at a cost $117,435 in 1908-1909. The imposing structure is topped by a two-plus-story dome with stained glass windows. This sits over an octagonal atrium with terrazzo floors, marbled plaster walls, and a second-floor courtroom painted by immigrants with extensive murals; they depict scenes such as a frontier cabin, a railroad, Romans engaged in engineering and construction, and three women (justice, liberty, and equality) guarding a judge's bench.
