= WFTC =

Television station in Minneapolis

WFTC and KFTC

WFTC: Minneapolis–Saint Paul, Minnesota; KFTC: Bemidji, Minnesota; United States
- Channels for WFTC: Digital: 29 (UHF); Virtual: 9.2
- Channels for KFTC: Digital: 26 (UHF); Virtual: 26
- Branding: Fox 9+

Programming
- Affiliations: 9.1/26.1: Fox; 9.2/26.2: Independent with MyNetworkTV; for others, see § KMSP-TV/WFTC subchannels

Ownership
- Owner: Fox Television Stations, LLC
- Sister stations: KMSP-TV

History
- First air date: WFTC: October 6, 1982; KFTC: October 1, 1999
- Former call signs: WFTC: WFBT (1982–1984); KITN-TV (1984–1994)
- Former channel number: WFTC: Analog: 29 (UHF, 1982–2009); Digital: 21 (UHF, 2001–2009); Virtual: 29 (2001–2014); KFTC: Analog: 26 (UHF, 1999–2009)
- Former affiliations: WFTC: Independent (1982–1988); Fox (1988–2002); UPN (2002–2006); FoxBox/4KidsTV (secondary, 2002–2008); KFTC: Fox (1999–2002); UPN (2002–2006)
- Call sign meaning: WFTC: "Fox Twin Cities"; KFTC: "Fox Twin Cities"

Technical information
- Licensing authority: FCC
- Facility ID: WFTC: 11913; KFTC: 83714
- ERP: WFTC: 1,000 kW; KFTC: 4.5 kW
- HAAT: WFTC: 389 m (1,276 ft); KFTC: 156 m (512 ft)
- Transmitter coordinates: WFTC: 45°3′30″N 93°7′28″W; KFTC: 47°33′21″N 94°48′5″W
- Translator: see § Translators

Links
- Public license information: WFTC: Public file; LMS; KFTC: Public file; LMS
- Website: www.fox9.com

WFTC (channel 9.2), branded as Fox 9+, is a television station licensed to Minneapolis, Minnesota, United States, serving the Twin Cities area. It is programmed primarily as an independent station, but maintains a secondary affiliation with MyNetworkTV. WFTC is owned by Fox Television Stations alongside KMSP-TV (channel 9) and the two stations share studios on Viking Drive in Eden Prairie; WFTC's transmitter is located at the KMSP Tower in Shoreview, Minnesota. KFTC (channel 26) in Bemidji, Minnesota, rebroadcasts the main subchannels of WFTC and KMSP-TV, alongside a network of translators across Minnesota.

This station began broadcasting on October 6, 1982, as WFBT-TV on channel 29. Owned by Channel 29 Television and the Faith Broadcasting Network, it intended to be a family-friendly independent station with Christian ministry programming and classic TV shows. Ratings were low, and in 1984 the Beverly Hills Hotel Corporation acquired the station. It relaunched in May 1984 as a more conventionally programmed independent under the KITN-TV call sign. KITN became a major sports station under the ownership of Beverly Hills and Nationwide Communications, at various times in its history holding rights to telecast games of the Minnesota North Stars, Minnesota Timberwolves, and Minnesota Twins. In 1988, it became the Fox affiliate for the Twin Cities after KMSP-TV dropped the network over its underperforming Saturday night lineup.

Clear Channel Television acquired the station in 1993 and changed its call sign to WFTC ("Fox Twin Cities") in September 1994. WFTC was Clear Channel's largest-market TV station and, by 2001, its highest-billing. The station began airing a 9 p.m. local newscast in April 2001, but this was overshadowed by Fox parent News Corporation's acquisition of Chris-Craft Television, the owner of KMSP-TV. Speculation circulated for more than a year that KMSP-TV, with its existing news department and higher profile, would become the new Fox affiliate for the Twin Cities. This proved correct: on September 8, 2002, KMSP-TV became a Fox affiliate and WFTC a UPN affiliate. WFTC's news department was partially absorbed into KMSP's operation, with the 9 p.m. news moved to 10 p.m., but ratings fell even as they rose for KMSP's newscasts, leading to the cancellation of WFTC's news on June 30, 2006.

When UPN and The WB merged into The CW in September 2006, Fox's UPN stations were not invited, with competing stations in many markets (though not the Twin Cities) announced as affiliates. Fox started MyNetworkTV to serve stations not chosen for The CW, including WFTC. The station rebranded as Fox 9+ in 2017 and began airing a 7 p.m. local newscast.

== History ==
=== WFBT-TV: The Faith Broadcasting years ===
On November 30, 1976, Faith Broadcasting Network applied with the Federal Communications Commission (FCC) for permission to build a TV station on channel 29 in Minneapolis. It was the second application for the channel that year, after one by Buford Television of Tyler, Texas. Buford was interested in programming a subscription television (STV) station, while Faith was interested in a family-friendly independent station with Christian programming. Buford was the second group interested in STV in the Twin Cities. The first was Viking Television, the permitholder for KTMA (channel 23), which had been authorized in 1969 but was delayed by tower siting issues. In 1980, Faith Broadcasting Network opened a studio in Edina to produce programming for cable television.

In 1980, Buford Television dropped its bid for channel 29 and bought 80 percent of Viking Television, the channel 23 permittee. However, tower siting woes continued to snarl channel 29's attempts to get on air. The FCC in the late 1960s had required that the VHF television stations give room to new UHF stations that wished to broadcast from Shoreview, and KMSP-TV's mast was supposed to accommodate channel 23 and channel 29. However, when KSTP-TV obtained permission for a 274-foot (84 m) height extension to its tower (which also held WCCO-TV), only the KMSP tower was left out because it could not be extended with the UHF stations on it. This prompted KMSP-TV to rescind the agreement, resulting in legal action. Faith sold 90 percent ownership in the station, forming Channel 29 Television, to strengthen its financial qualifications and obtained a lease on the KMSP tower. The station was given a construction permit in July 1981. An attempt to locate the station's studios in a historic barn in Brooklyn Center fell through; channel 29 set up in a building in Brooklyn Park.

WFBT-TV ("We're Family Broadcasting for the Twin Cities") began broadcasting on October 6, 1982. Half of its programs were religious, with local Christian ministries and national producers from the Christian Broadcasting Network and PTL Satellite Network, while the other half consisted of shows deemed to be family-friendly. It was one of three television stations to debut in 1982 alongside KTMA and KXLI-TV in St. Cloud, Minnesota.

WFBT-TV made comparatively little impact on the Twin Cities television market. The combination format of Christian programming and classic TV series confused viewers and reduced potential advertising revenue. Some Christian viewers were displeased by programming such as The Merv Griffin Show, and the station's October 1983 telethon fell $80,000 short of its goal. Its highest ratings came from telecasts of Minnesota Golden Gophers men's hockey games.

=== "The KITN that Roars": Becoming a general independent station ===
In December 1983, the Beverly Hills Hotel Corporation (owned by New York City financier Ivan Boesky), agreed to purchase WFBT-TV from Channel 29 Television for $12 million. The company had entered the television industry earlier that year by buying Oklahoma City independent station KGMC-TV. The acquisition by Beverly Hills Hotel Corporation heralded a new direction for channel 29 as a more conventionally programmed independent station with a limited inventory of religious programs. The new ownership named Robert Fransen general manager; Fransen had been the manager of WTCN-TV from 1964 to 1980, mostly during its period as an independent.

The new ownership took over on May 1, 1984, and the station changed its call sign to KITN-TV ("Independent Twenty-Nine"). On May 6, the station launched a new program lineup with syndicated programming and movies. Beverly Hills Hotel Corporation sold KITN-TV to Nationwide Communications, the broadcasting subsidiary of Columbus, Ohio–based Nationwide Insurance, in 1985 for $24 million. The station called itself "The KITN That Roars"; one station promotion featured Oscar, a growling 115-pound (52 kg) pet cougar.

With its new orientation, KITN-TV became an aggressive competitor for sports rights. In 1984, channel 29 became the new home of Minnesota North Stars hockey telecasts that fall, airing a 25-game regular-season package and ending a six-year relationship between the team and KMSP. A bid to air Minnesota Twins baseball was unsuccessful, as the team renewed with KMSP. In 1985, it added Big Ten Conference football, followed the next year by a package of Minnesota Golden Gophers hockey and basketball events, outbidding KMSP-TV. The relationship with the University of Minnesota expanded in 1987, though channel 29 lost the North Stars to KXLI because the team was interested in reaching more fans in outstate Minnesota.

While channel 29 had become more aggressive, KITN-TV remained the second-rated independent in the Twin Cities. Hoping to spark a change, Nationwide dismissed Fransen in October 1987 and replaced him with Gail Brekke, who had been running WGBO-TV in the Chicago market.

=== Fox affiliation ===
When the Fox network began in 1986, its Twin Cities affiliate was KMSP-TV. The network offered programming by the 1987–88 season on Saturday and Sunday nights, but the Saturday night lineup was comparatively anemic. In December 1987, KMSP-TV owner Chris-Craft moved to cancel the Fox Saturday night lineup for KMSP-TV and KPTV in Portland, Oregon. Though Chris-Craft postponed the decision so it could meet with network executives, KMSP-TV dropped the Fox Saturday night lineup in favor of movies it believed would attract better ratings. Ultimately, KMSP-TV refused to give in to Fox's insistence that it resume airing the Saturday lineup and, on July 21, 1988, cut ties with the network effective at the end of August. KMSP and KPTV were two of three stations to disaffiliate from Fox after the 1987–88 season: Fox president Jamie Kellner told Variety, "Fox feels it's strong enough to say goodbye to the two United [Television] stations. We just weren't willing to accept half a marriage."

After the announcement, Fox began negotiating an affiliation agreement with KITN-TV. KITN-TV replaced KMSP-TV as the Fox affiliate in September, carrying the full network schedule. In 1989, KITN added two professional sports teams to its lineup. Under a deal with WCCO-TV owner Midwest Communications, channel 29 began airing 30 Minnesota Twins baseball games a year; with KSTP-TV, it split the rights to the NBA's expansion Minnesota Timberwolves, airing 17 games a season. That same year, the station lost University of Minnesota athletic events to WCCO-TV.

Nationwide Communications, citing "an offer we couldn't refuse", sold KITN to Clear Channel Television for $36 million in 1993. Clear Channel owned seven other TV stations, of which six were Fox affiliates. At the time, Minneapolis was the largest market in which the company operated in radio or television. With Fox's increasing network offerings, the station dropped its local sports coverage. The Twins remained on KITN through the 1993 season, after which time station management dropped them due to the increasing preemptions of network programming that baseball games necessitated and the games moved to KLGT-TV. The Timberwolves followed suit, with KLGT replacing KITN for the 1994–95 NBA season. On September 16, 1994, the station changed its call sign to WFTC, for "Fox Twin Cities", as part of a push to "Fox-ify and localize" the station. The call sign change came even though Rupert Murdoch visited KSTP-TV in hopes of persuading it to switch from ABC to Fox.

Rip Riordan was named channel 29's general manager after Clear Channel took it over and remained in the post until being promoted to head of operations for the entire station group, based in Minneapolis, in 1995. Riordan remained associated with the station. In 1997, an educational children's program, Algo's FACTory, was produced at the WFTC studios, with Riordan as executive producer; it aired nationally on UPN but in the Twin Cities on channel 29. Riordan's connections with the Minnesota Vikings football team, which at the time was facing ownership turmoil, led him to put the owners in touch with Red McCombs, who eventually bought the team in 1998.

In 1999, Clear Channel acquired the construction permit for KAGR (channel 26) in Bemidji from Media Properties Inc. The station began broadcasting October 1, 1999, as KFTC, a satellite station of WFTC.

=== News department launch and affiliation uncertainty ===
On April 26, 2000, WFTC general manager Steve Spendlove announced that the station would begin airing a local newscast in April 2001 from a new facility in Minneapolis. At the time, the station was the largest-market Fox affiliate that did not offer local news. While WFTC began taking steps toward local news, another development emerged. That August, News Corporation, the parent company of Fox, agreed to buy Chris-Craft, owner of KMSP-TV. Provisions in WFTC's Fox affiliation agreement gave Fox the option to move its programming to a station it owned without penalty, potentially leaving channel 29 without the network. In spite of the uncertainty, WFTC moved ahead with news department development, hiring a news director in November. To anchor its weeknight 9 p.m. newscast, the station hired people who mostly had prior experience in the market. Lead male anchor Chris Conangla had worked at KSTP after a stint at KCBS-TV in Los Angeles; sports director John Henk was a local native moving back to the market after 16 years in Sacramento; and meteorologist Karl Spring was a native of Hopkins.

Fox 29 News @ 9 debuted on April 23, 2001. It was the third 9 p.m. newscast in the Twin Cities after offerings from KMSP-TV, whose late newscast was among the highest-rated in the country, and KSTC-TV. In its first ratings survey, it captured 3% of the audience compared to 8% for KMSP. That July, the station signed a deal to become the over-the-air broadcast home of the Timberwolves for the first time since 1994, airing 35 games per season for three years.

The FCC approved News Corporation's acquisition of the Chris-Craft stations on July 25, 2001. Days later, News Corporation announced a station trade with Clear Channel by which it traded KTVX in Salt Lake City, a market where Fox already owned a station and thus had to sell, and KMOL-TV in San Antonio, Clear Channel's headquarters city, for WFTC, which had been Clear Channel's highest-billing TV station. This created a duopoly of KMSP and WFTC.

=== Affiliation switch to UPN ===
As had been expected since 2000, Fox announced on May 24, 2002, that Fox programming would move to KMSP-TV and UPN to WFTC on September 8. The changeover was timed to coincide with the first regular-season Vikings game of the year, aired by Fox.

Concurrent with the affiliation change was a restructuring of WFTC's news offerings. The 9 p.m. newscast—which had aired five nights a week—was replaced by a seven-day-a-week newscast at 10 p.m. This removed competition with KMSP, which at the same time dropped its newscast in that time slot. Though the two stations' newsrooms and other operations such as sales were combined at an expanded KMSP facility in Eden Prairie, leaving behind the leased quarters occupied by WFTC, the two stations retained separate news identities and their existing anchor talent. Channel 29 lost the Timberwolves to KSTC-TV after 2004, but it picked up a 28-game package of Twins games in 2005 as part of a five-year deal including the Fox-owned regional sports network Fox Sports North.

After the switch, the balance of news ratings and resources tipped toward KMSP, which experienced increases in ratings for its morning and late evening news and expanded to a 5 p.m. newscast under the leadership of news director Ted Canova. In November 2004 alone, KMSP added three percentage points of the viewing audience while WFTC lost more than half of its viewership. With low ratings and poor lead-in programming, the WFTC 10 p.m. newscast was discontinued on June 30, 2006, and replaced with a new newscast from KMSP that debuted on August 28. Conangla and Jordana Green, the channel 29 anchor team, were not retained, but 23 other WFTC news staffers were absorbed into the KMSP newsroom.

=== MyNetworkTV and Fox 9+ ===
Logo used as My29 from 2006 until 2017

On January 24, 2006, the Warner Bros. unit of Time Warner and CBS Corporation announced that the two companies would shut down UPN and The WB and combine the networks' respective programming to create a new jointly owned broadcast network called The CW. In unveiling the merged network, while WB and UPN affiliates owned by WB minority stakeholder Tribune Broadcasting and by CBS Television Stations were announced as affiliates, none of the Fox-owned UPN stations—many of which were competitors to these stations—were chosen. Fox president Peter Chernin moved immediately to remove all UPN branding from all of the company's stations. The next month, Fox parent News Corporation announced the creation of its own secondary network, MyNetworkTV, to serve its outgoing UPN stations as well as those WB and UPN affiliates owned by others that had not been selected for The CW. After the 2010 season, the Twins moved to a cable-exclusive package, with almost all games on Fox Sports North. The Timberwolves broadcast 10 games on channel 29 in 2010–11, none in 2011–12, and up to 25 in 2012–13.

From 2013 to 2016, WFTC broadcast a local entertainment program, On the Fly, late on weeknights. Hosted by local radio personality Tony Fly, the program featured interviews with celebrity guests and interactive segments. In 2016 and 2017, the station broadcast Minnesota United FC soccer, covering their last season in the North American Soccer League and first season in Major League Soccer.

On August 11, 2017, WFTC rebranded as "Fox 9+", a brand extension of KMSP-TV, and debuted a half-hour 7 p.m. newscast.

== Programming ==
=== Sports programming ===
In 2023, WFTC became the official media outlet for the University of St. Thomas Tommies athletics teams. The station broadcasts select home competitions for the football, men's and women's basketball, and men's and women's hockey teams. The Western Collegiate Hockey Association also reached an agreement with WFTC to carry a package of regular season games and the conference championship series; these games are simulcast with Big Ten Plus. That year, the Minnesota Aurora women's soccer club began airing select games on WFTC.

In February 2025, WFTC aired matches from the Coachella Valley Invitational preseason tournament featuring Minnesota United FC of Major League Soccer. Later in 2025, WFTC announced an agreement with the St. Paul Saints, the Triple-A affiliate of the Minnesota Twins, to air 11 games.

=== Newscasts ===
WFTC airs a 7 p.m. newscast, Fox 9+ News at 7, on weeknights.

== Technical information ==
=== KMSP-TV/WFTC subchannels ===
KMSP-TV and WFTC broadcast from the KMSP Tower in Shoreview, Minnesota. The signal of KMSP-TV contains six subchannels, while WFTC's signal contains four. All subchannels on both transmitters share the same major virtual channel of 9.

Subchannels of KMSP-TV and WFTC
Channel	Station	Res.	Short name	Programming
9.1	WFTC	720p	FOX-9	Fox (KMSP-TV simulcast)
9.2	WFTC	720p	FOX9 +	Main WFTC programming
9.3	WFTC	480i	Movies!	Movies!
9.4	KMSP-TV	480i	BUZZR	Buzzr
9.5	KMSP-TV	480i	QVC	QVC
9.6	KMSP-TV	480i	CATCHY	Catchy Comedy
9.7	WFTC	720p	FoxWX	Fox Weather
9.8	KMSP-TV	720p	Stories	Story Television
9.9	KMSP-TV	720p	Fox 9	Fox
9.10	KMSP-TV	720p	FOX 9+	Simulcast of WFTC

The WFTC transmitter also broadcasts two subchannels of WUCW (23.2 Comet and 23.6 Antenna TV), the market's ATSC 3.0 (NextGen TV) host station.

In November 2009, KMSP was added to a subchannel of WFTC and vice versa, to aid viewers that had difficulty receiving KMSP's signal on the VHF band. Beginning June 24, 2014, subchannels of WFTC began using major channel 9, with 29.1 changed to 9.2, and KMSP-TV began broadcasting in high definition from the WFTC transmitter on channel 9.1.

=== KFTC subchannels ===
KFTC is broadcast from a transmitter northeast of Bemidji.

Subchannels of KFTC
Subchannel	Res.	Short name	Programming
26.1	720p	Fox	Fox (KMSP-TV)
26.2	720p	Fox9Plu	Main WFTC programming
26.3	480i	Movies!	Movies!
26.4	720p	FoxWX	Fox Weather

KFTC also broadcasts 23.2 Comet and 23.6 Antenna TV from WUCW.

KFTC began providing high-definition service for the main KMSP and WFTC subchannels in October 2014. Translators of KMSP in Brainerd and Walker were switched to KFTC, making WFTC available over-the-air in those communities for the first time.

=== Analog-to-digital conversion ===
On February 5, 2009, WFTC's Bemidji-based satellite station KFTC began broadcasting its signal in digital only. WFTC shut down its analog signal, over UHF channel 29, on June 12, 2009, the official date on which full-power television stations in the United States transitioned from analog to digital broadcasts under federal mandate. The station's digital signal relocated from its pre-transition UHF channel 21 to former UHF analog channel 29 for post-transition operations on August 18. KFTC, which did not receive a companion digital channel prior to the digital transition, flash-cut to digital on its former analog channel assignment of UHF channel 26.

=== Translators ===
In addition to the main transmitter in Shoreview and KFTC in Bemidji, the signals of KMSP-TV and WFTC signal are relayed to outlying parts of Minnesota through a network of translators. The main channels of each station are available from all translators.

The following translators rebroadcast WFTC:

- Alexandria: K32EB-D
- Frost: K29IF-D
- Jackson: K34NU-D
- Olivia: K34OZ-D
- Redwood Falls: K19CV-D
- St. James: K23MF-D
- Walker: K21HX-D
- Willmar: K36OL-D

The following translators rebroadcast KMSP-TV:

- Alexandria: K30AF-D
- Frost: K19LJ-D
- Jackson: K31NT-D
- St. James: K16CG-D
- Willmar: K30FZ-D

The following translators rebroadcast KFTC:

- Brainerd: K20NH-D
- Red Lake: K34NP-D
- Walker: K21HX-D (26.1 through 26.3 as 21.1 through 21.3)

== See also ==
- KFBT in Las Vegas, a station started by Faith Broadcasting Network after it sold WFBT-TV
