= Jennifer Mills News =

American newspaper published by and about Jennifer Mills

- Type: Weekly newspaper
- Publisher: Jennifer Mills
- Editor: Jennifer Mills
- Founded: 2002
- Language: English
- Website: jennifermillsnews.tumblr.com

Jennifer Mills News is an American weekly one-page newspaper published by, and about, Jennifer Mills. Since it was founded in 2002, Jennifer Mills News has remained focused on mundane aspects of Mills' life, such as "Woman Explores Vacuum Repair Options" and "Woman Pours Seltzer into another Container to Keep it Fizzy".

== Background ==
Jennifer Mills (born December 1984) is a writer and producer for the NPR show Wait Wait... Don't Tell Me! From 2016 to 2018, she worked in the graphic department at The Late Show with Stephen Colbert, where she created over-the-shoulder collages for the show's comedy segments.

Mills grew up in Shoreview, Minnesota before attending Concordia College. In 2011, she earned an MFA from the School of the Art Institute of Chicago. She lives in Brooklyn.

== History ==
On September 13, 2002, a 17-year-old Mills created a one-page newspaper about her day in the computer lab at Perpich Arts High School. The lead story was headlined "Breakfast News" and recounted Mills had eaten a cranberry-orange bagel but accidentally burned it by setting her toaster to shade four instead of three. She printed eleven copies and distributed them to teachers, friends, and family.

Early editions of the newspaper were created "anywhere that had free printing privileges", Mills recalled in The New Yorker; this predominantly meant Concordia College's computer lab at night. She taped issues in bathroom stalls, then began emailing them to readers via Word document. More recent editions are posted on the News' Tumblr page.

Issues are usually released every week, though have sometimes been inconsistent; none were published between May 25, 2012 and September 17, 2014, a gap which Mills attributed to her "first real job".

In February 2017, Mills published "Bad Poems Happen to Good People: 200 Poems (Rounded up to the Nearest 200)", an anthology of poetry that appeared in the News.

== Content ==
Mills is the sole reporter, editor, and designer for each issue; she is also the only source. Per Jennifer Mills News style, the first mention of Mills in each article is followed by her current age. She creates each issue in less than 45 minutes, proofing at the end with a single copy edit.

The masthead of Jennifer Mills News featured the slogan "News you can uze since 2002". Since Volume 22, Issue 7 (Oct 13, 2023), the slogan has changed to "Trusted jurnalism since 2002!". The format is three columns on A4 paper, the third of which features a "poetry corner" with poems by Mills.

Articles in the News cover mundane moments in Mills' life, such as cooking, shopping, self-hygiene, travel, and social life. The May 5, 2023 issue included stories with the headlines "Woman Watches Two Basketball Movies In One Week", "Woman Finds Perfect Pillow Placement For Sleeping", and "Cabbage Stew Makes Huge Comeback For Woman".

Mills avows that "every article is true".

== Reception ==
In March 2023, The Brick Theater's Brick Aux Gallery in Williamsburg, Brooklyn staged an exhibition featuring 21 years of the Jennifer Mills News. In a Jennifer Mills News article headlined "Woman Displays All 21 Years of This Newsletter", Mills commented that "let's just say I can't wait to use my printer to print them all" and that she planned to use a high-quality tape to attach issues to the wall. The exhibition featured every issue except for one, which Mills said she could not find.

In October 2023, Mills and the Jennifer Mills News were featured in a BBC Radio 4 documentary.
