= Gary Amdahl =

American author (born 1956)

- Born: August 4, 1956 (age 70); Jackson, Minnesota
- Spouse: Leslie Brody
- Writing career
- Notable works: Visigoth, Across My Big Brass Bed
- Notable awards: Pushcart Prize in 2000, Milkweed National Fiction Prize in 2006, Jerome Fellowship, Playwrights' Center in 1980 and 1981

Gary Byrdelle Amdahl is an American author, born August 4, 1956, in Jackson, Minnesota. He attended public schools, graduating from Robbinsdale High School in 1974.

Amdahl has published six books, and produced nine plays. He was awarded two Jerome Fellowships at The Playwrights' Center in Minneapolis, and was a participant in Midwest Playlabs in 1985. His stories, essays, poetry (original, translated, and set to music), book and theater reviews, literary feature articles, and interviews have appeared in Agni, A Public Space, The Massachusetts Review, The Gettysburg Review, Fiction, The Quarterly, Santa Monica Review, Spolia, Third Bed, Minnetonka Review, New York Times Book Review, Los Angeles Times Book Review, Los Angeles Review of Books, The Nation, The Washington Post, The Boston Globe, Zyzzyva, Rain Taxi, and many other monthlies, weeklies, and dailies.

Amdahl has been married to author Leslie Brody since 1989.

== Books ==
- A Motel of the Mind with Leslie Brody (2001, Philos Press, ISBN 9780967931524 )
- Visigoth (2006, Milkweed Editions, winner of ME National Fiction Prize, ISBN 9781571310514 )
- I Am Death (2008, Milkweed Editions, ISBN 9781571310712 )
- The Intimidator Still Lives in Our Hearts (2013, Artistically Declined Press, ISBN 9781467558549 )
- Across My Big Brass Bed (2014, Artistically Declined Press, ISBN 1467598968, reissued 2024, corona\samizdat, ISBN 9789619610725 )
- Much Ado About Everything: Oration on the Dignity of the Novelist (2016, Massachusetts Review Working Title)
- The Daredevils (2016, Counterpoint/Soft Skull, ISBN 9781593766290 )
- The Creative Writers (2024, Galleon Books, ISBN 9781998122127 )

== Plays ==
- Going Down (1980, Gustavus Adolphus College)
- Fall Down Go Boom (1981, Illusion Theater)
- Dead Hand (1981, Brass Tacks Theater Collective)
- Tonight's the Night (1984, Playwrights' Center)
- Muzzle Flash (1984, Playwrights' Center)
- The Border (1985, Playwrights' Center)
- Hawaii (1985, Midwest Playlabs)
- The Articulate Noose (1987, Red Eye Theater)
- Getting the Hell Out of Dodge (1989, Actors Theater of Saint Paul)
- Far from Heaven, Safe from Hell (2017, finalist at the O'Neill Center's New Play Workshop)
