= Jackson, Minnesota =

City in Minnesota, United States

- City
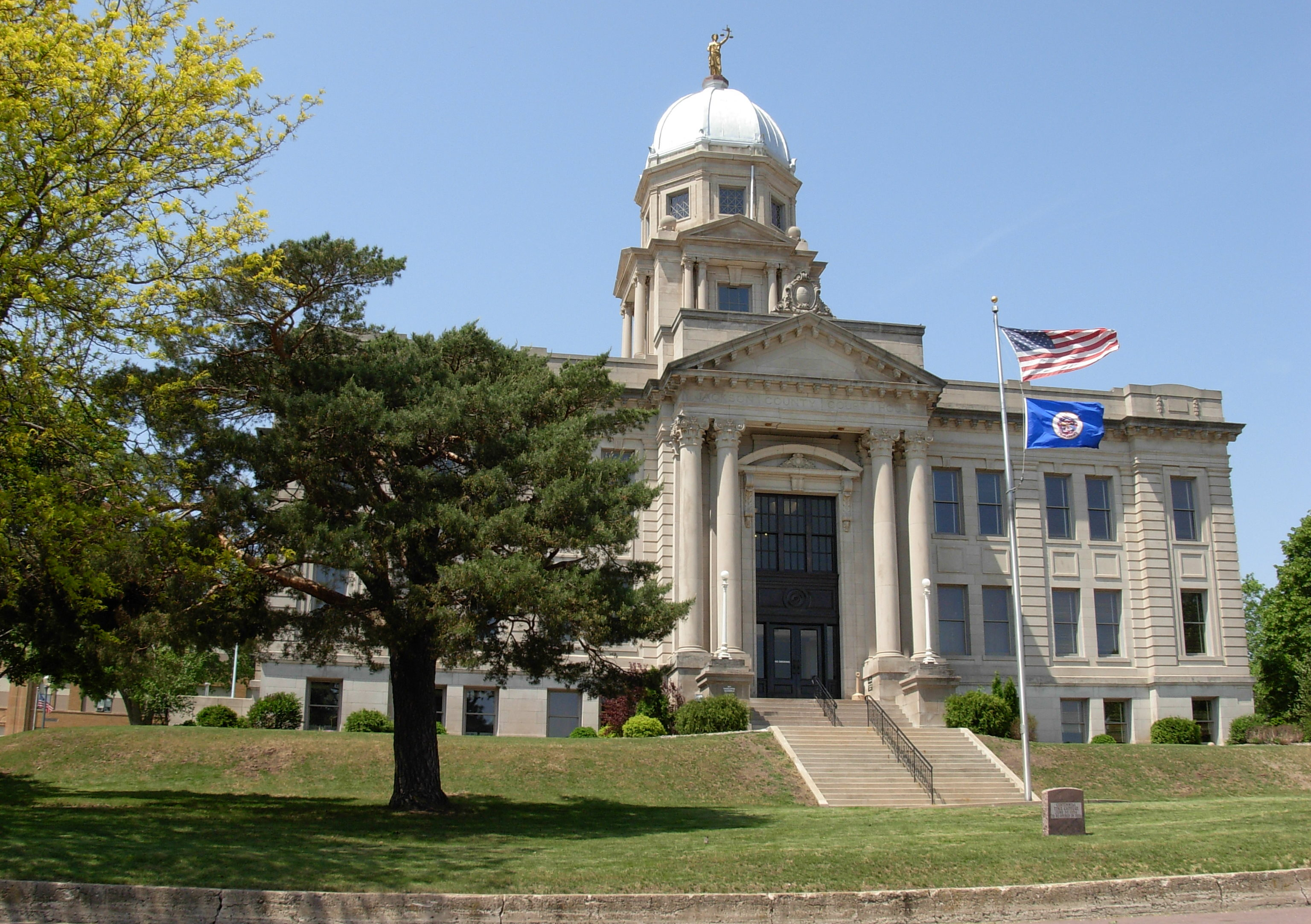
- Jackson County Courthouse in Jackson
- Motto: "Come Grow With Us"
- Location of Jackson within Jackson County and state of Minnesota
- Coordinates: 43°37′15″N 94°59′19″W
- Country: United States
- State: Minnesota
- County: Jackson

Government
  - Type: Mayor – Council
  - Mayor: Marcus Polz

Area
  - Total: 5.22 sq mi (13.53 km^{2})
  - Land: 5.19 sq mi (13.45 km^{2})
  - Water: 0.031 sq mi (0.08 km^{2})
- Elevation: 1,312 ft (400 m)

Population (2020)
  - Total: 3,323
  - Density: 640.1/sq mi (247.14/km^{2})
- Time zone: UTC-6 (Central (CST))
  - Summer (DST): UTC-5 (CDT)
- ZIP code: 56143
- Area code: 507
- FIPS code: 27-31562
- GNIS feature ID: 2395448
- Website: cityofjacksonmn.com

Jackson is a city in and the county seat of Jackson County, Minnesota, United States. The population was 3,323 at the 2020 census.

== History ==
For centuries, many indigenous peoples called this area home, including the Cheyenne, Ioway, and Dakota tribes. In 1851, the Treaty of Traverse des Sioux opened the region to white settlement in exchange for government payments.

Jackson was originally called Springfield, and was laid out under that name in 1856. The first settlers in what is now Jackson County—William, George, and Charles Wood—established a trading post near the Des Moines River around the same time. A post office called Jackson has been in operation since 1858.

On March 26, 1857, the Wahpekute Dakota Chief Inkpaduta and his band attacked the settlement in the Spirit Lake Massacre. There were 11 able-bodied men in Springfield, and three men, three children, and a woman died in the attack. Also lost to the raiders were 12 horses, dry goods, lead and powder. The attack's sole survivor was 14-year-old Abbie Gardner. Terrified of a possible second attack, the beleaguered residents abandoned the area.

Two months later, the Minnesota legislature organized the area into a county, naming it after Saint Paul merchant Henry Jackson. The temporary county seat was at the townsite of Springfield, now renamed Jackson. But the area was still depopulated, and resettlement was slow due to continued hostility. In August 1862, the Dakota, angry at late payments from the government, skirmished with settlers; one such skirmish compelled some Dakota leaders to attack government buildings in the Minnesota River, starting the U.S.-Dakota War. By August 24, the war's effects had reached Jackson County. Warriors raided a community of Norwegian immigrants in Belmont Township, north of Jackson, killing 13 and wounding three. As in 1857, the remaining settlers fled, leaving Jackson County depopulated again.

After the Civil War, resettlement in Jackson County began again. A stockade was built on the east side of the river, encouraging further immigration. Immigrants came mainly from northern and central Europe. They built homes from native timber and prairie sod. Life remained difficult; there were no wagon roads, no bridges, no churches, and only one school. The threat of attack remained, and the region was susceptible to disasters, including prairie fires, severe blizzards, crop failures, and plagues of grasshoppers. But the pioneers survived and helped establish the agricultural and industrial community Jackson is today.

== Geography ==
According to the United States Census Bureau, the city has an area of 4.60 square miles (11.91 km^{2}), of which 4.58 square miles (11.86 km^{2}) is land and 0.02 square miles (0.05 km^{2}) is water.

The city lies along Interstate 90, which runs east to west the entire width of Minnesota. Interstate 90 and U.S. Highway 71 are two of the main routes in the city. Jackson is near the center of Jackson County. To the south is the Iowa Lakes region, which comprises Spirit Lake, West Okoboji Lake, and several other small lakes.

== Demographics ==
Historical population
| Census | Pop. | Note | %± |
|---|---|---|---|
| 1880 | 501 | | — |
| 1890 | 720 | | 43.7% |
| 1900 | 1,756 | | 143.9% |
| 1910 | 1,907 | | 8.6% |
| 1920 | 2,144 | | 12.4% |
| 1930 | 2,206 | | 2.9% |
| 1940 | 2,840 | | 28.7% |
| 1950 | 3,313 | | 16.7% |
| 1960 | 3,370 | | 1.7% |
| 1970 | 3,550 | | 5.3% |
| 1980 | 3,797 | | 7.0% |
| 1990 | 3,559 | | −6.3% |
| 2000 | 3,501 | | −1.6% |
| 2010 | 3,299 | | −5.8% |
| 2020 | 3,323 | | 0.7% |
U.S. Decennial Census

=== 2020 census ===
As of the 2020 census, Jackson had a population of 3,323. The median age was 39.9 years. 22.8% of residents were under the age of 18 and 20.6% of residents were 65 years of age or older. For every 100 females there were 97.3 males, and for every 100 females age 18 and over there were 98.5 males age 18 and over.

100.0% of residents lived in rural areas.

There were 1,526 households in Jackson, of which 26.1% had children under the age of 18 living in them. Of all households, 38.8% were married-couple households, 24.4% were households with a male householder and no spouse or partner present, and 28.8% were households with a female householder and no spouse or partner present. About 38.7% of all households were made up of individuals and 16.3% had someone living alone who was 65 years of age or older.

There were 1,704 housing units, of which 10.4% were vacant. The homeowner vacancy rate was 1.4% and the rental vacancy rate was 11.4%.

Racial composition as of the 2020 census
| Race | Number | Percent |
|---|---|---|
| White | 2,881 | 86.7% |
| Black or African American | 82 | 2.5% |
| American Indian and Alaska Native | 18 | 0.5% |
| Asian | 86 | 2.6% |
| Native Hawaiian and Other Pacific Islander | 0 | 0.0% |
| Some other race | 68 | 2.0% |
| Two or more races | 188 | 5.7% |
| Hispanic or Latino (of any race) | 140 | 4.2% |

=== 2010 census ===
As of the census of 2010, there were 3,299 people, 1,489 households, and 856 families living in the city. The population density was 720.3 inhabitants per square mile (278.1/km^{2}). There were 1,635 housing units at an average density of 357.0 per square mile (137.8/km^{2}). The racial makeup of the city was 93.3% White, 0.5% African American, 0.4% Native American, 3.4% Asian, 0.8% from other races, and 1.6% from two or more races. Hispanic or Latino of any race were 1.8% of the population.

There were 1,509 households, of which 27.2% had children under the age of 18 living with them, 42.6% were married couples living together, 10.3% had a female householder with no husband present, 4.5% had a male householder with no wife present, and 42.5% were non-families. 37.9% of all households were made up of individuals, and 16.1% had someone living alone who was 65 years of age or older. The average household size was 2.17 and the average family size was 2.84.

The median age in the city was 40.8 years. 22.7% of residents were under the age of 18; 8.4% were between the ages of 18 and 24; 23.1% were from 25 to 44; 26.4% were from 45 to 64; and 19.3% were 65 years of age or older. The gender makeup of the city was 48.4% male and 51.6% female.

=== 2000 census ===
As of the census of 2000, there were 3,501 people, 1,487 households, and 887 families living in the city. The population density was 921.7 inhabitants per square mile (355.9/km^{2}). There were 1,659 housing units at an average density of 436.8 per square mile (168.6/km^{2}). The racial makeup of the city was 94.03% White, 0.26% African American, 0.17% Native American, 4.03% Asian, 0.77% from other races, and 0.74% from two or more races. Hispanic or Latino of any race were 1.51% of the population.

There were 1,487 households, of which 27.2% had children under the age of 18 living with them, 49.0% were married couples living together, 7.9% had a female householder with no husband present, and 40.3% were non-families. 36.3% of all households were made up of individuals, and 16.5% had someone living alone who was 65 years of age or older. The average household size was 2.24 and the average family size was 2.93.

In the city, the population was spread out, with 23.3% under the age of 18, 9.5% from 18 to 24, 24.5% from 25 to 44, 20.5% from 45 to 64, and 22.2% who were 65 years of age or older. The median age was 40 years. For every 100 females, there were 94.2 males. For every 100 females age 18 and over, there were 89.8 males.

The median income for a household in the city was $33,452, and the median income for a family was $42,553. Males had a median income of $30,503 versus $21,676 for females. The per capita income for the city was $18,444. About 4.6% of families and 11.1% of the population were below the poverty line, including 17.4% of those under age 18 and 9.4% of those age 65 or over.

== Historic sites ==
- Ashley Park – Olson-Slaabakken cabin, Jackson County's oldest structure.
- Fort Belmont – 1873 farmhouse, blacksmith shop, log cabin and stockade, 1902 Delafield Lutheran Church.
- Jackson County Fair Village – 20 historical buildings and is located at the Jackson County Fairgrounds
- Jackson County Historical Society and Museum – west of Jackson at Lakefield, Minnesota, provides a look back at the county's history.
- Jackson County Courthouse – Constructed in 1908 with murals adorning the Court Room and Rotunda, listed on the National Register of Historic Places

== Economy ==
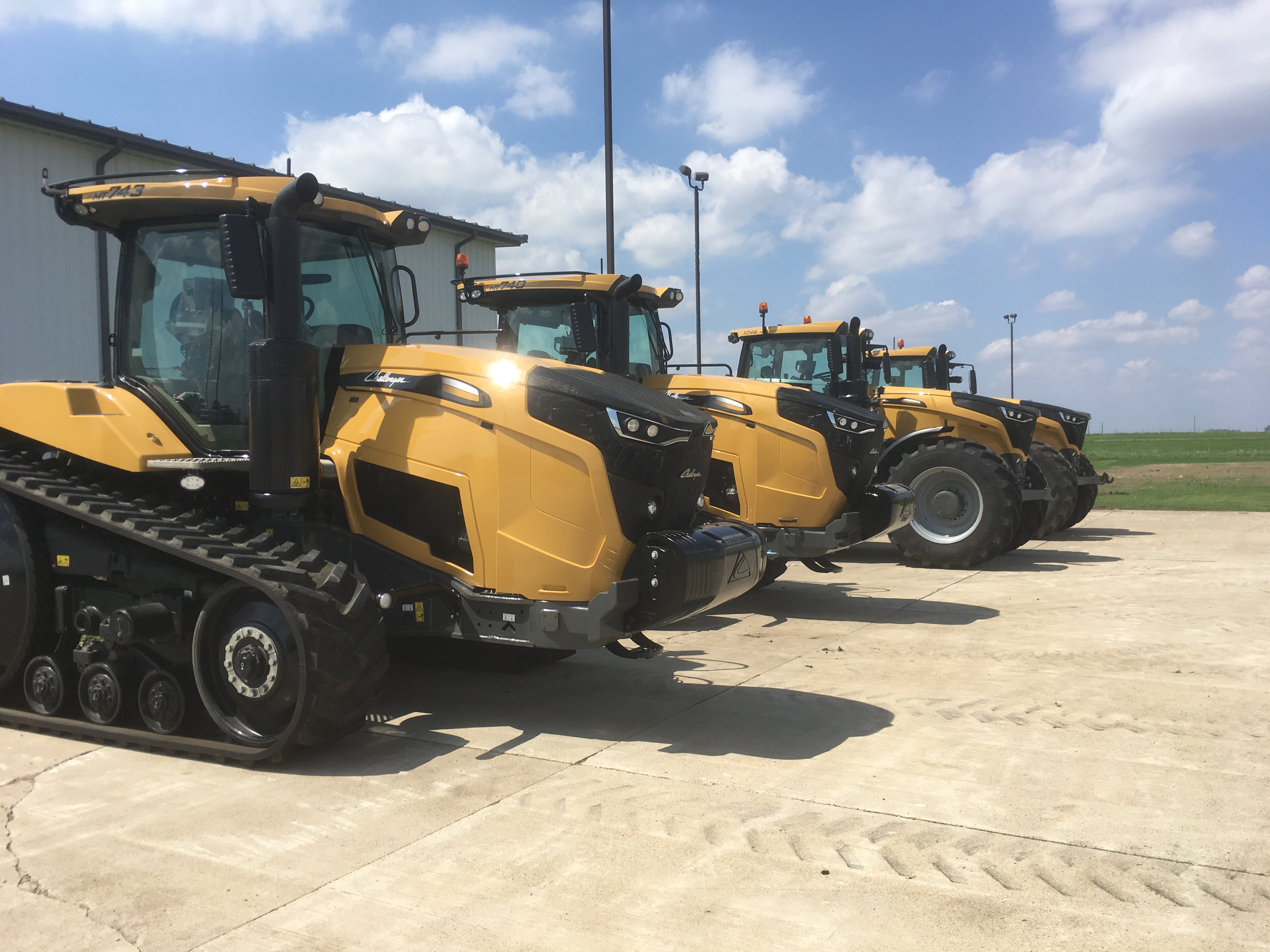
Challenger Tractors outside the AGCO plant in Jackson

Though largely a farming community, Jackson has a large industrial park with such businesses as AGCO, Last-Deck, USF Holland, New Fashion Pork, HitchDoc, and Pioneer. AGCO and Challenger Tractors are manufactured in Jackson.

== Government ==
Jackson is in Minnesota's 1st congressional district, represented by Republican Brad Finstad. At the state level, Jackson is in Senate District 22, represented by Republican Doug Magnus, and House District 22B, represented by Republican Brian Pfarr.

== Education ==
The Jackson County School Board operates the county's public schools.

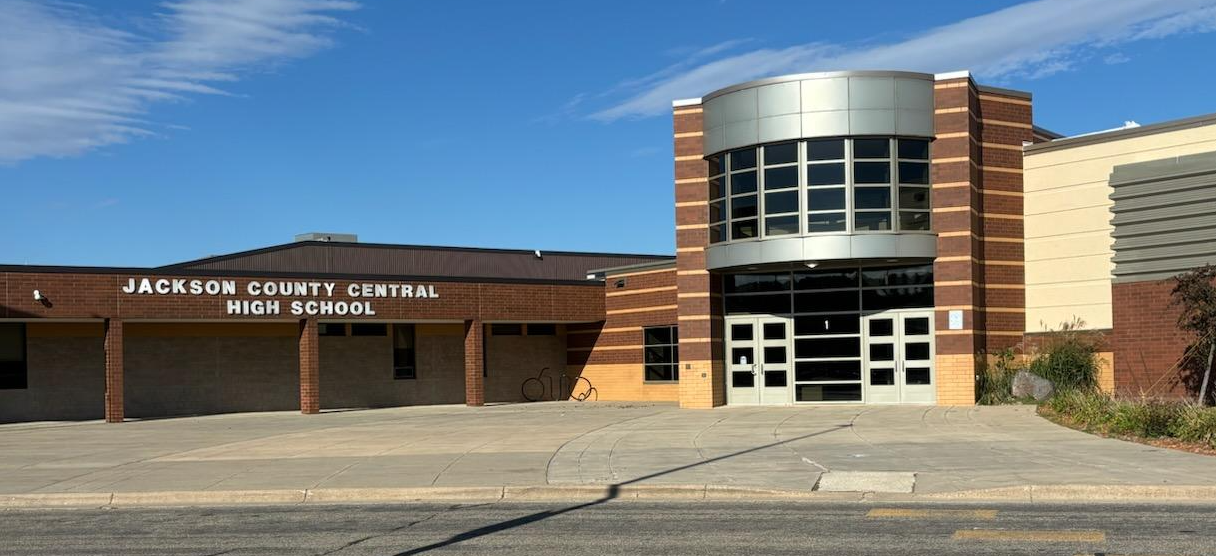
The Jackson County Central High School in Jackson, Minnesota

Jackson is home to Minnesota West Community and Technical College, which is affiliated with the Minnesota State Colleges and Universities system.

== Transportation ==
The city-owned Jackson Municipal Airport is 2.3 miles (3.7 km) north of Jackson's central business district.

== Media ==
=== Television ===
| Channel | Callsign | Affiliation | Branding | Subchannels | | Owner |
| (Virtual) | Callsign | Affiliation | Branding | Channel | Programming | Owner |
|---|---|---|---|---|---|---|
| 2.1 | K22MY-D (KTCA Translator) | PBS | TPT 2 | 2.2 | Minnesota Channel | Cooperative Television Association of Southern Minnesota |
| 2.1 | K22MY-D (KTCA Translator) | PBS | TPT 2 | 2.4 | PBS Kids | Cooperative Television Association of Southern Minnesota |
| 4.1 | K35IZ-D | CBS | WCCO 4 | 4.2 | Start TV | Cooperative Television Association of Southern Minnesota |
| 4.1 | K35IZ-D | CBS | WCCO 4 | 17.1 | Youtoo America | Cooperative Television Association of Southern Minnesota |
| 4.1 | K35IZ-D | CBS | WCCO 4 | 18.1 | Laff | Cooperative Television Association of Southern Minnesota |
| 5.1 | K17MY-D (KSTP Translator) | ABC | 5 Eyewitness News | 5.7 | Heroes & Icons | Cooperative Television Association of Southern Minnesota |
| 5.2 | K29LV-D (KSTC Translator) | Ind. | 45 TV | 5.3 | MeTV | Cooperative Television Association of Southern Minnesota |
| 5.2 | K29LV-D (KSTC Translator) | Ind. | 45 TV | 5.4 | Antenna TV | Cooperative Television Association of Southern Minnesota |
| 5.2 | K29LV-D (KSTC Translator) | Ind. | 45 TV | 5.6 | This TV | Cooperative Television Association of Southern Minnesota |
| 9.2 | K34NU-D (WFTC Translator) | Ind. | FOX 9 Plus | 9.3 | Movies! | Cooperative Television Association of Southern Minnesota |
| 9.2 | K34NU-D (WFTC Translator) | Ind. | FOX 9 Plus | 9.1 | FOX | Cooperative Television Association of Southern Minnesota |
| 11.4 | K19HZ-D (KARE Translator) | NBC | KARE 11 | 11.5 | Court TV | Cooperative Television Association of Southern Minnesota |
| 11.4 | K19HZ-D (KARE Translator) | NBC | KARE 11 | 11.6 | True Crime Network | Cooperative Television Association of Southern Minnesota |
| 11.4 | K19HZ-D (KARE Translator) | NBC | KARE 11 | 11.7 | Quest | Cooperative Television Association of Southern Minnesota |
| 16.1 | K23FO-D | Coop TV | | 16.2 | The Action Channel | Cooperative Television Association of Southern Minnesota |
| 16.1 | K23FO-D | Coop TV | | 16.3 | Heartland | Cooperative Television Association of Southern Minnesota |
| 16.1 | K23FO-D | Coop TV | | 16.4 | AMG TV | Cooperative Television Association of Southern Minnesota |
| 16.1 | K23FO-D | Coop TV | | 16.5 | Biz TV | Cooperative Television Association of Southern Minnesota |
| 16.1 | K23FO-D | Coop TV | | 23.5 | Grit | Cooperative Television Association of Southern Minnesota |
| 23.1 | K28OI-D (WUCW Translator) | CW | CW 23 | 23.2 | Comet | Cooperative Television Association of Southern Minnesota |
| 23.1 | K28OI-D (WUCW Translator) | CW | CW 23 | 23.3 | Charge! | Cooperative Television Association of Southern Minnesota |
| 23.1 | K28OI-D (WUCW Translator) | CW | CW 23 | 23.4 | TBD | Cooperative Television Association of Southern Minnesota |
| 41.1 | K30KQ-D (KPXM Translator) | ION | ION | 41.2 | Qubo | Cooperative Television Association of Southern Minnesota |
| 41.1 | K30KQ-D (KPXM Translator) | ION | ION | 41.3 | Ion Plus | Cooperative Television Association of Southern Minnesota |
| 41.1 | K30KQ-D (KPXM Translator) | ION | ION | 41.4 | ION Shop | Cooperative Television Association of Southern Minnesota |
| 41.1 | K30KQ-D (KPXM Translator) | ION | ION | 41.5 | QVC | Cooperative Television Association of Southern Minnesota |
| 41.1 | K30KQ-D (KPXM Translator) | ION | ION | 41.6 | HSN | Cooperative Television Association of Southern Minnesota |

== Notable people ==
- Gary Amdahl, author
- Jeffrey Bullock, president of the University of Dubuque
- Stephen Censky, U.S. Deputy Secretary of Agriculture from 2017 to 2020
- David Ellefson, former Megadeth bassist
- Willis H. Flygare, professor of chemistry at the University of Illinois
- Bjarne Elgar Grottum, Minnesota state senator, raised in Jackson
- Walter Halloran, assisted in Roland Doe's exorcism, which inspired William Peter Blatty's novel The Exorcist
- Milton C. Portmann, professional football player and decorated U.S. Army officer
