= KMSP Tower =

Broadcasting tower in Shoreview, Minnesota, United States

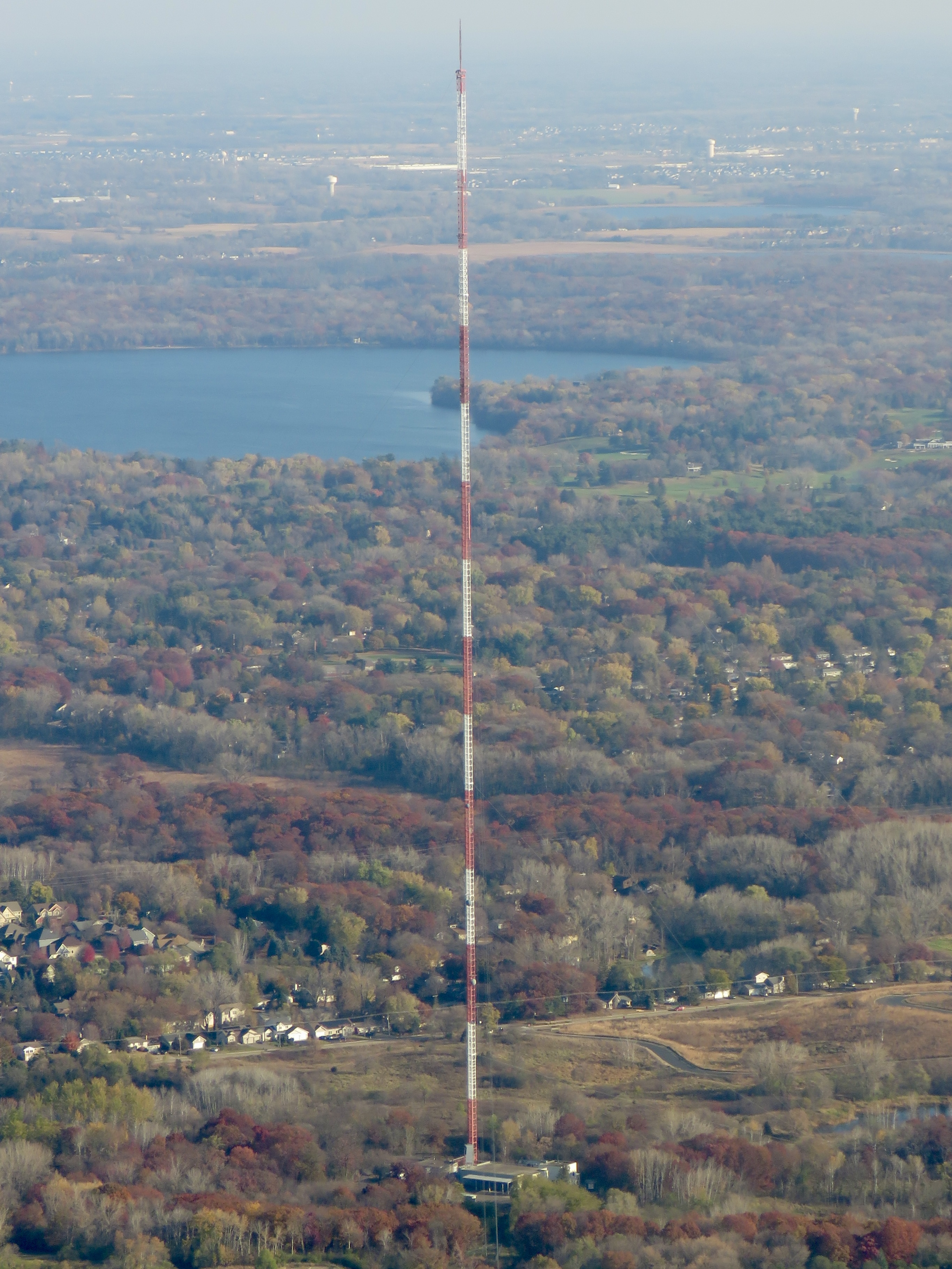
- The tower in 2024

- Location within Minnesota

General information
- Type: TV & Radio transmission tower
- Location: Shoreview, Ramsey County, Minnesota, U.S.
- Coordinates: 45°3′30″N 93°7′28″W
- Owner: Fox Television Stations, LLC

Height
- Height: 1,466 feet (447 m)

The KMSP Tower is a high aerial guyed mast used for the transmission of FM radio and over-the-air television in Shoreview, Minnesota. The structure was apparently the tallest in Minnesota until the construction of the KPXM Tower in 1997.

The tower, which was built in 1971, is owned by KMSP-TV ("Fox 9") parent Fox Television Stations but is shared by several area broadcasters; sister station WFTC ("Fox 9+") and the Twin Cities Public Television stations, KTCA and KTCI. Several FM stations are also on the tower: KQRS-FM 92.5 ("KQ92"), KXXR 93.7 ("93X"), KTCZ 97.1 ("Cities 97"), KTIS-FM 98.5, KSJN 99.5 ("MPR Classical"), KFXN-FM 100.3 ("KFAN"), KDWB 101.3, KEEY 102.1 ("K102"), KMNB 102.9 ("102.9 The Wolf"), and KZJK 104.1 ("Jack FM").

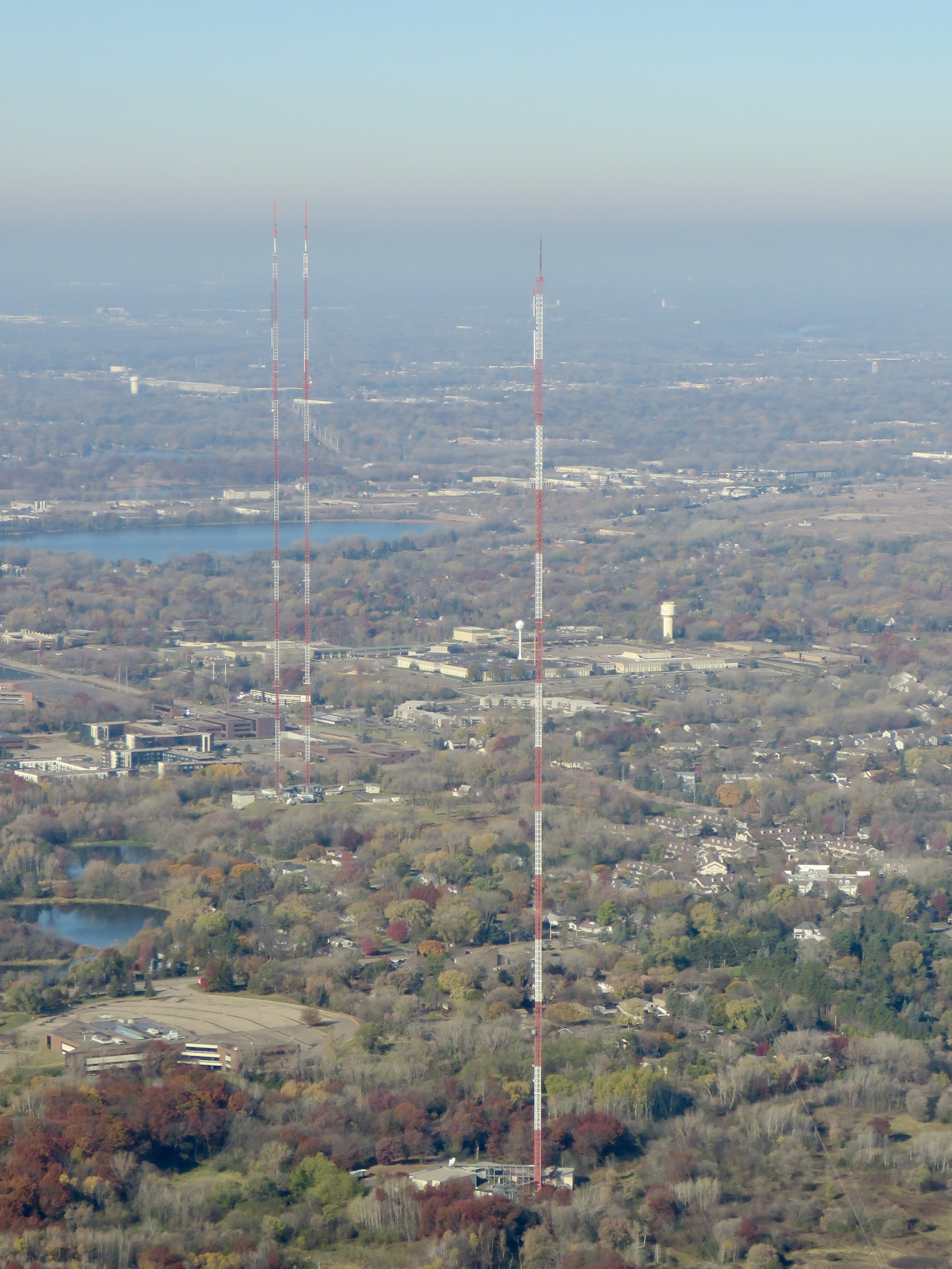
KMSP Tower with the Telefarm Towers in the background

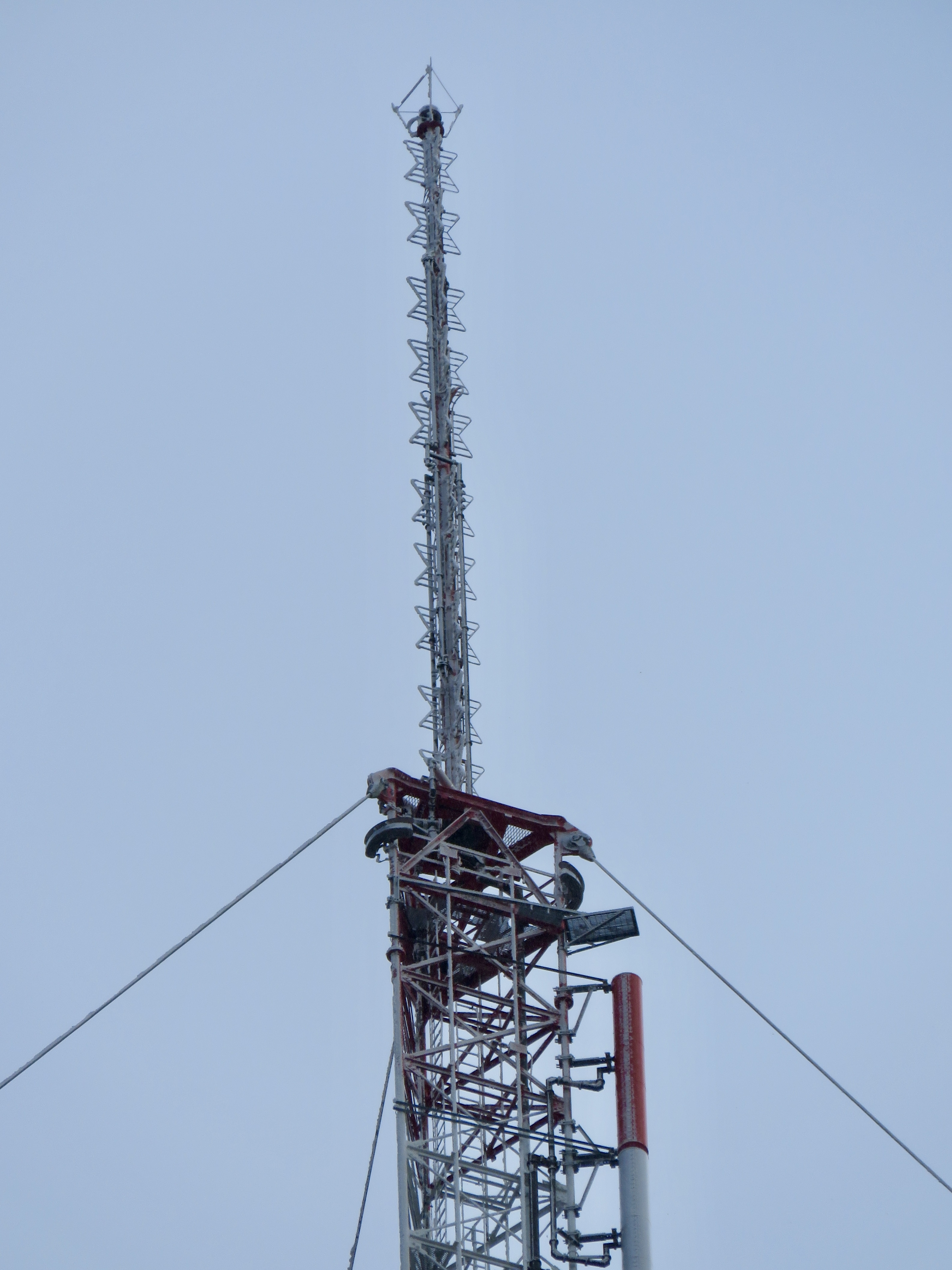
Antenna of the KMSP Tower

In 2001, a painter working on the tower died from asphyxia upon falling 500 feet down the structure.

In April 2022, the tower underwent upgrades to increase KMSP-TV's effective radiated power from 30 kW to 36.2 kW, improving signal strength and expanding coverage.

== FM ==
FM radio stations
| Frequency | Call sign | Name | Format | Owner |
|---|---|---|---|---|
| 92.5 | KQRS-FM | 92 KQRS | Classic Rock | Cumulus Media |
| 93.7 | KXXR | 93X | Active Rock | Cumulus Media |
| 97.1; 97.1 HD2; 97.1 HD3 | KTCZ | Cities 97; K-Love; Hot 102.5 | Hot AC; Contemporary Christian; Hip hop | iHeartMedia |
| 98.5; 98.5 HD2; 98.5 HD3; 98.5 HD4 | KTIS-FM | Life 98.5; Faith 900; Legacy HD3; The Mel | Contemporary Christian; Christian Talk; Classic CCM; Contemporary worship music | University of Northwestern - St. Paul |
| 99.5; 99.5 HD2 | KSJN | Classical MPR; Classical 24 | Classical; Classical | Minnesota Public Radio |
| 100.3; 100.3 HD2; 100.3 HD3 | KFXN-FM | The Fan; News/Talk 1130; K-Love | Sports; News/Talk; Contemporary Christian | iHeartMedia |
| 101.3; 101.3 HD2; 101.3 HD3 | KDWB-FM | 101.3 KDWB; Pride Radio; State Fair Radio | Top 40 (CHR); Dance/EDM; Variety Hits | iHeartMedia |
| 102.1; 102.1 HD3 | KEEY | K102; WIXK simulcast | Country; Hmong Music, Talk & News | iHeartMedia |
| 102.9; 102.9 HD2 | KMNB | 102.9 The Wolf; WCCO (AM) | Country; News/Talk | Audacy, Inc. |
| 104.1 | KZJK | Jack FM | Adult Hits | Audacy, Inc. |

== Television ==
| Channel | Callsign | Affiliation | Branding | Subchannels | | Owner |
| (Virtual) | Callsign | Affiliation | Branding | Channel | Programming | Owner |
|---|---|---|---|---|---|---|
| 34 (2.1) | KTCA | PBS | TPT 2 | 2.2; 2.3; 2.4; 2.5 | Minnesota Channel; TPT Life; PBS Kids; TPT Now | Twin Cities Public Television |
| 23 (2.1) | KTCI | PBS | TPT 2 (ATSC 3 simul.) | 2.2; 2.3; 2.4; 2.5 | Minnesota Channel; TPT Life; PBS Kids; TPT Now | Twin Cities Public Television |
| 29 (9.2) | WFTC | MyNetworkTV | Fox 9 Plus | 9.1; 9.2; 9.3; 23.2 | Fox; Fox 9+ Movies! Comet (WUCW) | Fox Television Stations |
| 9 (9.9) | KMSP | FOX | Fox 9 | 9.4; 9.5; 9.6; 9.8; 9.10 | Buzzr; QVC; Catchy Comedy; Story TV; Fox 9+ (WFTC) | Fox Television Stations |

== See also ==
- Telefarm Towers - Another major broadcasting site in Shoreview.
- List of masts
