= KMSP-TV =

Television station in Minneapolis

- Minneapolis–Saint Paul, Minnesota; United States
- City: Minneapolis, Minnesota
- Channels: Digital: 9 (VHF); Virtual: 9
- Branding: Fox 9

Programming
- Affiliations: 9.9: Fox; 9.10: Independent with MyNetworkTV; for others, see § KMSP-TV/WFTC subchannels

Ownership
- Owner: Fox Television Stations, LLC
- Sister stations: WFTC, KFTC

History
- First air date: January 9, 1955
- Former call signs: KEYD-TV (1955–1956); KMGM-TV (1956–1958)
- Former channel numbers: Analog: 9 (VHF, 1955–2009); Digital: 26 (UHF, 2000–2009)
- Former affiliations: DuMont (1955–1956); Independent (1956–1961, 1979–1986, 1988–1995); ABC (1961–1979); Fox (1986–1988); UPN (1995–2002)
- Call sign meaning: Minneapolis and Saint Paul

Technical information
- Licensing authority: FCC
- Facility ID: 68883
- ERP: 36.2 kW
- HAAT: 435 m (1,427 ft)
- Transmitter coordinates: 45°3′30″N 93°7′28″W
- Translator(s): see § Translators

Links
- Public license information: Public file; LMS
- Website: www.fox9.com

KMSP-TV (channel 9) is a television station licensed to Minneapolis, Minnesota, United States, serving the Twin Cities area. It is owned and operated by the Fox network through its Fox Television Stations division alongside WFTC (channel 9.2), an independent station with MyNetworkTV. The two stations share studios on Viking Drive in Eden Prairie; KMSP-TV's transmitter is located at the KMSP Tower in Shoreview, Minnesota.

KMSP-TV also serves the Mankato market (via K35KI-D in nearby St. James through the local municipal-operated Cooperative TV (CTV) network of translators), even though that area already has a Fox affiliate of its own. KMSP is also carried on the main channel of KFTC (channel 26), a satellite station of WFTC licensed to Bemidji which serves the northernmost reaches of the Minneapolis–St. Paul television market.

KMSP-TV is also carried in Canada on the Rogers Cable system in Thunder Bay, Ontario, on Tbaytel, and on Bell MTS Fibe TV in the province of Manitoba. Since October 2022, the station is also carried on Westman Communications, replacing Rochester, New York's WUHF.

== History ==
The Family Broadcasting Corporation in Minneapolis, owner of radio station KEYD (1440 AM, now KYCR), filed an application with the Federal Communications Commission (FCC) for a construction permit for a new commercial television station to be operated on Channel 9 on November 24, 1953. WLOL and WDGY (now KTLK) also expressed interest, but withdrew their applications in 1954, effectively handing the permit to Family Broadcasting. KEYD-TV began broadcasting on January 9, 1955, and was affiliated with the DuMont Television Network. During this time, Harry Reasoner, a graduate of Minneapolis West High School and the University of Minnesota, was hired as the station's first news anchor and news director. However, DuMont shut down in August 1956, leaving the station as an independent outlet; on June 3, 1956, the KEYD stations were sold to United Television, whose principals at the time included several stockholders of Pittsburgh station WENS, for $1.5 million. The new owners immediately sold off KEYD radio, refocused KEYD-TV's programming on films and sports, and shut down the news department; Reasoner was hired by CBS News a few months later. Reasoner became a host for CBS's 60 Minutes when it launched in 1968.

Channel 9 changed its call letters to KMGM-TV on May 23, 1956. At the time, the station was in negotiations with Metro-Goldwyn-Mayer to acquire the Twin Cities television rights to the company's films, along with selling a 25 percent stake in KMGM-TV to the studio. Negotiations broke down later that month over the cost of the films; additionally, Loew's, MGM's parent company at the time, filed a petition with the FCC against the call sign change, claiming that the use of KMGM was unauthorized and a violation of MGM's trademark. The FCC ruled against Loew's that October, saying that its call sign assignment policies were limited to preventing confusion between stations in a given area. The agreements to lease MGM's pre-1949 films and sell 25 percent of the station to Loew's were both completed that November; KMGM was the third station, after future sister station KTTV in Los Angeles and KTVR in Denver, to enter into such an arrangement.

National Telefilm Associates, which later purchased WNTA-TV in the New York City area, purchased the 75 percent of United Television not owned by MGM for $650,000 in November 1957, joining it to the NTA Film Network until it ended in 1961. After taking control, NTA expanded KMGM-TV's hours of operation as part of an overhaul of channel 9's schedule that also included the addition of newscasts. A few months later, on February 10, 1958, NTA bought MGM's stake for $130,000 and announced that it would change channel 9's calls to KMSP-TV; the call sign change took effect that March over the objections of KSTP-TV (channel 5). National Theatres, a theater chain whose broadcast holdings already included WDAF AM-TV in Kansas City, began the process of acquiring NTA in November 1958; in April 1959, it purchased 88 percent of the company. 20th Century-Fox, the former parent company of National Theatres, bought KMSP-TV for $4.1 million on November 9, 1959, retaining the United Television corporate name. The KMSP call letters were featured on prop television cameras in the May 29, 1963, episode of the CBS sitcom The Many Loves of Dobie Gillis, produced by 20th Century Fox Television; the show was loosely set in the Twin Cities area. The episode was titled "The Call of the, Like, Wild".

During its early years until 1972, the station's studios and offices were located in a lower level of the Foshay Tower in downtown Minneapolis; the transmitter was located on top of the building, the tallest structure in the area until 1971, along with WCCO-TV (channel 4) and WTCN-TV (channel 11, now KARE).

=== As an ABC affiliate ===
KMSP-TV took over the ABC affiliation from WTCN-TV on April 16, 1961. Throughout its years with ABC, KMSP was perennially the lowest-rated network affiliate in the Twin Cities, with only one-third of the viewing audience of each of their two competitors, CBS affiliate WCCO-TV and NBC affiliate KSTP-TV. It was also notorious for having a sub-standard news department with large staff turnover. In 1971, KMSP built a new tower in Shoreview, while the studios and offices relocated in 1972 to Edina on York Avenue South, across from Southdale Shopping Center.

In the late 1970s, ABC steadily rose to first place in the network ratings. Accordingly, the network sought to upgrade its slate of affiliates, which were made up of some stations that either had poor signals or poorly performing local programming. In December 1977, ABC warned United that it would yank its affiliation from channel 9 unless improvements were made and fast. In early 1978, to cash in on ABC's improved ratings, KMSP re-branded itself "ABC9" (approximately 20 years before the use of a network's name in a station's on-air branding became commonplace among U.S. affiliates), and retooled its newscast. Despite the changes, KMSP's news department remained in the ratings cellar.

=== Becoming an independent once again ===
1979 ad for Star Trek airings on KMSP, from after the station reverted to being an independent. The "9" logo was introduced in 1972, when it was an ABC affiliate, and continued to be in use until 2000.

On August 29, 1978, ABC announced that KSTP-TV would become the network's new Twin Cities affiliate the following spring. The signing of channel 5 made nationwide news, as it had been an NBC affiliate for three decades. KSTP-TV looked forward to affiliating with the top network, as third-place NBC had been in a long ratings slump. In retaliation for losing ABC, KMSP-TV immediately removed all ABC branding and regularly preempted network programming. Channel 9 then attempted to affiliate with NBC, thinking The Tonight Show would be a good lead-out from their 10 p.m. newscast, despite low prime time ratings. However, NBC, miffed at losing one of its strongest affiliates, and not wanting to pick up ABC's rejects, turned down KMSP's offer almost immediately and signed an affiliation agreement with independent station WTCN-TV. As a result of being rejected by both ABC and NBC, KMSP-TV prepared to become an independent station. Although it now faced a lack of weekend and weekday national sports coverage and having to buy seven to eight additional hours of programming per day, it also would not have to invest nearly as much into its news department and could invest its affiliate dues into syndicated film rights and local sports instead. Most of the on-air and off-air staffers resigned, not wanting to work for a down-scaled independent operation.

The affiliation switch occurred on March 5, 1979, and KMSP debuted its new independent schedule featuring cartoons, syndicated shows and even the locally based American Wrestling Association, with much of the station's programming having been acquired from WTCN-TV. To emphasize that the station's programming decisions would be influenced by viewers instead of a network, KMSP rebranded itself as "Receptive Channel 9", and an antenna was shown atop the station's logo in station identifications. The station became quite aggressive in acquiring programming, obtaining broadcast rights to several state high school sports championships from the MSHSL, the NHL's Minnesota North Stars and the Minnesota Twins baseball team.

As it turned out, KMSP's transition into an independent station turned out to be beneficial to the company. It was far more successful than the station ever had been as an ABC affiliate. It became a regional superstation, available on nearly every cable system in Minnesota as well as large portions of North Dakota, South Dakota, Iowa and Wisconsin. Over time, it became one of the most successful and profitable independent stations in the country.

KMSP went through another ownership change on June 9, 1981, when 20th Century-Fox spun off United Television as an independent company owned by Fox shareholders; the transaction was approved alongside the $700 million sale of 20th Century-Fox to Marvin Davis. Chris-Craft Industries, which in 1977 had acquired an interest in 20th Century-Fox that by 1981 comprised 22 percent of Fox's stock, received a 19 percent stake in United Television; later in June, it filed with the FCC for control of United, as it now owned 32 percent of its stock. Two years later, Chris-Craft, through its BHC subsidiary, increased its stake in United Television to 50.1 percent and gained majority control of the company.

=== First Fox affiliation, then back to independent ===
KMSP-TV remained an independent station through 1986 when it became one of the original charter affiliates of the newly launched Fox network on October 9. This suited channel 9, as it wanted the prestige of being a network affiliate without being tied to a network-dominated schedule. At the time, Fox only programmed a nightly talk show and, starting in 1987, two nights of prime time programming; the network would start its full-week programming schedule in 1993. Thus, like most early Fox affiliates, KMSP was still essentially an independent. For its first few years with Fox, the station served as the de facto Fox affiliate for nearly all of Minnesota and South Dakota.

However, the station did not remain a Fox affiliate for long. By 1988, KMSP was one of several Fox affiliates nationwide that were disappointed with the network's weak programming offerings, particularly on Saturday nights, which were bogging down KMSP's otherwise successful independent lineup. That January, channel 9 dropped Fox's Saturday night lineup; the move did not sit well with Fox, and in July 1988 the network announced that it would not renew its affiliations with KMSP and Chris-Craft sister station KPTV in Portland, Oregon. Fox then signed an agreement with KITN (channel 29, now WFTC) to become its new Twin Cities affiliate, and KMSP reverted to being an independent station full-time. In 1992, the station relocated to its current studio facilities on Viking Drive in Eden Prairie. Along with the other United Television stations, KMSP carried programming from the Prime Time Entertainment Network from 1993 to 1995.

=== As a UPN affiliate ===
By the early 1990s, Fox had exploded in popularity; it had begun carrying strong shows that were starting to rival the program offerings of the "Big Three" networks and had just picked up the broadcast rights to the NFL's National Football Conference. In response to this, in October 1993, Chris-Craft/United Television partnered with Paramount Pictures (which was acquired by Viacom in 1994) to form the United Paramount Network (UPN) and both companies made independent stations that both companies respectively owned in several large and mid-sized U.S. cities charter stations of the new network.

UPN launched on January 16, 1995, (with the two-hour premiere of Star Trek: Voyager), with channel 9 becoming a UPN owned-and-operated station due to Chris-Craft/United's ownership stake in the network (later part-ownership in 1996 when Viacom bought a 50% stake of the network)—making it the second network-owned station in the Twin Cities (alongside CBS-owned WCCO-TV). Over time, KMSP became one of UPN's most successful affiliates in terms of viewership. In addition to UPN's prime-time schedule and the network's daytime children's blocks (such as UPN Kids from 1995 to 1999, and Disney's One Too from 1999 to 2003), the station was still enjoying success with local sports programming featuring the Minnesota Twins, as well as the MSHSL championships. KMSP was stripped of its status as a UPN owned-and-operated station in 2000 after Viacom exercised a contractual clause to buy out Chris-Craft's stake in the network, although the station remained with UPN as an affiliate for another two years. Around this time, Viacom bought CBS (and in turn, WCCO).

=== Return to Fox as an owned-and-operated station ===
News Corporation, through its Fox Television Stations subsidiary, agreed to purchase Chris-Craft Industries and its stations, including KMSP-TV, for $5.35 billion in August 2000 (this brought KMSP, along with San Antonio's KMOL-TV and Salt Lake City's KTVX, back under common ownership with 20th Century Fox); the deal followed a bidding war with Viacom. The sale was completed on July 31, 2001. While Fox pledged to retain the Chris-Craft stations' UPN affiliations through at least the 2000–01 season, and Chris-Craft agreed to an 18-month renewal for its UPN affiliates in January 2001, an affiliation swap was expected once KMSP's affiliation agreement with UPN ran out in 2002, given Fox's presumed preference to have its programming on a station that it already owned. Additionally, KMSP's signal was much stronger than that of WFTC; it was a VHF station that had been on the air much longer than UHF outlet WFTC. Most importantly, Fox had been aggressively expanding local news programming on its stations, and KMSP had an established and competitive news department whereas WFTC's news department did not begin operations until April 2001. The move was made easier when, in July 2001, Fox agreed to trade KTVX and KMOL (now WOAI-TV) to Clear Channel Communications in exchange for WFTC, a transaction completed that October.

The affiliation switch, officially announced in May 2002, occurred on September 8, 2002 (accompanied by a "Make the Switch" ad campaign that was seen on both stations), as Fox programming returned to KMSP-TV after a 14-year absence, while WFTC took the UPN affiliation; KMSP was the only former Chris-Craft station that was acquired and kept by Fox that did not retain its UPN affiliation. The station began carrying Fox's entire programming schedule at that time, including the FoxBox children's block (which later returned to WFTC as 4KidsTV, until the block was discontinued by Fox in December 2008 due to a dispute with 4Kids Entertainment). The affiliation swap coincided with the start of the 2002 NFL season; KMSP effectively became the "home" station for the NFL's Minnesota Vikings as a result of Fox holding the broadcast rights to the National Football Conference (from 1994 to 2001, most Vikings games were aired on WFTC). Finally, in 2014, with the launch of Xploration Station which replaced Weekend Marketplace which WFTC carried, KMSP-TV began clearing the entire Fox network schedule for good.

Since Fox has affiliates in most media markets and the FCC's syndication exclusivity regulations normally require cable systems to only carry a given network's local affiliate, and Fox prefers only an area's affiliate be carried as opposed to a distant station for rating tabulation purposes, KMSP was eventually removed from most cable providers outside the Twin Cities. By this time, these areas had enough stations to provide local Fox affiliates. KMSP thus effectively lost the "regional superstation" status it had held for almost a quarter-century, dating back to when it was an independent station. Due to the advent of digital television, many stations in smaller markets previously served by KMSP began operating UPN-affiliated digital subchannels towards the end of the network's run to replace that network's programming in those markets, which in turn became MyNetworkTV or CW affiliates.

On December 14, 2017, The Walt Disney Company, owner of KSTP-TV's affiliated network ABC, announced its intent to buy KMSP-TV's parent company, 21st Century Fox, for $66.1 billion; the sale, which closed on March 20, 2019, excluded KMSP-TV and sister station WFTC as well as the Fox network, the MyNetworkTV programming service, Fox News, Fox Sports 1, the Big Ten Network and the Fox Television Stations unit, which were all transferred to the newly formed Fox Corporation. Fox Sports North would be divested in a separate deal to Diamond Sports Group, made up of a joint venture of WUCW owner Sinclair Broadcast Group and Entertainment Studios.

In April 2025, KMSP-TV announced a deal with the Minnesota Twins to simulcast ten of the team's games produced by MLB Local Media under the Twins.tv banner on the station, in addition to Twins games broadcast via Fox's national MLB package.

== News operation ==
KMSP presently broadcasts 59 1/2 hours of locally produced newscasts each week (with 10 hours each weekday, four hours on Saturdays, and 5 1/2 hours on Sundays); in regards to the number of hours devoted to news programming, it is the highest newscast output among Minneapolis' broadcast television stations.

The station's first news director and news anchor was Harry Reasoner when KMSP signed on (as KEYD-TV) in 1955. Despite the station's focus on live coverage of news and sports, as well as awards from the University of Minnesota Journalism School and the Northwest Radio–TV News Association, KEYD's newscasts were generally in fourth place in the ratings. After channel 9's ownership changed in 1956, the news operation was closed down. News programming returned to the station after NTA bought KMGM-TV in 1957.

The station, which had long been a distant third to WCCO-TV and KSTP-TV in the Twin Cities news ratings, began an aggressive campaign in 1973 to gain ground against its competition. After a nationwide search, management hired Ben Boyett and Phil Bremen to anchor a newscast with a new set and format, known as newsnine. The new format did not really draw many new viewers, and the station's low news budget, ill-conceived promotion, and frequent technical glitches, along with its network's news division's overall struggles and wire service before Roone Arledge took control, didn't help matters. One botched campaign for a news series on venereal disease, in the spring of 1974, resulted in lawsuits from two young women that claimed that their likenesses were used in promos without their permission, thus damaging their reputations. By the fall of 1975, Boyett and Bremen would be gone, replaced by respected veteran newsman Don Harrison and the station's first female anchor, Cathie Mann. These changes did little to take channel 9 out of third place, and despite ABC becoming the #1 network by 1977 and Arledge's moves to increase ABC News's prestige, KMSP's newscasts still struggled.

After KMSP lost the ABC affiliation in 1979, the station's news operation reduced to a more scaled-down 9 p.m. or post-sports-only newscast which was more manageable for KMSP to maintain at the time. It was paired with the syndicated Independent Network News in the early-to-mid-1980s. The newscast's budget and ratings would increase by the end of that decade, with re-expansions of the news department into the morning and early evenings occurring in the mid-1990s.

By the end of the decade, Minnesota 9 News was competitive with the other stations in the market, especially with its all-local morning newscast doing well against the network morning shows. This was despite KMSP being hamstrung by its UPN affiliation, which had seen several affiliates of the network cut or close their news departments through its decade of existence, due to the network's overall and prime time ratings failing to meet expectations. Outside of UPN's Star Trek series, the rest of the network's programming schedule struggled outside of cities, a particular issue that affected KMSP as a statewide superstation with a wide rural footprint. This played into the station's decision to eschew their owner-mandated "UPN 9" branding for the more neutral statewide branding of "Minnesota 9" (later, 9 News) to promote their news department.

When KMSP rejoined Fox in 2002, the station's prime time newscast, now with the stronger aid of Fox's prime time lineup and sports coverage, frequently outrated the newscasts on KSTP-TV. Following Fox's acquisition of WFTC in 2001, that station's existing news operation was moved into an auxiliary studio of KMSP as part of a slow merger (including limited story-sharing); after Fox canceled channel 29's newscast in 2006, some of WFTC's staff moved in full to KMSP.

On May 11, 2009, KMSP became the second station in the Twin Cities (behind KARE-TV) to broadcast local newscasts in high-definition.

=== Controversy ===
On June 16, 2006, during one of the station's newscasts, KMSP broadcast a "video news release" about convertibles produced by General Motors without required attribution that it was distributed by the auto giant. The narrator, MediaLink publicist Andrew Schmertz, was introduced as reporter André Schmertz. On March 24, 2011, the FCC levied a $4,000 fine against KMSP for airing the video news release without disclosing the corporate source of the segment to its viewers, following complaints filed by the Free Press and the Center for Media and Democracy in 2006 and 2007.

=== On-air staff ===
==== Notable current on-air staff ====
- Randy Meier – anchor
- Dawn Mitchell – anchor/reporter

==== Notable former on-air staff ====
- Heidi Collins — news anchor (2010–2013)
- Rod Grams — news anchor (1982–1991)
- Don Harrison — news anchor (1975–1979)
- Jack Horner — sports anchor (1950s)
- Bob Kurtz — sports anchor
- George Noory — news director (late 1970s)
- Hank Plante — news reporter (1979–1980)
- Ahmad Rashad — sports anchor (1978)
- Harry Reasoner — KMSP's first news director/anchor (1950s)
- Robyne Robinson — news anchor (1990–2010)

== Technical information ==
=== KMSP-TV/WFTC subchannels ===
KMSP-TV and WFTC broadcast from the KMSP Tower in Shoreview, Minnesota. The signal of KMSP-TV contains six subchannels, while WFTC's signal contains four. All subchannels on both transmitters share the same major virtual channel of 9.

Subchannels of KMSP-TV and WFTC
Channel	Station	Res.	Short name	Programming
9.1	WFTC	720p	FOX-9	Fox (KMSP-TV simulcast)
9.2	WFTC	720p	FOX9 +	Main WFTC programming
9.3	WFTC	480i	Movies!	Movies!
9.4	KMSP-TV	480i	BUZZR	Buzzr
9.5	KMSP-TV	480i	QVC	QVC
9.6	KMSP-TV	480i	CATCHY	Catchy Comedy
9.7	WFTC	720p	FoxWX	Fox Weather
9.8	KMSP-TV	720p	Stories	Story Television
9.9	KMSP-TV	720p	Fox 9	Fox
9.10	KMSP-TV	720p	FOX 9+	Simulcast of WFTC

The WFTC transmitter also broadcasts two subchannels of WUCW (23.2 Comet and 23.6 Antenna TV), the market's ATSC 3.0 (NextGen TV) host station.

In November 2009, KMSP was added to a subchannel of WFTC and vice versa, to aid viewers that had difficulty receiving KMSP's signal on the VHF band. Beginning June 24, 2014, subchannels of WFTC began using major channel 9, with 29.1 changed to 9.2, and KMSP-TV began broadcasting in high definition from the WFTC transmitter on channel 9.1.

=== KFTC subchannels ===
KFTC is broadcast from a transmitter northeast of Bemidji.

Subchannels of KFTC
Subchannel	Res.	Short name	Programming
26.1	720p	Fox	Fox (KMSP-TV)
26.2	720p	Fox9Plu	Main WFTC programming
26.3	480i	Movies!	Movies!
26.4	720p	FoxWX	Fox Weather

KFTC also broadcasts 23.2 Comet and 23.6 Antenna TV from WUCW.

KFTC began providing high-definition service for the main KMSP and WFTC subchannels in October 2014. Translators of KMSP in Brainerd and Walker were switched to KFTC, making WFTC available over-the-air in those communities for the first time.

=== Analog-to-digital conversion ===
KMSP-TV began broadcasting a digital signal on UHF channel 21 on June 19, 2000. The station shut down its analog signal, over VHF channel 9, on June 12, 2009, the digital television transition date, and shifted its digital signal to channel 9.

=== Broadcasting facilities ===
The KMSP Tower is located in Shoreview. Fox Television Stations owns the mast standing 1,466 feet (447 m) tall, and along with KMSP and WFTC, other occupants of the tower include Twin Cities PBS's KTCA/KTCI, and ten FM stations broadcasting across the Twin Cities.

=== Translators ===
In addition to the main transmitter in Shoreview and KFTC in Bemidji, the signals of KMSP-TV and WFTC signal are relayed to outlying parts of Minnesota through a network of translators. The main channels of each station are available from all translators.

The following translators rebroadcast WFTC:

- Alexandria: K32EB-D
- Frost: K29IF-D
- Jackson: K34NU-D
- Olivia: K34OZ-D
- Redwood Falls: K19CV-D
- St. James: K23MF-D
- Walker: K21HX-D
- Willmar: K36OL-D

The following translators rebroadcast KMSP-TV:

- Alexandria: K30AF-D
- Frost: K19LJ-D
- Jackson: K31NT-D
- St. James: K16CG-D
- Willmar: K30FZ-D

The following translators rebroadcast KFTC:

- Brainerd: K20NH-D
- Red Lake: K34NP-D
- Walker: K21HX-D (26.1 through 26.3 as 21.1 through 21.3)
