= Weiser Airpark =

Airfield in Harris County, Texas, United States

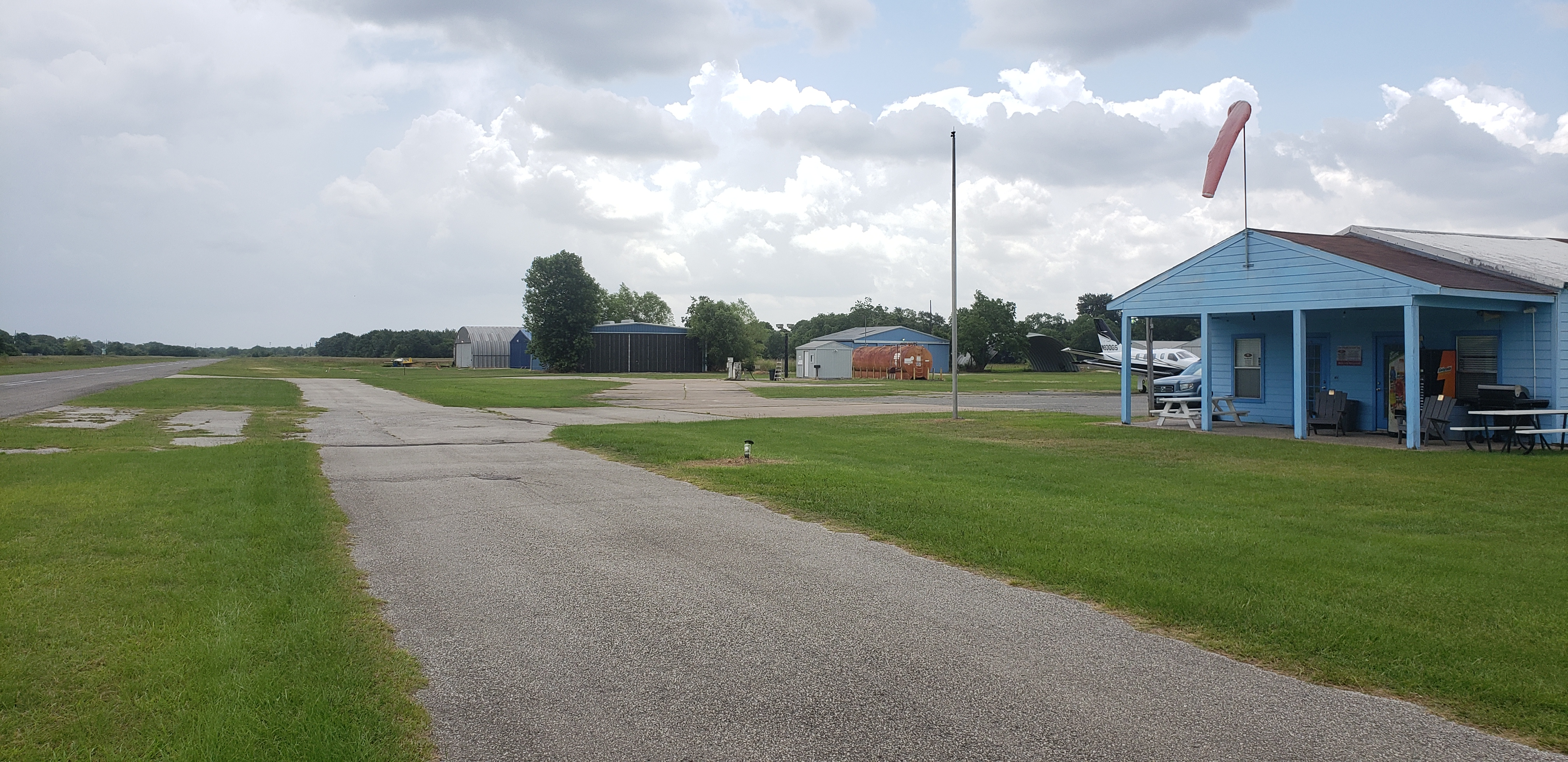
- View of the airport in June 2019
- IATA: none; ICAO: KEYQ; FAA LID: EYQ

Summary
- Airport type: Public
- Owner: Cecil and Robert Weiser
- Serves: Houston, Texas
- Location: Harris County, Texas
- Closed: November 3, 2019
- Elevation AMSL: 137 ft / 42 m
- Coordinates: 29°56′07″N 095°38′23″W
- Website: www.WeiserAirpark.com
- Interactive map of Weiser Airpark

Runways
Direction	Length		Surface
Direction	ft	m	Surface
9/27	3,455	1,053	Asphalt
16/34	2,000	610	Turf

Statistics (2006)
- Aircraft operations: 38,020
- Based aircraft: 75
- Source: FAA and airport website

Weiser Airpark (ICAO: KEYQ, FAA LID: EYQ) (spelled Weiser Air Park in some sources) was a privately owned, public-use airport located on the Northwest Freeway (U.S. Highway 290) in Cypress, an unincorporated area of Harris County, Texas, United States. The airport was 11 nautical miles (20 km; 13 mi) northwest of the central business district of Houston. The airport closed permanently in 2019.

Although most U.S. airports use the same three-letter location identifier for the FAA and IATA, Weiser Airpark was assigned EYQ by the FAA but had no designation from the IATA.

== Facilities and aircraft ==
Weiser Airpark covered an area of 102 acres (41 ha) at an elevation of 137 ft (42 m) above mean sea level. It had two runways: 9/27 was 3,455 ft × 40 ft (1,053 m × 12 m) with asphalt pavement, and 16/34 was 2,000 ft × 33 ft (610 m × 10 m) with a turf surface.

For the 12-month period ending March 3, 2006, the airport had 38,020 aircraft operations, an average of 104 per day: 99.9% general aviation and 0.1% air taxi. At that time there were 75 aircraft based at this airport: 93% single-engine and 7% multi-engine.

== History ==
The original grass airstrip opened between 1945 and 1947 as the F.H. Jackson Airport, and was purchased by brothers Robert and Cecil Weiser in 1951. In 1963, the brothers built ten hangars on the property and renamed it Weiser Airpark. In 1964, they added another twenty hangars and fenced the site to keep wandering cattle out. The runway was paved around 1980.

Robert Weiser died in 2013. After Cecil died in November 2017, the Weiser family lost interest in operating the airfield. At the time, it was home to about 78 aircraft, a flight school, an aircraft repair shop, a flying club, and the "shack", a public lounge and outdoor aircraft viewing area that was a popular local gathering place. Area pilots and airfield tenants launched an effort to purchase the field from the family and keep it open. However, it was a prime location for commercial or industrial development due to frontage on busy U.S. Highway 290, and the family listed it for sale for US$24 million. The family announced in mid 2019 that the 102-acre (41 ha) site was being sold for redevelopment. In September 2019, the Trammell Crow Company announced that it had purchased the field in partnership with Clarion Partners, that it would be redeveloped as an industrial park, and that the Weiser family had been granted a temporary lease until December 2019 to wind down airfield operations. Detailed terms of the purchase were not publicly disclosed.
