= Jackson Municipal Airport (Alabama) =

Airport in Alabama, United States

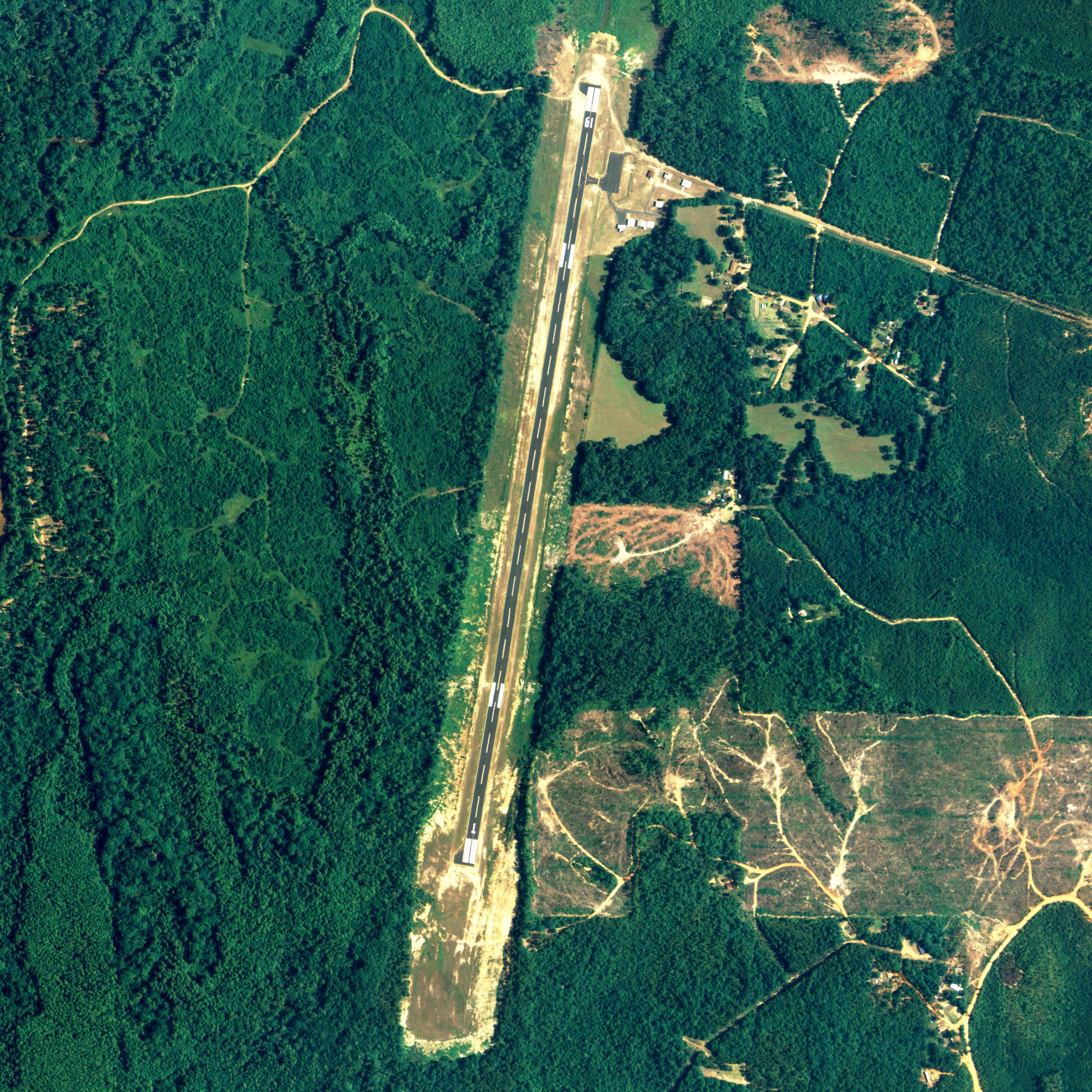
- NAIP aerial image, 30 June 2006
- IATA: none; ICAO: none; FAA LID: 4R3

Summary
- Airport type: Public
- Owner: City of Jackson
- Serves: Jackson, Alabama
- Elevation AMSL: 62 ft (19 m)
- Coordinates: 31°28′14″N 087°53′45″W

Map
- Location of airport in Alabama 4R3 (the United States)

Runways
Direction	Length		Surface
Direction	ft	m	Surface
1/19	5,003	1,525	Asphalt

Statistics (2010)
- Aircraft operations: 2,800
- Source: Federal Aviation Administration

Jackson Municipal Airport (FAA LID: 4R3) is a city-owned public airport two miles south of Jackson, in Clarke County, Alabama.

This airport is in the FAA's National Plan of Integrated Airport Systems for 2011–2015 and 2009–2013, both of which called it a general aviation facility.

== Facilities and aircraft ==
Jackson Municipal Airport covers 112 acres (45 ha) at an elevation of 62 feet (19 m) above mean sea level. It has one runway, 1/19, 5,003 by 80 feet (1,525 x 24 m) asphalt. In the year ending July 15, 2010 the airport had 2,800 general aviation aircraft operations, an average of 233 per month.

== See also ==
- List of airports in Alabama
