= Jackson Municipal Airport (Minnesota) =

Airport in Minnesota, United States

- IATA: MJQ; ICAO: KMJQ; FAA LID: MJQ

Summary
- Airport type: Public
- Owner: City of Jackson
- Serves: Jackson, Minnesota
- Elevation AMSL: 1,446 ft (441 m)
- Coordinates: 43°39′00″N 094°59′12″W
- Website: http://www.cityofjacksonmn.com/index.asp?Type=B_BASIC&SEC={B8CAA73E-1960-46FB-AACD-91E594574614

Map
- Location of airport in Minnesota/United States MJQ (the United States)

Runways
Direction	Length		Surface
Direction	ft	m	Surface
13/31	3,591	1,095	Asphalt
4/22	2,250	686	Turf

Statistics (2010)
- Aircraft operations: 19,000
- Based aircraft: 17
- Source: Federal Aviation Administration

Jackson Municipal Airport (IATA: MJQ, ICAO: KMJQ, FAA LID: MJQ) is a city-owned public-use airport located two nautical miles (2.3 mi; 3.7 km) north of the central business district of Jackson, a city in Jackson County, Minnesota, United States. It is included in the FAA's National Plan of Integrated Airport Systems for 2011–2015, which categorized it as a general aviation facility.

== Facilities and aircraft ==
Jackson Municipal Airport covers an area of 270 acres (110 ha) at an elevation of 1,446 feet (441 m) above mean sea level. It has two runways: 13/31 is 3,591 by 75 feet (1,095 by 23 m) with an asphalt surface; 4/22 is 2,250 by 300 feet (686 by 91 m) with a turf surface.

For the 12-month period ending June 30, 2010, the airport had 19,000 aircraft operations, an average of 52 per day: 99% general aviation, 1% air taxi, and <1% military. At that time there were 17 single-engine aircraft based at this airport.

== See also ==
- List of airports in Minnesota
