= Mother of the Bride (1993 film) =

1993 American television film

- Genre: Drama
- Written by: Bart Baker
- Directed by: Charles Correll Jr.
- Starring: Rue McClanahan; Kristy McNichol
- Music by: Jay Gruska
- Country of origin: United States
- Original language: English

Production
- Executive producer: Ronald H. Gilbert
- Producers: Joel Fields; Bart Baker; Leonard Hill; Cyrus Yavneh
- Cinematography: Ronald M. Lautore
- Editors: Janet Ashikaga; Craig Holt
- Running time: 105 minutes
- Production company: Leonard Hill Films

Original release
- Network: CBS
- Release: February 27, 1993

Related
- Children of the Bride; Baby of the Bride

Mother of the Bride is an American made-for-television drama film released in 1993. It starred and was produced by Kristy McNichol and directed by Charles Correll Jr.. It premiered on February 27, 1993 on CBS, and was released on DVD in 2006.

The film is the third installment in a trilogy that began with Children of the Bride (1990) and continued with Baby of the Bride (1991).

== Plot ==
Margaret Becker-Hix (Rue McClanahan) deals with her daughter Anne’s upcoming wedding, Mary’s relationship with a motorcycle enthusiast and her ex-husband, Richard, coming back into the picture to make amends and perhaps, romance her.

Anne deals with her cold feet about getting married and he fiancé is doing all he can to reassure her that it is worth it.

Mary is a single mom, raising her child who is very close in age to her young half-brother. She begins to become attracted to a single dad who is raising a classmate of her daughter.

While this is all happening, the family is rallying together for Anne’s wedding.

== Cast ==
- Rue McClanahan as Margret Becker-Hix
- Kristy McNichol as Mary
- Brett Cullen as Dennis Becker
- Anne Bobby as Anne
- Conor O'Farrell as Andrew Becker
- Ted Shackelford as John Hix
- Greg Kean as Nick
- Paul Dooley as Richard Becker
- Beverley Mitchell as Jersey
- Casey Wallace as Amy
- Nan Martin as Beatrice
- Jeff Yagher as Ken
- Catherine Bell as Chastity
- Joel McKinnon Miller as Photographer
