= Baby of the Bride =

1991 American television film

- Genre: Drama
- Written by: Bart Baker
- Directed by: Bill Bixby
- Starring: Rue McClanahan; Kristy McNichol
- Music by: Jay Gruska
- Country of origin: United States
- Original language: English

Production
- Executive producers: Ronald H. Gilbert; Leonard Hill
- Producers: Joel Fields; Bart Baker
- Cinematography: Ronald M. Lautore
- Editor: Mark W. Rosenbaum
- Running time: 105 minutes
- Production company: Leonard Hill Films

Original release
- Network: CBS
- Release: December 22, 1991

Related
- Children of the Bride; Mother of the Bride

Baby of the Bride is a 1991 American drama television film directed by Bill Bixby. It was filmed in July 1991 and It premiered on CBS on December 22, 1991, and was released on DVD in 2003.

Soon after returning from their honeymoon, John and Margret Hix receive the surprise of their life - at 53, Margret is pregnant. Against her husband's wishes, Margret decides to keep the baby... but she isn't the only one in the family who is expecting. Margret's daughter, Mary, who has just left the convent, is due just a few months before her mother. It was preceded by Children of the Bride.

== Cast ==
- Rue McClanahan as Margret Becker-Hix
- Kristy McNichol as Mary
- John Wesley Shipp as Dennis Becker
- Anne Bobby as Anne
- Conor O'Farrell as Andrew Becker
- Ted Shackelford as John Hix
- Beverley Mitchell as Jersey Becker
- Casey Wallace as Amy Becker
- Sam T. Jensen as Baby Sam Hix
