= Children of the Bride =

1990 American television film

- Genre: Drama
- Written by: Bart Baker
- Directed by: Jonathan Sanger
- Starring: Rue McClanahan; Kristy McNichol; Jack Coleman; Anne Bobby; Conor O'Farrell; Patrick Duffy
- Music by: Yanni
- Country of origin: United States
- Original language: English

Production
- Executive producers: Ron Gilbert; Leonard Hill
- Producers: Joel Fields; Bart Baker
- Cinematography: Ronald M. Lautore
- Editor: Mark W. Rosenbaum
- Running time: 105 minutes
- Production company: Leonard Hill Films

Original release
- Network: CBS
- Release: October 5, 1990

Related
- Baby of the Bride Mother of the Bride

Children of the Bride is a 1990 American made-for-television drama film directed by Jonathan Sanger. The film stars Rue McClanahan, Kristy McNichol, Jack Coleman, Anne Bobby, Conor O'Farrell, and Patrick Duffy. It premiered on CBS on October 5, 1990, and was released on DVD in 2003.

The film was followed by two sequels: Baby of the Bride (1991) and Mother of the Bride (1993).

== Plot ==
Margret Becker has a big surprise for her adult children. She is getting remarried—and her new fiancé, John, is young enough to be her son. The Becker children want to help their mother celebrate her newfound love, but find themselves wildly uncomfortable with their future stepfather. As her wedding day approaches, Margret learns that her first chance at a second start may be her children's last straw.

== Cast ==
- Rue McClanahan as Margret Becker
- Kristy McNichol as Mary
- Jack Coleman as Dennis Becker
- Anne Bobby as Anne
- Conor O'Farrell as Andrew Becker
- Patrick Duffy as John Hix
- Beverley Mitchell as Jersey Becker
- Casey Wallace as Amy Becker
