= Captains Courageous (1977 film) =

1977 American television film

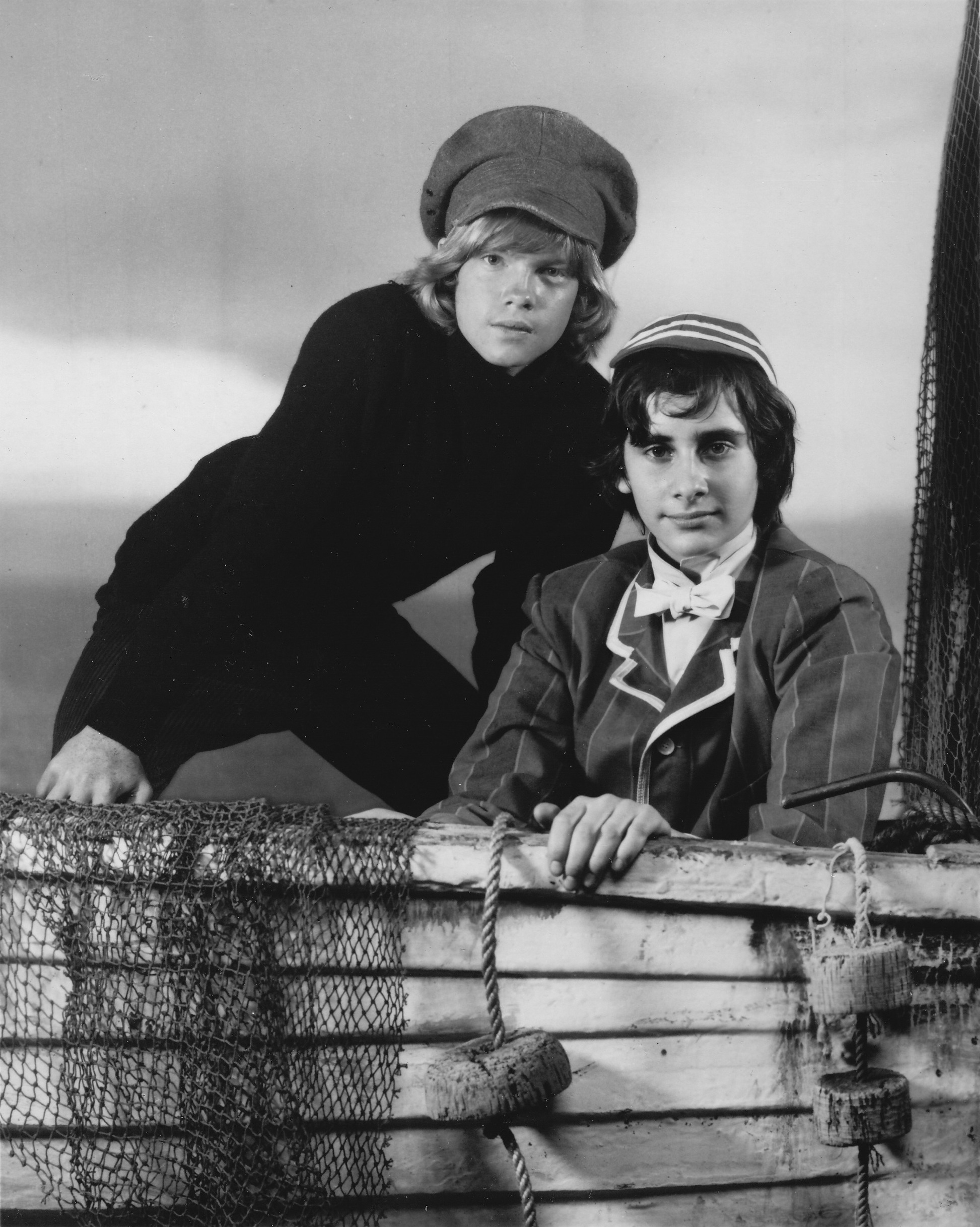
- Promotional photo for the film
- Genre: Adventure
- Based on: Captains Courageous by Rudyard Kipling
- Written by: John Gay
- Directed by: Harvey Hart
- Starring: Karl Malden; Jonathan Kahn; Johnny Doran; Neville Brand; Fred Gwynne; Charles Dierkop; Fritz Weaver; Ricardo Montalbán
- Composer: Allyn Ferguson
- Country of origin: United States
- Original language: English

Production
- Producer: Norman Rosemont
- Production locations: Camden, Maine; Rockland, Maine
- Cinematography: Philip H. Lathrop
- Editor: John McSweeney Jr.
- Running time: 100 minutes
- Production company: Norman Rosemont Productions

Original release
- Network: ABC
- Release: December 4, 1977

Captains Courageous is a 1977 American television film based on the novel Captains Courageous by Rudyard Kipling. It was produced by Norman Rosemont, who made a number of television films based on classic novels.

It was shot off the coast of Maine with a budget of $1.5 million.

Rosemont had to pay $25,000 to the Kipling estate. Although the work was in the public domain in the US it was still in copyright in other territories.

== Plot summary ==
Harvey Cheyne (Jonathan Kahn) is the spoiled son of Harvey Cheyne Sr., a wealthy shipping tycoon. After failing to have a steward dismissed for disobeying his demands for a bottle of whiskey, he sneaks a cigar from his father and falls overboard after becoming ill while smoking.

Harvey is rescued by Manuel (Ricardo Montalban), a fisherman working aboard a ship commanded by Captain Troop (Karl Malden) which has only begun its’ voyage to catch fish for the season. Captain Troop denies Harvey’s insistence that he be immediately returned despite being promised a reward.

Initially, the wayward young man struggles to gain the respect of the crew while they continue to ply their trade onboard the ship. Gradually, he slowly earns their grudging admiration as he learns to work.

One of the crew is a young man named Dan (Johnny Doran) who, along with crew helps Harvey adjust to life as a working man. Dan is gravely injured during some rough weather and loses his leg.

Harvey continues to work with the crew during the whole season of fishing. He is eventually returned to his home and after some time eventually takes over the shipping company from his father.

The film concludes with Harvey and Dan greeting each other as the best of friends where Dan has become the captain of his own vessel.

== Cast ==
- Karl Malden as Disko Troop
- Jonathan Kahn as Harvey Cheyne Jr.
- Johnny Doran as Dan
- Neville Brand as Little Penn
- Fred Gwynne as Long Jack
- Charles Dierkop as Tom Platt
- Jeff Corey as Salters
- Fritz Weaver as Harvey Cheyne Sr.
- Ricardo Montalban as Manuel
- Stan Haze as Cook
- Redmond Gleeson as Phillips
- Shay Duffin as Chief Steward
- Milton Frome as Mr. Atkins
- Len Wayland as McLean
