= The Cartier Affair =

- Genre: Comedy; Crime
- Written by: Brad Buckner; Eugenie Ross-Leming; Michael Devereaux; Karen Golden
- Directed by: Rod Holcomb
- Starring: David Hasselhoff; Joan Collins; Telly Savalas; Ed Lauter
- Music by: Arthur B. Rubinstein; Abby Treloggen; Cynthia Morrow
- Country of origin: United States
- Original language: English

Production
- Executive producer: Leonard Hill
- Producers: Joel Dean; Christopher Nelson; Brad Buckner; Eugenie Ross-Leming
- Cinematography: Hanania Baer
- Editor: Erwin Dumbrille
- Running time: 96 min. approx
- Production companies: Hill-Mandelker Productions; B & E Enterprises; King Features Entertainment
- Budget: $2.5 million

Original release
- Network: NBC
- Release: November 4, 1984

The Cartier Affair is a 1984 NBC TV movie that starred Knight Rider's David Hasselhoff and Dynasty's Joan Collins, which also featured Kojak's Telly Savalas.

== Plot ==
Curt Taylor (David Hasselhoff) is released from California State Prison and to settle a debt he becomes a secretary for Cartier Rand (Joan Collins) as a form of amusing punishment, so that he can steal her jewels. During the course of his employment for Cartier, He falls in love with her, which complicates his primary mission to steal from her, Cartier reciprocates his feelings and the two begin an affair.

== Cast and crew ==
Actor	Role
Joan Collins	Cartier Rand/Marilyn Hallifax
David Hasselhoff	Curtis "Curt" Taylor
Telly Savalas	Phillip "Phil" Drexler
Ed Lauter	Lyndon Dean
Steven Apostle	J J Phonopolous
Jordan Charney	Ben Foley
Joe LaDue	Russ Houser
Charles Napier	Morgan Carroll
Randi Brooks	Shirl
Rita Taggart	Monica
