= Elisabeth Brooks =

Canadian actress (1951–1997)

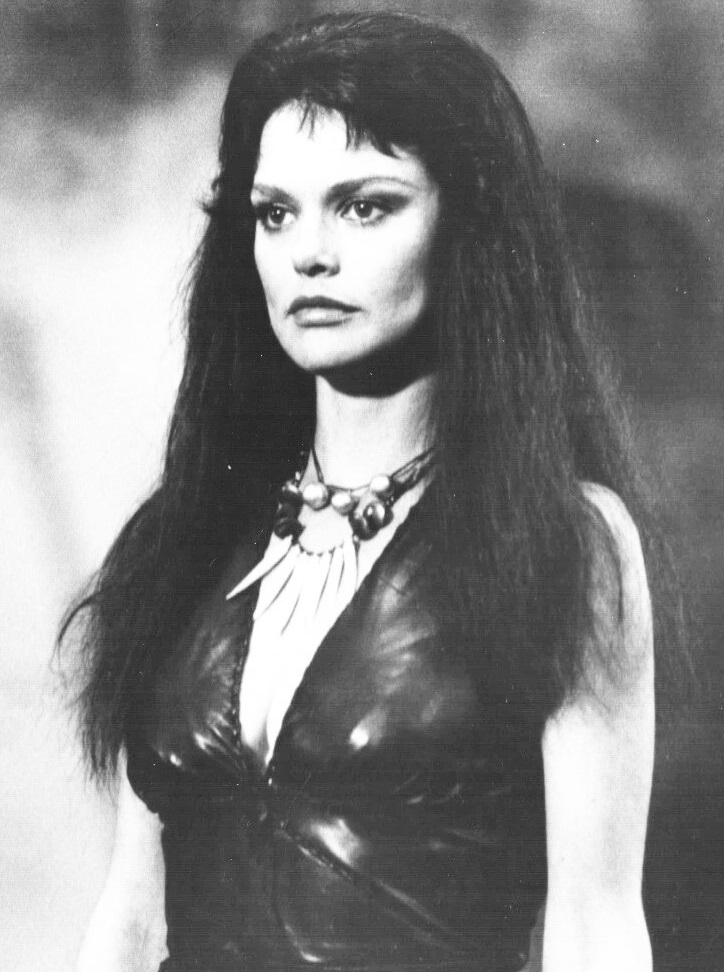
- Brooks in The Howling (1981)
- Born: Elisabeth Brooks Luyties; July 2, 1951; Toronto, Ontario, Canada
- Died: September 7, 1997 (aged 46); Palm Springs, California, U.S.
- Resting place: Forest Lawn Memorial Park, Glendale
- Occupations: Actress, singer, poet, writer
- Years active: 1974–1991
- Children: 1

Elisabeth Brooks Luyties (July 2, 1951 – September 7, 1997) was a Canadian actress. She is probably best remembered for her role as the evil, leather-clad siren Marsha Quist in The Howling (1981). Her other film appearances included Deep Space (1988) and The Forgotten One (1989).

== Life and career ==
Brooks was born on July 2, 1951, in Toronto, Ontario, and adopted by William Harrison "Sandy" Luyties Jr. and his wife Joan (née Brooks) when she was six months old. Brooks has two brothers and two sisters: Judson, Jonica, Megan, and Seth. To family and friends, Brooks was known as Lissa.

She began her acting career aged five, encompassing both stage and screen. She started appearing in television roles in the mid-1970s and managed to pursue her acting career as a single mother while working a variety of jobs to support herself and her son. She had a brief role in Rich Man, Poor Man (1976), and then appeared regularly on the soap opera Days of Our Lives, and in popular television series such as The Rockford Files, Kolchak: The Night Stalker, Hart to Hart, Starsky and Hutch, The Six Million Dollar Man, and Emergency!

After a two and half year struggle with brain cancer, Brooks died in Haven Hospice near her home in Palm Springs, California, at the age of 46. Brooks was survived by her son Jeremy and her best friend and ex-girlfriend Kristy McNichol, her death coming four days shy of McNichol's 35th birthday.
