= Keller Entertainment Group =

American film and television production company

- Formerly: Inter Planetary Pictures (1976-1987); American First-Run Studios (1987-1996)
- Founded: 1976; 50 years ago
- Founder: Max Keller; Michelline Keller
- Headquarters: Los Angeles, California, United States
- Products: Film; Television
- Website: https://kellerentertainment.com/

Keller Entertainment Group (formerly Inter Planetary Pictures and American First Run Studios) is a film and television production company that was founded in 1976 by law attroney and husband and wife duo Max and Micheline Keller. It is best known for the 1990s TV series Tarzan, Acapulco H.E.A.T. and Conan the Adventurer, as well as TV movies like Stranger in Our House and Kent State.

== History ==
The company made its start in 1976 when the Kellers founded Inter Planetary Pictures after the Kellers left the law industry. Its first known venture was a collaboration with Donny and Marie Osmond's Osmond Productions for distributing pictures in partnership. The company got its start as a theatrical distributor.

After releasing a string of theatrical movies as a distributor, the company made its big break, producing the 1978 TV movie for NBC, Stranger in Our House, directed by a then-unknown Wes Craven. After the success, the company mostly stopped distributing theatrical films, so they turned its focus to a television production subsidiary Inter Planetary Productions Corporation.

After that, the company another big success, with another hit television movie for NBC, Kent State, in partnership with Osmond Productions. The company followed its successes by an endless string of television movies throughout the 1980s, in addition to occasional theatrical releases, such as Deadly Blessing and Now and Forever. In 1984, the company entered into a joint venture with Curb Records to produce its only film under the partnership under the name Inter Planetary Curb, Voyage of the Rock Aliens, which became a cult classic.

In 1987, the company won another hit with the television movie for HBO, Conspiracy: The Trial of the Chicago 8, which was another smash hit that won a Cable Ace Award for Best Dramatic Special. Later that year, the company was renamed from Inter Planetary Productions to American First-Run Studios after executives featured they mistook science fiction works. In 1988, the company licensed the live-action TV rights to the Tarzan series from Edgar Rice Burroughs to develop a pilot film, Tarzan in Manhattan, aired in 1989.

After making exclusively television movies, the company turned its attention to television series. The company first partnered with Balenciaga Productions on the company's first weekly television series, Tarzan, which was syndicated by Worldvision Enterprises. It ended up airing from 1991 to 1994. The company next teamed up on the television series Acapulco H.E.A.T., which was syndicated by All American Television, and aired from 1993 to 1994.

After that the company partnered with SeaGull Entertainment (a company led by Henry Siegel) to start Keller Siegel Entertainment to produce its only TV series, Tarzan: The Epic Adventures, which only aired from 1996 to 1997 due to the bankruptcy of SeaGull Entertainment. The company next made its two more television series, with Balenciaga Productions, Conan the Adventurer, and a second season of Acapulco H.E.A.T., both of these were syndicated by Western International Syndication. In 1996, the company signed a deal with ZDF for its library of television productions. The company went inactive after the last TV show asides from the library of unannounced projects, mostly none of which gone to fruition.

In 2006, it partnered with George Edde to form Keller Edde Studios. The company briefly went out of inactive status, when the company was executive producer of a theatrical film, Hands of Stone, which was released by The Weinstein Company in 2016.

== Productions ==
=== Theatrical films ===
Title	Release date	Notes
Let the Balloon Go	March 1977	U.S. distribution only; produced by Film Australia
Twentieth Century Oz	September 14, 1977	U.S. distribution only; produced by Count Features, Davis Equities Corporation Investment Partnerships, O&O Associates Ltd. and The Australian Film Commission
Goin' Coconuts	October 6, 1978	Distributed by Osmond Entertainment
Deadly Blessing	August 14, 1981	Distributed by United Artists, co-production with PolyGram Pictures
Now and Forever	March 18, 1983	Distribution only; produced by Now & Forever Film Partnership
Voyage of the Rock Aliens	March 9, 1984	Co-production with Curb Entertainment
The 13th Alley	June 13, 2008	Distribution only; produced by Super Chief Films
Hands of Stone	August 26, 2016	Distributed by The Weinstein Company, produced by Fuego Films, Vertical Media, Panama Film Commission and Epicentral Studios

=== Television films ===
Title	Air date	Network	Notes
Stranger in Our House	October 31, 1978	NBC	co-production with Finnegan Associates
Kent State	February 8, 1981	NBC	co-production with Osmond Productions
Grambling's White Tiger	October 4, 1981	NBC	
A Summer to Remember	March 27, 1985	CBS	
Betrayed by Innocence	March 1, 1986	CBS	
Dreams of Gold: The Mel Fisher Story	November 15, 1986	CBS	co-production with La Rosh Productions
Women of Valor	November 23, 1986	CBS	co-production with Jeni Productions and Pendragon Entertainment
Conspiracy: The Trial of the Chicago 8	May 16, 1987	HBO	co-production with HBO Showcase
The Secret Life of Kathy McCormick	October 7, 1988	NBC	co-production with Tamara Asseyev Productions and New World Television
Swimsuit	February 19, 1989	NBC	co-production with Musifilm Productions
Tarzan in Manhattan	April 15, 1989	CBS	
Casey's Gift: For Love of a Child	September 24, 1990	NBC	
1362: The Kensington Enigma	April 14, 2007	International syndication	Distribution only; produced by United International Film Corp.

=== Direct-to-video film ===
Title	Release date	Notes
Buck Naked Arson	April 24, 2001	distributed by Velocity Home Entertainment; co-production with Redwood Shires Productions

=== Television series ===
Title	Network	Distributor	Air dates	Notes
Tarzan	First-run syndication	Worldvision Enterprises	October 6, 1991-May 1994	co-production with Balenciaga Productions, Dune, TF1, Producciones Telemex, Producciones UINIC and William F. Cooke Productions
Acapulco H.E.A.T.	First-run syndication	All-American Television (season 1); Western International Syndication (season 2)	September 28, 1993-May 21, 1994; September 23, 1998-June 5, 1999	co-production with Balenciaga Productions, M6 Films, CNC, Les Films du Triangle Film Groupe S. A. (season 1) and France Triangle Films (season 2)
Cyberkidz	International syndication	Keller Entertainment Group	1994	co-production with United Productions
Tarzan: The Epic Adventures	First-run syndication	SeaGull Entertainment	August 28, 1996-May 25, 1997	
Conan the Adventurer	First-run syndication	Western International Syndication	September 22, 1997-May 25, 1998	co-production with Balenciaga Entertainment
