= Ida Koverman =

American film executive (b. 1876, d. 1954)

- Born: Ida Ranous Brockway; May 15, 1876; Cincinnati, Ohio
- Died: November 24, 1954 (aged 78); Los Angeles
- Occupations: executive secretary to Louis B. Mayer (1928-1951) director of public relations (1951-1954)
- Employer: MGM
- Political party: Republican Party (United States)
- Spouse: Oscar Henry Koverman (1910-1923)

Ida Brockway "Kay" Koverman (May 15, 1876 – November 24, 1954) was an American film executive. She is best known as the woman who "ran MGM" as Louis B. Mayer's executive secretary and, later, director of public relations for the studio.

== Early life and work ==
Ida Brockway was born on May 15, 1876, in Cincinnati. As a teenager, she worked in a local jewelry store. After attending business school, she became a stenographer and joined the U. S. Customs office in Cincinnati. In the wake of a sensational scandal, in 1910, she married Oscar H. Koverman. She then moved to New York where she held various jobs until she was hired by the company Gold Fields American Development Corporation (GFADC), not Herbert Hoover's better known Consolidated Gold Fields of South Africa. Oscar and Ida divorced in 1923. He remarried and died tragically in 1934.

After moving to California, Ida Koverman worked as the executive secretary of the Los Angeles County Central Committee of the state Republican Party. Working alongside engineer-entrepreneur Ralph Arnold, and allying with like-minded women leaders, she helped to lead the vanguard that won the White House for Herbert Hoover in 1928.

== Career at MGM ==
In 1929, Louis B. Mayer hired Koverman as his executive secretary. Previously, she had facilitated Mayer's entre into the state Republican party and facilitated Mayer's relationship with Herbert Hoover. Already a well-known politico, when she joined MGM, the press noted that as "a political expert" she was employed "to keep Mr. Mayer advised politically."

Koverman's reputation continued to grow. Columnist Jimmie Fidler wrote in 1938 that "she happens to be one of the most powerful personages in the entire motion-picture industry." MGM executive Robert Vogel said she "damn near ran the studio." Koverman helped discover, develop, and mentor stars for the studio, including Robert Taylor, Nelson Eddy, Robert Montgomery, Clark Gable, Leatrice Joy, Jean Parker, Jeanette MacDonald, Elizabeth Taylor, and Judy Garland. It has been suggested that at Koverman's suggestion, MGM ran a school for young stars; Elizabeth Taylor, Judy Garland, Lana Turner, Jackie Cooper, Mickey Rooney, Peter Lawford and Donna Reed all attended.

Long known as a conservative Republican, Koverman supported causes that reflected her political persuasion. In 1947, Koverman helped form the Hollywood Republican Committee with Robert Montgomery and George Murphy. She campaigned for Thomas E. Dewey in 1948 and for Richard Nixon's 1950 senate run.

It is alleged that Howard Hughes once offered her $1000 a week to work for him at RKO. Koverman declined. She worked as Louis B. Mayer's executive secretary until 1951, when Nicholas Schenck made her head of public relations for MGM.

Ida Koverman died on November 24, 1954, in Los Angeles.

== In popular culture ==
Koverman appears as a character in two biopics about Judy Garland: Rainbow (1978, played by Rue McClanahan) and Life with Judy Garland: Me and My Shadows (2001, played by Rosemary Dunsmore). Koverman is also a character in the 1985 film Malice in Wonderland (played by Bonnie Bartlett).

Koverman appears as a character in Adriana Trigiani's novel All the Stars in the Heavens.
