= Jerome Kass =

American screenwriter and author

- Born: Jerome Allan Kass; April 21, 1937; Chicago, Illinois, U.S.
- Died: October 22, 2015 (aged 78); New York City, U.S.
- Education: Stuyvesant High School; New York University; Brandeis University
- Occupations: Screenwriter; author
- Spouse(s): Artha Schwartz Delia Ephron (m. 1982)
- Children: 2
- Parent(s): Sidney Kass; Celia Gorman

Jerome Allan Kass (April 21, 1937 – October 22, 2015) was an American screenwriter and author. He wrote Queen of the Stardust Ballroom in 1975 and Ballroom in 1978, which were nominated for an Emmy and Tony, respectively.

== Biography ==
Kass was born in Chicago to Sidney Kass and Celia Gorman, and had two sisters, Francine and Gail. The family moved to the Bronx, where Kass went to school, attending Stuyvesant High School before graduating from New York University. He entered the graduate program for English, then transferred to Brandeis University.

He was married to Artha Schwartz, with whom he had two children, Julie and Adam. They later divorced, and Kass married Delia Ephron in 1982. Kass died of prostate cancer in Manhattan on October 22, 2015.

== Filmography ==
Production of films (14 credits)

1. Young Marrieds at Play (play) (1971)
2. Letters from Three Lovers (1973)
3. A Brand New Life (1973)
4. Queen of the Stardust Ballroom (TV Movie) (1975)
5. Ballroom (1978)
6. My Old Man (1979)
7. The Black Stallion Returns (1983)
8. The Fighter (1983)
9. Scorned and Swindled (story) (1984)
10. Evergreen (1985) - 3 épisodes
11. En route, les enfants! (teleplay) (1989)
12. Dernier souhait, dernier soupire (teleplay) (1992)
13. The Only Way Out (teleplay) (1993)
14. Secrets (teleplay) (1995)

Special Thanks (1 credit)

- First Period (2007)
