= William Hogan (author) =

American novelist and film producer (born 1937)

William Hogan (born 1937) is an American novelist and film producer.

== Life ==
Hogan was born in Kansas City and grew up in California. He has graduate degrees in English, theology, and philosophy. He has worked as a high school English teacher, a television executive, and movie producer.

== Works ==
Hogan is best known for his coming-of-age novel The Quartzsite Trip (Atheneum Books, 1980). The book, set largely in the town of Quartzsite, Arizona, is a cult classic of which Kirkus Reviews said, "[T]here's an innocence of time and culture laid out here that is sweet and true: the trip is irresistible, as good as American Graffiti, and maybe--for its sculpted, more than nostalgic shape--even better."

His second novel, entitled The Year of the Mongoose (Atheneum, 1981) was not nearly as well-received, with one critic dubbing it "a tired, toothless, virtually plotless satire on the network TV biz".

Hogan was also a partner in Ten-Four Productions, a movie company based in California in the 1970s and 1980s. The company's work includes Rainbow, a made-for-television biopic about actress Judy Garland, and one season of the television series Harper Valley PTA.
