= Evergreen (miniseries) =

- Genre: Historical drama Drama
- Written by: Jerome Kass
- Directed by: Fielder Cook
- Starring: Lesley Ann Warren; Armand Assante; Ian McShane; Betty Buckley; Brian Dennehy; Robert Vaughn; Katherine Borowitz; Joan Allen; Boyd Gaines; Barbara Montgomery; Jan Tříska
- Composer: Laurence Rosenthal
- Country of origin: United States
- Original language: English
- No. of episodes: 3

Production
- Producer: Philip Barry
- Cinematography: Woody Omens
- Editors: Gene Fowler Jr. Marjorie Fowler; Bud S. Isaacs; Andrew Cohen
- Running time: 60 minutes
- Production company: Edgar J. Scherick Associates

Original release
- Network: NBC
- Release: February 24 – February 26, 1985

Evergreen is an American television miniseries that aired on NBC from February 24–26, 1985, starring Lesley Ann Warren as a Polish immigrant to America, and based on the novel by Belva Plain.

== Plot summary ==
Anna, a Jewish girl, arrives in America from Poland in 1909. She rises from penniless maid to wealthy matriarch, torn by her love for two men, her husband and an aristocrat. The six-hour romantic saga spans three generations over more than 50 years.

== Cast ==
- Lesley Ann Warren as Anna Friedman
- Armand Assante as Joseph Friedman
- Ian McShane as Paul Lerner
- Betty Buckley as Mrs. Bradford
- Brian Dennehy as Matthew Malone
- Robert Vaughn as John Bradford
- Katherine Borowitz as Ruth
- Joan Allen as Iris Friedman
- Boyd Gaines as Chris Bradford
- Barbara Montgomery as Celeste
- Jan Tříska as Dr. Theo Stoller
- Jackie Burroughs as Dorothy
- Patricia Barry as Mrs. Lerner
- Kate Burton as Agatha Bradford
- Ron Rifkin as Solly

== Reception ==
The Los Angeles Times review complained that the story was "simple, straightforward and entirely predictable. So few twists and turns does Jerome Kass' script take that the family's one dark secret remains just that, with only the audience the wiser. There is no dramatic payoff."

== Awards and nominations ==
Primetime Emmy Award

- Primetime Emmy Award for Outstanding Art Direction for a Miniseries or Movie (won) - Jan Scott, Charles C. Bennett, David Davis, Robert Drumheller, Jacques M. Bradette
- Primetime Emmy Award for Outstanding Cinematography for a Miniseries or Movie - Woody Omens (nominated)
- Primetime Emmy Award for Outstanding Costumes for a Miniseries, Movie or a Special - Julie Weiss (nominated)
