= The Forgotten One (film) =

- Directed by: Phillip Badger
- Written by: Phillip Badger
- Produced by: Peter Garrity
- Starring: Kristy McNichol; Terry O'Quinn
- Release date: October 1989
- Running time: 89 minutes
- Country: United States
- Language: English

The Forgotten One is a 1989 American supernatural thriller film starring Kristy McNichol and Terry O'Quinn.

== Plot ==
A writer who is recently widowed moves into a Victorian house that may be haunted. The writer is attracted to his beautiful new neighbor, yet finds himself being seduced by the spirit of a woman murdered in his house one hundred years ago.

== Cast ==
- Terry O'Quinn as Bob Anderson
- Kristy McNichol as Barbara Stupple
- Blair Parker as Evelyn James
- Elisabeth Brooks as Carla
- Michael K. Osborn as Dillon
- Ed Battle as Bum
- Dwayne Carrington as Realtor
