= Rainbow (1978 film) =

1978 television film about Judy Garland directed by Jackie Cooper

- Genre: Biography; Drama; Music
- Based on: Rainbow: The Stormy Life of Judy Garland by Christopher Finch
- Written by: John McGreevey
- Directed by: Jackie Cooper
- Starring: Andrea McArdle; Don Murray; Michael Parks; Piper Laurie; Rue McClanahan
- Music by: Charles Fox
- Country of origin: United States
- Original language: English

Production
- Executive producers: Greg Strangis; William Hogan
- Producer: Peter Dunne
- Cinematography: Howard Schwartz
- Editor: Jerry Dronsky
- Running time: 97 minutes
- Production company: Ten-Four Productions

Original release
- Network: NBC
- Release: November 6, 1978

Rainbow is a 1978 American made-for-television biographical musical drama film which chronicles the early years of singer-actress Judy Garland, portrayed by Andrea McArdle. Directed by Jackie Cooper, it was written by John McGreevey based on the 1975 book Rainbow: The Stormy Life of Judy Garland by Christopher Finch. It originally aired on NBC Monday Night at the Movies on November 6, 1978. The casting of McArdle as Judy Garland was heavily criticized at the time, as the actress did not resemble nor sound remotely like Garland.

== Synopsis ==
The film depicts the life and struggles of Judy Garland during her early years in vaudeville, and follows her through her illustrious and highly publicized rise to stardom at Metro-Goldwyn-Mayer studios; her trials as a youngster in dealing with the movie studio system that held her back while her mother was pushing her to excel; and the backstage joy and heartbreak during the filming of The Wizard of Oz (1939).

== Cast ==
- Andrea McArdle as Judy Garland
- Don Murray as Frank Gumm
- Michael Parks as Roger Edens
- Piper Laurie as Ethel Gumm
- Rue McClanahan as Ida Koverman
- Jack Carter as George Jessel
- Nicholas Pryor as Bill Gilmore
- Donna Pescow as Jimmie Gumm
- Martin Balsam as Louis B. Mayer
- Johnny Doran as Jackie Cooper

== Award ==
Emmy Award

- 1979: Primetime Emmy Award for Outstanding Cinematography for a Limited Series or a Special – Howard Schwartz
