= Johnny Doran (actor) =

American child actor (born 1962)

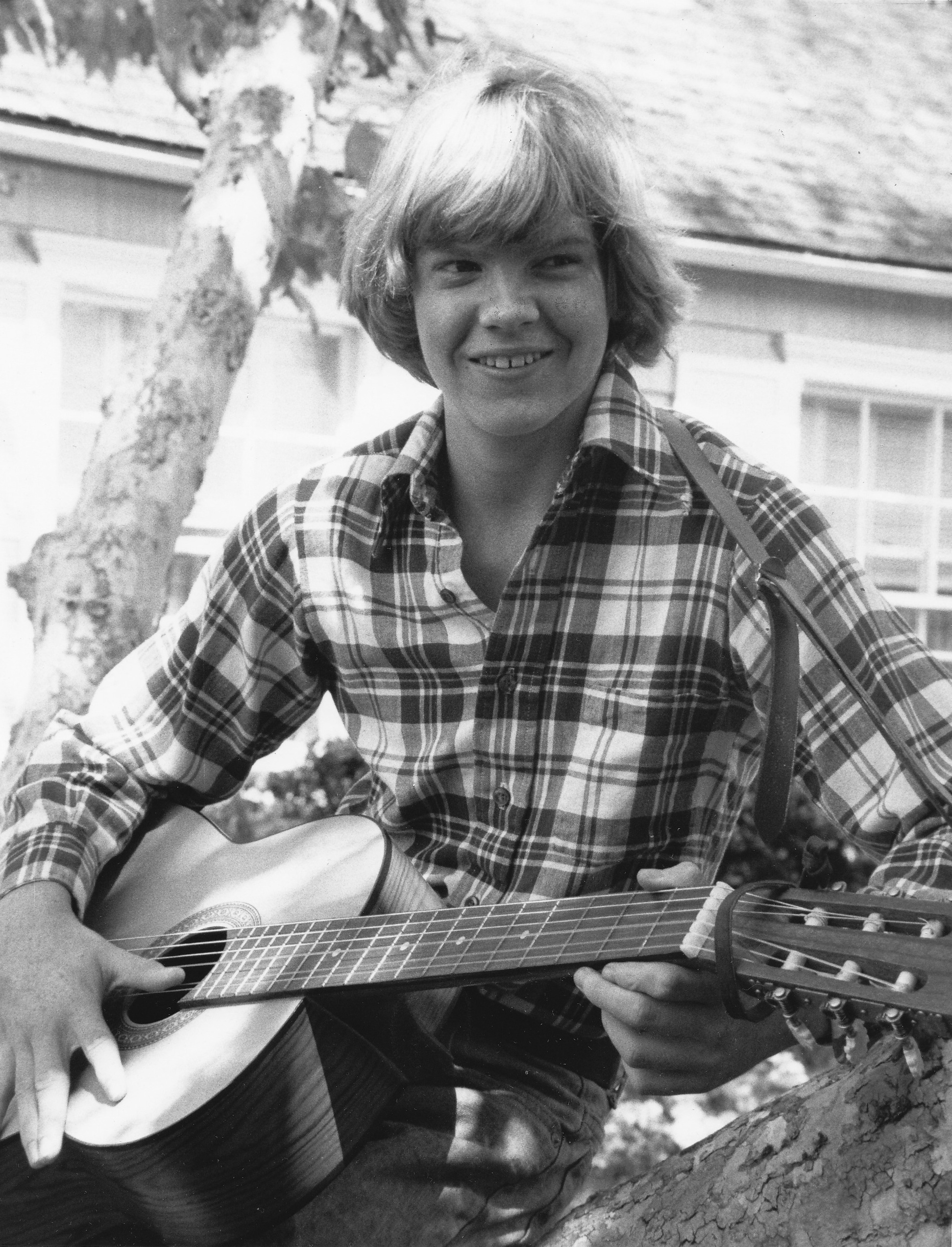
- Johnny Doran in 1977
- Born: John Alan Doran; May 25, 1962 (age 64); Greenwich, Connecticut, United States
- Occupation: Actor
- Years active: 1971–1982, 2022

Johnny Doran (born John Alan Doran, May 25, 1962) is an American former child actor. Discovered by a talent scout while performing George M. Cohan songs with his younger brother at P. J. Clarke's saloon in New York City, Doran began his acting career in the theatre, appearing as John Henry West in the off-Broadway production of F. Jasmine Addams in 1971, as Bobby Collins in the Broadway production of Children! Children! in 1972 and as Hughie Cooper in the national touring production of Finishing Touches from 1973 to 1974.

After establishing himself in the New York theatre, Doran transitioned to work in feature films, appearing in principal roles in From the Mixed-Up Files of Mrs. Basil E. Frankweiler and Treasure of Matecumbe, as well as television films, including the ABC Afterschool Special, The Pinballs, the ABC made-for-television movie Captains Courageous and the NBC made-for-television movie Rainbow.

In addition to his film roles, Doran also guest-starred on various episodic television series of the 1970s, including Isis, The Fantastic Journey and Little House on the Prairie, as well as co-starring as Tim on the first-run syndicated series Salty and as Mark Mulligan on the NBC comedy-drama series Mulligan's Stew.

Doran practices law in Arizona.

== Filmography ==
- Robot Chicken (TV) .... Baron Dark (1 episode, 2022)
- Superstition (1982) .... Charlie
- The Wave (1981) (TV) .... Robert
- Rainbow (1978) (TV) .... Jackie Cooper
- The Bastard (1978) (TV) .... Jeremy
- Captains Courageous (1977) (TV) .... Dan
- The Pinballs (1977) (TV) .... Harvey
- Mulligan's Stew (1977) TV Series .... Mark Mulligan (Starring)
- Little House on the Prairie .... Timothy Farrell (1 episode, 1977)
- The Fantastic Journey .... Nikki (1 episode, 1977)
- Ark II .... Alan (1 episode, 1976)
- Captains and the Kings (1976) (mini) TV Series .... Young Joseph
- Treasure of Matecumbe (1976) .... Davie
- The Secrets of Isis .... Randy Martin (1 episode, 1975)
- Nakia ...Pete (1 episode, 1974)
- Salty (1974) TV Series .... Tim (Starring)
- From the Mixed-Up Files of Mrs. Basil E. Frankweiler (1973) .... Jamie Kincaid

== Bibliography ==
- Holmstrom, John. The Moving Picture Boy: An International Encyclopaedia from 1895 to 1995. Norwich, Michael Russell, 1996, p. 339-340.
