= Children! Children! =

Play by Jack Horrigan

- Written by: Jack Horrigan
- Genre: Mystery; Thriller

Premiere
- Date: 7 March 1972
- Place: Ritz Theatre (New York City)
- Directed by: Joseph Hardy

Children! Children! is a play written by Jack Horrigan and directed on Broadway by Joseph Hardy. It starred Gwen Verdon in her first non-musical role with Dennis Patrick, Elizabeth Hubbard, Josef Sommer, and Johnny Doran in his Broadway debut.

It was performed at the Ritz Theatre on March 7, 1972, after thirteen previews beginning on February 24, 1972.

== Synopsis ==
The setting is the apartment of the Collins family in the Gramercy Park neighborhood of New York City, two hours before New Year's Eve.

Philip and Evelyn Collins, parents of preteens Mark, Bobby and Susan, attend a new year's party with Dr. Yaeger and his wife Peg. The new babysitter Helen Giles, having just recovered from a nervous breakdown, is subjected to the children's devious and sadistic abuse, sexual passes, and a fall down the stairs. The returning parents believe the sitter is still mentally unsound, after which the parent's own viciousness is revealed to be the source of the children's behavior.

== Cast ==
- Gwen Verdon as Helen Giles
- Elizabeth Hubbard as Evelyn Collins
- Dennis Patrick as Philip Collins
- Shawn Campbell as Mark Collins
- Johnny Doran as Bobby Collins (Broadway debut)
- Elaine Hyman as Peg Yaeger
- Ariane Munker as Susan Collins
- Josef Sommer as Dr. Karl Yaeger

== Production ==
It was produced for $125,000 by Arthur Whitelaw and Seth Harrison, in association with Ben Gerard.

== Reception ==
About this mystery/thriller, the New York Post review said, "The tension is continuous."
