= Women of Valor =

- DVD cover
- Genre: Drama; War
- Written by: Jonas McCord
- Directed by: Buzz Kulik
- Starring: Susan Sarandon; Kristy McNichol
- Theme music composer: Georges Delerue
- Country of origin: United States
- Original language: English

Production
- Executive producers: Jonas McCord; Philip L. Parslow
- Producers: Buzz Kulik; Carol Davies (uncredited)
- Cinematography: Mike Fash
- Editor: Les Green
- Running time: 100 minutes
- Production companies: Jeni Productions; Inter Planetary Productions Corporation; Inter Planetary; Interplanetary Pictures Productions

Original release
- Network: CBS
- Release: November 23, 1986

Women of Valor is a 1986 American made-for-television war drama film about World War II directed by Buzz Kulik and starring Susan Sarandon and Kristy McNichol. It premiered on CBS on November 23, 1986 and was released on DVD on March 10, 1998.

== Plot ==
A group of American Army nurses are captured by the Japanese in April 1942. They are marched along with American soldiers as part of the Bataan Death March. They are put in a prisoner-of-war camp in Bataan, where they spend nearly three years.

The story focuses on Lt. Margaret Ann "Maggie" Jessup, the head army nurse who survived the camp and testified against the Japanese. She lobbied for awards of valor to be given to the women prisoners, in front of the United States Congressional subcommittee years later as a colonel.

== Cast ==
- Susan Sarandon as 1LT/COL Margaret Ann Jessup
- Kristy McNichol as T.J. Nolan
- Alberta Watson as 2LT Helen Prescott
- Valerie Mahaffey as 2LT Katherine R. Grace
- Suzanne Lederer as 2LT Gail Polson
- Patrick Bishop as Captain Matome Nakayama
- Terry O'Quinn as MAJ Tom Patterson
- Neva Patterson as Lady Judith Eason
- Jay Acovone as CPT Rader

== Criticism ==
The film was generally negatively received. One of the main criticisms was that it was not realistic. The cast was also criticized for retaining their looks while trying to survive in poor conditions. The New York Times stated the story should have given more attention to the people rather than the situations.
