= The Pinballs =

1976 novel by Betsy Byars

- First edition (publ. HarperCollins)
- Author: Betsy Byars
- Language: English
- Publication date: 1976

The Pinballs is a 1976 young adult novel by American author Betsy Byars. It is about three foster children, Carlie, Harvey and Thomas J., who have been taken in by the Masons, a couple who have cared for many other foster children and also have some personal problems. Carlie compares the children to pinballs, controlled by external forces and at the mercy of fate. It won the 1977 Josette Frank Award, the 1980 William Allen White Children's Book Award, and the 1980 California Young Reader Medal. The Pinballs received the Golden Archer Award, a student-choice book award sponsored by the Wisconsin Educational Media and Technology Association.

== Plot ==
Carlie lives in a foster home with the Masons, an infertile couple. The Masons have been foster parents for 17 kids. Carlie is the most outwardly hostile toward her situation, and quite skeptical about having trust in others. She plans to stay there until her family works out their problems. She must stay because her last stepfather gave her a concussion. Two other children arrive, Harvey, who has two broken legs, and Thomas J., who grew up living with two elderly twin sisters who found him abandoned in front of their farmhouse when he was two. Thomas J. means well but has never learned how to express himself. He gets help from Mr. Mason who had similar problems in his childhood. Harvey is very unhappy and needs others badly, although he has trouble admitting it. Eventually, he confesses that his father accidentally ran over his legs with his car while drunk, even though he originally told everyone he was a quarterback and his legs were broken playing football. Before the injury, his parents fought and his mother left to join a commune. His father denies that she ever wrote back to Harvey since she left. At first, Carlie feels neglected. She considers running away but eventually decides to take charge of her life and stop being a passive "pinball" bounced from home to home. When Harvey is in the hospital after his legs became infected, Carlie, and Thomas J. give him a puppy for his birthday, which he always wanted and it helps him get him through the pain. In the end, Carlie determines that the three of them are not pinballs, because, unlike pinballs, they can control where they are going and can be helpful to each other.

== TV movie ==
In 1977, the book was made into an episode of the ABC Afterschool Special series, starring Kristy McNichol as Carlie, Johnny Doran as Harvey and Sparky Marcus as Thomas J.

Awards
Preceded by Summer of the Monkeys	Winner of the William Allen White Children's Book Award; 1980	Succeeded by The Great Gilly Hopkins
