= My Old Man (film) =

- Genre: Drama
- Written by: Jerome Kass
- Story by: Ernest Hemingway
- Directed by: John Erman
- Starring: Kristy McNichol; Warren Oates; Eileen Brennan; Mark Arnold
- Music by: Dominic Frontiere
- Country of origin: United States
- Original language: English

Production
- Executive producers: Carolyn McNichol; Jerry Zeitman
- Producer: Robert Halmi
- Production locations: Saratoga Race Track, Saratoga Springs, New York
- Cinematography: Larry Pizer
- Editor: Argyle Nelson
- Running time: 100 minutes
- Production company: Robert Halmi

Original release
- Network: CBS
- Release: December 7, 1979

My Old Man is a 1979 American made-for-television drama film starring Kristy McNichol, Warren Oates and Eileen Brennan, directed by John Erman. The film, written by Jerome Kass, was based on the Ernest Hemingway 1923 short story "My Old Man", which had previously been adapted for the 1950 film Under My Skin. The TV film was originally broadcast on CBS on December 7, 1979.

== Plot ==
Frank Butler is a cantankerous unlucky horse trainer who wins big at the track and buys a horse for his jockey daughter Jo in an attempt to reconcile their troubled relationship.

== Cast ==
- Kristy McNichol - Jo Butler
- Warren Oates - Frank Butler
- Eileen Brennan - Marie
- Joseph Maher - Phil Kiley
- Joseph Leon - Shimmy
- Jess Osuna - Matt
- David Margulies - Chubby
- Mark Arnold - Roy Kiley
- Michael Jeter - George Gardner
- William Duell - Rooster

== See also ==
- List of films about horses
