= Cop Rock =

1990 American police procedural musical television series

- Genre: Musical; Police procedural
- Created by: Steven Bochco; William M. Finkelstein
- Starring: Anne Bobby; Barbara Bosson; David Gianopoulos; Larry Joshua; James McDaniel; Ron McLarty; Mick Murray; Peter Onorati; Ronny Cox; Vondie Curtis-Hall; Paul McCrane
- Theme music composer: Randy Newman
- Opening theme: "Under the Gun" performed by Randy Newman
- Composers: Randy Newman; Mike Post; Stephen Geyer; Amanda McBroom; Donald Markowitz; Greg Edmonson; Brock Walsh; Ronald Boustead; Kathleen Wilhoite; Jim Wilhoite; Harvey Estrada
- Country of origin: United States
- Original language: English
- No. of seasons: 1
- No. of episodes: 11

Production
- Executive producer: Steven Bochco
- Producers: Gregory Hoblit; Charles Haid; Michael M. Robin
- Cinematography: Tom Sigel; Roy H. Wagner
- Editors: Joe Ann Fogle; Chuck Weiss; Stephen Mark; Michael B. Hoggan
- Camera setup: Multi-camera
- Running time: 48–49 minutes
- Production companies: Steven Bochco Productions; 20th Century Fox Television
- Budget: $13.2–22 million

Original release
- Network: ABC
- Release: September 26 – December 26, 1990

Cop Rock is an American police procedural musical television series created by Steven Bochco and William M. Finkelstein for ABC. It premiered on September 26, 1990, and broadcast eleven episodes before concluding on December 26, following both a critical and commercial failure.

== Premise ==
Following the Los Angeles Police Department, Cop Rock features an ensemble cast of police officers and detectives as they solve crimes across the city, with the series mixing musical and choreography throughout storylines and to introduce new characters. In its main storyline, Captain John Hollander (Larry Joshua) investigates the involvement of Detective Vincent LaRusso (Peter Onorati) in the execution of murder suspect Tyrone Weeks (Art Kimbro). Subplots include Detective Ralph Ruskin's (Ron McLarty) growing jealousy of his wife Officer Vicki Quinn (Anne Bobby), and her friendship with Officer Andy Campo (David Gianopoulos); Quinn helping drug addict Patricia Spence (Kathleen Wilhoite) recover her baby which Spence had sold for $200; and the relationship between corrupt Mayor Louise Plank (Barbara Bosson) and Chief Roger Kendrick (Ronny Cox).

== Cast ==
=== Main ===
- Anne Bobby as Officer Vicki Quinn
- Barbara Bosson as Mayor Louise Plank
- David Gianopoulos as Officer Andy Campo
- Larry Joshua as Captain John Hollander
- James McDaniel as Officer Franklin Rose
- Ron McLarty as Detective Ralph Ruskin
- Mick Murray as Detective Joseph Gaines
- Peter Onorati as Detective Vincent LaRusso
- Ronny Cox as Chief Roger Kendrick
- Vondie Curtis-Hall as Commander Warren Osborne
- Paul McCrane as Detective Bob McIntyre

=== Recurring ===
- William Thomas Jr. as Detective William Donald Potts
- Kathleen Wilhoite as Patricia Spence
- Teri Austin as Trish Vaughn
- Dennis Lipscomb as Sidney Weitz
- Jeffrey Alan Chandler as Ray Rodbart
- CCH Pounder as Willa Phelan

== Episodes ==
No.	Title	Directed by	Written by	Original release date	Prod. code	U.S viewers (millions)	Rating/share (households)
1	"Pilot"	Gregory Hoblit	Steven Bochco & William M. Finkelstein	September 26, 1990	2101	14.3	10.3/19
An arrested gang in control of Los Angeles ("We Got the Power") is acquitted of all charges of drug distribution due to a lack of evidence. One of the gang's vehicles is pursued by the police. Drug dealer Tyrone Weeks flees the scene after shooting and killing a police officer, and the driver is arrested. After Weeks is captured in his home, an enraged Detective Vincent LaRusso executes him; fellow police officers tamper with the crime scene to make it appear LaRusso acted in self-defense. Meanwhile, Officer Vicki Quinn is unable to convince drug addict Patricia Spence to enter rehab. Spence later sells her baby daughter for $200 ("Sandman"). Additional music: Detective Ralph Ruskin thinks of his wife ("She Chose Me"), Mayor Louise Plank accepts a bribe ("She's The One"), and a jury gives a verdict ("He's Guilty"). All songs for this episode were written by Randy Newman.
2	"Ill-Gotten Gaines"	Gregory Hoblit	Steven Bochco; William M. Finkelstein; John Romano	October 3, 1990	2102	9.5	7.2/13
At the funeral of the police officer who was shot and killed, his cop partner Franklin Rose gives a eulogy ("How Much I Love You"). Unconvinced about the proposed events leading to Weeks' death, Captain John Hollander begins to interrogate LaRusso's colleagues. After Hollander meets with Quinn, she begins to question what she knows about her husband Ruskin ("If That Isn't Love"). Rose is given a new partner, Detective Joseph Gaines, and a burglary in a mansion is investigated ("Good Life" and "Lineup"), where LaRusso questions the housekeeper and finds the thief was her boyfriend. At home with his wife and son, Hollander talks about their family's financial state ("Gonna Be Alright"). Songs for this episode collectively composed by Mike Post, Stephen Geyer, Amanda McBroom, Donald Markowitz and Greg Edmonson.
3	"Happy Mudder's Day"	Charles Haid	Steven Bochco & William M. Finkelstein & John Romano	October 10, 1990	2103	8.8	6.7/12
As the investigation grows, Hollander questions Detective William Donald Potts, promising qualified immunity if he reveals what happened to Weeks; Potts agrees to talk. Rose and Gaines respond to a domestic violence call, where the latter shows he does not know how to deescalate the situation without Rose's help; they leave after the couple promises to stop fighting ("Nobody's Fault"). At night, LaRusso's girlfriend Nikki, a mud wrestler at a nightclub ("I Hate Love"), is held at gunpoint by a drug dealer who gives up after LaRusso shows no intention of negotiating to save Nikki. Plank gets plastic surgery to improve her chances in the upcoming election as a U.S. Senator ("Perfection"). As the day concludes ("Garbage In, Garbage Out"), Hollander tells LaRusso he is under arrest. Additional music: Chief Roger Kendrick remembers his early days, where he rides a horse through Los Angeles in a dream sequence ("Hear The Doggy"). Songs for this episode collectively composed by Stephen Geyer, Amanda McBroom, Donald Markowitz, Brock Walsh, Greg Edmonson and Ronald Boustead.
4	"A Three-Corpse Meal"	Fred Gerber	Story by : Steven Bochco & William M. Finkelstein & John Romano; Teleplay by : William M. Finkelstein & Toni Graphia & John Romano	October 17, 1990	2104	9.8	7.2/12
After being in custody for a few days, one of LaRusso's lawyers bails him out ("Can't Keep A Good Man Down"). Contemplating suicide after selling her baby, Spence asks Quinn for help at the police station, where Hollander orders for Spence to be arrested ("You Lied"). To recover the baby, Quinn and Officer Andy Campo go undercover to meet Glen, a child trafficker ("Baby Merchant"), who is later arrested alongside his also corrupt lawyer. In an interrogation, the pair ask for immunity after agreeing to tell the police the identities of several leaders controlling a child trafficking syndicate. They also tell Quinn the location of Spence's daughter, who is safely recovered and taken into foster care. Meanwhile, LaRusso begins a sexual relationship with the female lawyer who got him out of prison, Plank reveals herself post-surgery and begins a relationship with Kendrick ("Something Happened to Me"), and Ruskin starts exercising to avoid having a heart attack ("No Pain, No Gain"). Songs for this episode collectively composed by Mike Post, Stephen Geyer, Brock Walsh, Amanda McBroom, and Donald Markowitz.
5	"The Cocaine Mutiny"	Arlene Sanford	Story by : Steven Bochco & William M. Finkelstein; Teleplay by : Steven Bochco & William M. Finkelstein & John Romano	October 24, 1990	2105	9.6	7.3/13
Several people are arrested for buying drugs from an undercover cop ("Pursuit of Happiness"). One of them, a woman serving as an assistant for a city councilman, is left off with a warning. After being arrested again, she confesses that she had been buying drugs for the councilman, who is later arrested. Detective Bob McIntyre helps a woman, Stacey Kane, fend off a stalker ("A Step Away") before beginning a relationship with her. The next day, the stalker is shot by Kane in McIntyre's presence, who quickly figures out her ruse to murder the stalker without being arrested ("Beautiful Eyes"). Meanwhile, Spence is put on probation with supervised visits with her baby daughter ("More Than Enough"). Additional music: A politician running for Governor of California tells an audience he needs more donations ("Campaign Song"). Songs for this episode collectively composed by Mike Post, Stephen Geyer, Brock Walsh, Donald Markowitz, Greg Edmonson, Kathleen Wilhoite and Jim Wilhoite.
6	"Oil of Ol' Lay"	Michael Fresco	Story by : Steven Bochco & William M. Finkelstein & John Romano; Teleplay by : Steven Bochco & William M. Finkelstein & Toni Graphia & John Romano	October 31, 1990	2106	7.6	5.8/11
Rose and Gaines help clear out a homeless encampment under a bridge ("Nowhere to Go, Nothing to Do"). The following day, Gaines decides to help a homeless man named Louis by buying him food at a diner and giving him money. After Louis shows symptoms of being mentally ill, Gaines gives up and leaves. Meanwhile, at an insurance company, Quinn and Campo are confronted by a senile man who shoots Quinn in the leg; Ruskin visits her at the hospital, where he learns her injury was merely a flesh wound. Soon after, Campo arrives and begins to sing to Quinn about his love for her ("Your Partner"), where Ruskin overhears them from outside the room and decides to murder Campo ("What am I Doing Here?"). While Kendrick is encouraged by his assistant Ozzy to begin a serious relationship with Plank ("How to Love a Woman"), LaRusso is told by his lawyers that his best option to avoid incarceration would be to make the public believe his actions towards Weeks as an "American hero" were justified ("No Problem"). Songs for this episode collectively composed by Stephen Geyer, Brock Walsh, and Amanda McBroom.
7	"Cop-a-Feeliac"	Arlene Sanford	Steven Bochco & William M. Finkelstein & John Romano & Michael Graham	November 7, 1990	2107	7.7	5.7/11
As the police force prepares for another day of work ("Let's Be Careful Out There"), multiple officers gossip about the person who gave the witness testimony against LaRusso ("What Kind Of World Do We Live In?"), unaware that it was Potts, who himself has been receiving threatening messages and burning crosses from an unknown perpetrator associated with the KKK ("Burning Crosses"). Meanwhile, Plank's assistant, Ray Rodbart, decides to resign after becoming worried that a journalist will write an article outing him as a homosexual, as he fears it will hurt Plank's chances in the election. However, a supportive Plank refuses to let him quit and later blackmails the journalist to stop them from publishing the article. Quinn returns to work, where Ruskin's jealousy continues to grow. Gaines is asked questions about Week's death, where he assures himself that his actions were professional ("I'm OK"). Beginning to stalk Quinn and Campo, Ruskin sees the pair enter a hotel, unaware that they are investigating a crime, and confronts Quinn about his speculations. After his speech receives positive feedback from the public, LaRusso attends a gala ("Brenda and The Bus Monsters"). Songs for this episode collectively composed by Mike Post and Stephen Geyer.
8	"Potts Don't Fail Me Now"	Brad Silberling	Steven Bochco & William M. Finkelstein & John Romano & Michael Graham	November 21, 1990	2108	8.7	5.9/11
While Quinn becomes annoyed with Ruskin's jealousy ("Why Can't A Man Be More Like a Woman"), Potts refuses a proposal to receive protection from a community of African-American Muslims, and later decides against testifying at LaRusso's upcoming trial. As Rose investigates the shooting of a six-year-old child ("Why Lord"), Gaines listens to a detective's barely veiled racist remarks about Rose ("Black is Black"). The detective later asks Hollander to remove Rose from the case; Hollander angrily refuses as Rose and Gaines successfully arrest the suspects ("Anybody Can Die"). Kendrick is asked various questions about LaRusso's trial, where he answers with offensive comments seen as racist, sexist, homophobic, and anti-semitic; Plank soon confronts him and Kendrick leaves. After Campo and Ruskin brawl at a bar, Quinn agrees to switch partners if she and Ruskin start going to couples' counseling. The following day, Potts is told to testify at the trial, despite the possible consequences, to "do the right thing". Additional music: Hollander misses his son's piano recital at school and later argues with his wife ("Find My Way Back Home"). Songs for this episode collectively composed by Mike Post, Stephen Geyer, and Brock Walsh.
9	"Marital Blitz"	Gilbert Shilton	Story by : Steven Bochco & William M. Finkelstein & John Romano; Teleplay by : Steven Bochco & William M. Finkelstein & Toni Graphia & John Romano	December 5, 1990	2109	6.5	4.9/9
After several police officers, including Quinn and Campo, are awarded the Los Angeles Police Medal of Valor ("Heroes All"), interviewers get Kendrick to say he believes LaRusso is innocent. Quinn later tells Campo that she has asked for a new partner and Campo shows his understanding of her decision; Campo later meets his new partner, a dull Officer Petrovich, while Quinn is paired with a rude and sexist Officer Stillman. While LaRusso's trial begins ("For the Record"), Plank decides to get back together with Kendrick on his birthday, who happily agrees. While working, Petrovich reveals her intimate feelings for Campo and kisses him ("Bumpty, Bumpty"). Soon after, Campo reports Petrovich's actions to Hollander, who dismisses the claims, and Stillman argues about being assigned to a female partner. After receiving more complaints, Hollander becomes annoyed and tells the entire police force to stop ("Quit Your Bitchin'"). At the trial, Potts tells the jury that LaRusso executed Weeks and that he wanted to tell the truth to make his family proud. Songs for this episode collectively composed by Mike Post, Stephen Geyer, and Brock Walsh.
10	"No Noose Is Good Noose"	Michael M. Robin	Story by : Steven Bochco & William M. Finkelstein & John Romano; Teleplay by : Steven Bochco & William M. Finkelstein & Toni Graphia & John Romano	December 12, 1990	2110	6.9	5.1/10
Several police officers hold a birthday party for LaRusso and present him to a stripper ("To Live and Die a Cop"). At the police station, Campo is introduced to his new partner, Officer Jessica Wolf. In couples' counseling, Quinn reveals to Ruskin that she has intimate feelings for Campo; Ruskin leaves after threatening domestic assault and later tells Quinn that he wants a divorce. While multiple female officers go undercover as prostitutes ("Choose Me" and "Tenderness"), Kendrick begins suffering from hallucinations in which he is hanged for his offensive comments ("Your Number's Up"). At LaRusso's trial, the jury finds him not guilty ("Reasonable Doubt"). Songs for this episode collectively composed by Stephen Geyer and Brock Walsh.
11	"Bang the Potts Slowly"	Fred Gerber	Story by : Steven Bochco & William M. Finkelstein & John Romano; Teleplay by : William M. Finkelstein & Toni Graphia & John Romano	December 26, 1990	2111	7.9	5.6/11
As LaRusso rejoins the police force ("Ties That Bind"), Potts is told that he can move to a different division. An investigation is initiated after multiple college students report being sexually assaulted and raped by an unknown assailant ("I Got Somethin' For You"). After receiving a warrant for one of the suspects, Donald Bruckner, the police investigate his home. However, Stillman decides to violate the warrant by entering the house, where he finds evidence of Bruckner being the rapist. McIntire confronts Stillman for committing an illegal search, meaning the evidence cannot be used due to the exclusionary rule. Soon after, Rose and Gaines arrest Bruckner without warrant, where a rape victim at the police station declares Bruckner was the assailant who raped her; Hollander calls Stillman a "bad cop" as LaRusso overhears. Meanwhile, Quinn moves out of Ruskin's house ("How Do You Say Goodbye"), Plank begins making television advertisements for her political campaign ("Clean it Up"), and LaRusso is given a proposal to have a producer create a film surrounding his case. As the final number, the cast appear out of character to sing a farewell to their audience ("We'll Ride Again"). Songs for this episode collectively composed by Stephen Geyer and Brock Walsh.

== Production ==
=== Development ===
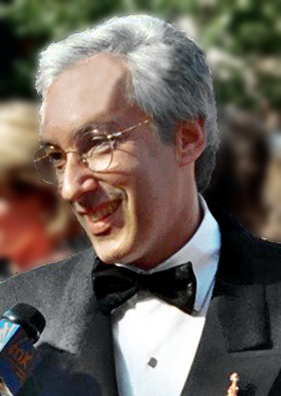
Steven Bochco developed and co-created Cop Rock with William M. Finkelstein.

In the early 1980s, a Broadway producer offered Steven Bochco a proposal to convert his series Hill Street Blues into a musical. As the plan was not practical, the proposal was declined, but Bochco kept the idea in mind and thought about doing the opposite instead, converting a Broadway show into a police procedural television series. In 1987, the American Broadcasting Company (ABC) gave Bochco a production commitment for ten of his future shows, and wanting to experiment, he developed Cop Rock as a "bold and adventurous" idea. The head of ABC Entertainment at the time, Bob Iger, was one of the only people willing to give him a chance, allowing the creation of the series. On the opportunity, James McDaniel stated that, "the media said it was impossible and that it was ridiculous, but nothing's impossible and ridiculous if you have the right pieces in place."

=== Casting ===
Over 200 people auditioned for Cop Rock; Peter Onorati, who portrays Detective Vincent LaRusso, was introduced to the series by his wife after she talked with Howard McGillin, who had also auditioned. Jokingly stating that he had experience singing at weddings, Onorati's agent, Kay Liberman, set up an audition, where Onorati performed Fats Domino's "Blue Monday".

One of the only actors with singing experience, Teri Austin graduated with a Bachelor of Fine Arts and performed "Lover Man" and "Breaking Up Is Hard to Do" at her audition. Kathleen Wilhoite, who portrays Patricia Spence, had a record deal at the time, and decided to audition with "Easy to Be Hard", finding her casting as a "good gig for me, because singing is kind of my thing". McDaniel, on the other hand, turned down an offer to join the series but changed his mind after finding out it was created by Bochco, who he had worked with on the last season of Hill Street Blues.

Mick Murray was searching for an acting job in New York and was going through multiple pilots from ABC before hearing about Cop Rock and Bochco's involvement. At his audition, the casting director was Alexa Fogel, who was not of fan of his following a failed audition for the film Young Guns. As a result, Murray decided to perform a cappella by Terence Trent D'Arby, which Fogel responded to with "the warmest smile". At night, Murray received a phone call from his agent and was told that the production crew had expanded a small role for him so he could join as a series regular.

Larry Joshua brought his own guitar to his audition and performed "When She Wants Good Lovin'" and "Then You Can Tell Me Goodbye". During this time, David Gianopoulos heard about the series after running into Joshua near 42nd Street. Revealing to his agent that he had been secretly singing in several bands for over six years, Gianopoulos auditioned with Ben E. King's "Stand by Me" at Lincoln Center, where several other cast members also had their auditions. Originally, Gianopoulos had auditioned for the role of LaRusso before being told by Bochco to audition for the role of Officer Andy Campo. The following day, he performed Bruce Springsteen's "Hungry Heart" and received the part.

Ronny Cox was told by pilot director Gregory Hoblit that he would get the role of Chief Roger Kendrick whether or not he could sing. Broadway performer Anne Bobby, however, had to audition, doing so on a Saturday where she said she saw her friend Jane Krakowski. Furthermore, Paul McCrane was told by Hoblit and Bochco that they did not have a part for him at the moment and reassured him that they would write a new character once the show entered production; McCrane was later cast as Detective Bob McIntyre.

Several cast and guest stars had previously appeared on Hill Street Blues, including Bochco's wife Barbara Bosson (Fay Furillo on Blues, Mayor Plank on Cop Rock). Hill Street cast member Charles Haid was a producer and directed one episode. The seventh episode "Cop-a-Feeliac" opens with a roll call scene and musical number "Let's Be Careful Out There," based on the Hill Street Blues catchphrase. At the end of the scene, James B. Sikking makes a cameo appearance, uncredited and without dialogue, as his Hill Street Blues character Howard Hunter.

== Reception ==
On review aggregator Rotten Tomatoes, the series holds an approval rating of 53% based on 17 reviews, with an average rating of 5.33/10. The website's critical consensus states, "Cop Rock's ambition to innovate the police procedural is admirable, but the contrast of grit and glam proves too jarring with unmemorable music throwing the series' more promising dramatic beats askew." On Metacritic, it has a weighted average score of 61 out of 100, based on 15 critics, indicating "generally favorable reviews".

The show was a critical and commercial failure and was canceled by ABC after 11 episodes. The combination of a fusion of musical performances with serious police drama and dark humor with its high-powered production talent, made it infamous as one of the biggest television failures of the 1990s. TV Guide Magazine ranked it #8 on its List of the 50 Worst TV Shows of All Time list in 2002 and dubbed it "the single most bizarre TV musical of all time".

Despite an overwhelmingly negative reception and short run, the series has been rebroadcast in later years, with VH1 and A&E Network airing it on separate occasions later in the 1990s, and Trio in the 2000s.

== Home media ==
On May 17, 2016, Shout! Factory released the complete series on DVD in Region 1.

== Awards and nominations ==
Year	Award	Category	Recipient	Episode	Result
1991	Emmy Award	Outstanding Sound Mixing for a Drama Series	Robert Appere, Gary D. Rogers, Ron Estes, and Mark Server	"Oil Of Ol'Lay"	Nominated
1991	Emmy Award	Outstanding Directing in a Drama Series	Gregory Hoblit	Pilot	Nominated
1991	Emmy Award	Outstanding Achievement in Music and Lyrics	Ron Boustead and Greg Edmonson	"Oil Of Ol'Lay"	Nominated
1991	Emmy Award	Outstanding Editing for a Series – Single Camera Production	Joe Ann Fogle	Pilot	Won
1991	Emmy Award	Outstanding Achievement in Music and Lyrics	Randy Newman	Pilot	Won

== International broadcasts ==
In the United Kingdom, Cop Rock was televised on BBC1 and premiered on Monday September 30, 1991. The show premiered on Australian television via the Ten Network on Thursday, January 23, 1992, at 11:00 p.m.

== See also ==
- The Singing Detective
