= Jess Osuna =

American actor

- Osuna in Columbo, 1976
- Born: May 28, 1928; Oakland, California, U.S.
- Died: April 2, 2011 (aged 82); Greenwich Village, New York, U.S.
- Occupation: Actor
- Years active: 1956-2009

Jess Osuna (May 28, 1928 – April 2, 2011) was an American character actor whose credits included Three Days of the Condor and My Old Man. He also appeared in the films A New Leaf, Three Days of the Condor, All the President's Men, Taps and Kramer vs. Kramer, and the television programs Columbo, Kojak, NYPD and Hawk.

Osuna died at his home in Greenwich Village, Manhattan, on April 2, 2011, at the age of 82. He was buried at Calvary Cemetery in Woodside, Queens.
