= Rue McClanahan =

American actress (1934–2010)

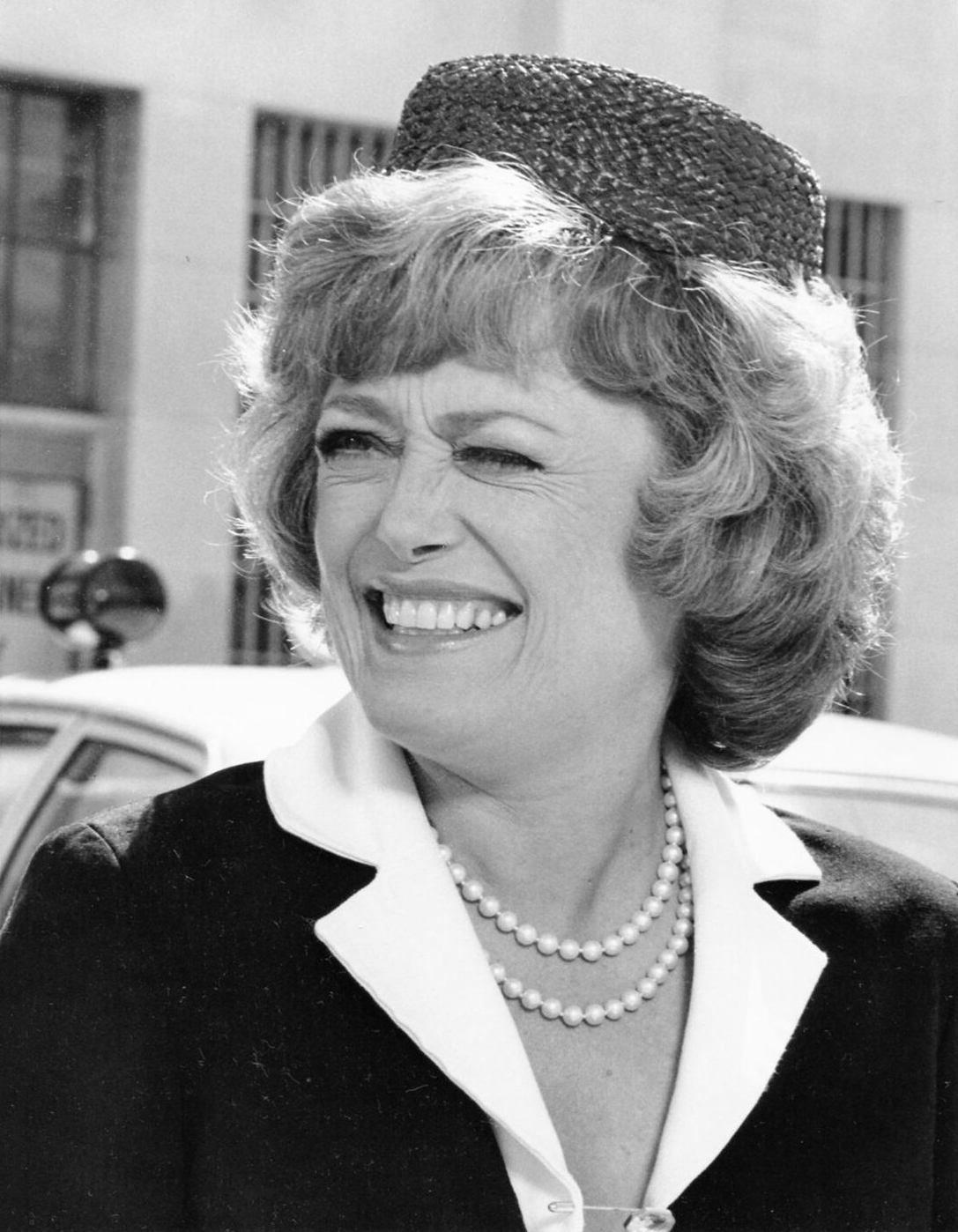
- McClanahan in a publicity portrait for The Joe Franklin Show, c. 1972
- Born: Eddi-Rue McClanahan; February 21, 1934; Healdton, Oklahoma, U.S.
- Died: June 3, 2010 (aged 76); New York City, U.S.
- Education: University of Tulsa (BA)
- Occupations: Actress; comedienne; author; fashion designer
- Years active: 1957–2010
- Television: Maude; Mama's Family; The Golden Girls; The Golden Palace
- Spouses: Tom Bish (m. 1958; div. 1959) Norman Hartweg (m. 1959; div. 1961) Peter DeMaio (m. 1964; div. 1971) Gus Fisher (m. 1976; div. 1981) Tom Keel (m. 1985; div. 1986) Morrow Wilson (m. 1997; sep. 2009)
- Children: 1
- Relatives: Amelia Kinkade (niece)
- Rue McClanahan's voice Rue McClanahan in the 2000s explaining the origin of her given name

Eddi-Rue McClanahan (February 21, 1934 – June 3, 2010) was an American actress, primarily known for her work in television sitcoms. She portrayed Vivian Harmon on Maude (1972–1978), Aunt Fran Crowley on Mama's Family (1983–1984), and Blanche Devereaux on both The Golden Girls (1985–1992) and its spin-off The Golden Palace (1992–1993).

For her performance as Blanche Devereaux, McClanahan received four Primetime Emmy Award nominations for Outstanding Lead Actress in a Comedy Series, winning the award in 1987. She was also nominated for three Golden Globe Awards for the same role.

In 2005, McClanahan appeared on Broadway as Madame Morrible in the musical Wicked.

== Early life ==
Eddi-Rue McClanahan was born in Healdton, Oklahoma, on February 21, 1934. She was the daughter of Dreda Rheua-Nell (née Medaris), a beautician, and William Edwin "Bill" McClanahan, a building contractor. Her name combined her father's middle name of "Edwin", to create Eddi, and her mother's middle name of "Rheua", to create Rue. She stopped using "Eddi" because it was mistaken for a male name, and once led to her accidentally receiving a conscription notice.

She was raised Methodist and was of Irish and Choctaw ancestry. Her Choctaw great-grandfather was named Running Hawk, according to her autobiography, My First Five Husbands... and the Ones Who Got Away (2007). Due to her father's work, her family moved frequently. She graduated from Ardmore High School in Ardmore, Oklahoma, where she acted in school plays and won the gold medal in oration. A National Honor Society member, McClanahan earned a Bachelor of Arts degree, cum laude, at the University of Tulsa, where she majored in both German and theater and joined the Kappa Alpha Theta sorority, serving as vice president.

== Career ==
A life member of the Actors Studio, McClanahan made her professional stage début at Pennsylvania's Erie Playhouse in 1957, in the play Inherit the Wind. She began acting off-Broadway in New York City in 1957, but did not make her Broadway début until 1969, when she portrayed Sally Weber in the original production of John Sebastian and Murray Schisgal's play with music, Jimmy Shine, with Dustin Hoffman in the title role.

Her role as Caroline Johnson on the television show Another World (from July 23, 1970 to September 20, 1971) brought her notice. Once her role on Another World ended, McClanahan joined the cast of the CBS soap opera Where the Heart Is, in which she played Margaret Jardin.

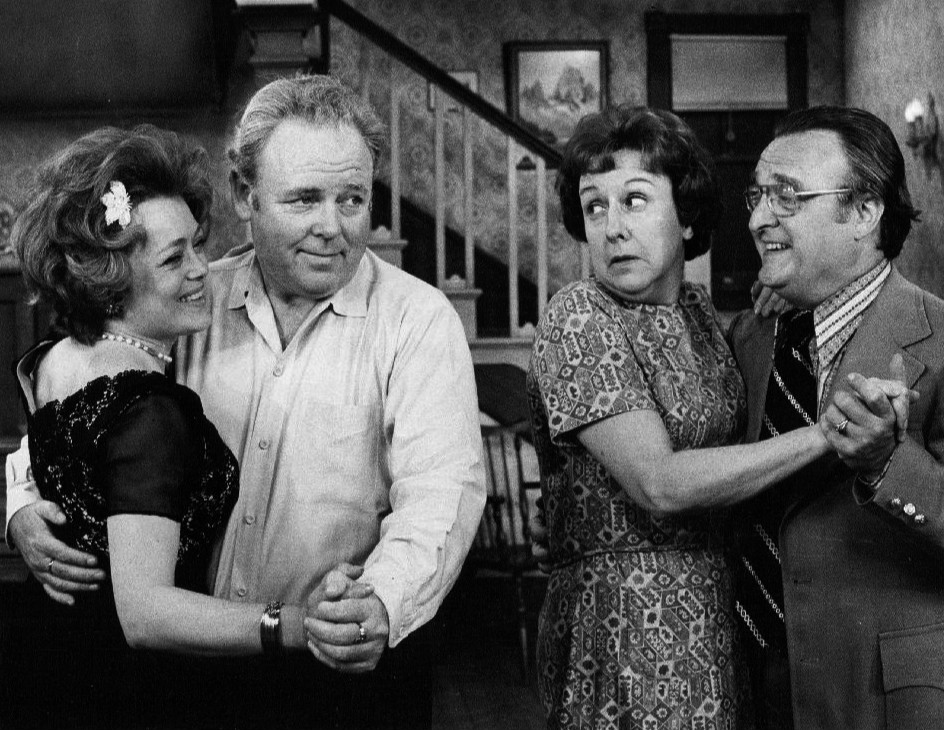
All In the Family. L-R: McClanahan, Carroll O'Connor, Jean Stapleton and Gardenia (1972)

In the 1972 episode of All in the Family "The Bunkers and the Swingers," McClanahan and Vincent Gardenia play a swinging couple who meet the unsuspecting Bunkers. McClanahan first worked with actress Bea Arthur on the sitcom Maude (1972–78). Arthur played Maude Findlay, and McClanahan played Maude's best friend Vivian Harmon, who was introduced as Vivian Cavender and eventually married Maude's next-door neighbor Dr. Arthur Harmon (played by Conrad Bain) after divorcing her first husband.

After Maude, McClanahan starred in Apple Pie, a series created for her by Norman Lear, but which aired only two episodes before it was canceled. In an interview, McClanahan said she also did another of the pilot episodes The Baxters for Lear, but told him she did not want to do the series itself. It is unknown if her appearance was in the actual pilot or an unaired pilot (presumably the latter, given she is not credited and the show is not attributed to her anywhere). It is also possible she never actually filmed the episode, but was only considering it. Many years later, a script binder entitled The Baxters was discovered to be a part of her collection.

On the first two seasons of Mama's Family (1983–84), McClanahan portrayed Aunt Fran Crowley, an uptight spinster sister to Mama Thelma Harper (Vicki Lawrence). Fran was a journalist for the local paper. Also in the cast was McClanahan's future Golden Girls costar Betty White. McClanahan and White appeared before the show was canceled by NBC after two seasons and then retooled for first run syndication.

On The Golden Girls (1985–92) and its short-lived spin-off The Golden Palace (1992–93), McClanahan portrayed man-crazed Southern belle Blanche Devereaux, owner of the house she lived in and rented out to her three roommates and best friends: Dorothy Zbornak (Arthur), Rose Nylund (White), and Dorothy's mother, Sophia Petrillo (Estelle Getty). McClanahan received four Emmy Award nominations for Outstanding Lead Actress in a Comedy Series for her work on the show, winning the award in 1987.

She appeared as a leader of Al-Anon in a 1970s informational film called Slight Drinking Problem, in which Patty Duke played the enabling and eventually self-empowered wife of an alcoholic. In feature films, she appeared in The Rotten Apple (1961) and Walk the Angry Beach (1968). She appeared in the Walter Matthau-Jack Lemmon comedy Out to Sea (1997).

On television, she appeared as Matilda Joslyn Gage, mother-in-law of L. Frank Baum in the made-for-television movie The Dreamer of Oz (1990). She also made guest appearances on game shows including The $10,000 Pyramid, Hollywood Squares, and Tattletales. She made guest appearances on Murder, She Wrote, Charles in Charge and Newhart. In the early 1990s, McClanahan appeared as Margaret Becker in a trilogy of made-for-television films: Children of the Bride, Baby of the Bride, and Mother of the Bride. She voice-acted in cartoons, voicing Scarlett the horse in the 1997 Fox Christmas special Annabelle's Wish. She played the role of Steve's grandmother in the Blue's Clues video Blue's Big Treasure Hunt (1999). On Spider-Man: The Animated Series, she appeared in the 1994 episode "Doctor Octopus: Armed And Dangerous" as Anastasia Hardy. She played a biology teacher in 1997's Starship Troopers. She voiced the role of Bunny in a 2007 episode of King of the Hill, "Hair Today, Gone Today." In 2009, she appeared in an episode of Law & Order as a woman who had an affair with John F. Kennedy.

On Broadway, McClanahan appeared in the all-woman cast of The Women in 2001–2002, alongside Cynthia Nixon and Jennifer Coolidge, among others. She replaced Tammy Grimes as "The Visitor from New York" (Hannah Warren) in the Neil Simon comedy California Suite from April 4, 1977, until the show closed on July 2 of that same year.

In 2003, she appeared alongside Mark Hamill in the two-hander Six Dance Lessons in Six Weeks at the Coconut Grove Playhouse in Miami, Florida. She chose not to continue with the production and was replaced by Polly Bergen for the Broadway performances. The same year, she appeared in the musical romantic comedy film The Fighting Temptations as Nancy Stringer, which costarred Cuba Gooding, Jr., Beyoncé Knowles, Mike Epps, and Steve Harvey. On Broadway, she replaced Carole Shelley as Madame Morrible in the musical Wicked on May 31, 2005. She played the role for eight months until January 8, 2006. She was replaced by Carol Kane on January 10, 2006.

Her autobiography, My First Five Husbands ... and the Ones Who Got Away, was released in 2007. In June 2008, The Golden Girls was awarded the Pop Culture award at the Sixth Annual TV Land Awards; McClanahan accepted the award with co-stars Arthur and White. McClanahan's final acting role was as Peggy Ingram in the cable series Sordid Lives on the Logo network, which premiered July 23, 2008.

== Activism ==
An animal rights advocate and vegetarian, McClanahan was one of the first celebrity supporters of People for the Ethical Treatment of Animals. She supported Alley Cat Allies, a nonprofit advocacy organization dedicated to transforming communities to protect and improve the lives of cats, and appeared in a public service announcement for the organization in early 2010.

McClanahan was a supporter of gay rights, including advocating for same-sex marriage in the United States. In January 2009, she appeared in the star-studded Defying Inequality: The Broadway Concert—A Celebrity Benefit for Equal Rights.

== Personal life and death ==
McClanahan was married six times and had a son, Mark Bish, born in 1958, from her first marriage to Tom Bish. Her fourth husband, Gus Fisher, who appeared alongside her on the television game show Tattletales in 1976, died on February 22, 2004.

McClanahan lived in the Encino and Studio City neighborhoods of Los Angeles for several years before moving to New York City in 1994, where she would live for the rest of her life.

In June 1997, McClanahan was diagnosed with breast cancer, for which she was treated successfully.

On November 4, 2009, McClanahan underwent triple bypass surgery after being hospitalized for cardiac-related symptoms. An event scheduled for November 14, 2009, to honor her lifetime achievements, Golden: A Gala Tribute to Rue McClanahan, at the Castro Theatre in San Francisco, California, had to be postponed. On January 14, 2010, Entertainment Tonight reported that while recovering from surgery, the actress suffered a minor stroke. In March 2010, fellow Golden Girls cast member Betty White reported on The Ellen DeGeneres Show that McClanahan was doing well and that her speech had returned to normal.

McClanahan died on June 3, 2010, at age 76, at NewYork–Presbyterian Hospital after she suffered a brain hemorrhage. White told Entertainment Tonight that McClanahan was a "close and dear friend."

McClanahan was survived by her sixth husband, Morrow Wilson (from whom she separated in 2009); her son from her first marriage, Mark Bish (of Austin, Texas); her sister, Melinda Lou McClanahan (of Silver City, New Mexico); and other family, including her niece, actress and author Amelia Kinkade.

No funeral service was held for McClanahan; her family created an official memorial page on Facebook, and memorial services were held during the summer of 2010 in New York and Los Angeles. On June 10, 2010, her New York apartment went on the market for an asking price of $2.25 million.

In February 2017, a Golden Girls–themed eatery named Rue La Rue Cafe, owned by McClanahan's close friend Michael La Rue (who inherited many of the star's personal belongings and in turn decorated the restaurant with them), opened in the Washington Heights section of the New York City borough of Manhattan. However, after less than a year in business, the cafe closed in November 2017.

== Awards and nominations ==
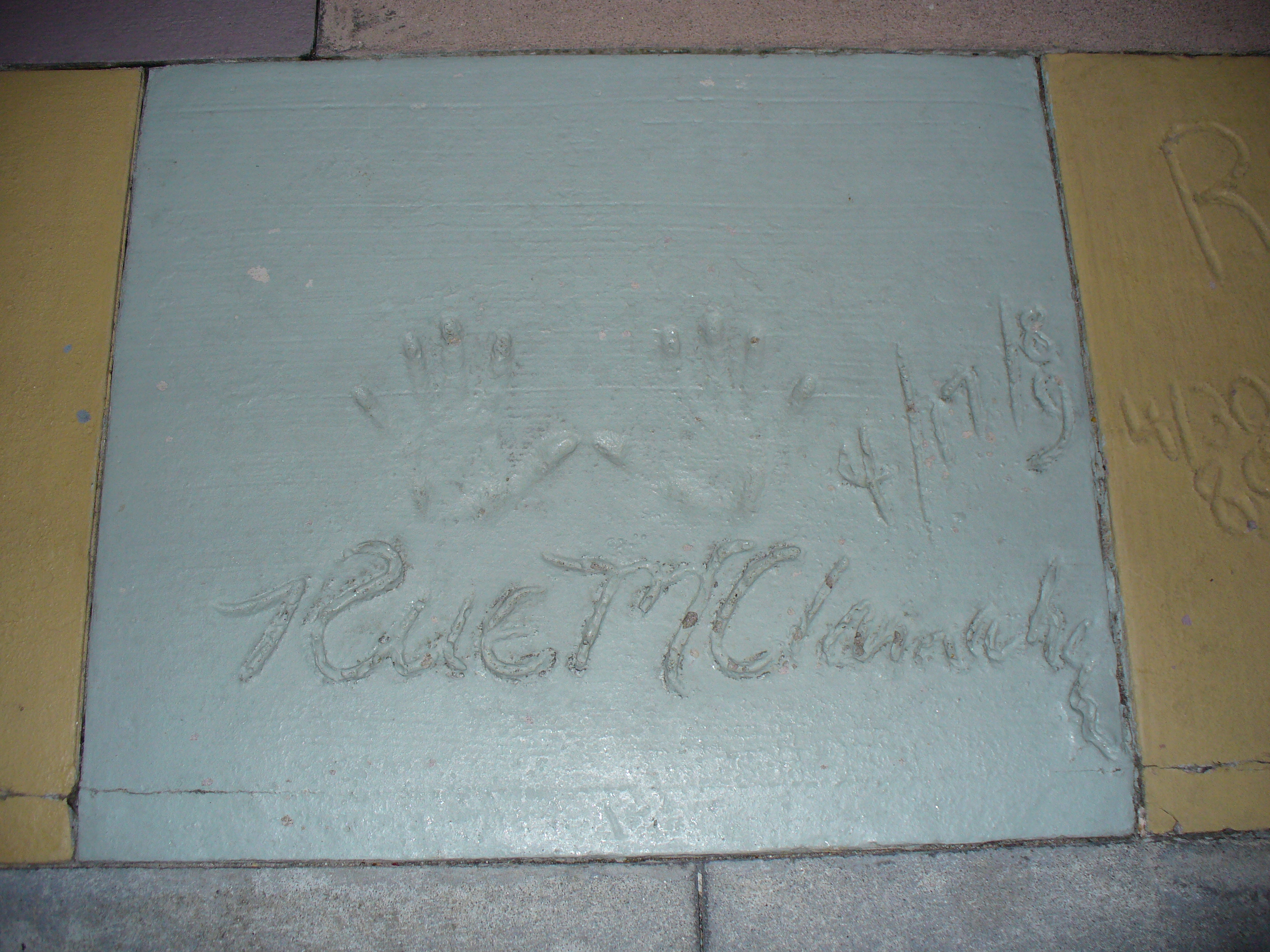
The handprints of Rue McClanahan in front of The Great Movie Ride at Walt Disney World's Disney's Hollywood Studios theme park, 2007

Year	Award	Nominated work	Result
1969	Obie Award for Best Actress	Who's Happy Now	Won
1986	Golden Globe Award for Best Actress in a Comedy Series	The Golden Girls	Nominated
1986	Emmy Award for Outstanding Lead Actress in a Comedy Series	The Golden Girls	Nominated
1986	Golden Apple Award for Female Star of the Year	The Golden Girls	Won
1987	Golden Globe Award for Best Actress in a Comedy Series	The Golden Girls	Nominated
1987	Emmy Award for Outstanding Lead Actress in a Comedy Series	The Golden Girls	Won
1988	Golden Globe Award for Best Actress in a Comedy Series	The Golden Girls	Nominated
1988	Emmy Award for Outstanding Lead Actress in a Comedy Series	The Golden Girls	Nominated
1989	Emmy Award for Outstanding Lead Actress in a Comedy Series	The Golden Girls	Nominated
2003	TV Land Award for Quintessential Non-traditional Family	The Golden Girls	Won
2008	TV Land Pop Culture Award	The Golden Girls	Won

== Filmography ==
=== Film ===
Year	Title	Role	Notes
1961	The Grass Eater	Loraina	
1961	Five Minutes to Live	Pamela	Uncredited
1963	Five Minutes to Love	Sally "Poochie"	Alternate titles: The Rotten Apple / It Only Takes Five Minutes
1964	How to Succeed with Girls	Lorena	
1965	Angel's Flight	Dolly	Credited as Rhue McClanahan. Alternate title: Shock Hill
1968	Walk the Angry Beach	Sandy	Alternate titles: Hollywood After Dark / The Unholy Choice
1970	The People Next Door	Della	
1971	The Pursuit of Happiness	Mrs. O'Mara	
1971	They Might Be Giants	Daisy	
1971	Some of My Best Friends Are...	Lita Joyce	
1973	Blade	Gail	
1978	Having Babies III	Gloria Miles	Television movie
1978	Sergeant Matlovich vs. the U.S. Air Force	Mat's Mother	Television movie
1978	Rainbow	Ida Koverman	Television movie
1979	Topper	Clara Topper	Television movie
1980	The Great American Traffic Jam	Adele Sherman	Television movie
1981	World of Honor	Maggie McNeill	Television movie
1982	The Day the Bubble Burst	Barbara Arvey	Television movie
1986	Picnic	Flo Owens	Television movie
1987	Little Match Girl	Frances Dutton	Television movie
1988	Liberace	Frances Liberace	Television movie
1988	Take My Daughters, Please	Lilah Page	Television movie
1989	The Man in the Brown Suit	Suzy Blair	Television movie
1989	The Wickedest Witch	Avarissa	Television special
1990	Modern Love	Mrs. Evelyn Parker	
1990	The Earth Day Special	Blanche Devereaux	Television special
1990	After the Shock	Sherra Cox	Television movie
1990	Children of the Bride	Margret Becker	Television movie
1990	To My Daughter	Laura Carlson	T movie
1990	The Dreamer of Oz: The L. Frank Baum Story	Matilda Electa Joslyn Gage	Television movie
1991	Baby of the Bride	Margret Becker-Hix	Television movie
1993	Mother of the Bride	Margret Becker-Hix	Television movie
1993	Message from Nam	Beatrice Andrews	Television miniseries
1993	Nunsense	Reverend Mother Regina	Television movie
1994	A Burning Passion: The Margaret Mitchell Story	Grandma Stephens	Television movie
1994	Nunsense 2: The Sequel	Reverend Mother Regina	Television movie
1995	A Holiday to Remember	Miz Leona	Television movie
1996	Innocent Victims	Marylou Hennis	Television miniseries
1996	Dear God	Mom Rue Turner	
1997	This World, Then the Fireworks	Mrs. Tessa Lakewood	
1997	Out to Sea	Ellen Carruthers	
1997	Annabelle's Wish	Scarlett (voice)	Television movie
1997	Starship Troopers	Ruth the Biology Teacher	
1998	Border to Border	Mrs. Eda Kirby	
1998	Rusty: A Dog's Tale	Edna Callahan	Alternate title: Rusty: The Great Rescue
1998	Nunsense 3: The Jamboree	Reverend Mother Regina	Television movie
1999	A Saintly Switch	Aunt Fanny	Television movie
2000	The Moving of Sophia Myles	Mary-Margaret	Television movie
2001	Nuncrackers: The Nunsense Christmas Musical	Reverend Mother Regina	Direct-to-video
2003	Miracle Dogs	Katherine Mannion	Television movie
2003	The Fighting Temptations	Nancy Stringer	
2005	Wit's End	Dean Madison	
2005	Back to You and Me	Helen Ludwick	Television movie
2008	Generation Gap	Kay	Television movie

=== Television ===
Year	Title	Role	Notes
1961	The Aquanauts	—N/a	Episode: "The Double Adventure"
1964	Burke's Law	Waitress	Episode: "Who Killed April?"
1970–71	Another World	Caroline Johnson	Unknown episodes
1971	Love of Life	Mrs. Baylee	Unknown episodes
1971–72	Where the Heart Is	Margaret Jardin #2	Unknown episodes
1971	Great Performances	Josef Finn	Episode: "Hogan's Goat"
1972	All in the Family	Ruth Rempley	Episode: "The Bunkers and the Swingers"
1972–78	Maude	Vivian Cavender Harmon	101 episodes
1972	Great Performances	Cora	Episode: "The Rimers of Eldrich"
1973	The ABC Afternoon Playbreak	Carol Babcock	Episode: "My Secret Mother"
1974	Mannix	Gloria	Episode: "Game Plan"
1975	Great Performances	Faye Precious	Episode: "Who's Happy Now"
1978	Apple Pie	Ginger-Nell Hollyhock	8 episodes
1978	Grandpa Goes to Washington	Grace	Episode: "Pilot"
1978–84	The Love Boat	Various Characters	6 episodes
1979	$weepstake$		Episode: "Vince, Pete and Patsy, Jessica and Rodney"
1979	Supertrain	Janet	Episode: "Where Have You Been Billy Boy"
1979	Fantasy Island	Margaret Fielding	Episode: "Bowling/Command Performance"
1980	Lou Grant	Maggie McKenna	Episode: "Guns"
1980	Here's Boomer	Thelma	Episode: "Private Eye"
1981	Gimme a Break!	Marian Grover	Episode: "The Second Time Around"
1981	Darkroom	Mrs. Louise Michaelson	Episode: "Daisies"
1982	Trapper John, M.D.	Mary Renquist	Episode: "John's Other Life"
1982	Fantasy Island	Gertie	Episode: "Dancing Lady/The Final Round"
1983	Newhart	Eleanor Smathers	Episode: "The Way We Thought We Were"
1983	American Playhouse	Fortune Teller	Episode: "The Skin of Our Teeth"
1983	Small & Frye	Miss Parsifal	Episode: "Pilot"
1983–84	Mama's Family	Aunt Fran Crowley	24 episodes
1984	Gimme a Break!	Katrina	Episode: "Grandpa's Secret Life"
1984	Alice	Mother Goose	Episode: "Big Bad Mel"
1984–85	Charles in Charge	Irene Pembroke	2 episodes
1985	Cover Up	Mattie Bernstein	Episode: "Murder in Malibu"
1985	Crazy Like a Fox	Angie	Episode: "Turn Off the Century Fox"
1985	Murder, She Wrote	Miriam Redford	Episode: "Murder Takes the Bus"
1985–92	The Golden Girls	Blanche Devereaux	180 episodes
1988	Empty Nest	Blanche Devereaux	Episode: "Fatal Attraction"
1989	Nightmare Classics	Madam	Episode: "The Strange Case of Dr. Jekyll and Mr. Hyde"
1992	Nurses	Blanche Devereaux	Episode: "Moon Over Miami"
1992–93	The Golden Palace	Blanche Devereaux	24 episodes
1993	Boy Meets World	Bernice Matthews	Episode: "Grandma Was a Rolling Stone"
1994	Burke's Law	Jinxy Duke	Episode: "Who Killed the Host at the Roast?"
1994	Touched by an Angel	Amelia Bowthorpe Archinald	Episode: "Manny"
1994	Spider-Man	Mrs. Hardy	Episode: "Dr. Octopus: Armed and Dangerous"
1995	The Mommies	Amanda Kellogg	Episode: "The Mother of All In-Laws"
1997	Promised Land	Valerie Carter	Episode: "Intolerance"
1997	Murphy Brown	Virginia Redfeld	Episode: "Mama Miller"
1998	Columbo	Verity Chandler	Episode: "Ashes to Ashes"
1998	Love Boat: The Next Wave	Abigail Jordan	Episode: "Captains Courageous"
1999	Safe Harbor	Grandma Loring	11 episodes
1999	Blue's Clues	Steve's Grandma	Episode: "Blue's Big Treasure Hunt"
1999	The Lot	Priscilla Tremaine	1 episode
2000	Ladies Man	Aunt Lou	2 episodes
2000	Intimate Portrait	Herself	Episode: "Rue McClanahan"
2001	Touched by an Angel	Lila Winslow	Episode: "Shallow Water" (Parts 1 & 2)
2002	Stage on Screen	Countess de Lage	Episode: "The Women"
2003	The Golden Girls: Their Greatest Moments	Herself (co-host)	Television special
2004	Whoopi	Marion	Episode: "American Woman"
2004	Wonderfalls	Millie Marcus	Episode: "Barrel Bear"
2005	Hope & Faith	Sylvia	Episode: "O, Sister, Where Art Thou?"
2007	King of the Hill	Bunny	Episode: "Hair Today, Gone Today"
2008	Sordid Lives: The Series	Peggy Ingram	13 episodes
2009	Law & Order	Lois McIntyre	Episode: "Illegitimate"
2009	Meet the Browns	Lorraine	Episode: "Meet Mr. Wrong" (final role)

=== Stage ===
Year	Title	Role	Notes
1957	Inherit the Wind	Rachel Brown	Erie Playhouse, Pennsylvania
1964	The Secret Life of Walter Mitty	Hazel	The Players Theatre, Off-Broadway
1966	The Best Laid Plains	Alicia Hopper/Lorna (Standby)	Brooks Atkinson Theatre, Broadway
1968	Jimmy Shine	Brooks Atkinson Theatre, Broadway	
1971	Father's Day	Louise/Marian (Standby)	John Golden Theatre, Broadway
1972	Sticks and Bones	Harriet (Replacement)	John Golden Theatre, Broadway
1976	California Suite	Diana Nichols/Gert Franklyn/Hannah Warren (Replacement)	Eugene O'Neill Theatre, Broadway
1994	Annie	Miss Hannigan	Starlight Theater, Kansas City
1995	After-Play	Terry Guteman	Manhattan Theatre Club, Off-Broadway
2001	The Women	Countess de Lage	American Airlines Theatre, Broadway
2003	Six Dance Lessons in Six Weeks	Lily Harrison	Coconut Grove Playhouse, Miami
2005	Wicked	Madame Morrible (Replacement)	Gershwin Theatre, Broadway

== Book ==
- McClanahan, Rue (2007). My First Five Husbands...And the Ones Who Got Away. New York: Crown Archetype. ISBN 978-0-7679-2676-8.
