= Anne Bobby =

American actress (born 1967)

- Born: Anne Marie Bobby; December 12, 1967 (age 58); Paterson, New Jersey
- Occupations: Actress, voice actress, playwright, author
- Years active: 1985–present

Anne Marie Bobby (born December 12, 1967) is an American actress, voice actress, playwright and author, best known for her role as Lori Winston, the heroine in Clive Barker's Nightbreed and Brigid Tenenbaum in the BioShock series. She was praised by The Washington Post for her portrayal of Tallasse in What the Deaf Man Heard (1997). The Los Angeles Times called Bobby's Tallasse "a sensitive, insightful portrayal."

Bobby also played a police officer in Cop Rock and in 2016, the New York Times compared her performance in, "Why Can't a Man Be More Like a Woman?" to a Broadway performance. In another musical, Groundhog, Bobby was praised for her duets and solos.

She attended NYU, where she studied Anthropology and Classics.

== Selected film, television and other credits ==
Film
Year	Title	Role
1989	Born on the Fourth of July	Suzanne Kovic
1990	Nightbreed	Lori Winston
1991	Baby of the Bride	Anne
1996	Beautiful Girls	Sarah Morris
1998	Happiness	Rhonda
1998	Finding North	Debi
2014	The Hanover House	Martha Hobson

Theater
1986-7	Smile	Robin Gibson
1992	Groundhog	
1993	Black Comedy	Carol Melkett
1994	Merrily We Roll Along	Beth
2000	Strictly Personal	Lori
2008	All the Rage	Helen

Television
Year	Title	Role	Notes
1990	Cop Rock	Officer Vicky Quinn	Regular
1990	Children of the Bride	Anne	TV film
1995	Mad about You	Susannah	Recurring
1997	What the Deaf Man Heard	Tallasse	TV film
2004	As the World Turns	Greta Williams - Social Worker	Recurring Role

Video games
Year	Title	Role	Notes
2007	BioShock	Brigid Tenenbaum	
2010	BioShock 2	Brigid Tenenbaum	
2010	BioShock 2: Minerva's Den	Brigid Tenenbaum	
2014	BioShock Infinite: Burial at Sea	"Sex Without Compromise" video narrator	Episode Two
2017	Perception	Felicia Briar, Betty Martin, Susannah Mortin	
2018	Red Dead Redemption 2	The Local Pedestrian Population	
