= Jonathan Kahn =

American lawyer and author of books relating to race

Jonathan Kahn is a professor of Law and Biology at Northeastern University. He was formerly Professor of law at Mitchell Hamline School of Law and James E. Kelley Chair in Tort Law. He is the author of Race on the Brain: What Implicit Bias Gets Wrong About the Struggle for Racial Justice (2017) and Race in a Bottle: The Story of BiDil and Racialized Medicine in a Post-Genomic Age (2013).

== Selected publications ==
- Kahn, Jonathan (Summer 2001). "What's in a Name? Law's Identity Under the Tort of Appropriation". Temple Law Review. 74 (2): 263–298. SSRN 1950309.
- Kahn, Jonathan (1996). "Enslaving the Image: The Origins of the Tort of Appropriation of Identity Reconsidered". Legal Theory. 2 (4): 301–324. doi:10.1017/S1352325200000550. ISSN 1469-8048. S2CID 144284314.
