= Kristy McNichol =

American actress (born 1962)

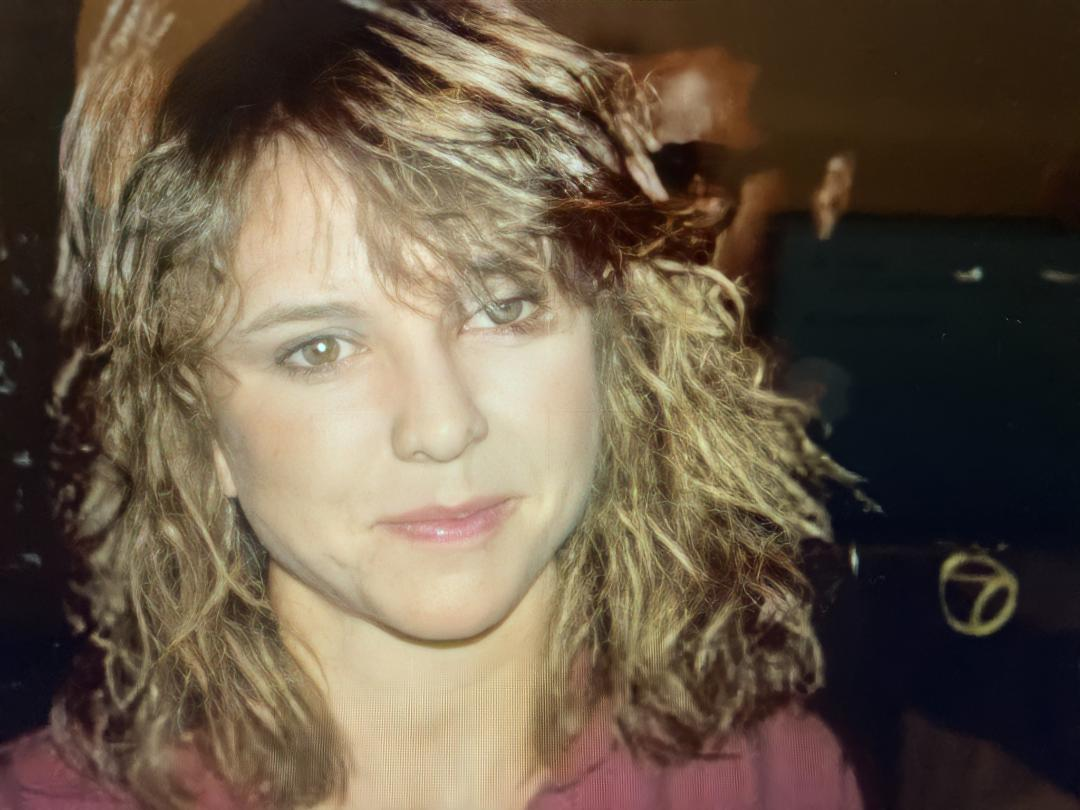
- McNichol in 1991
- Born: Christina Ann McNichol; September 11, 1962 (age 64); Los Angeles, California, U.S.
- Occupation: Actress
- Years active: 1970–2001
- Known for: Family; Little Darlings; White Dog; Only When I Laugh; Empty Nest
- Partner: Martie Allen
- Relatives: Jimmy McNichol (brother); Kellee Maize (niece)

Christina Ann "Kristy" McNichol (born September 11, 1962) is an American former actress. Beginning her career as a child actress, she rose to fame in 1976 with her role as the teenage daughter Letitia "Buddy" Lawrence in the TV drama Family for which she won two Emmy Awards. Subsequent roles included Angel in the film Little Darlings, Polly in Only When I Laugh, and Barbara Weston in the TV sitcom Empty Nest. McNichol retired from acting in 2001.

== Career ==
McNichol appeared with her brother Jimmy McNichol in commercials and later, on her own, in guest appearances on such other series as Starsky & Hutch, The Bionic Woman, CHiPs, Love, American Style, and The Love Boat, thanks to family friend Desi Arnaz. Her first stint as a series regular came in the role of Patricia Apple in the short-lived television series Apple's Way (1974).

In 1976, McNichol was cast as Letitia "Buddy" Lawrence in the television drama series Family (1976–80). She was nominated for the Emmy Award for Best Supporting Actress in a Dramatic Series three years in a row (1977–79), winning in 1977 and 1979. In 1980, she was nominated for the Emmy Award for Outstanding Lead Actress in a Drama Series for Family. The role featured her skateboarding, making her an early skateboard hero to many people. She competed against Dan Haggerty in 1977 in skateboarding in Celebrity Challenge of the Sexes.

In 1977, McNichol appeared in the TV special The Carpenters at Christmas, performing several musical numbers with the duo. In 1978, she and Jimmy made their foray into music, recording the album Kristy and Jimmy McNichol for RCA Records (AFL1-2875). Produced by Phil Margo and Mitch Margo, it included the singles "He's So Fine" (a cover of The Chiffons' 1963 hit), which peaked at number 70 on the Billboard chart and "Page by Page". The McNichols promoted the album at New York's Studio 54 discothèque with other celebrities. In 1978, McNichol performed with Jimmy in a second Carpenters' holiday special, titled The Carpenters: A Christmas Portrait.

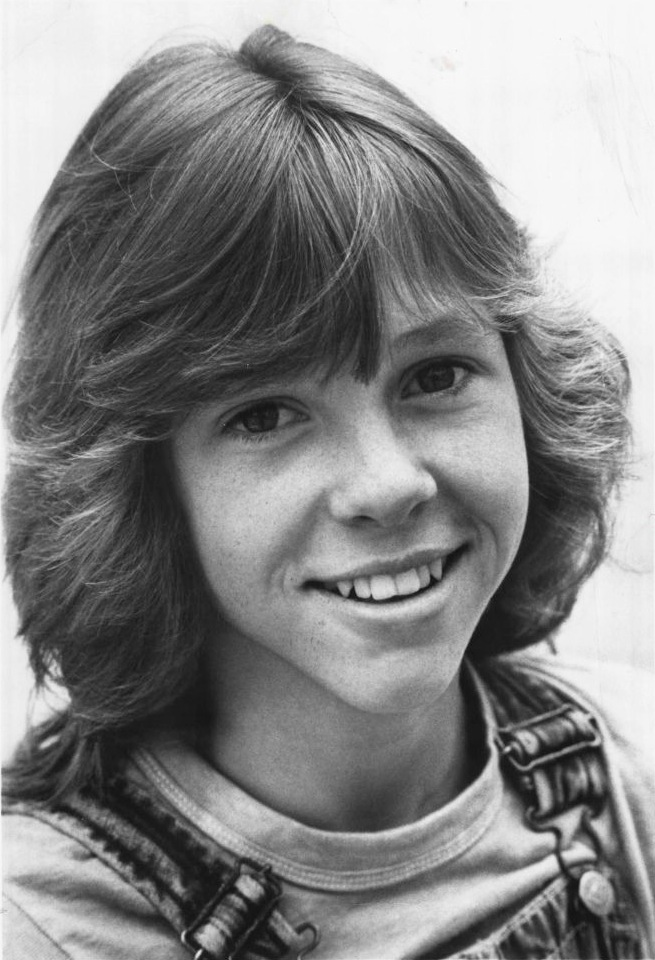
Publicity photo of child actress Kristy McNichol (age 13) promoting the September 28, 1976, premiere of the second season of the ABC television series Family.

McNichol was one of the bigger teen stars of that era. She appeared on talk shows such as The Mike Douglas Show and Dinah!, and made several appearances on Battle of the Network Stars and other celebrity-based sports shows. In 1978, she starred in the acclaimed TV movie Summer of My German Soldier.

McNichol began her film career in 1977 in Black Sunday, but her scenes were cut. In 1978, she starred with Burt Reynolds and Sally Field in the black comedy The End.

In 1980, McNichol played one of the leading roles in the hit coming-of-age movie Little Darlings, which also starred Tatum O'Neal, with Matt Dillon and Cynthia Nixon in supporting roles. Her performance was acclaimed by many reviewers, including those who disliked the film. Later in 1980, she appeared with Dennis Quaid and Mark Hamill in the film The Night the Lights Went Out in Georgia. In 1981, she co-starred in Neil Simon's Only When I Laugh and was nominated for a Golden Globe Award for Best Supporting Actress. The film is a revised version of the Neil Simon play "The Gingerbread Lady". She also appeared in the movie "White Dog" in the same time period.

McNichol was nominated for a Golden Raspberry Award for Worst Actress for her performance in the 1982 film The Pirate Movie. The same year, she suffered an emotional breakdown while playing the lead role in the comedy-drama Just the Way You Are that was being filmed in France. She later told People magazine that she could not sleep and she cried the entire time she was in France. She had nightmares when she did sleep and she cried on set. She did not return to the production after Christmas to finish the movie; filming had to be interrupted for a year while McNichol recovered. She later said that the breakdown had been caused by the pressures of her career, as well as the pressure to hide her sexuality from the public.

In 1986, McNichol appeared in Women of Valor, a TV movie about American nurses in a World War II Japanese POW camp. She made two theatrical films in 1988: You Can't Hurry Love; and Two Moon Junction.

In the same year, McNichol began the role of Barbara Weston on the television sitcom Empty Nest, a spin-off of The Golden Girls. The show ran for seven seasons but McNichol left the series in 1992, midway through season five, after being diagnosed with bipolar disorder. She returned for the show's final episode in 1995. It was her last on-screen performance. However, she later voiced characters in the animated TV series Extreme Ghostbusters (1997) and Invasion America (1998).

In June 2001, McNichol announced that she had retired from acting. Her publicist released this statement:

A lot of people have wondered what I've been up to. I retired from my career after 24 years. My feeling was that it was time to play my biggest part – myself! I must say that it has been the best thing that ever happened to me. So many fans are disappointed that I'm not currently acting; however, some may not realize that the process I'm in at this time is necessary and vital for my personal happiness and well-being.

== Personal life ==
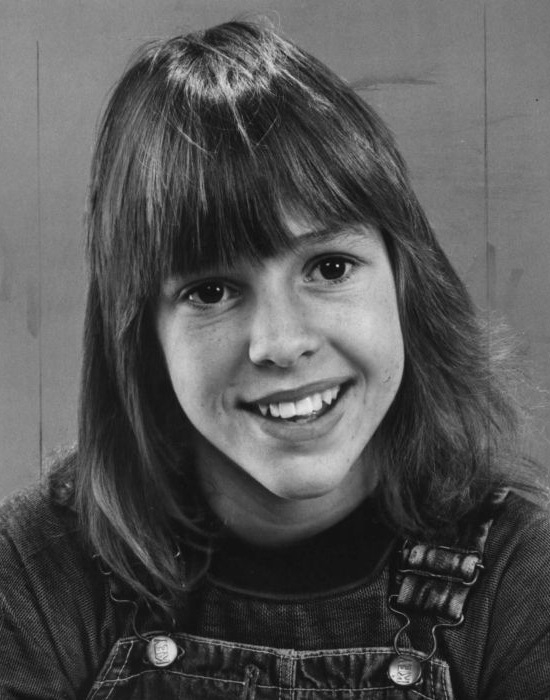
McNichol at age 13 in 1976

McNichol was born on September 11, 1962, in Los Angeles, California, the daughter of James and Carolyn McNichol. Her father was a carpenter and her mother worked as a registered nurse. McNichol has Scottish/Irish ancestry on her father's side and her mother is of Lebanese Christian descent. After her retirement, McNichol taught acting at a private school in Los Angeles and devoted much of her time to charity work.

In 2012, McNichol shared that she is a lesbian and has lived with her partner Martie Allen since the early 1990s. She made the statement in hopes that her openness would help young people who are bullied because of their sexual orientation. In the same statement, McNichol made it clear that she had no plans to return to acting.

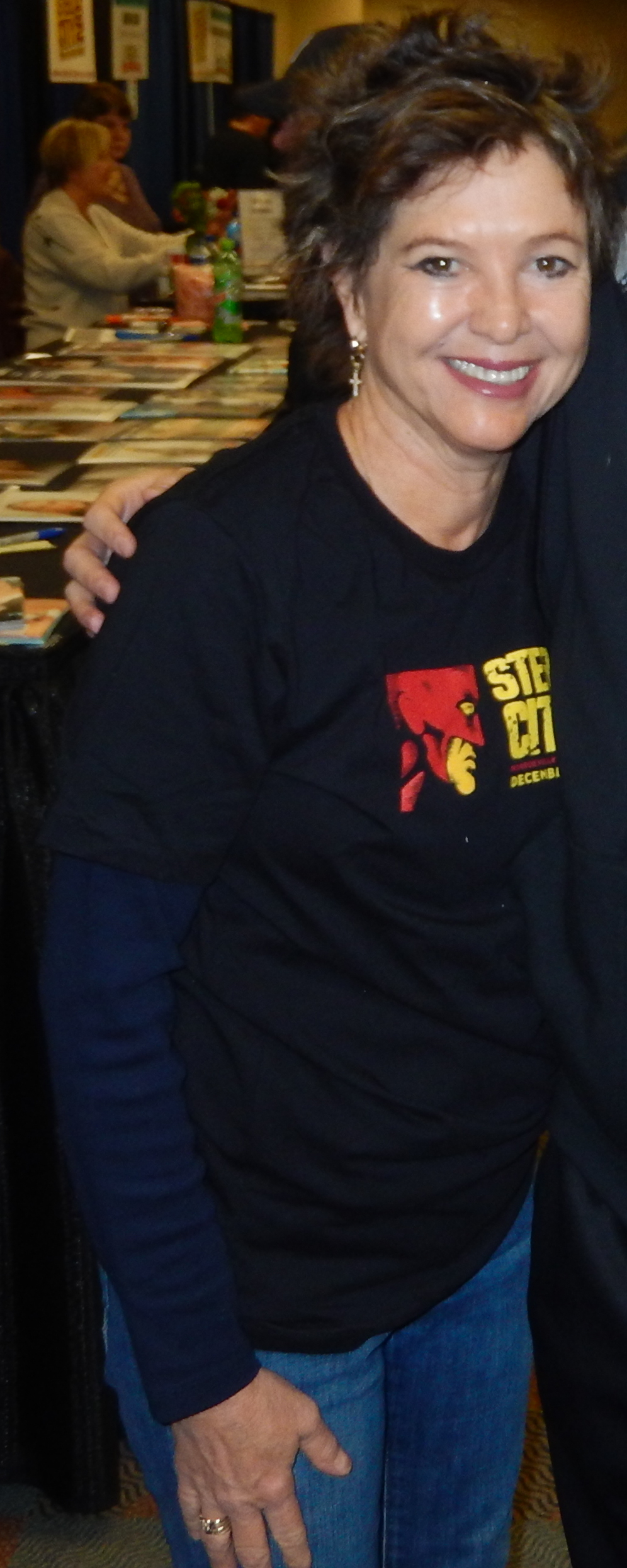
McNichol (2009; age 46)

== Filmography ==
=== Film ===
Year	Title	Role	Notes
1978	The End	Julie Lawson	
1978	Like Mom, Like Me	Jennifer Gruen	Television movie
1978	Summer of My German Soldier	Patty Bergen	Television movie
1979	My Old Man	Jo Butler	Television movie
1980	Little Darlings	Angel Bright	
1980	Blinded by the Light	Janet Bowers	Television movie
1981	The Night the Lights Went Out in Georgia	Amanda Child	
1981	Only When I Laugh	Polly	Nominated—Golden Globe Award for Best Supporting Actress – Motion Picture
1982	White Dog	Julie Sawyer	Unreleased in the United States
1982	The Pirate Movie	Mabel Stanley	
1982	Aladdin and the Magic Lamp	The Princess	Voice
1984	Just the Way You Are	Susan Berlanger	
1985	Love, Mary	Mary Groda-Lewis	Television movie
1986	Dream Lover	Kathy Gardner	
1986	Women of Valor	T.J. Nolan	Television movie
1988	You Can't Hurry Love	Rhonda	
1988	Two Moon Junction	Patti Jean	
1989	The Forgotten One	Barbara Stupple	
1990	Children of the Bride	Mary	Television movie
1991	Baby of the Bride	Mary	Television movie
1993	Mother of the Bride	Mary	Television movie

=== Television ===
Year	Title	Role	Notes
1973	Love, American Style	Steffi	Episode: "Love and the Unsteady Steady"
1974–1975	Apple's Way	Patricia Apple	15 episodes
1975	ABC Afterschool Special	Jenna McPhail	Episode: "Fawn Story"
1976	ABC Afterschool Special	Nina Beckwith	Episode: "Me & Dad's New Wife"
1976	Sara	Unknown	Episode: "Grandpa's Girl"
1976	The Bionic Woman	Amanda Cory	Episode: "The Ghost Hunter"
1976	Starsky & Hutch	Meg	Episode: "The Hostages"
1976	Starsky & Hutch	Molly Edwards	Episode: "Little Girl Lost"
1976–1980	Family	Letitia "Buddy" Lawrence	86 episodes Primetime Emmy Award for Outstanding Supporting Actress in a Drama Series (1977, 1979); Nominated—Golden Globe Award for Best Actress – Television Series Drama; Nominated—Primetime Emmy Award for Outstanding Lead Actress in a Drama Series; Nominated—Primetime Emmy Award for Outstanding Supporting Actress in a Drama Series
1977	The Love Boat	Linda Morley	Pilot
1977	The Love Boat	Kelly	Episode: "Graham and Kelly"
1977	ABC Afterschool Special	Carlie Higgins	Episode: "The Pinballs"
1978	Starsky & Hutch	Joey Carston	Episode: "The Trap"
1988	Murder, She Wrote	Jill Morton	Episode: "Showdown in Saskatchewan"
1988–1992, 1995	Empty Nest	Barbara Weston	100 episodes
1991–1992	The Golden Girls	Barbara Weston	Episodes: "Witness", "A Midwinter Night's Dream"
1997	Extreme Ghostbusters	Girl in Sub	Voice; episode: "Dry Spell"
1998	Invasion America	Sgt. Angela "Angie" Romar	13 episodes

== Awards ==
=== Wins ===
1977
Emmy for Family
1979
Emmy for Family
1980
People's Choice Award for "Favorite Young Motion Picture Actress"
1982
Young Artist Award for Only When I Laugh

=== Nominations ===
1978
Emmy for Family
1979
Golden Globe for Family
1980
Emmy for Family
Young Artist Award for Family
1981
Young Artist Award for My Old Man and Little Darlings
1982
Golden Globe for Only When I Laugh
