= Leonard Hill Films =

Defunct American television production company

- Formerly: Hill-Mandelker Films (1981–1985); Hill-Fields Entertainment (1993–1997)
- Industry: Television
- Founded: 1981
- Defunct: 2000 (First era); 2011 (Second era)
- Fate: Shut down
- Successor: Multicom Entertainment Group (Owner of most of company's assets)
- Headquarters: United States
- Key people: Leonard Hill, Phillip Mandelker
- Products: Television, made-for-TV movies
- Owner: Leonard Hill

Leonard Hill Films was a production company that was founded in 1981 as Hill-Mandelker Films. The company mainly specialized in made-for-television-movies, producing two television series in 1987 and a feature film in 2011. The company has since closed down following the release of Dorfman in Love in 2011.

== History ==
In 1981, following the success of Amber Waves, an ABC TV movie released the previous year, ABC executive Leonard Hill got together with Amber Waves’ executive producer Phillip Mandelker to form a company where they would start their own production banner. The new company was called Hill-Mandelker Films, and held a distribution deal with Novacom, Inc. (which was co-owned by Bruce Paisner and PBS affiliate WGBH in Boston and was renamed King Features Entertainment after being acquired by the Hearst Corporation in 1981). Throughout the producing duo's three-year partnership, they produced a significant share of movies like Freedom and Dream House, both in 1981. The company had also tried their hand in television series production, with the single season CBS series Tucker's Witch in 1982 and the failed pilot to High School U.S.A. in 1984.

In 1984, Hill met Jon Avnet and it was interested in forming a movie alliance as Avnet sold its films to Fries Entertainment and giving Hill to King Features Entertainment and the next year held an interview that was building a movie alliance.

When Mandelker died in 1984, the company became Leonard Hill Films. The first production produced under this new banner was Mirrors, the 1985 adaptation of the James Lipton book, and continued with movies like The Long Hot Summer (1986), Passion and Paradise (1989), False Arrest (1991), Dead Before Dawn and Stalking Laura (both in 1993). In addition, LHF also ventured into television series production with Rags to Riches, which aired for a single season on NBC.

At one point, Robert O'Connor joined LHF, though only one project, Jack the Ripper (1988), was accredited to Hill-O'Connor Television, a new production company that Hill and O'Connor set up in 1986 to produce television series, miniseries and television movies. O'Connor left the company in 1988.

The company, alongside fellow producers Steve Tisch, Robert Greenwald, Frank Von Zerneck, Michael Jaffe, Frank Koingsberg, Jon Avnet, Steve White, their respective partners, and the filmed entertainment division of Spectacor, launched Allied Communications, Inc. (or ACI Worldwide Distribution for short) in 1989 to distribute its productions made upon the capital. Hill was previously worked as members of its predecessor of ACI, The Movie Alliance, a firm that was distributed by King Features Entertainment, that existed prior to the formation of ACI.

In 1993, Joel Fields merged his banner with the company and it became Hill-Fields Entertainment. The company continued its success with films like A Matter of Justice (1993), Justice in a Small Town (1994), Welcome to Paradise, Deadly Whispers (both in 1995), and Detention: The Siege at Johnson High (1997).

ACI was acquired by Pearson PLC in November 1995 for $40 million, with HFE going dormant following Fields' departure two years later. ACI was continued as a subsidiary of Pearson Television, until 1999 when it was folded. In 2000, Hill-Fields Entertainment, renamed Leonard Hill Films, reemerged from dormancy to produce one final movie, Stolen From the Heart.

In 2011, LHF was briefly revived for the production of the independent feature film, Dorfman in Love, starring Sara Rue as the film's titular character. Hill would since divert his attention to real estate development, passing five years later.

Until sometime in the 2010s, Pearson Television successor FremantleMedia held the rights to most of Hill's productions, with Hearst Entertainment administering his pre-1986 productions. That was until independent distributor Multicom Entertainment Group brought out the entire library of Hill and four other producers that used ACI to distribute their productions. With the exception of Jack the Ripper (which is still retained by FremantleMedia, but by the way of Thames Television, not ACI), Rags to Riches (owned by Vine Alternate Investments by the way of New World's pre-1990 library), and Dorfman in Love (owned by distributor Brainstorm Media), Multicom is currently the worldwide proprietor of the LHF library.

== Incomplete List of Productions ==
as Hill/Mandelker Films

- Dreams Don't Die
- Tucker's Witch
- The Cartier Affair (co-production with B&E Enterprises/King Features Entertainment)

as Leonard Hill Films

- Mirrors
- The Long Hot Summer
- The Insiders (co-production with Universal Television)
- Rags to Riches (co-production with New World Television)
- Passion and Paradise
- Summer Dreams: The Story of the Beach Boys
- Earth Angel (co-production with Ron Gilbert Associates)
- Vanished Without a Trace

as Hill/Fields Entertainment

- Vows of Deception (co-production with Frank Abatemarco Productions)
- Falling from the Sky (co-production with Pacific Motion Pictures/ACI Worldwide Distribution)
