= Leonard Hill (producer) =

Television producer

- Born: Leonard Franklin Hill; October 11, 1947; Westwood, Los Angeles, California
- Died: June 7, 2016 (aged 68); Hancock Park, Los Angeles
- Occupation: Television producer

Leonard Franklin Hill (October 11, 1947 – June 7, 2016) was an American television producer and property developer. Hill began his career as a television writer, writing scripts for numerous shows, including Adam-12, an NBC police drama. He then became a television executive, serving first at NBC before becoming Vice President of Movies at ABC. Hill produced four television miniseries, dozens of television movies and three drama series during his tenures at NBC and ABC. His television movies were mostly distributed by Pearson Television, who was once successor of ACI, and originally was part of The Movie Alliance prior to the formation of ACI.

The popularity of television films had waned by the early 2000s, which prompted a career change by Hill. In 2001, switched to real estate development, with a focus on downtown Los Angeles and adaptive reuse. Hill partnered with Yuval Bar-Zemer, a developer with a history of reuse, to establish Linear City Development. Together, Hill and Bar-Zemer instigated numerous projects within the city's Arts District, on the eastern edge of Downtown Los Angeles by transforming existing buildings into new housing and developments. Hill's projects included the Toy Factory Lofts, which were finished in 2004, the nearby Biscuit Company Lofts, and the Elysian, which transformed the former headquarters of the Metropolitan Water District of Southern California into residential building containing loft apartments near Echo Park in 2014.

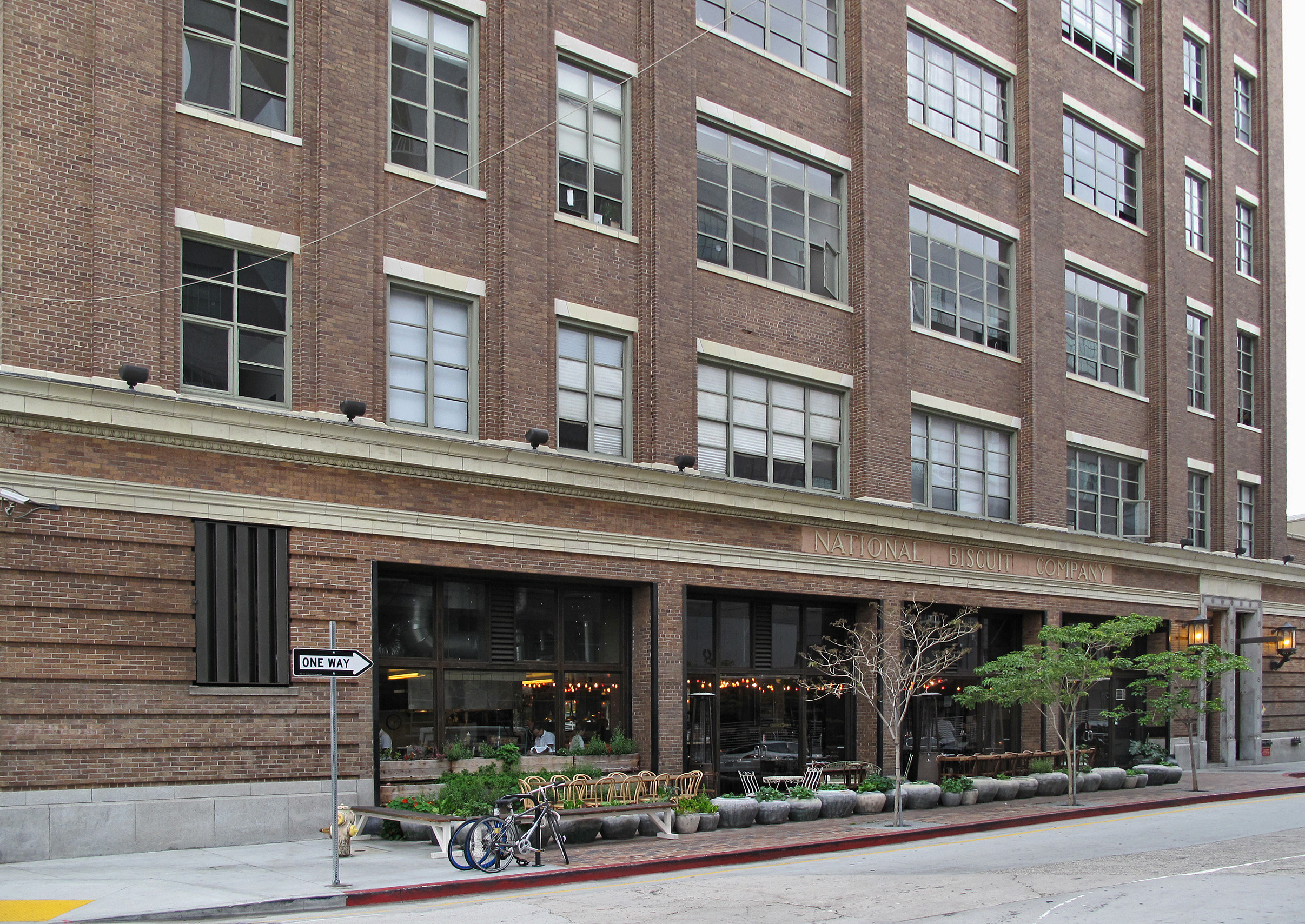
Biscuit Company Lofts

In 2016, Hill donated $1.9 million to create a new public park under the newly constructed Sixth Street Bridge. It was announced that the new park will be named in Hill's honor, following his death in 2016.

Leonard Hill was born in Westwood, Los Angeles, on October 11, 1947, to Edith Hill, a social worker, and Herbert Hill, a businessman. He attended University High School and received his bachelor's degree from Yale University and his master's degree from Stanford University.

Hill died at his home in Hancock Park, Los Angeles, on June 7, 2016, at the age of 68. He was survived by his second wife, Dr. Patricia Gordon, whom he married in 2011, and two brothers, Andrew Hill and Rick Hill.
