= List of RiffTrax =

The following is a list of RiffTrax, downloadable audio commentaries featuring comedian Michael J. Nelson and others ridiculing (or riffing on) films in the style of Mystery Science Theater 3000, a TV show of which Nelson was the head writer and later the host. The RiffTrax are sold online as downloadable audio commentaries and pre-synchronized videos.

The site was launched by Nelson and Legend Films in 2006 and is based in San Diego.

== Official RiffTrax ==
=== Just the Jokes ===
The following is a list of films for which Michael J. Nelson and guest riffers have provided an audio commentary only, with no VOD available. They are presented in order of the release date. Titles in bold are no longer available.

Movie	Riffer(s)	RiffTrax released	Original release
Road House	Michael J. Nelson	July 21, 2006	1989
The Fifth Element	Michael J. Nelson	August 1, 2006	1997
Star Trek V: The Final Frontier	Michael J. Nelson and Kevin Murphy	August 18, 2006	1989
Cocktail	Michael J. Nelson	August 29, 2006	1988
xXx	Michael J. Nelson	September 6, 2006	2002
Crossroads	Michael J. Nelson	September 15, 2006	2002
X-Men	Michael J. Nelson and Bill Corbett	September 22, 2006	2000
Top Gun	Michael J. Nelson and Bill Corbett	September 29, 2006	1986
**Point Break**	Michael J. Nelson	October 10, 2006	1991
Halloween	Michael J. Nelson and Kevin Murphy	October 19, 2006	1978
The Matrix	Michael J. Nelson and Kevin Murphy	October 25, 2006	1999
Star Wars Episode I: The Phantom Menace	Michael J. Nelson and Kevin Murphy	November 1, 2006	1999
The Grudge	Michael J. Nelson and Kevin Murphy	November 10, 2006	2004
The Lord of the Rings: The Fellowship of the Ring	Michael J. Nelson and Kevin Murphy	November 21, 2006	2001
The Island of Dr. Moreau	Michael J. Nelson and Kevin Murphy	December 1, 2006	1996
Firewall	Michael J. Nelson and Kevin Murphy	December 8, 2006	2006
Reign of Fire	Michael J. Nelson and Kevin Murphy	December 22, 2006	2002
Daredevil	Michael J. Nelson, Kevin Murphy, and Bill Corbett	January 18, 2007	2003
Battlefield Earth (Note: Later released as VOD)	Michael J. Nelson, Kevin Murphy, and Bill Corbett	January 28, 2007	2000
Troll 2	Michael J. Nelson and Richard "Lowtax" Kyanka	February 2, 2007	1990
Star Trek VI: The Undiscovered Country	Michael J. Nelson, Kevin Murphy, and Bill Corbett	February 9, 2007	1991
Over the Top	Michael J. Nelson	February 16, 2007	1987
Æon Flux	Michael J. Nelson and Kevin Murphy	February 23, 2007	2006
The Wicker Man	Michael J. Nelson and Kevin Murphy	March 2, 2007	2006
Terminator 3: Rise of the Machines	Michael J. Nelson and Kevin Murphy	March 16, 2007	2003
Lost ("Pilot")	Michael J. Nelson and Kevin Murphy	March 30, 2007	2004
Star Wars Episode II: Attack of the Clones	Michael J. Nelson, Kevin Murphy, and Chad Vader	April 6, 2007	2002
Willy Wonka & the Chocolate Factory	Michael J. Nelson and Neil Patrick Harris	April 13, 2007	1971
Casino Royale	Michael J. Nelson and Kevin Murphy	April 30, 2007	2006
Eragon	Michael J. Nelson and Kevin Murphy	May 11, 2007	2006
Glitter	Michael J. Nelson and Mary Jo Pehl	May 21, 2007	2001
Predator	Michael J. Nelson	June 1, 2007	1987
Grey's Anatomy ("A Hard Day's Night" and "The First Cut Is the Deepest")	Michael J. Nelson and Bridget Jones Nelson	June 11, 2007	2005
Fantastic Four	Michael J. Nelson and Kevin Murphy	June 22, 2007	2005
Star Trek Generations	Michael J. Nelson and Kevin Murphy	July 2, 2007	1994
300	Michael J. Nelson, Kevin Murphy, and Bill Corbett	July 31, 2007	2007
The Bourne Identity	Michael J. Nelson, Kevin Murphy, and Bill Corbett	August 7, 2007	2002
Independence Day	Michael J. Nelson, Kevin Murphy, and Bill Corbett	August 14, 2007	1996
Heroes ("Genesis" and "Don't Look Back")	Michael J. Nelson	September 4, 2007	2006
Star Wars Episode III: Revenge of the Sith	Michael J. Nelson, Kevin Murphy, and Bill Corbett	September 25, 2007	2005
Raiders of the Lost Ark	Michael J. Nelson, Kevin Murphy, and Bill Corbett	October 2, 2007	1981
Spider-Man	Michael J. Nelson, Kevin Murphy, and Bill Corbett	October 9, 2007	2002
Next	Michael J. Nelson and Bridget Nelson	October 16, 2007	2007
Transformers	Michael J. Nelson, Kevin Murphy, and Bill Corbett	November 20, 2007	2007
Harry Potter and the Sorcerer's Stone	Michael J. Nelson, Kevin Murphy, and Bill Corbett	November 27, 2007	2001
Fantastic Four: Rise of the Silver Surfer	Michael J. Nelson, Kevin Murphy, and Bill Corbett	December 18, 2007	2007
Batman & Robin	Michael J. Nelson, Kevin Murphy, and Bill Corbett (material provided by Riff Raff Theater)	January 29, 2008	1997
Jurassic Park	Michael J. Nelson and "Weird Al" Yankovic	February 5, 2008	1993
The Matrix Reloaded	Michael J. Nelson, Kevin Murphy, and Bill Corbett	February 19, 2008	2003
Beowulf	Michael J. Nelson, Kevin Murphy, and Bill Corbett	March 18, 2008	2007
Spider-Man 3	Michael J. Nelson and James Lileks	April 8, 2008	2007
Cloverfield	Michael J. Nelson, Kevin Murphy, and Bill Corbett	April 23, 2008	2008
I Am Legend	Michael J. Nelson, Kevin Murphy, and Bill Corbett	April 29, 2008	2007
The Lord of the Rings: The Two Towers	Michael J. Nelson, Kevin Murphy, and Bill Corbett	May 23, 2008	2002
The Sixth Sense	Michael J. Nelson, Kevin Murphy, and Bill Corbett	June 25, 2008	1999
Harry Potter and the Chamber of Secrets	Michael J. Nelson, Kevin Murphy, and Bill Corbett	August 5, 2008	2002
Memento	Michael J. Nelson, Kevin Murphy, and Bill Corbett	August 12, 2008	2001
Ocean's Eleven	Michael J. Nelson and Richard Cheese	August 26, 2008	2001
Pirates of the Caribbean: The Curse of the Black Pearl	Michael J. Nelson, Kevin Murphy, and Bill Corbett	September 9, 2008	2003
Iron Man	Michael J. Nelson, Kevin Murphy, and Bill Corbett	October 14, 2008	2008
The Happening	Michael J. Nelson, Kevin Murphy, and Bill Corbett	October 21, 2008	2008
Indiana Jones and the Kingdom of the Crystal Skull	Michael J. Nelson, Kevin Murphy, and Bill Corbett	October 28, 2008	2008
X2	Michael J. Nelson, Kevin Murphy, and Bill Corbett	November 12, 2008	2003
The Dark Knight	Michael J. Nelson, Kevin Murphy, and Bill Corbett	December 9, 2008	2008
Harry Potter and the Prisoner of Azkaban	Michael J. Nelson, Kevin Murphy, and Bill Corbett	December 16, 2008	2004
Star Wars Episode IV: A New Hope	Michael J. Nelson, Kevin Murphy, and Bill Corbett	December 30, 2008	1977
Jaws	Michael J. Nelson, Kevin Murphy, and Bill Corbett	February 24, 2009	1975
Star Wars Episode V: The Empire Strikes Back	Michael J. Nelson, Kevin Murphy, Bill Corbett, and Chad Vader	April 14, 2009	1980
Twilight	Michael J. Nelson, Kevin Murphy, and Bill Corbett	April 21, 2009	2008
Casablanca	Michael J. Nelson, Kevin Murphy, and Bill Corbett	June 2, 2009	1942
The Room	Michael J. Nelson, Kevin Murphy, and Bill Corbett	June 18, 2009	2003
Red Dawn	Michael J. Nelson and Joel McHale	July 2, 2009	1984
Fast & Furious	Michael J. Nelson, Kevin Murphy, and Bill Corbett	August 6, 2009	2009
The Matrix Revolutions	Michael J. Nelson, Kevin Murphy, and Bill Corbett	September 29, 2009	2003
Transformers: Revenge of the Fallen	Michael J. Nelson, Kevin Murphy, and Bill Corbett	October 22, 2009	2009
Titanic	Michael J. Nelson, Kevin Murphy, and Bill Corbett	October 29, 2009	1997
Star Trek	Michael J. Nelson, Kevin Murphy, and Bill Corbett	November 19, 2009	2009
Drag Me to Hell	Michael J. Nelson and Bill Corbett	December 1, 2009	2009
Star Wars Episode VI: Return of the Jedi	Michael J. Nelson, Kevin Murphy, and Bill Corbett	January 22, 2010	1983
Terminator Salvation	Michael J. Nelson, Kevin Murphy, and Bill Corbett	February 4, 2010	2009
Paranormal Activity	Michael J. Nelson, Kevin Murphy and Bill Corbett	February 11, 2010	2007
The Twilight Saga: New Moon	Michael J. Nelson, Kevin Murphy, and Bill Corbett	March 19, 2010	2009
Avatar	Michael J. Nelson, Kevin Murphy, and Bill Corbett	April 24, 2010	2009
Harry Potter and the Goblet of Fire	Michael J. Nelson, Kevin Murphy, and Bill Corbett	May 14, 2010	2005
The Lord of the Rings: The Return of the King	Michael J. Nelson, Kevin Murphy, and Bill Corbett	June 22, 2010	2003
High School Musical	Michael J. Nelson, Kevin Murphy, and Bill Corbett	September 24, 2010	2006
Clash of the Titans	Michael J. Nelson, Kevin Murphy, and Bill Corbett	October 22, 2010	2010
The Last Airbender	Michael J. Nelson, Kevin Murphy, and Bill Corbett	November 16, 2010	2010
The Twilight Saga: Eclipse	Michael J. Nelson, Kevin Murphy, and Bill Corbett	December 3, 2010	2010
Inception	Michael J. Nelson, Kevin Murphy, and Bill Corbett	February 1, 2011	2010
Harry Potter and the Order of the Phoenix	Michael J. Nelson, Kevin Murphy, and Bill Corbett	February 15, 2011	2007
Highlander	Michael J. Nelson, Kevin Murphy, and Bill Corbett	March 15, 2011	1986
The Karate Kid Part III	Michael J. Nelson, Kevin Murphy, and Bill Corbett	March 22, 2011	1989
Star Trek II: The Wrath of Khan	Michael J. Nelson, Kevin Murphy, and Bill Corbett	April 12, 2011	1982
X-Men: The Last Stand	Michael J. Nelson, Kevin Murphy, and Bill Corbett	June 21, 2011	2006
Thor	Michael J. Nelson, Kevin Murphy, and Bill Corbett	September 27, 2011	2011
Harry Potter and the Half-Blood Prince	Michael J. Nelson, Kevin Murphy, and Bill Corbett	October 18, 2011	2009
Transformers: Dark of the Moon	Michael J. Nelson, Kevin Murphy, and Bill Corbett	November 22, 2011	2011
Captain America: The First Avenger	Michael J. Nelson, Kevin Murphy, and Bill Corbett	January 10, 2012	2011
Rise of the Planet of the Apes	Michael J. Nelson, Kevin Murphy, and Bill Corbett	February 14, 2012	2011
The Twilight Saga: Breaking Dawn, Part I	Michael J. Nelson, Kevin Murphy, and Bill Corbett	February 23, 2012	2011
The Hunger Games	Michael J. Nelson, Kevin Murphy, and Bill Corbett	September 27, 2012	2012
The Avengers	Michael J. Nelson, Kevin Murphy, and Bill Corbett	December 27, 2012	2012
The Twilight Saga: Breaking Dawn, Part II	Michael J. Nelson, Kevin Murphy, and Bill Corbett	March 14, 2013	2012
Starship Troopers	Michael J. Nelson, Kevin Murphy, and Bill Corbett	October 4, 2013	1997
Harry Potter and the Deathly Hallows – Part 1	Michael J. Nelson, Kevin Murphy, and Bill Corbett	November 1, 2013	2010
The Wizard of Oz	Michael J. Nelson, Kevin Murphy, and Bill Corbett	January 17, 2014	1939
Godzilla	Michael J. Nelson, Kevin Murphy, and Bill Corbett	October 31, 2014	1998
Teenage Mutant Ninja Turtles	Michael J. Nelson, Kevin Murphy, and Bill Corbett	February 27, 2015	2014
Anaconda	Michael J. Nelson, Kevin Murphy, and Bill Corbett	March 13, 2015	1997
Harry Potter and the Deathly Hallows – Part 2	Michael J. Nelson, Kevin Murphy, and Bill Corbett	March 8, 2016	2011
The Room (RiffTrax "Live" Edition)	Michael J. Nelson, Kevin Murphy, and Bill Corbett	March 8, 2016	2003
Star Wars: The Force Awakens	Michael J. Nelson, Kevin Murphy, and Bill Corbett	April 29, 2016	2015
Game of Thrones ("Winter Is Coming")	Michael J. Nelson, Kevin Murphy, and Bill Corbett	June 1, 2016	2011
Road House (2016 Three Riffer Edition)	Michael J. Nelson, Kevin Murphy, and Bill Corbett	September 9, 2016	1989
The Walking Dead ("Days Gone Bye")	Michael J. Nelson, Kevin Murphy, and Bill Corbett	October 21, 2016	2010
Daredevil ("Into the Ring")	Michael J. Nelson, Kevin Murphy, and Bill Corbett	October 28, 2016	2015
Jurassic World	Michael J. Nelson, Kevin Murphy, and Bill Corbett	November 18, 2016	2015
Rogue One: A Star Wars Story	Michael J. Nelson, Kevin Murphy, and Bill Corbett	May 4, 2017	2016
Game of Thrones ("The Rains of Castamere")	Michael J. Nelson, Kevin Murphy, and Bill Corbett	July 26, 2017	2013
Mothra	Michael J. Nelson, Kevin Murphy, and Bill Corbett	August 18, 2017	1961
Westworld ("The Original")	Michael J. Nelson, Kevin Murphy, and Bill Corbett	December 6, 2017	2016
Batman v Superman: Dawn of Justice	Michael J. Nelson, Kevin Murphy, Bill Corbett, Bridget Nelson, Mary Jo Pehl, Frank Conniff, Trace Beaulieu, Sean Thomason, Conor Lastowka, Cole Stratton, Janet Varney, Matthew J. Elliott, and Ian Potter	December 15, 2017	2016
Star Wars: The Last Jedi	Michael J. Nelson, Kevin Murphy, and Bill Corbett	May 4, 2018	2017
Ready Player One	Michael J. Nelson, Kevin Murphy, and Bill Corbett	October 19, 2018	2018
Stranger Things ("Chapter One: The Vanishing of Will Byers")	Michael J. Nelson, Kevin Murphy, and Bill Corbett	November 28, 2018	2016
Solo: A Star Wars Story	Michael J. Nelson, Kevin Murphy, and Bill Corbett	December 21, 2018	2018
Krull	Michael J. Nelson, Kevin Murphy, and Bill Corbett	December 28, 2018	1983
Street Fighter	Michael J. Nelson, Kevin Murphy, and Bill Corbett	August 23, 2019	1994
Jurassic World: Fallen Kingdom	Michael J. Nelson, Kevin Murphy, and Bill Corbett	November 8, 2019	2018
Star Wars: The Rise of Skywalker	Michael J. Nelson, Kevin Murphy, and Bill Corbett	April 3, 2020	2019
Avengers: Endgame	Michael J. Nelson, Kevin Murphy, and Bill Corbett	July 24, 2020	2019
Gymkata	Michael J. Nelson, Kevin Murphy, and Bill Corbett	October 16, 2020	1985
Mortal Kombat	Michael J. Nelson, Kevin Murphy, and Bill Corbett	December 4, 2020	1995
Face/Off	Michael J. Nelson, Kevin Murphy, and Bill Corbett	June 25, 2021	1997
Money Plane	Michael J. Nelson, Kevin Murphy, and Bill Corbett	October 1, 2021	2020
Old	Michael J. Nelson, Kevin Murphy, and Bill Corbett	April 22, 2022	2021
Cats	Michael J. Nelson, Kevin Murphy, and Bill Corbett	September 2, 2022	2019
Dune	Michael J. Nelson, Kevin Murphy, and Bill Corbett	December 30, 2022	2021
Cobra	Michael J. Nelson, Kevin Murphy, and Bill Corbett	May 12, 2023	1986
Top Gun: Maverick	Michael J. Nelson, Kevin Murphy, and Bill Corbett	November 10, 2023	2022
Over the Top (Three Riffer Edition)	Michael J. Nelson, Kevin Murphy, and Bill Corbett	November 30, 2024	1987
The Karate Kid	Michael J. Nelson, Kevin Murphy, and Bill Corbett	February 21, 2025	1984

=== RiffTrax Presents ===
These are RiffTrax in which Michael J. Nelson does not appear.

Movie	Riffer(s)	RiffTrax released	Original release
Star Trek: Phase II: "World Enough and Time"	Kevin Murphy and Bill Corbett	May 8, 2008	2007
Dark Water	Matthew J. Elliott	May 8, 2008	2005
Saw	Kevin Murphy and Bill Corbett	May 13, 2008	2004
House of Wax (2005)	Matthew J. Elliott	May 28, 2008	2005
Star Trek: Phase II: "To Serve All My Days"	Kevin Murphy and Bill Corbett	May 28, 2008	2006
The X-Files (film)	Mary Jo Pehl and Bill Corbett	June 3, 2008	1998
Alien	Kevin Murphy and Bill Corbett	June 10, 2008	1979
Spider-Man 2	Kevin Murphy, Bill Corbett, and Josh Fruhlinger	September 5, 2008	2004
The Day After Tomorrow	Kevin Murphy and Bill Corbett	September 16, 2008	2004
Dirty Dancing	Cole Stratton and Janet Varney	September 23, 2008	1987
Die Hard	Matthew J. Elliott	April 10, 2009	1988
Tron	Paul and Storm and Jonathan Coulton	May 26, 2009	1982
Ghost	Cole Stratton and Janet Varney	June 25, 2009	1990
The Running Man	Blame Society Productions and Chad Vader	July 9, 2009	1987
Batman Forever	Doug Walker, Rob Walker, and Brian Heinz	July 30, 2009	1995
Planet of the Apes (1968)	Matthew J. Elliott	September 1, 2009	1968
Footloose	Cole Stratton and Janet Varney	November 5, 2009	1984
Ghost Rider	Aaron Yonda, Matt Sloan, and Nicolas Kage	November 13, 2009	2007
Poltergeist	Cole Stratton and Janet Varney	April 15, 2010	1982
Armageddon	Matthew J. Elliott	June 11, 2010	1998
The Lost Boys	Cole Stratton and Janet Varney	July 15, 2010	1987
Jaws 3	Cole Stratton and Janet Varney	October 8, 2010	1983
Jurassic Park III	Matthew J. Elliott	April 15, 2011	2001
Sherlock Holmes	Matthew J. Elliott	December 12, 2011	2009
Flatliners	Cole Stratton and Janet Varney	July 19, 2012	1990
The Expendables	Matthew J. Elliott	September 13, 2012	2010
Horror Express	Matthew J. Elliott	March 28, 2013	1972 in Spain, 1973 in USA
King of Kong Island	Matthew J. Elliott and Ian Potter	January 28, 2014	1968
Scared to Death	Matthew J. Elliott and Ian Potter	August 4, 2014	1947
Warning from Space	Matthew J. Elliott and Ian Potter	May 15, 2015	1956 in Japan, 1963 in USA
Life in the Suburbs	Bridget Nelson and Mary Jo Pehl	June 12, 2015	1957
Dreamscape	Cole Stratton and Janet Varney	June 19, 2015	1984
A Word to the Wives	Bridget Nelson and Mary Jo Pehl	June 30, 2015	1955
The Relaxed Wife / Consuming Women (Women as Consumers)	Bridget Nelson and Mary Jo Pehl	July 23, 2015	1957 / 1967
Naturally... a Girl	Bridget Nelson and Mary Jo Pehl	August 7, 2015	1973
Cindy Goes to a Party	Bridget Nelson and Mary Jo Pehl	September 15, 2015	1955
The Prom: It's a Pleasure	Bridget Nelson and Mary Jo Pehl	September 28, 2015	1961
Oh Boy! Babies!	Bridget Nelson and Mary Jo Pehl	October 9, 2015	1982
The Snob	Bridget Nelson and Mary Jo Pehl	October 20, 2015	1958
Have a Mary Jo Christmas and a Bridget New Year! (featuring A Christmas Carol [edited version of Scrooge] and The Little Lamb)	Bridget Nelson and Mary Jo Pehl	December 11, 2015	1952 / 1955
Marriage is a Partnership	Bridget Nelson and Mary Jo Pehl	January 8, 2016	1951
Phoebe	Bridget Nelson and Mary Jo Pehl	March 15, 2016	1964
Flight to Mars	Matthew J. Elliott and Ian Potter	March 18, 2016	1951
Social Acceptability	Bridget Nelson and Mary Jo Pehl	April 12, 2016	1957
Cat-Women of the Moon	Bridget Nelson and Mary Jo Pehl	April 15, 2016	1953
Gravity	Bridget Nelson and Mary Jo Pehl	June 9, 2016	2013
The Magic Shelf	Bridget Nelson and Mary Jo Pehl	July 5, 2016	1952
Duties of a Secretary	Bridget Nelson and Mary Jo Pehl	July 14, 2016	1947
Girls are Better than Ever	Bridget Nelson and Mary Jo Pehl	July 29, 2016	1967
Flash That Smile	Bridget Nelson and Mary Jo Pehl	September 14, 2016	1984
Peer Pressure: Nobody Tells Me What to Do!	Bridget Nelson and Mary Jo Pehl	September 29, 2016	1983
The Second Annual Bridget and Mary Jo Christmas Special! (featuring Carving Magic and a 1953 Christmas home movie)	Bridget Nelson and Mary Jo Pehl with guests Beth "Beez" McKeever and Kevin Murphy	December 16, 2016	1959 / 1953
The Home of the Future (1999 A.D.)	Bridget Nelson and Mary Jo Pehl	December 27, 2016	1967
Katy	Bridget Nelson and Mary Jo Pehl	January 4, 2017	1974
The Amazing Mr. X	Bridget Nelson and Mary Jo Pehl	January 6, 2017	1948
The Maturing Woman	Bridget Nelson and Mary Jo Pehl	March 3, 2017	1977
Angels Revenge	Bridget Nelson and Mary Jo Pehl	April 7, 2017	1979
American Look	Bridget Nelson and Mary Jo Pehl	May 10, 2017	1958
Hangar 18	Matthew J. Elliott and Ian Potter	June 23, 2017	1980
Farm Family in Summer	Bridget Nelson and Mary Jo Pehl	August 30, 2017	1968
Deadly Instincts	Bridget Nelson and Mary Jo Pehl	September 8, 2017	1997
Boredom at Work	Bridget Nelson and Mary Jo Pehl	October 3, 2017	1961
Farm Family in Autumn	Bridget Nelson and Mary Jo Pehl	October 19, 2017	1967
The Babysitter	Bridget Nelson and Mary Jo Pehl	November 3, 2017	ca. 1950
Let's Talk Turkey	Bridget Nelson and Mary Jo Pehl	November 22, 2017	1955
Farm Family in Winter	Bridget Nelson and Mary Jo Pehl	November 26, 2017	1967
Beyond Christmas	Bridget Nelson and Mary Jo Pehl	December 15, 2017	1940
Harry the Dirty Dog	Bridget Nelson and Mary Jo Pehl	January 24, 2018	1987
Planet Outlaws	Matthew J. Elliott and Ian Potter	March 2, 2018	1939
Farm Family in Spring	Bridget Nelson and Mary Jo Pehl	March 28, 2018	1967
Bridget and Mary Jo: The Spring Collection (featuring Fashion for Go Getters, Accent on Spring, and Match Your Mood)	Bridget Nelson and Mary Jo Pehl	April 6, 2018	Various
Junior Prom	Bridget Nelson and Mary Jo Pehl	April 27, 2018	1946
How to Be a Friend	Bridget Nelson and Mary Jo Pehl	May 23, 2018	1977
Sherlock Holmes and the Woman in Green	Bridget Nelson and Mary Jo Pehl	June 8, 2018	1945
Snowbeast	Matthew J. Elliott and Ian Potter	June 29, 2018	1977
What Mary Jo Wanted	Bridget Nelson and Mary Jo Pehl	July 6, 2018	1982
She	Bridget Nelson and Mary Jo Pehl	July 18, 2018	1935
Devil Girl from Mars	Bridget Nelson and Mary Jo Pehl	August 2, 2018	1954
Freddie Steps Out	Bridget Nelson and Mary Jo Pehl	September 7, 2018	1946
Rescue Me	Bridget Nelson and Mary Jo Pehl	September 21, 2018	1992
Ladybug, Ladybug, Winter Is Coming	Bridget Nelson and Mary Jo Pehl	October 24, 2018	1976
Charlie's Christmas Secret	Bridget Nelson and Mary Jo Pehl	December 19, 2018	1984
Sherlock Holmes: Dressed to Kill	Bridget Nelson and Mary Jo Pehl	January 4, 2019	1946
Wonderful World of Tupperware	Bridget Nelson and Mary Jo Pehl	January 9, 2019	1959
Purple Death from Outer Space	Matthew J. Elliott and Ian Potter	February 1, 2019	1966
She Demons	Bridget Nelson and Mary Jo Pehl	March 22, 2019	1958
Scared to Death	Bridget Nelson and Mary Jo Pehl	April 5, 2019	1980
The Boy Who Didn't Listen	Bridget Nelson and Mary Jo Pehl	April 12, 2019	1974
High School Hero	Bridget Nelson and Mary Jo Pehl	May 3, 2019	1946
My Mother Was Never a Kid	Bridget Nelson and Mary Jo Pehl	May 12, 2019	1981
What Mary Jo Shared	Bridget Nelson and Mary Jo Pehl	June 16, 2019	1981
Sherlock Holmes and the Deadly Necklace	Bridget Nelson and Matthew J. Elliott	June 21, 2019	1962
Fear	Bridget Nelson and Mary Jo Pehl	July 26, 2019	1946
The Troublemaker	Bridget Nelson and Mary Jo Pehl	July 29, 2019	1959
Vacation Days	Bridget Nelson and Mary Jo Pehl	September 6, 2019	1947
Atom Age Vampire	Matthew J. Elliott and Ian Potter	September 20, 2019	1960
Bridget and Mary Jo's Halloween Safety and Monster Mash-Up (featuring Halloween Safety and 8mm edits of The Wolf Man, It Came from Outer Space and The Bride of Frankenstein)	Bridget Nelson and Mary Jo Pehl	October 30, 2019	Various
Last Woman on Earth	Bridget Nelson, Mary Jo Pehl, Matthew J. Elliott, and Ian Potter	November 15, 2019	1960
What Will Bernard Do	Bridget Nelson and Mary Jo Pehl	November 22, 2019	1968
A Very Merry Riff-Mas (featuring Yes, Virginia, There Is a Santa Claus; Frosty the Snowman; and Christmas on Grandfather's Farm)	Bridget Nelson and Mary Jo Pehl	December 20, 2019	Various
Sherlock Holmes: Terror by Night	Bridget Nelson and Mary Jo Pehl	January 3, 2020	1946
Strange Impersonation	Bridget Nelson and Mary Jo Pehl	January 10, 2020	1946
Squeak the Squirrel	Bridget Nelson and Mary Jo Pehl	January 21, 2020	1957
Kids Guide to the Internet	Conor Lastowka and Sean Thomason	January 29, 2020	1997
Bicycle Safety Camp	Conor Lastowka and Sean Thomason	February 12, 2020	1989
Lady Mobster	Bridget Nelson and Mary Jo Pehl	March 6, 2020	1988
Sherlock Holmes and the Secret Weapon	Bridget Nelson and Mary Jo Pehl	April 17, 2020	1943
Arranging the Buffet Supper	Bridget Nelson and Mary Jo Pehl	May 10, 2020	1946
Bride of the Gorilla	Bridget Nelson and Mary Jo Pehl	May 29, 2020	1951
Assignment: Outer Space	Matthew J. Elliott and Ian Potter	June 5, 2020	1960
Speak Up, Andrew!	Bridget Nelson and Mary Jo Pehl	July 21, 2020	1981
Senior Power and How to Use It! (Released early to Kickstarter 2020 supporters)	Bridget Nelson and Mary Jo Pehl	July 22, 2020	1975
Keeping Clean and Neat	Bridget Nelson and Mary Jo Pehl	July 28, 2020	1956
Frankenstein's Daughter	Bridget Nelson and Mary Jo Pehl	July 31, 2020	1958
High School U.S.A.	Bridget Nelson and Mary Jo Pehl	August 14, 2020	1983
Werewolf in a Girls' Dormitory	Matthew J. Elliott and Ian Potter	August 21, 2020	1961
My Brother Is Afraid of Just About Everything	Bridget Nelson and Mary Jo Pehl	September 4, 2020	1990
Amanda & The Alien	Bridget Nelson and Mary Jo Pehl	October 2, 2020	1995
What Ever Happened to Baby Jane? AKA What Ever Happened To...	Bridget Nelson and Mary Jo Pehl	October 23, 2020	1991
Baby of the Bride	Bridget Nelson and Mary Jo Pehl	December 11, 2020	1991
The Blessed Midnight	Bridget Nelson and Mary Jo Pehl	December 21, 2020	1956
In Between	Bridget Nelson and Mary Jo Pehl	January 4, 2021	
Invasion of the Bee Girls	Matthew J. Elliott and Ian Potter	January 8, 2021	1973
Earth Angel	Bridget Nelson and Mary Jo Pehl	January 23, 2021	1991
Beauty and the Bride	Bridget Nelson and Mary Jo Pehl	February 2, 2021	1953
The Veil - Part One	Matthew J. Elliott and Ian Potter	February 5, 2021	1958
How to Have a Moneymaking Garage Sale	Bridget Nelson and Mary Jo Pehl	March 10, 2021	1987
Wonder Woman 1984	Bridget Nelson and Mary Jo Pehl	March 19, 2021	2020
Wonder Walks	Bridget Nelson and Mary Jo Pehl	March 22, 2021	1971
Meet Mrs. Swenson	Bridget Nelson and Mary Jo Pehl	April 13, 2021	1956
Flash Gordon - Part One	Matthew J. Elliott and Ian Potter	April 16, 2021	1954
The Lady and the Rocket	Bridget Nelson and Mary Jo Pehl	April 30, 2021	1952
Mother of the Bride	Bridget Nelson and Mary Jo Pehl	May 7, 2021	1993
Mary Higgins Clark's Lucky Day	Bridget Nelson and Mary Jo Pehl	June 11, 2021	2002
The Box	Bridget Nelson and Mary Jo Pehl	June 18, 2021	1967
Mary Higgins Clark's Before I Say Goodbye	Bridget Nelson and Mary Jo Pehl	August 27, 2021	2003
Married Too Young	Bridget Nelson and Mary Jo Pehl	September 17, 2021	1962
Frances and Her Rabbit	Bridget Nelson and Mary Jo Pehl	September 29, 2021	1956
Why Study Science?	Bridget Nelson and Mary Jo Pehl	October 9, 2021	1955
Teenage Space Vampires	Bridget Nelson and Mary Jo Pehl	October 22, 2021	1999
It's a Cat's Life	Bridget Nelson and Mary Jo Pehl	October 29, 2021	1950
The Veil - Part Two	Matthew J. Elliott and Ian Potter	November 5, 2021	1958
Mary Higgins Clark's He Sees You When You're Sleeping	Bridget Nelson and Mary Jo Pehl	December 10, 2021	2002
Play in the Snow	Bridget Nelson and Mary Jo Pehl	January 1, 2022	1955
The Joy of Living with Fragrance	Bridget Nelson and Mary Jo Pehl	January 10, 2022	1962
Ol' #23	Bridget Nelson and Mary Jo Pehl	January 22, 2022	1980
Children of the Bride	Bridget Nelson and Mary Jo Pehl	February 4, 2022	1990
Good Grooming for Girls	Bridget Nelson and Mary Jo Pehl	February 12, 2022	1956
The Adventures of Chip and Dip	Bridget Nelson and Mary Jo Pehl	March 18, 2022	1968
Look Like a Winner: Military Etiquette and Grooming	Bridget Nelson and Mary Jo Pehl	April 4, 2022	1971
Flash Gordon - Part Two	Matthew J. Elliott and Ian Potter	April 7, 2022	1954
The Front Line	Bridget Nelson and Mary Jo Pehl	April 11, 2022	1965
Build Your Vocabulary	Bridget Nelson and Mary Jo Pehl	April 25, 2022	1948
Mary Higgins Clark's A Crime of Passion	Bridget Nelson and Mary Jo Pehl	May 6, 2022	2003
Heroine of the Week	Bridget Nelson and Mary Jo Pehl	May 28, 2022	1960
Jack and Jill	Bridget Nelson and Mary Jo Pehl	June 7, 2022	1951
Creature from the Haunted Sea	Matthew J. Elliott and Ian Potter	June 10, 2022	1961
The Grapevine	Bridget Nelson and Mary Jo Pehl	June 14, 2022	1958
Are Manners Important?	Bridget Nelson and Mary Jo Pehl	June 28, 2022	1954
Wanted: The Perfect Guy	Bridget Nelson and Mary Jo Pehl	July 8, 2022	1986
The Brain That Wouldn't Die	Bridget Nelson and Mary Jo Pehl	July 29, 2022	1962
Bus Nut	Bridget Nelson and Mary Jo Pehl	August 20, 2022	1980
The Juggling Lesson	Conor Lastowka and Sean Thomason	August 30, 2022	1983
Chickenomics: A Fowl Approach to Economics	Conor Lastowka and Sean Thomason	September 9, 2022	1979
This Is Roller Skating	Bridget Nelson and Mary Jo Pehl	September 23, 2022	c. 1950
Patterns for Smartness	Bridget Nelson and Mary Jo Pehl	October 8, 2022	1948
Ladyhawke	Cole Stratton and Janet Varney	October 14, 2022	1985
Woman Who Came Back	Bridget Nelson and Mary Jo Pehl	October 21, 2022	1945
Skippy and the Three R's	Bridget Nelson and Mary Jo Pehl	November 11, 2022	1953
In Winter	Bridget Nelson and Mary Jo Pehl	December 16, 2022	1967
Big Enough to Care	Bridget Nelson and Mary Jo Pehl	December 19, 2022	1953
God's Christmas Gift	Bridget Nelson and Mary Jo Pehl	December 22, 2022	1958
It All Depends on You	Bridget Nelson and Mary Jo Pehl	January 9, 2023	1968
The $20 Miracle	Bridget Nelson and Mary Jo Pehl	February 7, 2023	1967
How Do You Know It's Love?	Bridget Nelson and Mary Jo Pehl	February 14, 2023	1950
Mary Higgins Clark's I'll Be Seeing You	Bridget Nelson and Mary Jo Pehl	March 3, 2023	2004
How to Succeed with Brunettes	Bridget Nelson and Mary Jo Pehl	March 7, 2023	1966
Flash Gordon - Part Three	Matthew J. Elliott and Ian Potter	March 10, 2023	1954
Sherlock Holmes and the Scarlet Claw	Bridget Nelson and Mary Jo Pehl	March 24, 2023	1944
The Magnetic Monster	Bridget Nelson and Mary Jo Pehl	May 5, 2023	1953
City Pets: Fun and Responsibility	Bridget Nelson and Mary Jo Pehl	May 26, 2023	1953
Moon of the Wolf	Matthew J. Elliott and Ian Potter	June 9, 2023	1972
Inspector Mom	Bridget Nelson and Mary Jo Pehl	June 16, 2023	2006
The Man Without a Body	Bridget Nelson and Mary Jo Pehl	July 14, 2023	1957
The Careless Years	Bridget Nelson and Mary Jo Pehl	August 4, 2023	1957
Stoned	Bridget Nelson and Mary Jo Pehl	August 25, 2023	1980
How Animals Help Us	Bridget Nelson and Mary Jo Pehl	September 2, 2023	1954
Answering the Child's Why?	Bridget Nelson and Mary Jo Pehl	September 12, 2023	1951
The Veil - Part Three	Matthew J. Elliott and Ian Potter	October 6, 2023	1958
Mary Higgins Clark's Try To Remember	Bridget Nelson and Mary Jo Pehl	October 20, 2023	2004
Inspector Mom 2: Kidnapped in Ten Easy Steps	Bridget Nelson and Mary Jo Pehl	December 1, 2023	2007
The Super Mario Bros. Super Show!: Koopa Klaus	Conor Lastowka and Sean Thomason	December 13, 2023	1989
A Good Tree	Bridget Nelson and Mary Jo Pehl	December 19, 2023	1984
Santa and the Three Bears	Bridget Nelson and Mary Jo Pehl	December 22, 2023	1970
Blood on Her Hands	Bridget Nelson and Mary Jo Pehl	January 12, 2024	1998
Everyday Courtesy	Bridget Nelson and Mary Jo Pehl	January 30, 2024	1967
Are You Listening?	Bridget Nelson and Mary Jo Pehl	February 16, 2024	1971
Crime of Passion	Bridget Nelson and Mary Jo Pehl	February 23, 2024	1957
Sherlock Holmes and the House of Fear	Bridget Nelson and Mary Jo Pehl	April 19, 2024	1945
Tormented	Bridget Nelson and Mary Jo Pehl	June 7, 2024	1960
Rock, Rock, Rock!	Bridget Nelson and Mary Jo Pehl	June 28, 2024	1956
All the Kids Do It	Bridget Nelson and Mary Jo Pehl	July 5, 2024	1984
Stay Alive in '75 (Released May 24, 2024 to Kickstarter 2024 supporters)	Bridget Nelson and Mary Jo Pehl	July 20, 2024	1975
Sherlock Holmes: The Spider Woman	Bridget Nelson and Mary Jo Pehl	August 2, 2024	1943
She Gods of Shark Reef	Bridget Nelson and Mary Jo Pehl	August 23, 2024	1958
The Lady Vanishes	Matthew J. Elliott and Ian Potter	September 6, 2024	1938
The Wizard of No	Bridget Nelson and Mary Jo Pehl	September 10, 2024	1984
Student Court	Bridget Nelson and Mary Jo Pehl	September 24, 2024	1985
The Woman Who Sinned	Bridget Nelson and Mary Jo Pehl	October 4, 2024	1991
Introducing Video Toaster 4000	Conor Lastowka and Sean Thomason	October 29, 2024	1993
A Christmas Romance	Bridget Nelson and Mary Jo Pehl	December 13, 2024	1994
Sherlock: Case of Evil	Bridget Nelson and Mary Jo Pehl	February 7, 2025	2002
Crime - Senior Alert	Bridget Nelson and Mary Jo Pehl	February 11, 2025	1978
Acting Is Fun	Bridget Nelson and Mary Jo Pehl	February 25, 2025	1953
Q Planes	Matthew J. Elliott and Ian Potter	March 28, 2025	1939
Telezonia	Bridget Nelson and Mary Jo Pehl	April 12, 2025	1974
Untamed Women	Bridget Nelson and Mary Jo Pehl	May 9, 2025	1952
The Griper	Bridget Nelson and Mary Jo Pehl	May 20, 2025	1954
Pharaoh's Curse	Bridget Nelson and Mary Jo Pehl	June 27, 2025	1957
D.O.A.	Bridget Nelson and Mary Jo Pehl	August 1, 2025	1950
Total Electric Home	Bridget Nelson and Mary Jo Pehl	August 8, 2025	1959
When Sally Fell	Bridget Nelson and Mary Jo Pehl	August 27, 2025	1962
The Hound of the Baskervilles	Bridget Nelson and Mary Jo Pehl	August 29, 2025	1939
Young Man's Fancy	Bridget Nelson and Mary Jo Pehl	September 30, 2025	1952
The Gossip	Bridget Nelson and Mary Jo Pehl	October 15, 2025	1955
The Face of Marble	Bridget Nelson and Mary Jo Pehl	October 24, 2025	1946
Inspector Mom: The Mystery of Mrs. Plumlee	Bridget Nelson and Mary Jo Pehl	December 5, 2025	2006
A Christmas Wish	Bridget Nelson and Mary Jo Pehl	December 19, 2025	1950
High Treason	Matthew J. Elliott and Ian Potter	January 9, 2026	1929
Inspector Mom: Mother Goose Murder	Bridget Nelson and Mary Jo Pehl	January 23, 2026	2007
Rumpelstiltskin	Bridget Nelson and Mary Jo Pehl	January 27, 2026	1966
I Love Trouble	Bridget Nelson and Mary Jo Pehl	February 20, 2026	1948
Inspector Mom: The Corpse's Costume	Bridget Nelson and Mary Jo Pehl	February 27, 2026	2006
Office Etiquette	Bridget Nelson and Mary Jo Pehl	March 4, 2026	1950
The Ghost Ship	Matthew J. Elliott and Ian Potter	March 6, 2026	1943
Cinderella - A Fairy Tale by Grimm	Bridget Nelson and Mary Jo Pehl	March 10, 2026	1949
The Pearl of Death	Bridget Nelson and Mary Jo Pehl	April 17, 2026	1944
Magic Weapons for Healthy Teeth	Bridget Nelson and Mary Jo Pehl	April 28, 2026	1978
Inspector Mom: Casualty Friday	Bridget Nelson and Mary Jo Pehl	May 8, 2026	2006
A Step-Saving Kitchen	Bridget Nelson and Mary Jo Pehl	May 19, 2026	1949
What to Do on a Date	Bridget Nelson and Mary Jo Pehl	June 23, 2026	1951
Modelling Careers	Bridget Nelson and Mary Jo Pehl	July 14, 2026	1969
Circle of Friends	Bridget Nelson and Mary Jo Pehl	July 31, 2026	2006
Dragonworld: The Legend Continues	Bridget Nelson and Mary Jo Pehl	September 18, 2026	1999

=== Public-domain shorts ===
These short films are presented as pre-synchronized video files, as opposed to audio files that users must synchronize themselves.

Short	Riffers	Rifftrax released	Original release
Nestor, the Long-Eared Christmas Donkey	Michael J. Nelson	December 19, 2006	1977
Signal 30 (excerpt)	Michael J. Nelson, Kevin Murphy, and Bill Corbett	December 16, 2007	1959
A Visit to Santa	Michael J. Nelson, Kevin Murphy, and Bill Corbett	December 20, 2007	1963
Act Your Age	Michael J. Nelson, Kevin Murphy, and Bill Corbett	February 1, 2008	1949
Beginning Responsibility: Lunchroom Manners	Michael J. Nelson, Kevin Murphy, and Bill Corbett	February 22, 2008	1959
The Terrible Truth	Michael J. Nelson, Kevin Murphy, and Bill Corbett	February 28, 2008	1951
Why Doesn't Cathy Eat Breakfast? / Petaluma Chicken	Michael J. Nelson, Kevin Murphy, and Bill Corbett	March 7, 2008	1972 / 1932
Coffee House Rendezvous	Michael J. Nelson, Kevin Murphy and Bill Corbett	March 14, 2008	1969
Safety - Harm Hides at Home	Michael J. Nelson, Kevin Murphy, and Bill Corbett	March 28, 2008	1974
Are You Popular?	Michael J. Nelson, Kevin Murphy, and Bill Corbett	April 4, 2008	1947
If Mirrors Could Speak	Michael J. Nelson, Kevin Murphy, and Bill Corbett	April 11, 2008	1976
One Got Fat - Bicycle Safety	Michael J. Nelson, Kevin Murphy, and Bill Corbett	April 18, 2008	1963
Drugs Are Like That	Michael J. Nelson, Kevin Murphy, and Bill Corbett	June 17, 2008	1979
Down and Out	Michael J. Nelson, Kevin Murphy, and Bill Corbett	July 1, 2008	1971
Patriotism	Michael J. Nelson, Kevin Murphy, and Bill Corbett	July 3, 2008	1972
Skipper Learns a Lesson	Michael J. Nelson, Kevin Murphy and Bill Corbett	July 8, 2008	1952
Buying Food	Michael J. Nelson, Kevin Murphy, and Bill Corbett	July 11, 2008	1950
Right or Wrong? (Making Moral Decisions)	Michael J. Nelson, Kevin Murphy, and Bill Corbett	July 15, 2008	1951
The Trouble with Women	Michael J. Nelson, Kevin Murphy, and Bill Corbett	July 18, 2008	1959
It Must Be the Neighbors	Michael J. Nelson, Kevin Murphy and Bill Corbett	July 22, 2008	1966
Each Child Is Different	Michael J. Nelson, Kevin Murphy, and Bill Corbett	July 25, 2008	1954
Kitty Cleans Up	Michael J. Nelson, Kevin Murphy, and Bill Corbett	July 29, 2008	1949
Why Vandalism?	Michael J. Nelson, Kevin Murphy, and Bill Corbett	July 31, 2008	1955
Aqua Frolics	Michael J. Nelson, Kevin Murphy, and Bill Corbett	September 30, 2008	1950
Good Health Practices	Michael J. Nelson, Kevin Murphy, and Bill Corbett	October 24, 2008	1953
Good Eating Habits	Michael J. Nelson, Kevin Murphy, and Bill Corbett	October 31, 2008	1953
Know for Sure	Michael J. Nelson, Kevin Murphy, and Bill Corbett	November 21, 2008	1941
Christmas Toyshop	Michael J. Nelson, Kevin Murphy, and Bill Corbett	December 22, 2008	1945
Shy Guy	Michael J. Nelson, Kevin Murphy, and Bill Corbett	January 6, 2009	1947
Self Conscious Guy	Michael J. Nelson, Kevin Murphy, and Bill Corbett	January 16, 2009	1951
Overcoming Fear	Michael J. Nelson, Kevin Murphy, and Bill Corbett	January 28, 2009	1950
Playing Together	Michael J. Nelson, Kevin Murphy, and Bill Corbett	February 27, 2009	1950
How Much Affection?	Michael J. Nelson, Kevin Murphy, and Bill Corbett	March 20, 2009	1958
Your Chance to Live	Michael J. Nelson, Kevin Murphy, and Bill Corbett	March 24, 2009	1972
Understanding Your Ideals	Michael J. Nelson, Kevin Murphy, and Bill Corbett	March 28, 2009	1950
As We Like It	Michael J. Nelson, Kevin Murphy, and Bill Corbett	April 1, 2009	1952
Going Steady	Michael J. Nelson, Kevin Murphy, and Bill Corbett	April 3, 2009	1951
Carnivorous Plants	Michael J. Nelson, Kevin Murphy, and Bill Corbett	April 7, 2009	1955
You and Your Family	Michael J. Nelson, Kevin Murphy, and Bill Corbett	April 17, 2009	1946
Primary Safety: In the School Building	Michael J. Nelson, Kevin Murphy, and Bill Corbett	April 23, 2009	1955
Damaged Goods	Michael J. Nelson, Kevin Murphy, and Bill Corbett	April 29, 2009	1961
Cooking Terms	Michael J. Nelson, Kevin Murphy, and Bill Corbett	May 1, 2009	1949
What About Juvenile Delinquency	Michael J. Nelson, Kevin Murphy, and Bill Corbett	May 5, 2009	1955
Snap Out of It!	Michael J. Nelson, Kevin Murphy, and Bill Corbett	May 8, 2009	1951
Toward Emotional Maturity	Michael J. Nelson, Kevin Murphy, and Bill Corbett	May 12, 2009	1954
Alcohol Trigger Films	Michael J. Nelson, Kevin Murphy, and Bill Corbett	May 22, 2009	1979
Back to School with Joan Miller	Michael J. Nelson, Kevin Murphy, and Bill Corbett	July 14, 2009	1959
Highway Mania	Michael J. Nelson, Kevin Murphy, and Bill Corbett	July 17, 2009	1946
The Bill of Rights in Action	Michael J. Nelson, Kevin Murphy, and Bill Corbett	July 21, 2009	1968
Shake Hands with Danger	Michael J. Nelson, Kevin Murphy, and Bill Corbett	July 23, 2009	1975
Wing, Claw and Fang	Michael J. Nelson, Kevin Murphy, and Bill Corbett	July 28, 2009	1946
The Tale of Moose Baby	Michael J. Nelson, Kevin Murphy, and Bill Corbett	August 11, 2009	1975
Flying Stewardess	Michael J. Nelson, Kevin Murphy, and Bill Corbett	August 25, 2009	1940
Constance Bennett's Daily Beauty Rituals	Michael J. Nelson, Kevin Murphy, and Bill Corbett	August 28, 2009	1937
Teenagers on Trial	Michael J. Nelson, Kevin Murphy, and Bill Corbett	September 4, 2009	1955
Cork – Crashes and Curiosities	Michael J. Nelson, Kevin Murphy, and Bill Corbett	September 8, 2009	1945
What It Means to Be an American (Part 1)	Michael J. Nelson, Kevin Murphy, and Bill Corbett	September 11, 2009	1952
The Case of Tommy Tucker (Part 1)	Michael J. Nelson, Kevin Murphy, and Bill Corbett	September 15, 2009	1951
What It Means to Be an American (Part 2)	Michael J. Nelson, Kevin Murphy, and Bill Corbett	September 18, 2009	1952
The Case of Tommy Tucker (Part 2)	Michael J. Nelson, Kevin Murphy, and Bill Corbett	September 22, 2009	1951
Women in Blue	Michael J. Nelson, Kevin Murphy, and Bill Corbett	September 25, 2009	1943
A Circus Wakes Up	Michael J. Nelson, Kevin Murphy, and Bill Corbett	October 13, 2009	1950
American Thrift (Part 1)	Michael J. Nelson, Kevin Murphy, Veronica Belmont, and Bill Corbett	October 16, 2009	1962
Call It Free (Part 1)	Michael J. Nelson, Kevin Murphy, and Bill Corbett	November 10, 2009	1955
Christmas Rhapsody	Michael J. Nelson, Kevin Murphy, and Bill Corbett	December 18, 2009	1947
Rudolph the Red-Nosed Reindeer	Michael J. Nelson, Kevin Murphy, and Bill Corbett	December 21, 2009	1948
A Christmas Dream	Michael J. Nelson, Kevin Murphy and Bill Corbett	December 22, 2009	1945
The Night Before Christmas	Michael J. Nelson, Kevin Murphy, and Bill Corbett	December 24, 2009	1946
Three Magic Words	Michael J. Nelson, Kevin Murphy, and Bill Corbett	December 30, 2009	1939
Parade of Aquatic Champions	Michael J. Nelson, Kevin Murphy and Bill Corbett	January 5, 2010	1945
American Thrift (Part 2)	Michael J. Nelson, Kevin Murphy, and Bill Corbett	February 26, 2010	1962
Molly Grows Up	Michael J. Nelson, Kevin Murphy, and Bill Corbett	March 2, 2010	1953
Call It Free (Part 2)	Michael J. Nelson, Kevin Murphy and Bill Corbett	March 5, 2010	1955
Story of a Teenage Drug Addict	Michael J. Nelson, Kevin Murphy, and Bill Corbett	March 9, 2010	1951
The Following Instructions Game	Michael J. Nelson, Kevin Murphy, and Bill Corbett	March 23, 2010	1978
Little Lost Scent	Michael J. Nelson, Kevin Murphy, and Bill Corbett	March 26, 2010	1955
An Aquarium In Action	Michael J. Nelson, Kevin Murphy, and Bill Corbett	March 30, 2010	1972
Mr. Moto Takes a Walk	Michael J. Nelson, Kevin Murphy, and Bill Corbett	April 2, 2010	1965
Seat Belts: The Life Saving Habit	Michael J. Nelson, Kevin Murphy, and Bill Corbett	April 6, 2010	1986
Drawing for Beginners: The Rectangle	Michael J. Nelson, Kevin Murphy, and Bill Corbett	April 27, 2010	1949
Kittens: Birth and Growth	Michael J. Nelson, Kevin Murphy, and Bill Corbett	April 30, 2010	1958
Reading: Who Needs It?	Michael J. Nelson, Kevin Murphy, and Bill Corbett	May 4, 2010	1981
Families: Food and Eating	Michael J. Nelson, Kevin Murphy, and Bill Corbett	May 7, 2010	1976
Summer Is an Adventure	Michael J. Nelson, Kevin Murphy, and Bill Corbett	May 11, 2010	1957
Beginning Responsibility: Taking Care of Your Own Things	Michael J. Nelson, Kevin Murphy, and Bill Corbett	May 18, 2010	1977
Reading Growth: Basic Skills	Michael J. Nelson, Kevin Murphy, and Bill Corbett	May 21, 2010	1968
Geography of Your Community	Michael J. Nelson, Kevin Murphy, and Bill Corbett	May 28, 2010	1954
The Parts of Speech	Michael J. Nelson, Kevin Murphy, and Bill Corbett	June 1, 2010	1967
Watch Out for My Plant	Michael J. Nelson, Kevin Murphy and Bill Corbett	June 4, 2010	1972
Values: The Right Thing to Do	Michael J. Nelson, Kevin Murphy, and Bill Corbett	June 8, 2010	1970
Family Teamwork	Michael J. Nelson, Kevin Murphy, and Bill Corbett	June 15, 2010	1979
Pearl of the Orient	Michael J. Nelson, Kevin Murphy, and Bill Corbett	June 18, 2010	1955
Individual Differences	Michael J. Nelson, Kevin Murphy, and Bill Corbett	June 25, 2010	1950
Whatever the Weather	Michael J. Nelson, Kevin Murphy, and Bill Corbett	June 29, 2010	1967
Building Better Paragraphs	Michael J. Nelson, Kevin Murphy, and Bill Corbett	July 2, 2010	1953
Are People All the Same?	Michael J. Nelson, Kevin Murphy, and Bill Corbett	July 6, 2010	1977
Mealtime Manners and Health	Michael J. Nelson, Kevin Murphy, and Bill Corbett	July 9, 2010	1957
Things Are Different Now	Michael J. Nelson, Kevin Murphy, and Bill Corbett	July 23, 2010	1978
William's Doll	Michael J. Nelson, Kevin Murphy, and Bill Corbett	August 6, 2010	1981
Decisions Decisions	Michael J. Nelson, Kevin Murphy, and Bill Corbett	August 10, 2010	1977
Library World	Michael J. Nelson, Kevin Murphy, and Bill Corbett	August 13, 2010	1977
The Fad Diet Circus	Michael J. Nelson, Kevin Murphy, and Bill Corbett	August 16, 2010	1973
More Dangerous Than Dynamite	Michael J. Nelson, Kevin Murphy, and Bill Corbett	August 24, 2010	1941
Alone at Home	Michael J. Nelson, Kevin Murphy, and Bill Corbett	August 31, 2010	1983
Telephone for Help	Michael J. Nelson, Kevin Murphy, and Bill Corbett	September 7, 2010	1968
What If We Had a Fire?	Michael J. Nelson, Kevin Murphy, and Bill Corbett	September 14, 2010	1976
Seven Little Ducks	Michael J. Nelson, Kevin Murphy, and Bill Corbett	September 21, 2010	1967
Cops: Who Needs Them?	Michael J. Nelson, Kevin Murphy, and Bill Corbett	September 28, 2010	1973
You Can Do Something About Acne	Michael J. Nelson, Kevin Murphy, and Bill Corbett	October 5, 2010	1970
Safe Living at School	Michael J. Nelson, Kevin Murphy, and Bill Corbett	October 12, 2010	1948
Behavior of Domestic Pigs in a Semi-Natural Pig-Park	Michael J. Nelson, Kevin Murphy, and Bill Corbett	October 15, 2010	1989
Monkey See, Monkey Do: Verbs	Michael J. Nelson, Kevin Murphy, and Bill Corbett	October 19, 2010	1971
Don't Be a Bloody Idiot	Michael J. Nelson, Kevin Murphy, and Bill Corbett	October 26, 2010	1978
Magical Disappearing Money	Michael J. Nelson, Kevin Murphy, and Bill Corbett	November 2, 2010	1972
Values: Understanding Ourselves	Michael J. Nelson, Kevin Murphy, and Bill Corbett	November 9, 2010	1969
The Calendar: How to Use It	Michael J. Nelson, Kevin Murphy, and Bill Corbett	November 23, 2010	1982
Unto the Least of These	Michael J. Nelson, Kevin Murphy, and Bill Corbett	December 7, 2010	1970
Santa Claus' Punch and Judy	Michael J. Nelson, Kevin Murphy, and Bill Corbett	December 17, 2010	1948
Courtesy: A Good Eggsample	Michael J. Nelson, Kevin Murphy, and Bill Corbett	December 28, 2010	1976
The Being on Time Game	Michael J. Nelson, Kevin Murphy, and Bill Corbett	January 4, 2011	1978
Basic Job Skills: Handling Daily Problems	Michael J. Nelson, Kevin Murphy, and Bill Corbett	January 11, 2011	1976
Courtesy Counts a Lot	Michael J. Nelson, Kevin Murphy, and Bill Corbett	January 18, 2011	1976
Remember Me	Michael J. Nelson, Kevin Murphy, and Bill Corbett	February 8, 2011	1981
Walking to School	Michael J. Nelson, Kevin Murphy, and Bill Corbett	February 11, 2011	1964
Improve Your Pronunciation	Michael J. Nelson, Kevin Murphy, and Bill Corbett	February 18, 2011	1972
Basic Job Skills: Dealing With Customers	Michael J. Nelson, Kevin Murphy, and Bill Corbett	March 1, 2011	1976
The ABC of Walking Wisely	Michael J. Nelson, Kevin Murphy, and Bill Corbett	March 11, 2011	1959
Vision in the Forest	Michael J. Nelson, Kevin Murphy, and Bill Corbett	March 29, 2011	1957
A Badger's Bad Day	Michael J. Nelson, Kevin Murphy, and Bill Corbett	April 19, 2011	1959
Families: Earning and Spending	Michael J. Nelson, Kevin Murphy and Bill Corbett	April 22, 2011	1976
Kangaroos	Michael J. Nelson, Kevin Murphy, and Bill Corbett	April 26, 2011	1953
The Red Hen	Michael J. Nelson, Kevin Murphy, and Bill Corbett	April 27, 2011	1964
Tooth Truth with Harv and Marv	Michael J. Nelson, Kevin Murphy and Bill Corbett	May 3, 2011	1990
County Fair	Michael J. Nelson, Kevin Murphy, and Bill Corbett	May 6, 2011	1971
Prickly the Porcupine	Michael J. Nelson, Kevin Murphy, and Bill Corbett	May 10, 2011	1955
The Mysterious Message	Michael J. Nelson, Kevin Murphy, and Bill Corbett	June 7, 2011	1982
Beginning Responsibility: Being a Good Sport	Michael J. Nelson, Kevin Murphy, and Bill Corbett	June 14, 2011	1969
Animal Homes	Michael J. Nelson, Kevin Murphy, and Bill Corbett	June 28, 2011	1954
Beginning Responsibility: Getting Ready for School	Michael J. Nelson, Kevin Murphy, and Bill Corbett	July 1, 2011	1969
Adventures of a Chipmunk Family	Michael J. Nelson, Kevin Murphy, and Bill Corbett	July 5, 2011	1959
Billy's Helicopter Ride	Michael J. Nelson, Kevin Murphy, and Bill Corbett	July 7, 2011	1962
Paper and I	Michael J. Nelson, Kevin Murphy, and Bill Corbett	July 12, 2011	1960
Aesop's Sound Fables: Frozen Frolics	Michael J. Nelson, Kevin Murphy, and Bill Corbett	July 14, 2011	1930
At Your Fingertips: Grasses	Michael J. Nelson, Kevin Murphy, and Bill Corbett	July 22, 2011	1970
At Your Fingertips: Boxes	Michael J. Nelson, Kevin Murphy, and Bill Corbett	July 26, 2011	1970
Borrowed Power	Michael J. Nelson, Kevin Murphy, and Bill Corbett	July 29, 2011	1951
Eggs to Market	Michael J. Nelson, Kevin Murphy, and Bill Corbett	August 12, 2011	1964
A Boy of Mexico: Juan and his Donkey	Michael J. Nelson, Kevin Murphy, and Bill Corbett	August 16, 2011	1965
One Turkey, Two Turkey	Michael J. Nelson, Kevin Murphy and Bill Corbett	August 19, 2011	1971
We Discover the Dictionary	Michael J. Nelson, Kevin Murphy, and Bill Corbett	August 23, 2011	1963
What Is Nothing?	Michael J. Nelson, Kevin Murphy, and Bill Corbett	August 26, 2011	1973
Feelings: I'm Feeling Alone	Michael J. Nelson, Kevin Murphy, and Bill Corbett	September 6, 2011	1974
Setting Up a Room	Michael J. Nelson, Kevin Murphy and Bill Corbett	September 9, 2011	1967
Join Hands, Let Go!	Michael J. Nelson, Kevin Murphy, and Bill Corbett	September 13, 2011	1969
The Creeps Machine	Michael J. Nelson, Kevin Murphy, and Bill Corbett	September 16, 2011	1973
Boy of India: Rama and His Elephant	Michael J. Nelson, Kevin Murphy, and Bill Corbett	September 20, 2011	1956
What Are Letters For?	Michael J. Nelson, Kevin Murphy, and Bill Corbett	September 23, 2011	1973
Making Sense with Sentences	Michael J. Nelson, Kevin Murphy, and Bill Corbett	October 11, 2011	1975
Jobs in Cosmetology	Michael J. Nelson, Kevin Murphy, and Bill Corbett	October 25, 2011	1970
What Makes Things Float?	Michael J. Nelson, Kevin Murphy, and Bill Corbett	October 28, 2011	1951
Let's Pretend: Magic Sneakers	Michael J. Nelson, Kevin Murphy, and Bill Corbett	November 8, 2011	1969
Beginning Responsibility: Broken Bookshop	Michael J. Nelson, Kevin Murphy, and Bill Corbett	November 11, 2011	1979
Corky the Crow	Michael J. Nelson, Kevin Murphy, and Bill Corbett	December 7, 2011	1960
Reading from Now On	Michael J. Nelson, Kevin Murphy and Bill Corbett	January 3, 2012	1969
Friends	Michael J. Nelson, Kevin Murphy, and Bill Corbett	January 24, 2012	1972
The Lemonade Stand: What's Fair?	Michael J. Nelson, Kevin Murphy, and Bill Corbett	January 31, 2012	1969
The Clean Club	Michael J. Nelson, Kevin Murphy, and Bill Corbett	February 2, 2012	1990
David and Hazel: A Story in Communication	Michael J. Nelson, Kevin Murphy, and Bill Corbett	February 16, 2012	1964
Sailing a Toy Boat	Michael J. Nelson, Kevin Murphy, and Bill Corbett	March 1, 2012	1952
Alcohol	Michael J. Nelson, Kevin Murphy and Bill Corbett	March 1, 2012	1971
Cooks & Chefs	Michael J. Nelson, Kevin Murphy, and Bill Corbett	March 16, 2012	1970
Danger Keep Out!	Michael J. Nelson, Kevin Murphy, and Bill Corbett	March 18, 2012	1987
The Fish That Nearly Drowned	Michael J. Nelson, Kevin Murphy, and Bill Corbett	April 10, 2012	1966
Nutrition: The All-American Meal	Michael J. Nelson, Kevin Murphy and Bill Corbett	April 24, 2012	1976
The Toymaker	Michael J. Nelson, Kevin Murphy, and Bill Corbett	April 25, 2012	1952
Dinosaurs: The Age of the Terrible Lizard	Michael J. Nelson, Kevin Murphy, and Bill Corbett	May 3, 2012	1970
Farm Babies and Their Mothers	Michael J. Nelson, Kevin Murphy, and Bill Corbett	June 15, 2012	1954
Jimmy of the Safety Patrol	Michael J. Nelson, Kevin Murphy, and Bill Corbett	June 30, 2012	1950
Joy Ride	Michael J. Nelson, Kevin Murphy, and Bill Corbett	July 6, 2012	1976
Love That Car!	Michael J. Nelson, Kevin Murphy, and Bill Corbett	July 17, 2012	1967
The Hare and the Tortoise	Michael J. Nelson, Kevin Murphy, and Bill Corbett	October 30, 2012	1947
Get That Job!	Michael J. Nelson, Kevin Murphy, and Bill Corbett	November 28, 2012	1975
Perc! Pop! Sprinkle!	Michael J. Nelson, Kevin Murphy, and Bill Corbett	November 29, 2012	1969
Choking: To Save a Life	Michael J. Nelson, Kevin Murphy, and Bill Corbett	December 7, 2012	1976
Tic Toc Time Clock	Michael J. Nelson, Kevin Murphy, and Bill Corbett	December 11, 2012	1976
Say No to Strangers	Michael J. Nelson, Kevin Murphy, and Bill Corbett	January 29, 2013	1957
Live and Learn	Michael J. Nelson, Kevin Murphy, and Bill Corbett	February 5, 2013	1951
Safety with Animals	Michael J. Nelson, Kevin Murphy, and Bill Corbett	February 12, 2013	1961
Ten Long Minutes	Michael J. Nelson, Kevin Murphy, and Bill Corbett	February 28, 2013	1962
Ghost Rider	Michael J. Nelson, Kevin Murphy, and Bill Corbett	March 5, 2013	1982
The Other Fellow's Feelings	Michael J. Nelson, Kevin Murphy, and Bill Corbett	April 10, 2013	1951
The Day I Died	Michael J. Nelson, Kevin Murphy, and Bill Corbett	April 12, 2013	1977
Story-telling: Can You Tell It In Order?	Michael J. Nelson, Kevin Murphy, and Bill Corbett	April 30, 2013	1953
Maintaining Classroom Discipline	Michael J. Nelson, Kevin Murphy, and Bill Corbett	May 15, 2013	1947
Rescueman	Michael J. Nelson, Kevin Murphy, and Bill Corbett	May 17, 2013	1982
Goodbye, Weeds	Michael J. Nelson, Kevin Murphy, and Bill Corbett	June 6, 2013	1946
When Should Grown-Ups Stop Fights	Michael J. Nelson, Kevin Murphy, and Bill Corbett	June 20, 2013	1955
Batman and Robin Chapter 1: Batman Takes Over	Michael J. Nelson, Kevin Murphy, and Bill Corbett	July 16, 2013	1949
You're the Judge	Michael J. Nelson, Kevin Murphy, and Bill Corbett	July 23, 2013	1965
Batman and Robin Chapter 2: Tunnel of Terror	Michael J. Nelson, Kevin Murphy, and Bill Corbett	August 7, 2013	1949
Batman and Robin Chapter 3: Robin's Wild Ride	Michael J. Nelson, Kevin Murphy, and Bill Corbett	September 13, 2013	1949
Batman and Robin Chapter 4: Batman Trapped!	Michael J. Nelson, Kevin Murphy, and Bill Corbett	October 18, 2013	1949
Norman Krasner	Michael J. Nelson, Kevin Murphy, and Bill Corbett	November 6, 2013	1987
Norman Checks In	Michael J. Nelson, Kevin Murphy, and Bill Corbett	November 6, 2013	1984
Welcome Back, Norman	Michael J. Nelson, Kevin Murphy, and Bill Corbett	November 6, 2013	1979
Batman and Robin Chapter 5: Robin Rescues Batman	Michael J. Nelson, Kevin Murphy, and Bill Corbett	December 6, 2013	1949
Mr. B Natural	Michael J. Nelson, Kevin Murphy, and Bill Corbett	December 20, 2013	1957
A Trip to the Moon	Michael J. Nelson, Kevin Murphy, and Bill Corbett	December 20, 2013	1902
Batman and Robin Chapter 6: Batman: Target Robin	Michael J. Nelson, Kevin Murphy, and Bill Corbett	January 3, 2014	1949
Batman and Robin Chapter 7: Batman: The Fatal Blast	Michael J. Nelson, Kevin Murphy, and Bill Corbett	January 10, 2014	1949
Safety Woman: In Danger Out of Doors	Michael J. Nelson, Kevin Murphy, and Bill Corbett	January 31, 2014	1978
Batman and Robin Chapter 8: Robin Meets the Wizard	Michael J. Nelson, Kevin Murphy, and Bill Corbett	February 11, 2014	1949
This Is Hormel	Michael J. Nelson, Kevin Murphy, and Bill Corbett	February 28, 2014	1965
Batman and Robin Chapter 9: The Wizard Strikes Back	Michael J. Nelson, Kevin Murphy, and Bill Corbett	March 14, 2014	1949
Norman Gives a Speech	Michael J. Nelson, Kevin Murphy, and Bill Corbett	April 18, 2014	1989
How to Keep a Job	Michael J. Nelson, Kevin Murphy, and Bill Corbett	April 22, 2014	1949
Health: Your Posture	Michael J. Nelson, Kevin Murphy, and Bill Corbett	April 29, 2014	1953
Writing Better Social Letters	Michael J. Nelson, Kevin Murphy, and Bill Corbett	May 9, 2014	1950
At Your Fingertips: Cylinders	Michael J. Nelson, Kevin Murphy, and Bill Corbett	May 19, 2014	1970
Fashion Horizons	Michael J. Nelson, Kevin Murphy, and Bill Corbett	June 2, 2014	1940
Batman and Robin Chapter 10: Batman's Last Chance	Michael J. Nelson, Kevin Murphy, and Bill Corbett	June 9, 2014	1949
Color It Clean	Michael J. Nelson, Kevin Murphy, and Bill Corbett	June 13, 2014	1966
Batman and Robin Chapter 11: Robin's Ruse	Michael J. Nelson, Kevin Murphy, and Bill Corbett	June 24, 2014	1949
Read On! From Left to Right	Michael J. Nelson, Kevin Murphy, and Bill Corbett	June 30, 2014	1972
Clean and Neat with Harv and Marv	Michael J. Nelson, Kevin Murphy, and Bill Corbett	July 7, 2014	1975
Willy Whistle	Michael J. Nelson, Kevin Murphy, and Bill Corbett	July 24, 2014	1976
Batman and Robin Chapter 12: Robin Rides the Wind	Michael J. Nelson, Kevin Murphy, and Bill Corbett	August 12, 2014	1949
RiffTrax Animated Intro	Animation by Harry Partridge with music by Jonathan Coulton	August 14, 2014	2014
Flying Saucer Mystery	Michael J. Nelson, Kevin Murphy, and Bill Corbett	August 22, 2014	1950
Batman and Robin Chapter 13: The Wizard's Challenge	Michael J. Nelson, Kevin Murphy, and Bill Corbett	September 5, 2014	1949
Batman and Robin Chapter 14: Batman vs. the Wizard	Michael J. Nelson, Kevin Murphy, and Bill Corbett	September 16, 2014	1949
Batman and Robin Chapter 15: Batman Victorious	Michael J. Nelson, Kevin Murphy, and Bill Corbett	September 19, 2014	1949
Rediscovery: Puppets	Michael J. Nelson, Kevin Murphy, and Bill Corbett	September 26, 2014	1967
A Case of Spring Fever	Michael J. Nelson, Kevin Murphy, and Bill Corbett	October 24, 2014	1940
Warty, the Toad	Michael J. Nelson, Kevin Murphy, and Bill Corbett	November 7, 2014	1973
At Your Fingertips: Play Clay	Michael J. Nelson, Kevin Murphy, and Bill Corbett	November 21, 2014	1970
The Frustrating Fours and Fascinating Fives	Michael J. Nelson, Kevin Murphy, and Bill Corbett	December 12, 2014	1953
Zlateh the Goat	Michael J. Nelson, Kevin Murphy, and Bill Corbett	December 23, 2014	1973
Santa and the Fairy Snow Queen	Michael J. Nelson, Kevin Murphy, and Bill Corbett	December 30, 2014	1951
Behave, Bernard!	Michael J. Nelson, Kevin Murphy, and Bill Corbett	January 9, 2015	1983
Duck and Cover	Michael J. Nelson, Kevin Murphy, and Bill Corbett	January 16, 2015	1952
Getting Angry	Michael J. Nelson, Kevin Murphy and Bill Corbett	January 27, 2015	1966
Study Skills: Verbal Communication Made Easy	Michael J. Nelson, Kevin Murphy, and Bill Corbett	March 11, 2015	1990
Starting School	Michael J. Nelson, Kevin Murphy, and Bill Corbett	March 27, 2015	1973
With An All-star Cast	Michael J. Nelson, Kevin Murphy, and Bill Corbett	April 17, 2015	1956
The Myths of Shoplifting	Michael J. Nelson, Kevin Murphy, and Bill Corbett	May 19, 2015	1980
Life in the Suburbs	Bridget Nelson and Mary Jo Pehl	June 12, 2015	1957
A Word to the Wives	Bridget Nelson and Mary Jo Pehl	June 30, 2015	1955
Animal Antics	Michael J. Nelson, Kevin Murphy, and Bill Corbett	July 14, 2015	1937
The Relaxed Wife / Consuming Women (Women as Consumers)	Bridget Nelson and Mary Jo Pehl	July 23, 2015	1957 / 1967
Naturally... a Girl	Bridget Nelson and Mary Jo Pehl	August 7, 2015	1973
Cindy Goes to a Party	Bridget Nelson and Mary Jo Pehl	September 15, 2015	1955
The Prom: It's a Pleasure	Bridget Nelson and Mary Jo Pehl	September 28, 2015	1961
Oh Boy! Babies!	Bridget Nelson and Mary Jo Pehl	October 9, 2015	1982
The Snob	Bridget Nelson and Mary Jo Pehl	October 20, 2015	1958
Halloween Party (Live performance of short from RiffTrax Live: Anaconda)	Michael J. Nelson, Kevin Murphy, and Bill Corbett	October 29, 2015	1953
The Night That Dracula Saved the World (The Halloween That Almost Wasn't)	Michael J. Nelson, Kevin Murphy, and Bill Corbett	October 29, 2015	1979
Measuring Man (Let's Measure: Using Standard Units)	Michael J. Nelson, Kevin Murphy, and Bill Corbett	November 6, 2015	1970
A Day of Thanksgiving	Michael J. Nelson, Kevin Murphy, and Bill Corbett	November 25, 2015	1951
Dining Together	Michael J. Nelson, Kevin Murphy, and Bill Corbett	November 25, 2015	1951
Have a Mary Jo Christmas and a Bridget New Year! (Featuring an edited version of A Christmas Carol and The Little Lamb)	Bridget Nelson and Mary Jo Pehl	December 11, 2015	1952 / 1955
Marriage Is a Partnership	Bridget Nelson and Mary Jo Pehl	January 8, 2016	1951
Shapes We Live With	Michael J. Nelson, Kevin Murphy, and Bill Corbett	January 15, 2016	1963
William: From Georgia to Harlem	Michael J. Nelson, Kevin Murphy, and Bill Corbett	January 26, 2016	1971
The Litter Monster	Michael J. Nelson, Kevin Murphy, and Bill Corbett	January 29, 2016	1970
Phoebe	Bridget Nelson and Mary Jo Pehl	March 15, 2016	1964
The Tiny Astronaut	Michael J. Nelson, Kevin Murphy, and Bill Corbett	March 30, 2016	1966
Measuring Man (RiffTrax Live Edition)	Michael J. Nelson, Kevin Murphy, and Bill Corbett	March 31, 2016	1970
Social Acceptability	Bridget Nelson and Mary Jo Pehl	April 12, 2016	1957
The Value of Teamwork	Michael J. Nelson, Kevin Murphy, and Bill Corbett	April 21, 2016	1990
On Guard - Bunco!	Michael J. Nelson, Kevin Murphy, and Bill Corbett	June 7, 2016	1974
Don't Get Angry	Michael J. Nelson, Kevin Murphy, and Bill Corbett	June 24, 2016	1953
The Magic Shelf	Bridget Nelson and Mary Jo Pehl	July 5, 2016	1952
Duties of a Secretary	Bridget Nelson and Mary Jo Pehl	July 14, 2016	1947
Girls Are Better than Ever	Bridget Nelson and Mary Jo Pehl	July 29, 2016	1967
Safety as we Play	Michael J. Nelson, Kevin Murphy, and Bill Corbett	August 5, 2016	1971
Flash That Smile	Bridget Nelson and Mary Jo Pehl	September 14, 2016	1984
Peer Pressure: Nobody Tells Me What to Do!	Bridget Nelson and Mary Jo Pehl	September 29, 2016	1983
At Your Fingertips: Sugar and Spice (Live performance of short from RiffTrax Live: Santa Claus)	Michael J. Nelson, Kevin Murphy, and Bill Corbett	October 5, 2016	1970
The Second Annual Bridget and Mary Jo Christmas Special! (Featuring Carving Magic and a 1953 Christmas home movie)	Bridget Nelson and Mary Jo Pehl with guests Beth "Beez" McKeever and Kevin Murphy	December 16, 2016	1959 / 1953
The Home of the Future (1999 A.D.)	Bridget Nelson and Mary Jo Pehl	December 27, 2016	1967
Katy	Bridget Nelson and Mary Jo Pehl	January 4, 2017	1974
Measure Metric Volume 2: Doc Cranshaw and the Kid - The Contest	Michael J. Nelson, Kevin Murphy, and Bill Corbett	January 13, 2017	1976
The Maturing Woman	Bridget Nelson and Mary Jo Pehl	March 3, 2017	1977
Busy Bodies	Michael J. Nelson, Kevin Murphy, and Bill Corbett	March 29, 2017	1969
Allen Is My Brother	Michael J. Nelson, Kevin Murphy, and Bill Corbett	April 28, 2017	1957
American Look	Bridget Nelson and Mary Jo Pehl	May 10, 2017	1958
Truck Song	Michael J. Nelson, Kevin Murphy, and Bill Corbett	July 19, 2017	1988
Soapy the Germ Fighter (Live performance of short from RiffTrax Live: Mothra)	Michael J. Nelson, Kevin Murphy, and Bill Corbett	July 26, 2017	1951
Farm Family in Summer	Bridget Nelson and Mary Jo Pehl	August 30, 2017	1968
Boredom at Work	Bridget Nelson and Mary Jo Pehl	October 3, 2017	1961
Farm Family in Autumn	Bridget Nelson and Mary Jo Pehl	October 19, 2017	1967
The Babysitter	Bridget Nelson and Mary Jo Pehl	November 3, 2017	1949
The Hothead / The Forgetter	Michael J. Nelson, Kevin Murphy, and Bill Corbett	November 8, 2017	1969
Let's Talk Turkey	Bridget Nelson and Mary Jo Pehl	November 22, 2017	1955
Farm Family in Winter	Bridget Nelson and Mary Jo Pehl	November 26, 2017	1967
Gifts from the Air	Michael J. Nelson, Kevin Murphy, and Bill Corbett	December 1, 2017	1937
Santa Claus' Workshop	Michael J. Nelson, Kevin Murphy, and Bill Corbett	December 6, 2017	1950
Spunky the Snowman	Michael J. Nelson, Kevin Murphy, and Bill Corbett	December 13, 2017	1958
Christmas Customs Near and Far	Michael J. Nelson, Kevin Murphy, and Bill Corbett	December 18, 2017	1955
A Day with Fireman Bill	Michael J. Nelson, Kevin Murphy, and Bill Corbett	January 17, 2018	1958
Drawing for Beginners: The Square	Michael J. Nelson, Kevin Murphy, and Bill Corbett	January 22, 2018	1949
Harry the Dirty Dog	Bridget Nelson and Mary Jo Pehl	January 24, 2018	1991
Six Murderous Beliefs	Michael J. Nelson, Kevin Murphy, and Bill Corbett	January 26, 2018	1955
People Soup	Michael J. Nelson, Kevin Murphy, and Bill Corbett	January 29, 2018	1969
The Water We Drink	Michael J. Nelson, Kevin Murphy, and Bill Corbett	March 26, 2018	1952
Farm Family in Spring	Bridget Nelson and Mary Jo Pehl	March 28, 2018	1967
Bridget and Mary Jo: The Spring Collection (Featuring Fashion for Go Getters, Accent on Spring, and Match Your Mood)	Bridget Nelson and Mary Jo Pehl	April 6, 2018	Various
Glasses for Susan	Michael J. Nelson, Kevin Murphy, and Bill Corbett	April 30, 2018	1972
How to Be a Friend	Bridget Nelson and Mary Jo Pehl	May 23, 2018	1977
Beginning Responsibility: Learning to Follow Instructions	Michael J. Nelson, Kevin Murphy, and Bill Corbett	June 11, 2018	1968
What Mary Jo Wanted	Bridget Nelson and Mary Jo Pehl	July 6, 2018	1982
Building an Outline	Michael J. Nelson, Kevin Murphy, and Bill Corbett	September 17, 2018	1948
At Your Fingertips: Floats (Live performance of short from RiffTrax Live: The Room)	Michael J. Nelson, Kevin Murphy, and Bill Corbett	October 15, 2018	1970
Ladybug, Ladybug, Winter Is Coming	Bridget Nelson and Mary Jo Pehl	October 24, 2018	1976
Drawing for Beginners: The Triangle	Michael J. Nelson, Kevin Murphy, and Bill Corbett	November 14, 2018	1949
A Christmas Fantasy	Michael J. Nelson, Kevin Murphy, and Bill Corbett	November 23, 2018	1962
A Song for Santa	Michael J. Nelson, Kevin Murphy, and Bill Corbett	December 5, 2018	
The Shoemaker and the Elves	Michael J. Nelson, Kevin Murphy, and Bill Corbett	December 6, 2018	1960
A Christmas Carol	Michael J. Nelson, Kevin Murphy, and Bill Corbett	December 7, 2018	1959
Charlie's Christmas Secret	Bridget Nelson and Mary Jo Pehl	December 19, 2018	1984
Wonderful World of Tupperware	Bridget Nelson and Mary Jo Pehl	January 9, 2019	1959
Beginning Responsibility: Doing Things for Ourselves in School	Michael J. Nelson, Kevin Murphy, and Bill Corbett	January 11, 2019	1963
Farm Animals	Michael J. Nelson, Kevin Murphy, and Bill Corbett	January 23, 2019	1937
Jack and the Beanstalk	Michael J. Nelson, Kevin Murphy, and Bill Corbett	January 23, 2019	1953
Emergencies - What Would You Do?	Michael J. Nelson, Kevin Murphy, and Bill Corbett	March 20, 2019	1978
Tommy's Day	Michael J. Nelson, Kevin Murphy, and Bill Corbett	March 27, 2019	1946
Toes Tell / Whose Shoes?	Michael J. Nelson, Kevin Murphy, and Bill Corbett	April 3, 2019	1969 / 1969
The Boy Who Didn't Listen	Bridget Nelson and Mary Jo Pehl	April 12, 2019	1974
My Mother Was Never a Kid	Bridget Nelson and Mary Jo Pehl	May 12, 2019	1981
Play Safe (Live performance of short from RiffTrax Live: Doctor Who: The Five Doctors)	Michael J. Nelson, Kevin Murphy, and Bill Corbett	May 22, 2019	1978
What Mary Jo Shared	Bridget Nelson and Mary Jo Pehl	June 16, 2019	1981
Just Awful	Michael J. Nelson, Kevin Murphy, and Bill Corbett	July 29, 2019	1972
The Troublemaker	Bridget Nelson and Mary Jo Pehl	July 29, 2019	1959
What Is a Map?	Michael J. Nelson, Kevin Murphy, and Bill Corbett	September 10, 2019	1947
Someday	Michael J. Nelson, Kevin Murphy, and Bill Corbett	September 24, 2019	1967
What Will Bernard Do	Bridget Nelson and Mary Jo Pehl	November 22, 2019	1968
Mother Goose's Birthday Party with Ronald McDonald (Released as part of Cyber Monday 2019 Cyber Pack)	Michael J. Nelson, Kevin Murphy, and Bill Corbett	November 29, 2019	1970
Festival of Fun Days	Michael J. Nelson, Kevin Murphy, and Bill Corbett	December 18, 2019	1934
Banks: The Money Movers	Michael J. Nelson, Kevin Murphy, and Bill Corbett	December 23, 2019	1977
Squeak the Squirrel	Bridget Nelson and Mary Jo Pehl	January 21, 2020	1957
Kids Guide to the Internet	Conor Lastowka and Sean Thomason	January 29, 2020	1997
Bicycle Safety Camp	Conor Lastowka and Sean Thomason	February 12, 2020	1989
A Green Thumb for Macauley	Michael J. Nelson, Kevin Murphy, and Bill Corbett	March 14, 2020	1965
Beginning Responsibility: A Lunchroom Goes Bananas	Michael J. Nelson, Kevin Murphy, and Bill Corbett	March 24, 2020	1978
Little Red Riding-Hood	Michael J. Nelson, Kevin Murphy, and Bill Corbett	April 11, 2020	
Arranging the Buffet Supper	Bridget Nelson and Mary Jo Pehl	May 10, 2020	1946
First Aid for Children: I Can Do It Myself	Michael J. Nelson, Kevin Murphy, and Bill Corbett	May 23, 2020	1978
Appreciating Our Parents	Michael J. Nelson, Kevin Murphy, and Bill Corbett	June 21, 2020	1950
An Airplane Trip by Jet	Michael J. Nelson, Kevin Murphy, and Bridget Nelson	July 4, 2020	1961
Speak Up, Andrew!	Bridget Nelson and Mary Jo Pehl	July 21, 2020	1981
Senior Power and How to Use It! (Released early to Kickstarter 2020 supporters)	Bridget Nelson and Mary Jo Pehl	July 22, 2020	1975
Let's Give Kitty a Bath (Released early to Kickstarter 2020 supporters)	Michael J. Nelson, Kevin Murphy, and Bridget Nelson	July 22, 2020	1985
Keeping Clean and Neat	Bridget Nelson and Mary Jo Pehl	July 28, 2020	1956
Goldilocks and the Three Bears	Michael J. Nelson, Kevin Murphy, and Bill Corbett	August 11, 2020	1958
The Big Yellow Fellow	Michael J. Nelson, Kevin Murphy, and Bill Corbett	August 16, 2020	1976
My Brother Is Afraid of Just About Everything	Bridget Nelson and Mary Jo Pehl	September 4, 2020	1990
Am I Trustworthy?	Michael J. Nelson, Kevin Murphy, and Bill Corbett	October 10, 2020	1950
United States Elections: How We Vote	Michael J. Nelson, Kevin Murphy, and Bill Corbett	October 20, 2020	1965
Voting at 18	Michael J. Nelson, Kevin Murphy, and Bill Corbett	November 1, 2020	1972
The Victory Squad	Michael J. Nelson, Kevin Murphy, and Bill Corbett	November 2, 2020	1966
Tuesday in November	Michael J. Nelson, Kevin Murphy, and Bill Corbett	November 3, 2020	1945
The Munchers: A Fable	Michael J. Nelson, Kevin Murphy, and Bill Corbett	November 13, 2020	1973
Alias St. Nick	Michael J. Nelson, Kevin Murphy, and Bill Corbett	December 1, 2020	1935
December Holidays	Michael J. Nelson, Kevin Murphy, and Bill Corbett	December 9, 2020	1982
The Snowman	Michael J. Nelson, Kevin Murphy, and Bill Corbett	December 15, 2020	1933
The Blessed Midnight	Bridget Nelson and Mary Jo Pehl	December 21, 2020	1956
Santa's Space Ship	Michael J. Nelson, Kevin Murphy, and Bill Corbett	December 23, 2020	1952
In Between	Bridget Nelson and Mary Jo Pehl	January 4, 2021	
Beauty and the Bride	Bridget Nelson and Mary Jo Pehl	February 2, 2021	1953
How to Have a Moneymaking Garage Sale	Bridget Nelson and Mary Jo Pehl	March 10, 2021	1987
Fears of Children	Michael J. Nelson, Kevin Murphy, and Bill Corbett	March 12, 2021	1951
Wonder Walks	Bridget Nelson and Mary Jo Pehl	March 22, 2021	1971
Keep Off the Grass	Michael J. Nelson, Kevin Murphy, and Bill Corbett	April 20, 2021	1970
Meet Mrs. Swenson	Bridget Nelson and Mary Jo Pehl	April 13, 2021	1956
The Lady and the Rocket	Bridget Nelson and Mary Jo Pehl	April 30, 2021	1952
The Talking Car	Michael J. Nelson, Kevin Murphy, and Bill Corbett	May 14, 2021	1969
Rhythmic Ball Skills	Michael J. Nelson, Kevin Murphy, and Bill Corbett	May 21, 2021	1971
The Box	Bridget Nelson and Mary Jo Pehl	June 18, 2021	1967
Masks of Grass	Michael J. Nelson, Kevin Murphy, and Bill Corbett	June 28, 2021	1975
Manners in School	Michael J. Nelson, Kevin Murphy, and Bill Corbett	July 12, 2021	1958
The Baggs	Michael J. Nelson, Kevin Murphy, and Bill Corbett	August 30, 2021	1973
When You Grow Up	Michael J. Nelson, Kevin Murphy, and Bill Corbett	September 13, 2021	1973
Chimp the Fireman	Michael J. Nelson, Kevin Murphy, and Bill Corbett	September 22, 2021	1948
Frances and Her Rabbit	Bridget Nelson and Mary Jo Pehl	September 29, 2021	1956
Why Study Science?	Bridget Nelson and Mary Jo Pehl	October 9, 2021	1955
It's a Cat's Life	Bridget Nelson and Mary Jo Pehl	October 29, 2021	1950
Halloween Safety 2: Even Safer	Michael J. Nelson, Kevin Murphy, and Bill Corbett	October 31, 2021	1985
Basketball Is Fun	Michael J. Nelson, Kevin Murphy, and Bill Corbett	November 27, 2021	1949
The Magic Shop (Released as part of Cyber Monday 2021 Cyber Pack)	Michael J. Nelson, Kevin Murphy, and Bill Corbett	November 29, 2021	1982
The Little King: Christmas Night	Michael J. Nelson, Kevin Murphy, and Bill Corbett	December 8, 2021	1933
Christmas Cracker	Michael J. Nelson, Kevin Murphy, and Bill Corbett	December 13, 2021	1963
Toyland	Michael J. Nelson, Kevin Murphy, and Bill Corbett	December 20, 2021	1932
Silent Night: The Story of the Christmas Carol	Michael J. Nelson, Kevin Murphy, and Bill Corbett	December 24, 2021	1953
Play in the Snow	Bridget Nelson and Mary Jo Pehl	January 1, 2022	1955
The Joy of Living with Fragrance	Bridget Nelson and Mary Jo Pehl	January 10, 2022	1962
Beginning Responsibility: Taking Care of Things	Michael J. Nelson, Kevin Murphy, and Bill Corbett	January 15, 2022	1951
Ol' #23	Bridget Nelson and Mary Jo Pehl	January 22, 2022	1980
Good Grooming for Girls	Bridget Nelson and Mary Jo Pehl	February 12, 2022	1956
Holiday from Rules	Michael J. Nelson, Kevin Murphy, and Bill Corbett	February 19, 2022	1958
The Adventures of Chip and Dip	Bridget Nelson and Mary Jo Pehl	March 18, 2022	1968
Look Like a Winner: Military Etiquette and Grooming	Bridget Nelson and Mary Jo Pehl	April 4, 2022	1971
The Front Line	Bridget Nelson and Mary Jo Pehl	April 11, 2022	1965
Build Your Vocabulary	Bridget Nelson and Mary Jo Pehl	April 25, 2022	1948
Leadfoot	Michael J. Nelson, Kevin Murphy, and Bill Corbett	May 24, 2022	1982
Heroine of the Week	Bridget Nelson and Mary Jo Pehl	May 28, 2022	1960
Jack and Jill	Bridget Nelson and Mary Jo Pehl	June 7, 2022	1951
The Grapevine	Bridget Nelson and Mary Jo Pehl	June 14, 2022	1958
An Airplane Trip	Michael J. Nelson, Kevin Murphy, and Bill Corbett	June 17, 2022	1954
Are Manners Important?	Bridget Nelson and Mary Jo Pehl	June 28, 2022	1954
A Magical Field Trip to the Denver Mint	Michael J. Nelson, Kevin Murphy, and Bill Corbett	July 2, 2022	1989
Wanted: The Perfect Guy	Bridget Nelson and Mary Jo Pehl	July 8, 2022	1986
Shoplifting Prevented	Michael J. Nelson, Kevin Murphy, and Bill Corbett	July 12, 2022	1982
Last Clear Chance	Michael J. Nelson, Kevin Murphy, and Bill Corbett	August 9, 2022	1959
Adventures of Captain Marvel Chapter One: Curse of the Scorpion	Michael J. Nelson, Kevin Murphy, and Bill Corbett	August 12, 2022	1941
Bus Nut	Bridget Nelson and Mary Jo Pehl	August 20, 2022	1980
The Juggling Lesson	Conor Lastowka and Sean Thomason	August 30, 2022	1983
Chickenomics: A Fowl Approach to Economics	Conor Lastowka and Sean Thomason	September 9, 2022	1979
This is Roller Skating	Bridget Nelson and Mary Jo Pehl	September 23, 2022	c. 1950
Patterns for Smartness	Bridget Nelson and Mary Jo Pehl	October 8, 2022	1948
Skippy and the Three R's	Bridget Nelson and Mary Jo Pehl	November 11, 2022	1953
Adventures of Captain Marvel Chapter Two: The Guillotine	Michael J. Nelson, Kevin Murphy, and Bill Corbett	November 21, 2022	1941
The Christmas Deer	Michael J. Nelson, Kevin Murphy, and Bill Corbett	December 13, 2022	1958
The Christmas Tree	Michael J. Nelson, Kevin Murphy, and Bill Corbett	December 15, 2022	1975
In Winter	Bridget Nelson and Mary Jo Pehl	December 16, 2022	1967
Big Enough to Care	Bridget Nelson and Mary Jo Pehl	December 19, 2022	1953
The First Christmas Tree	Michael J. Nelson, Kevin Murphy, and Bill Corbett	December 21, 2022	1971
God's Christmas Gift	Bridget Nelson and Mary Jo Pehl	December 22, 2022	1958
It All Depends on You	Bridget Nelson and Mary Jo Pehl	January 9, 2023	1968
Toothache of the Clown	Michael J. Nelson, Kevin Murphy, and Bill Corbett	January 17, 2023	1972
Adventures of Captain Marvel Chapter Three: Time Bomb	Michael J. Nelson, Kevin Murphy, and Bill Corbett	January 27, 2023	1941
The $20 Miracle	Bridget Nelson and Mary Jo Pehl	February 7, 2023	1967
How Do You Know It's Love?	Bridget Nelson and Mary Jo Pehl	February 14, 2023	1950
The Three Wishes	Michael J. Nelson, Kevin Murphy, and Bill Corbett	February 17, 2023	1950
How to Succeed with Brunettes	Bridget Nelson and Mary Jo Pehl	March 7, 2023	1966
Gumby: Baker's Tour and Concerto	Michael J. Nelson, Kevin Murphy, and Bill Corbett	March 18, 2023	1957
Safety in Offices	Michael J. Nelson, Kevin Murphy, and Bill Corbett	April 8, 2023	1944
Adventures of Captain Marvel Chapter Four: Death Takes the Wheel	Michael J. Nelson, Kevin Murphy, and Bill Corbett	May 23, 2023	1941
City Pets: Fun and Responsibility	Bridget Nelson and Mary Jo Pehl	May 26, 2023	1953
The Color of Health	Michael J. Nelson, Kevin Murphy, and Bill Corbett	June 27, 2023	1960
The Tale of Baby Moose	Michael J. Nelson, Kevin Murphy, and Bill Corbett	July 11, 2023	1975
Life in a Medieval Town	Michael J. Nelson, Kevin Murphy, and Bill Corbett	July 21, 2023	1965
Adventures of Captain Marvel Chapter Five: The Scorpion Strikes	Michael J. Nelson, Kevin Murphy, and Bill Corbett	August 1, 2023	1941
Let's Be Good Citizens at Play	Michael J. Nelson, Kevin Murphy, and Bill Corbett	August 8, 2023	1953
School Vandalism	Michael J. Nelson, Kevin Murphy, and Bill Corbett	August 19, 2023	1972
The Number System	Michael J. Nelson, Kevin Murphy, and Bill Corbett	August 22, 2023	1952
Stoned	Bridget Nelson and Mary Jo Pehl	August 25, 2023	1980
How Animals Help Us	Bridget Nelson and Mary Jo Pehl	September 2, 2023	1954
Answering the Child's Why?	Bridget Nelson and Mary Jo Pehl	September 12, 2023	1951
Do Words Ever Fool You?	Michael J. Nelson, Kevin Murphy, and Bill Corbett	September 16, 2023	1948
Don't Be Afraid	Michael J. Nelson, Kevin Murphy, and Bill Corbett	October 24, 2023	1953
Adventures of Captain Marvel Chapter Six: Lens of Death	Michael J. Nelson, Kevin Murphy, and Bill Corbett	November 6, 2023	1941
A Conservation Carol	Michael J. Nelson, Kevin Murphy, and Bill Corbett	December 5, 2023	1979
The Christmas Spirit	Michael J. Nelson, Kevin Murphy, and Bill Corbett	December 8, 2023	1956
A Present for Santa Claus	Michael J. Nelson, Kevin Murphy, and Bill Corbett	December 11, 2023	1947
The Super Mario Bros. Super Show!: Koopa Klaus	Conor Lastowka and Sean Thomason	December 13, 2023	1989
A Good Tree	Bridget Nelson and Mary Jo Pehl	December 19, 2023	1984
Santa and the Three Bears	Bridget Nelson and Mary Jo Pehl	December 22, 2023	1970
The Little Match Girl	Michael J. Nelson, Kevin Murphy, and Bill Corbett	December 23, 2023	1954
Hansel and Gretel	Michael J. Nelson, Kevin Murphy, and Bill Corbett	December 29, 2023	1966
Steamboat Willie	Michael J. Nelson, Kevin Murphy, and Bill Corbett	January 17, 2024	1928
Everyday Courtesy	Bridget Nelson and Mary Jo Pehl	January 30, 2024	1967
The Fun of Making Friends	Michael J. Nelson, Kevin Murphy, and Bill Corbett	February 13, 2024	1950
Are You Listening?	Bridget Nelson and Mary Jo Pehl	February 16, 2024	1971
Gumby: The Glob and The Groobee	Michael J. Nelson, Kevin Murphy, and Bill Corbett	April 13, 2024	1960
Adventures of Captain Marvel Chapter Seven: Human Targets	Michael J. Nelson, Kevin Murphy, and Bill Corbett	April 23, 2024	1941
Stay Alive in '75 (Released May 24, 2024 to Kickstarter 2024 supporters)	Bridget Nelson and Mary Jo Pehl	May 24, 2024	1975
Danny's Dental Date	Michael J. Nelson, Kevin Murphy, and Bill Corbett	June 4, 2024	1949
The Skating Rink	Michael J. Nelson, Kevin Murphy, and Bill Corbett	June 15, 2024	1975
Feelings	Michael J. Nelson, Kevin Murphy, and Bill Corbett	June 25, 2024	1975
Fishing Vagabonds	Michael J. Nelson, Kevin Murphy, and Bill Corbett	July 3, 2024	1955
All the Kids Do It	Bridget Nelson and Mary Jo Pehl	July 5, 2024	1984
Stay Alive in '75 (Released May 24, 2024 to Kickstarter 2024 supporters)	Bridget Nelson and Mary Jo Pehl	July 20, 2024	1975
Superjock (Released May 24, 2024 to Kickstarter 2024 supporters)	Michael J. Nelson, Kevin Murphy, and Bill Corbett	August 6, 2024	1978
Police Dog	Michael J. Nelson, Kevin Murphy, and Bill Corbett	August 31, 2024	1972
The Wizard of No	Bridget Nelson and Mary Jo Pehl	September 10, 2024	1984
Safely Walk to School	Michael J. Nelson, Kevin Murphy, and Bill Corbett	September 20, 2024	1983
Student Court	Bridget Nelson and Mary Jo Pehl	September 24, 2024	1985
Trick or Treat	Michael J. Nelson, Kevin Murphy, and Bill Corbett	October 12, 2024	1969
Introducing Video Toaster 4000	Conor Lastowka and Sean Thomason	October 29, 2024	1993
Adventures of Captain Marvel Chapter Eight: Boomerang	Michael J. Nelson, Kevin Murphy, and Bill Corbett	November 9, 2024	1941
Molly's Pilgrim	Michael J. Nelson, Kevin Murphy, and Bill Corbett	November 26, 2024	1985
A Christmas Journey	Michael J. Nelson, Kevin Murphy, and Bill Corbett	December 3, 2024	1959
Sherlock Holmes in The Case of the Christmas Pudding	Michael J. Nelson, Kevin Murphy, and Bill Corbett	December 9, 2024	1955
Christmas Every Day	Michael J. Nelson, Kevin Murphy, and Bill Corbett	December 11, 2024	1986
The Santa Claus Suit	Michael J. Nelson, Kevin Murphy, and Bill Corbett	December 16, 2024	1954
Crossroads: Our First Christmas Tree	Michael J. Nelson, Kevin Murphy, and Bill Corbett	December 18, 2024	1956
A Cosmic Christmas	Michael J. Nelson, Kevin Murphy, and Bill Corbett	December 20, 2024	1977
A United Nations Christmas	Michael J. Nelson, Kevin Murphy, and Bill Corbett	December 23, 2024	1958
Let's Be Good Citizens While Visiting	Michael J. Nelson, Kevin Murphy, and Bill Corbett	January 10, 2025	1954
Bicycle Dancin'	Michael J. Nelson, Kevin Murphy, and Bill Corbett	January 14, 2025	1985
It's Your Accident	Michael J. Nelson, Kevin Murphy, and Bill Corbett	January 28, 2025	1969
Crime - Senior Alert	Bridget Nelson and Mary Jo Pehl	February 11, 2025	1978
Acting Is Fun	Bridget Nelson and Mary Jo Pehl	February 25, 2025	1953
Adventures of Captain Marvel Chapter Nine: Dead Man's Trap	Michael J. Nelson, Kevin Murphy, and Bill Corbett	March 11, 2025	1941
Telezonia	Bridget Nelson and Mary Jo Pehl	April 12, 2025	1974
Americans at Work: Barbers & Beauticians	Michael J. Nelson, Kevin Murphy, and Bill Corbett	May 2, 2025	1969
The Griper	Bridget Nelson and Mary Jo Pehl	May 20, 2025	1954
Total Electric Home	Bridget Nelson and Mary Jo Pehl	August 8, 2025	1959
Skaterdater	Michael J. Nelson, Kevin Murphy, and Bill Corbett	August 15, 2025	1965
When Sally Fell	Bridget Nelson and Mary Jo Pehl	August 27, 2025	1962
Dick Wakes Up	Michael J. Nelson, Kevin Murphy, and Bill Corbett	September 9, 2025	1954
The Remarkable Riderless Runaway Tricycle	Michael J. Nelson, Kevin Murphy, and Bill Corbett	September 16, 2025	1982
The Good Loser	Michael J. Nelson, Kevin Murphy, and Bill Corbett	September 23, 2025	1953
Young Man's Fancy	Bridget Nelson and Mary Jo Pehl	September 30, 2025	1952
Taking Care of Your School Building	Michael J. Nelson, Kevin Murphy, and Bill Corbett	October 11, 2025	1979
The Gossip	Bridget Nelson and Mary Jo Pehl	October 15, 2025	1955
Adventures of Captain Marvel Chapter Ten: Doom Ship	Michael J. Nelson, Kevin Murphy, and Bill Corbett	October 21, 2025	1941
Playground Spirits	Michael J. Nelson, Kevin Murphy, and Bill Corbett	October 29, 2025	1972
The Christmas Bus	Michael J. Nelson, Kevin Murphy, and Bill Corbett	December 2, 2025	1972
Vincent Price's The Christmas Carol	Michael J. Nelson, Kevin Murphy, and Bill Corbett	December 10, 2025	1949
Christmas Lace	Michael J. Nelson, Kevin Murphy, and Bill Corbett	December 16, 2025	1978
The Spirit of Christmas	Michael J. Nelson, Kevin Murphy, and Bill Corbett	December 22, 2025	1952
Glen Wakes Up	Michael J. Nelson, Kevin Murphy, and Bill Corbett	January 6, 2026	1950
Rumpelstiltskin	Bridget Nelson and Mary Jo Pehl	January 27, 2026	1966
I Am My Own Career: Provider	Michael J. Nelson, Kevin Murphy, and Bill Corbett	January 29, 2026	1976
Parents: Who Needs Them?	Michael J. Nelson, Kevin Murphy, and Bill Corbett	February 24, 2026	1973
Office Etiquette	Bridget Nelson and Mary Jo Pehl	March 4, 2026	1950
Cinderella - A Fairy Tale by Grimm	Bridget Nelson and Mary Jo Pehl	March 10, 2026	1949
Courtesy for Beginners	Michael J. Nelson, Kevin Murphy, and Bill Corbett	March 20, 2026	1952
How Light Helps Us	Michael J. Nelson, Kevin Murphy, and Bill Corbett	March 31, 2026	1972
Magic Weapons for Healthy Teeth	Bridget Nelson and Mary Jo Pehl	April 28, 2026	1978
The Glug	Michael J. Nelson, Kevin Murphy, and Bill Corbett	May 12, 2026	1981
Adventures of Captain Marvel Chapter Eleven: Valley of Death	Michael J. Nelson, Kevin Murphy, and Bill Corbett	May 15, 2026	1941
A Step-Saving Kitchen	Bridget Nelson and Mary Jo Pehl	May 19, 2026	1949
Water Safety: An Introduction	Michael J. Nelson, Kevin Murphy, and Bill Corbett	May 22, 2026	1974
Your Friend, the Doctor	Michael J. Nelson, Kevin Murphy, and Bill Corbett	May 29, 2026	1950
A Talent for Tony	Michael J. Nelson, Kevin Murphy, and Bill Corbett	June 5, 2026	1971
Skateboard Safety	Michael J. Nelson, Kevin Murphy, and Bill Corbett	June 15, 2026	1978
What to Do on a Date	Bridget Nelson and Mary Jo Pehl	June 23, 2026	1951
Office Safety: The Thrill Seekers	Michael J. Nelson, Kevin Murphy, and Bill Corbett	June 26, 2026	1983
Modelling Careers	Bridget Nelson and Mary Jo Pehl	July 14, 2026	1969
Boy with a Knife	Michael J. Nelson, Kevin Murphy, and Bill Corbett	July 25, 2026	1955
Adventures of Captain Marvel Chapter Twelve: Captain Marvel's Secret	Michael J. Nelson, Kevin Murphy, and Bill Corbett	September 22, 2026	1941

=== Original content shorts ===
These short films are original RiffTrax content, presented as pre-synchronized video files.

Short	Featuring	Rifftrax released
Fishin' with RiffTrax	Michael J. Nelson, Kevin Murphy and Bill Corbett	March 21, 2021
How to Be Courteous to Mary Jo	Bridget Nelson and Mary Jo Pehl	November 23, 2022
RiffTrax Goes to Golden Corral	Michael J. Nelson, Kevin Murphy and Bill Corbett	February 12, 2024
Golfin' with RiffTrax	Michael J. Nelson, Kevin Murphy and Bill Corbett	February 4, 2025

=== Full-length VOD films ===
These movies are presented as pre-synchronized video files, as opposed to audio files that users must synchronize themselves.

Titles in bold are no longer available.

Movie	Riffer(s)	RiffTrax released	Original release
The Three Stooges in Color	Film hosted by Michael J. Nelson, Kevin Murphy and Bill Corbett	April 26, 2005	Various
The Three Stooges' Greatest Routines	Film hosted by Michael J. Nelson and Kevin Murphy	November 16, 2007	Various
Swing Parade	Michael J. Nelson	December 3, 2007	1946
Reefer Madness	Michael J. Nelson	April 20, 2004	1936
Battlefield Earth	Michael J. Nelson, Kevin Murphy and Bill Corbett	January 28, 2007	2000
Troll 2	Michael J. Nelson and Richard "Lowtax" Kyanka	February 2, 2007	1992
The Little Shop of Horrors	Michael J. Nelson	December 3, 2007	1960
Night of the Living Dead	Michael J. Nelson	December 3, 2007	1968
Carnival of Souls	Michael J. Nelson	December 3, 2007	1962
House on Haunted Hill	Michael J. Nelson	December 3, 2007	1959
Plan 9 from Outer Space	Michael J. Nelson	December 3, 2007	1959
Missile to the Moon	Michael J. Nelson and Fred Willard	December 4, 2007	1958
The Star Wars Holiday Special	Michael J. Nelson, Kevin Murphy and Bill Corbett	December 20, 2007	1978
Plan 9 from Outer Space (Three Riffer Edition)	Michael J. Nelson, Kevin Murphy and Bill Corbett	January 22, 2008	1959
Forbidden Zone	Film only	July 15, 2008	1982
The Incredible Hulk: Final Round	Michael J. Nelson, Kevin Murphy and Bill Corbett	December 5, 2008	1978
Reefer Madness (Three Riffer Edition)	Michael J. Nelson, Kevin Murphy and Bill Corbett	January 20, 2009	1936
The Little Shop of Horrors (Three Riffer Edition)	Michael J. Nelson, Kevin Murphy and Bill Corbett	January 28, 2009	1960
House on Haunted Hill (Three Riffer Edition)	Michael J. Nelson, Kevin Murphy and Bill Corbett	February 4, 2009	1959
Night of the Living Dead (Three Riffer Edition)	Michael J. Nelson, Kevin Murphy and Bill Corbett	February 10, 2009	1968
Missile to the Moon (Three Riffer Edition)	Michael J. Nelson, Kevin Murphy and Bill Corbett	February 17, 2009	1958
Carnival of Souls (Three Riffer Edition)	Michael J. Nelson, Kevin Murphy and Bill Corbett	March 3, 2009	1962
Swing Parade (Three Riffer Edition)	Michael J. Nelson, Kevin Murphy and Bill Corbett	March 10, 2009	1946
Planet of Dinosaurs	Michael J. Nelson, Kevin Murphy and Bill Corbett	May 20, 2009	1978
Voodoo Man	Michael J. Nelson, Kevin Murphy and Bill Corbett	June 10, 2009	1944
Red Dawn	Michael J. Nelson and Joel McHale	July 2, 2009	1984
D-War	Michael J. Nelson, Kevin Murphy and Bill Corbett	October 5, 2009	2007
Maniac	Michael J. Nelson, Kevin Murphy and Bill Corbett	November 25, 2009	1934
RiffTrax Live: Plan 9 from Outer Space	Michael J. Nelson, Kevin Murphy and Bill Corbett with guest Jonathan Coulton and host Veronica Belmont	December 10, 2009	1959
RiffTrax Live: Christmas Shorts-stravaganza!	Michael J. Nelson, Kevin Murphy and Bill Corbett with guest riffer "Weird Al" Yankovic	March 17, 2010	Various
The Boy in the Plastic Bubble	Michael J. Nelson, Kevin Murphy and Bill Corbett	July 30, 2010	1976
Santa and the Ice Cream Bunny (Thumbelina insert)	Michael J. Nelson, Kevin Murphy and Bill Corbett	December 16, 2010	1972
RiffTrax Live: Reefer Madness	Michael J. Nelson, Kevin Murphy and Bill Corbett	May 17, 2011	1936
RiffTrax Live: House on Haunted Hill	Michael J. Nelson, Kevin Murphy and Bill Corbett with guest riffer Paul F. Tompkins	May 17, 2011	1959
The Crater Lake Monster	Michael J. Nelson, Kevin Murphy and Bill Corbett	May 24, 2011	1977
The Devil's Hand	Michael J. Nelson, Kevin Murphy and Bill Corbett	June 1, 2011	1962
The Galaxy Invader	Michael J. Nelson, Kevin Murphy and Bill Corbett	August 5, 2011	1985
Abraxas, Guardian of the Universe	Michael J. Nelson, Kevin Murphy and Bill Corbett	August 30, 2011	1990
Laser Mission	Michael J. Nelson, Kevin Murphy and Bill Corbett	October 4, 2011	1989
The Sons of Hercules: The Land of Darkness	Michael J. Nelson, Kevin Murphy and Bill Corbett	November 1, 2011	1964
Warriors of the Wasteland	Michael J. Nelson, Kevin Murphy and Bill Corbett	November 15, 2011	1983
Buffalo Rider	Michael J. Nelson, Kevin Murphy and Bill Corbett	November 22, 2011	1977
Christmas with Rifftrax (The Shanty Where Santy Claus Lives and Magic Christmas Tree)	Michael J. Nelson, Kevin Murphy and Bill Corbett	December 20, 2011	1933 / 1964
Ghosthouse	Michael J. Nelson, Kevin Murphy and Bill Corbett	January 20, 2012	1988
Frankenstein Island	Michael J. Nelson, Kevin Murphy and Bill Corbett	March 23, 2012	1981
Mesa of Lost Women	Michael J. Nelson, Kevin Murphy and Bill Corbett	April 3, 2012	1953
Curse of Bigfoot	Michael J. Nelson, Kevin Murphy and Bill Corbett	April 17, 2012	1976
RiffTrax Live: Jack the Giant Killer	Michael J. Nelson, Kevin Murphy and Bill Corbett	May 1, 2012	1962
Mutant	Michael J. Nelson, Kevin Murphy and Bill Corbett	May 8, 2012	1984
Prisoners of the Lost Universe	Michael J. Nelson, Kevin Murphy and Bill Corbett	May 22, 2012	1983
The Brainiac	Michael J. Nelson, Kevin Murphy and Bill Corbett	July 2, 2012	1962
Bloody Pit of Horror	Michael J. Nelson, Kevin Murphy and Bill Corbett	July 12, 2012	1965
Future Force	Michael J. Nelson, Kevin Murphy and Bill Corbett	July 27, 2012	1989
Neutron the Atomic Superman vs. the Death Robots	Michael J. Nelson, Kevin Murphy and Bill Corbett	August 7, 2012	1962
The Revenge of Doctor X	Michael J. Nelson, Kevin Murphy and Bill Corbett	August 21, 2012	1970
The Bermuda Triangle	Michael J. Nelson, Kevin Murphy and Bill Corbett	September 6, 2012	1978
The Guy from Harlem	Michael J. Nelson, Kevin Murphy and Bill Corbett	October 4, 2012	1976
Future Zone	Michael J. Nelson, Kevin Murphy and Bill Corbett	October 11, 2012	1990
Nightmare at Noon	Michael J. Nelson, Kevin Murphy and Bill Corbett	October 23, 2012	1988
Tourist Trap	Michael J. Nelson, Kevin Murphy and Bill Corbett	November 21, 2012	1979
Christmas with Rifftrax: Santa's Village of Madness (Santa's Enchanted Village/Santa Claus and His Helpers/Santa's Magic Kingdom)	Michael J. Nelson, Kevin Murphy and Bill Corbett	December 21, 2012	1964/1966
McBain	Michael J. Nelson, Kevin Murphy and Bill Corbett	January 25, 2013	1991
RiffTrax Live: Birdemic: Shock and Terror	Michael J. Nelson, Kevin Murphy and Bill Corbett	January 31, 2013	2008
When a Stranger Calls Back	Michael J. Nelson, Kevin Murphy and Bill Corbett	February 7, 2013	1993
Cool as Ice	Michael J. Nelson, Kevin Murphy and Bill Corbett	February 19, 2013	1991
Breaker! Breaker!	Michael J. Nelson, Kevin Murphy and Bill Corbett	March 21, 2013	1977
RiffTrax Presents: Horror Express	Matthew J. Elliott	March 28, 2013	1972
Viva Knievel!	Michael J. Nelson, Kevin Murphy and Bill Corbett	April 5, 2013	1977
The Apple	Michael J. Nelson, Kevin Murphy and Bill Corbett	April 16, 2013	1980
Kingdom of the Spiders	Michael J. Nelson, Kevin Murphy and Bill Corbett	April 23, 2013	1977
Psycho II	Michael J. Nelson, Kevin Murphy and Bill Corbett	May 7, 2013	1983
Dr. Who and the Daleks	Michael J. Nelson, Kevin Murphy and Bill Corbett	May 23, 2013	1965
Night of the Shorts: SF Sketchfest 2013	Michael J. Nelson, Kevin Murphy and Bill Corbett with guest riffers Cole Stratton, Janet Varney, Kevin McDonald, Adam Savage, Kristen Schaal and Paul F. Tompkins	May 30, 2013	Various
Firehead	Michael J. Nelson, Kevin Murphy and Bill Corbett	June 14, 2013	1991
Fangs of the Living Dead	Michael J. Nelson, Kevin Murphy and Bill Corbett	June 26, 2013	1969
Silent Rage	Michael J. Nelson, Kevin Murphy and Bill Corbett	September 6, 2013	1982
RiffTrax Live: Manos: The Hands of Fate	Michael J. Nelson, Kevin Murphy and Bill Corbett	September 20, 2013	1966
Best of RiffTrax: Villains	Michael J. Nelson, Kevin Murphy and Bill Corbett	September 27, 2013	Various
RiffTrax Special: 90s Cyber Thrillers	Michael J. Nelson, Kevin Murphy and Bill Corbett	September 27, 2013	Various
Supersonic Man	Michael J. Nelson, Kevin Murphy and Bill Corbett	October 11, 2013	1979
Swamp of the Ravens	Michael J. Nelson, Kevin Murphy and Bill Corbett	November 20, 2013	1974
Dr. Who: Daleks - Invasion Earth: 2150 A.D.	Michael J. Nelson, Kevin Murphy and Bill Corbett	December 13, 2013	1965 in UK, 1966 in United States
Treasure of the Amazon	Michael J. Nelson, Kevin Murphy and Bill Corbett	December 27, 2013	1985
RiffTrax Presents: King of Kong Island	Matthew J. Elliott and Ian Potter	January 28, 2014	1968
Night of the Lepus	Michael J. Nelson, Kevin Murphy and Bill Corbett	February 7, 2014	1972
RiffTrax Live: Night of the Living Dead	Michael J. Nelson, Kevin Murphy and Bill Corbett	February 21, 2014	1968
Cyborg Cop II	Michael J. Nelson, Kevin Murphy and Bill Corbett	March 7, 2014	1994
Super Mario Bros.	Michael J. Nelson, Kevin Murphy and Bill Corbett	March 21, 2014	1993
Terror at Tenkiller	Michael J. Nelson, Kevin Murphy and Bill Corbett	March 28, 2014	1986
Total Riff Off Episode 1: Killer Shrimp N' Friends	Michael J. Nelson, Kevin Murphy and Bill Corbett	April 2, 2014	Various
Total Riff Off Episode 2: Demon Bat	Michael J. Nelson, Kevin Murphy and Bill Corbett	April 2, 2014	2011
Total Riff Off Episode 3: Guy and a Goose	Michael J. Nelson, Kevin Murphy and Bill Corbett	April 2, 2014	Various
Fist of Fury	Michael J. Nelson, Kevin Murphy and Bill Corbett	April 11, 2014	1972
Sisters of Death	Michael J. Nelson, Kevin Murphy and Bill Corbett	April 25, 2014	1976
Attack of the Puppet People	Michael J. Nelson, Kevin Murphy and Bill Corbett	May 1, 2014	1958
City of the Dead	Michael J. Nelson, Kevin Murphy and Bill Corbett	May 16, 2014	1960
Zindy the Swamp Boy	Michael J. Nelson, Kevin Murphy and Bill Corbett	May 30, 2014	1973
The Bride and the Beast	Michael J. Nelson, Kevin Murphy and Bill Corbett	June 6, 2014	1958
Jack the Giant Killer	Michael J. Nelson, Kevin Murphy and Bill Corbett	June 20, 2014	1962
Yambaó	Michael J. Nelson, Kevin Murphy and Bill Corbett	June 27, 2014	1957
The Last Slumber Party	Michael J. Nelson, Kevin Murphy and Bill Corbett	July 18, 2014	1988
RiffTrax Live: Santa Claus Conquers the Martians	Michael J. Nelson, Kevin Murphy and Bill Corbett	August 1, 2014	1964
RiffTrax Presents: Scared to Death	Matthew J. Elliot and Ian Potter	August 4, 2014	1947
Beast of the Yellow Night	Michael J. Nelson, Kevin Murphy and Bill Corbett	August 8, 2014	1971
Dinosaurus!	Michael J. Nelson, Kevin Murphy and Bill Corbett	August 28, 2014	1960
The Sword and the Sorcerer	Michael J. Nelson, Kevin Murphy and Bill Corbett	September 12, 2014	1982
R.O.T.O.R.	Michael J. Nelson, Kevin Murphy and Bill Corbett	October 3, 2014	1989
Hawk the Slayer	Michael J. Nelson, Kevin Murphy and Bill Corbett	October 7, 2014	1980
Fun in Balloon Land	Michael J. Nelson, Kevin Murphy and Bill Corbett	November 24, 2014	1965
Total Riff Off Episode 4: Man v. Monster	Michael J. Nelson, Kevin Murphy and Bill Corbett		2012
Total Riff Off Episode 5: Animals Behaving Badly	Michael J. Nelson, Kevin Murphy and Bill Corbett	December 17, 2014	2013
Wonder Women	Michael J. Nelson, Kevin Murphy and Bill Corbett	January 2, 2015	1974
The Dark Power	Michael J. Nelson, Kevin Murphy and Bill Corbett	January 23, 2015	1987
Kiss of the Tarantula	Michael J. Nelson, Kevin Murphy and Bill Corbett	January 30, 2015	1976
Alien Outlaw	Michael J. Nelson, Kevin Murphy and Bill Corbett	February 6, 2015	1985
RiffTrax Live: Sharknado	Michael J. Nelson, Kevin Murphy and Bill Corbett	February 18, 2015	2013
Night of the Shorts: SF Sketchfest 2015	Michael J. Nelson, Kevin Murphy and Bill Corbett with guest riffers Todd Barry, John Hodgman, Paul F. Tompkins, Cole Stratton and Janet Varney	March 6, 2015	Various
The Hideous Sun Demon	Michael J. Nelson, Kevin Murphy and Bill Corbett	March 20, 2015	1958
RiffTrax Live: Santa Claus	Michael J. Nelson, Kevin Murphy and Bill Corbett	April 3, 2015	1959
The Incredible 2-Headed Transplant	Michael J. Nelson, Kevin Murphy and Bill Corbett	April 10, 2015	1971
Radical Jack	Michael J. Nelson, Kevin Murphy and Bill Corbett	April 24, 2015	2000
To Catch a Yeti	Michael J. Nelson, Kevin Murphy and Bill Corbett	May 1, 2015	1995
RiffTrax Presents: Warning from Space	Matthew J. Elliott and Ian Potter	May 15, 2015	1956 in Japan, 1963 in USA
Rock 'n' Roll Nightmare	Michael J. Nelson, Kevin Murphy and Bill Corbett	June 6, 2015	1987
RiffTrax Presents: Dreamscape	Cole Stratton and Janet Varney	June 19, 2015	1984
Fever Lake	Michael J. Nelson, Kevin Murphy and Bill Corbett	June 26, 2015	1996
Stone Cold	Michael J. Nelson, Kevin Murphy and Bill Corbett	July 9, 2015	1991
Julie and Jack	Michael J. Nelson, Kevin Murphy and Bill Corbett	July 17, 2015	2003
**Megaforce**	Michael J. Nelson, Kevin Murphy and Bill Corbett	July 31, 2015	1982
The Magic Sword	Michael J. Nelson, Kevin Murphy and Bill Corbett	August 14, 2015	1962
Rollergator	Michael J. Nelson, Kevin Murphy and Bill Corbett	August 21, 2015	1996
Birdemic: Shock and Terror	Michael J. Nelson, Kevin Murphy and Bill Corbett	August 28, 2015	2008
Manos: The Hands of Fate	Michael J. Nelson, Kevin Murphy and Bill Corbett	September 11, 2015	1966
RiffTrax Live: Sharknado 2	Michael J. Nelson, Kevin Murphy and Bill Corbett	September 17, 2015	2014
Death Promise	Michael J. Nelson, Kevin Murphy and Bill Corbett	September 25, 2015	1977
No Retreat, No Surrender	Michael J. Nelson, Kevin Murphy and Bill Corbett	October 16, 2015	1986
Total Riff Off Episode 6: Brazilian Bigfoot	Michael J. Nelson, Kevin Murphy and Bill Corbett	November 13, 2015	2012
The Wizard	Michael J. Nelson, Kevin Murphy and Bill Corbett	November 20, 2015	1989
RiffTrax Live: Miami Connection	Michael J. Nelson, Kevin Murphy and Bill Corbett	December 1, 2015	1987
I Believe in Santa Claus	Michael J. Nelson, Kevin Murphy and Bill Corbett	December 22, 2015	1984
Icebreaker	Michael J. Nelson, Kevin Murphy and Bill Corbett	January 22, 2016	2000
RiffTrax Live: Santa and the Ice Cream Bunny (Jack and the Beanstalk insert)	Michael J. Nelson, Kevin Murphy and Bill Corbett	March 4, 2016	1972
Wizards of the Lost Kingdom	Michael J. Nelson, Kevin Murphy and Bill Corbett	March 11, 2016	1985
RiffTrax Presents: Flight to Mars	Matthew J. Elliott and Ian Potter	March 18, 2016	1951
Samurai Cop	Michael J. Nelson, Kevin Murphy and Bill Corbett	March 25, 2016	1991
Night of the Shorts: SF Sketchfest 2016	Michael J. Nelson, Kevin Murphy and Bill Corbett with guest riffers Adam Savage, John Hodgman, Paul F. Tompkins, Bridget Nelson, Mary Jo Pehl, Cole Stratton and Janet Varney	April 4, 2016	Various
Cyber Tracker	Michael J. Nelson, Kevin Murphy and Bill Corbett	April 8, 2016	1994
RiffTrax Presents: Cat-Women of the Moon	Bridget Nelson and Mary Jo Pehl	April 15, 2016	1953
Arachnia	Michael J. Nelson, Kevin Murphy and Bill Corbett	May 13, 2016	2003
Hillbillys in a Haunted House	Michael J. Nelson, Kevin Murphy and Bill Corbett	May 20, 2016	1967
The Last Shark	Michael J. Nelson, Kevin Murphy and Bill Corbett	June 17, 2016	1981
RiffTrax Live: Time Chasers	Michael J. Nelson, Kevin Murphy and Bill Corbett	July 8, 2016	1994
Attack from Space	Michael J. Nelson, Kevin Murphy and Bill Corbett	July 22, 2016	1964
Ruby	Michael J. Nelson, Kevin Murphy and Bill Corbett	August 19, 2016	1977
RiffTrax Live: MST3K Reunion Show	Michael J. Nelson, Kevin Murphy and Bill Corbett with guest riffers Bridget Nelson, Mary Jo Pehl, Trace Beaulieu, Frank Conniff, Jonah Ray and Joel Hodgson	September 23, 2016	Various
Astro-Zombies	Michael J. Nelson, Kevin Murphy and Bill Corbett	October 11, 2016	1968
Honor and Glory	Michael J. Nelson, Kevin Murphy and Bill Corbett	November 4, 2016	1991
Deadly Prey	Michael J. Nelson, Kevin Murphy and Bill Corbett	December 2, 2016	1986
Superargo and the Faceless Giants	Michael J. Nelson, Kevin Murphy and Bill Corbett	December 9, 2016	1968
RiffTrax Christmas Circus with Whizzo the Clown! (featuring Santa's Christmas Circus and The Christmas Tree)	Michael J. Nelson, Kevin Murphy and Bill Corbett	December 22, 2016	1966 / 1975
Rifftrax Presents: The Amazing Mr. X	Bridget Nelson and Mary Jo Pehl	January 6, 2017	1948
RiffTrax Live: Carnival of Souls	Michael J. Nelson, Kevin Murphy and Bill Corbett	January 27, 2017	1962
The Wonderful Land of Oz	Michael J. Nelson, Kevin Murphy and Bill Corbett	February 3, 2017	1969
Replica	Michael J. Nelson, Kevin Murphy and Bill Corbett	February 10, 2017	2005
Retro Puppet Master	Michael J. Nelson, Kevin Murphy and Bill Corbett	February 24, 2017	1999
Ator, the Fighting Eagle	Michael J. Nelson, Kevin Murphy and Bill Corbett	March 10, 2017	1982
Day of the Animals	Michael J. Nelson, Kevin Murphy and Bill Corbett	March 24, 2017	1977
RiffTrax Presents: Angels Revenge	Bridget Nelson and Mary Jo Pehl	April 7, 2017	1979
Grizzly	Michael J. Nelson, Kevin Murphy and Bill Corbett	April 21, 2017	1976
Star Games	Michael J. Nelson, Kevin Murphy and Bill Corbett	May 19, 2017	1998
Missile X: The Neutron Bomb Incident	Michael J. Nelson, Kevin Murphy and Bill Corbett	June 2, 2017	1978
Uninvited	Michael J. Nelson, Kevin Murphy and Bill Corbett	June 9, 2017	1988
RiffTrax Presents: Hangar 18	Matthew J. Elliott and Ian Potter	June 23, 2017	1980
RiffTrax Live: Samurai Cop	Michael J. Nelson, Kevin Murphy and Bill Corbett	July 7, 2017	1991
The Little Unicorn	Michael J. Nelson, Kevin Murphy and Bill Corbett	July 14, 2017	2002
Final Justice	Michael J. Nelson, Kevin Murphy and Bill Corbett	August 3, 2017	1985
RiffTrax Live: Summer Shorts Beach Party	Michael J. Nelson, Kevin Murphy and Bill Corbett with guest riffers Bridget Nelson, Mary Jo Pehl, Trace Beaulieu, Frank Conniff and Paul F. Tompkins	August 11, 2017	Various
Miami Connection	Michael J. Nelson, Kevin Murphy and Bill Corbett	September 1, 2017	1987
RiffTrax Presents: Deadly Instincts	Bridget Nelson and Mary Jo Pehl	September 8, 2017	1997
Merlin: The Return	Michael J. Nelson, Kevin Murphy and Bill Corbett	September 14, 2017	2000
The Psychotronic Man	Michael J. Nelson, Kevin Murphy and Bill Corbett	September 22, 2017	1980
Oblivion	Michael J. Nelson, Kevin Murphy and Bill Corbett	September 29, 2017	1994
Kill and Kill Again	Michael J. Nelson, Kevin Murphy and Bill Corbett	October 13, 2017	1981
Mind Ripper	Michael J. Nelson, Kevin Murphy and Bill Corbett	October 27, 2017	1995
Pressure Point	Michael J. Nelson, Kevin Murphy and Bill Corbett	November 17, 2017	1997
RiffTrax Presents: Beyond Christmas	Bridget Nelson and Mary Jo Pehl	December 15, 2017	1940
Jack Frost	Michael J. Nelson, Kevin Murphy and Bill Corbett	December 22, 2017	1997
Starship Invasions	Michael J. Nelson, Kevin Murphy and Bill Corbett	January 5, 2018	1977
The Journey: Absolution	Michael J. Nelson, Kevin Murphy and Bill Corbett	January 12, 2018	1997
Berserker: Hell's Warrior	Michael J. Nelson, Kevin Murphy and Bill Corbett	February 2, 2018	2004
Invasion of the Animal People	Michael J. Nelson, Kevin Murphy and Bill Corbett	February 9, 2018	1959
Son of Sinbad	Michael J. Nelson, Kevin Murphy and Bill Corbett	February 23, 2018	1955
RiffTrax Presents: Planet Outlaws	Matthew J. Elliott and Ian Potter	March 2, 2018	1939
Oblivion 2: Backlash	Michael J. Nelson, Kevin Murphy and Bill Corbett	March 9, 2018	1996
Godmonster of Indian Flats	Michael J. Nelson, Kevin Murphy and Bill Corbett	March 23, 2018	1973
Dark Future	Michael J. Nelson, Kevin Murphy and Bill Corbett	April 13, 2018	1994
The Fairy King of Ar	Michael J. Nelson, Kevin Murphy and Bill Corbett	April 20, 2018	1998
RiffTrax Presents: Junior Prom	Bridget Nelson and Mary Jo Pehl	April 27, 2018	1946
The House on Sorority Row	Michael J. Nelson, Kevin Murphy and Bill Corbett	May 18, 2018	1983
Gammera the Invincible	Michael J. Nelson, Kevin Murphy and Bill Corbett	June 1, 2018	1965
RiffTrax Presents: Sherlock Holmes and the Woman in Green	Bridget Nelson and Mary Jo Pehl	June 8, 2018	1945
The Dark	Michael J. Nelson, Kevin Murphy and Bill Corbett	June 19, 2018	1979
RiffTrax Presents: Snowbeast	Matthew J. Elliott and Ian Potter	June 29, 2018	1977
Omega Cop	Michael J. Nelson, Kevin Murphy and Bill Corbett	July 12, 2018	1990
RiffTrax Presents: She	Bridget Nelson and Mary Jo Pehl	July 18, 2018	1935
A Talking Cat!?!	Michael J. Nelson, Kevin Murphy and Bill Corbett	July 26, 2018	2013
RiffTrax Presents: Devil Girl from Mars	Bridget Nelson and Mary Jo Pehl	August 2, 2018	1954
RiffTrax Live: Space Mutiny	Michael J. Nelson, Kevin Murphy and Bill Corbett	August 10, 2018	1988
Ice Cream Man	Michael J. Nelson, Kevin Murphy and Bill Corbett	August 17, 2018	1995
Spiker	Michael J. Nelson, Kevin Murphy and Bill Corbett	August 30, 2018	1986
Rifftrax Presents: Freddie Steps Out	Bridget Nelson and Mary Jo Pehl	September 7, 2018	1946
Rifftrax Presents: Rescue Me	Bridget Nelson and Mary Jo Pehl	September 21, 2018	1992
The Phantom Creeps	Michael J. Nelson, Kevin Murphy and Bill Corbett	September 28, 2018	1939
Terror in the Wax Museum	Michael J. Nelson, Kevin Murphy and Bill Corbett	October 26, 2018	1973
Trucker's Woman	Michael J. Nelson, Kevin Murphy and Bill Corbett	November 2, 2018	1975
The RiffTrax Yule Log	Michael J. Nelson, Kevin Murphy, Bill Corbett, Bridget Nelson and Mary Jo Pehl	November 20, 2018	Various
Santa's Summer House	Michael J. Nelson, Kevin Murphy and Bill Corbett	December 14, 2018	2012
RiffTrax Presents: Sherlock Holmes: Dressed to Kill	Bridget Nelson and Mary Jo Pehl	January 4, 2019	1946
Yor, the Hunter from the Future	Michael J. Nelson, Kevin Murphy and Bill Corbett	January 18, 2019	1983
RiffTrax Presents: Purple Death from Outer Space	Matthew J. Elliott and Ian Potter	February 1, 2019	1966
Killers from Space	Michael J. Nelson, Kevin Murphy and Bill Corbett	February 8, 2019	1954
The Sorcerer's Apprentice	Michael J. Nelson, Kevin Murphy and Bill Corbett	February 22, 2019	2001
Day of the Shorts: SF Sketchfest 2019	Kevin Murphy and Bill Corbett with guest riffers Paul F. Tompkins, John Hodgman, Bridget Nelson, Frank Conniff, Trace Beaulieu, Janet Varney, Cole Stratton and Sean Thomason	March 1, 2019	Various
The Girl from Rio	Michael J. Nelson, Kevin Murphy and Bill Corbett	March 8, 2019	1969
RiffTrax Presents: She Demons	Bridget Nelson and Mary Jo Pehl	March 22, 2019	1958
Rats: Night of Terror	Michael J. Nelson, Kevin Murphy and Bill Corbett	March 29, 2019	1984
RiffTrax Presents: Scared to Death	Bridget Nelson and Mary Jo Pehl	April 5, 2019	1980
Zombie, AKA I Eat Your Skin	Michael J. Nelson, Kevin Murphy and Bill Corbett	April 24, 2019	1964
RiffTrax Presents: High School Hero	Bridget Nelson and Mary Jo Pehl	May 3, 2019	1946
Blood Theatre	Michael J. Nelson, Kevin Murphy and Bill Corbett	May 9, 2019	1984
Giant from the Unknown	Michael J. Nelson, Kevin Murphy and Bill Corbett	May 17, 2019	1958
RiffTrax Live: Octaman	Michael J. Nelson, Kevin Murphy and Bill Corbett	May 31, 2019	1971
The Power	Michael J. Nelson, Kevin Murphy and Bill Corbett	June 7, 2019	1984
Yesterday's Target	Michael J. Nelson, Kevin Murphy and Bill Corbett	June 14, 2019	1996
RiffTrax Presents: Sherlock Holmes and the Deadly Necklace	Bridget Nelson and Matthew J. Elliott	June 21, 2019	1962
1990: The Bronx Warriors	Michael J. Nelson, Kevin Murphy and Bill Corbett	June 28, 2019	1982
Kill or Be Killed	Michael J. Nelson, Kevin Murphy and Bill Corbett	July 12, 2019	1980
RiffTrax Presents: Fear	Bridget Nelson and Mary Jo Pehl	July 26, 2019	1946
The Million Eyes of Sumuru	Michael J. Nelson, Kevin Murphy and Bill Corbett	August 2, 2019	1967
RiffTrax Live: Star Raiders	Michael J. Nelson, Kevin Murphy and Bill Corbett	August 9, 2019	2017
RiffTrax Presents: Vacation Days	Bridget Nelson and Mary Jo Pehl	September 6, 2019	1947
Subspecies IV: The Awakening	Michael J. Nelson, Kevin Murphy and Bill Corbett	September 13, 2019	1998
RiffTrax Presents: Atom Age Vampire	Matthew J. Elliott and Ian Potter	September 20, 2019	1960
Karate Cop	Michael J. Nelson, Kevin Murphy and Bill Corbett	September 24, 2019	1991
Contamination	Michael J. Nelson, Kevin Murphy and Bill Corbett	October 4, 2019	1980
RiffTrax Live: The Giant Spider Invasion	Michael J. Nelson, Kevin Murphy and Bill Corbett	October 18, 2019	1975
The Visitor	Michael J. Nelson, Kevin Murphy and Bill Corbett	October 25, 2019	1979
Feeders	Michael J. Nelson, Kevin Murphy and Bill Corbett	November 1, 2019	1996
Martial Law	Michael J. Nelson, Kevin Murphy and Bill Corbett	November 20, 2019	1991
Robo Vampire	Michael J. Nelson, Kevin Murphy and Bill Corbett	December 6, 2019	1988
Feeders 2: Slay Bells	Michael J. Nelson, Kevin Murphy and Bill Corbett	December 12, 2019	1998
RiffTrax Presents: A Very Merry Riff-Mas (featuring Yes, Virginia, There Is a Santa Claus; Frosty the Snowman; and Christmas on Grandfather's Farm)	Bridget Nelson and Mary Jo Pehl	December 20, 2019	Various
Attack of the Super Monsters	Michael J. Nelson, Kevin Murphy and Bill Corbett	December 27, 2019	1982
RiffTrax Presents: Sherlock Holmes: Terror by Night	Bridget Nelson and Mary Jo Pehl	January 3, 2020	1946
RiffTrax Presents: Strange Impersonation	Bridget Nelson and Mary Jo Pehl	January 10, 2020	1946
Sunset Strip	Michael J. Nelson, Kevin Murphy and Bill Corbett	January 17, 2020	1985
The Shape of Things to Come	Michael J. Nelson, Kevin Murphy and Bill Corbett	January 31, 2020	1979
Bounty Tracker	Michael J. Nelson, Kevin Murphy and Bill Corbett	February 7, 2020	1993
Hijacked: Flight 285	Michael J. Nelson, Kevin Murphy and Bill Corbett	February 20, 2020	1996
Velvet Smooth	Michael J. Nelson, Kevin Murphy and Bill Corbett	February 28, 2020	1976
RiffTrax Presents: Lady Mobster	Bridget Nelson and Mary Jo Pehl	March 6, 2020	1988
The Ninja Warlord	Michael J. Nelson, Kevin Murphy and Bill Corbett	March 20, 2020	1973
Lovely But Deadly	Michael J. Nelson, Kevin Murphy and Bill Corbett	March 27, 2020	1981
RiffTrax Presents: Sherlock Holmes and the Secret Weapon	Bridget Nelson and Mary Jo Pehl	April 17, 2020	1943
The Most Dangerous Game	Michael J. Nelson, Kevin Murphy and Bridget Nelson	April 24, 2020	1932
Suburban Sasquatch	Michael J. Nelson, Kevin Murphy and Bill Corbett	May 1, 2020	2004
Aladdin	Michael J. Nelson, Kevin Murphy and Bill Corbett	May 14, 2020	1990
RiffTrax Presents: Bride of the Gorilla	Bridget Nelson and Mary Jo Pehl	May 29, 2020	1951
RiffTrax Presents: Assignment:Outer Space	Matthew J. Elliott and Ian Potter	June 5, 2020	1960
The Return	Michael J. Nelson, Kevin Murphy and Bill Corbett	June 12, 2020	1980
Stitches	Michael J. Nelson, Kevin Murphy and Bill Corbett	June 26, 2020	2001
Vengeance of the Dead	Michael J. Nelson, Kevin Murphy and Bill Corbett	July 10, 2020	2001
Light Blast	Michael J. Nelson, Kevin Murphy and Bill Corbett	July 17, 2020	1985
RiffTrax Presents: Frankenstein's Daughter	Bridget Nelson and Mary Jo Pehl	July 31, 2020	1958
Lycan Colony	Michael J. Nelson, Kevin Murphy and Bill Corbett	August 7, 2020	2006
RiffTrax Presents: High School U.S.A.	Bridget Nelson and Mary Jo Pehl	August 14, 2020	1983
RiffTrax Presents: Werewolf in a Girls' Dormitory	Matthew J. Elliott and Ian Potter	August 21, 2020	1961
Martial Law II: Undercover	Michael J. Nelson, Kevin Murphy and Bill Corbett	August 28, 2020	1991
Beaks!	Michael J. Nelson, Kevin Murphy and Bill Corbett	September 11, 2020	1987
Charade	Michael J. Nelson and Bridget Nelson	September 25, 2020	1963
RiffTrax Presents: Amanda & The Alien	Bridget Nelson and Mary Jo Pehl	October 2, 2020	1995
RiffTrax Presents: What Ever Happened to Baby Jane? AKA What Ever Happened To...	Bridget Nelson and Mary Jo Pehl	October 23, 2020	1991
Jack-O AKA Jack-o Lantern	Michael J. Nelson, Kevin Murphy and Bill Corbett	October 30, 2020	1995
Battle for the Lost Planet AKA Galaxy	Michael J. Nelson, Kevin Murphy and Bill Corbett	November 20, 2020	1986
RiffTrax Presents: Baby of the Bride	Bridget Nelson and Mary Jo Pehl	December 11, 2020	1991
It's a Wonderful Life (Special RiffTrax Edit)	Michael J. Nelson, Kevin Murphy and Bill Corbett	December 18, 2020	1946
Merlin's Shop of Mystical Wonders	Michael J. Nelson, Kevin Murphy and Bill Corbett	December 29, 2020	1996
RiffTrax Presents: Invasion of the Bee Girls	Matthew J. Elliott and Ian Potter	January 8, 2021	1973
Frozen Scream	Michael J. Nelson, Kevin Murphy and Bill Corbett	January 15, 2021	1975
RiffTrax Presents: Earth Angel	Bridget Nelson and Mary Jo Pehl	January 23, 2021	1991
Maximum Revenge	Michael J. Nelson, Kevin Murphy and Bill Corbett	January 29, 2021	1998
RiffTrax Presents: The Veil - Part One	Matthew J. Elliott and Ian Potter	February 5, 2021	1958
The Last Man on Earth	Michael J. Nelson, Kevin Murphy and Bill Corbett	February 19, 2021	1964
Double Dragon	Michael J. Nelson, Kevin Murphy and Bill Corbett	February 26, 2021	1994
Fungicide	Michael J. Nelson, Kevin Murphy and Bill Corbett	March 5, 2021	2002
Invaders from Mars	Michael J. Nelson, Kevin Murphy and Bill Corbett	March 26, 2021	1953
Shrunken Heads	Michael J. Nelson, Kevin Murphy and Bill Corbett	April 9, 2021	1994
RiffTrax Presents: Flash Gordon (1954) - Part One	Matthew J. Elliott and Ian Potter	April 16, 2021	1954
The Minion	Michael J. Nelson, Kevin Murphy and Bill Corbett	April 23, 2021	1998
RiffTrax Presents: Mother of the Bride	Bridget Nelson and Mary Jo Pehl	May 7, 2021	1993
Gumby: The Movie	Michael J. Nelson, Kevin Murphy and Bill Corbett	May 28, 2021	1995
The Alien Dead	Michael J. Nelson, Kevin Murphy and Bill Corbett	June 4, 2021	1980
RiffTrax Presents: Mary Higgins Clark's Lucky Day	Bridget Nelson and Mary Jo Pehl	June 11, 2021	2002
Max Havoc: Curse of the Dragon	Michael J. Nelson, Kevin Murphy and Bill Corbett	July 9, 2021	2004
San Franpsycho	Michael J. Nelson, Kevin Murphy and Bill Corbett	July 16, 2021	2006
Universal Soldier II: Brothers in Arms	Michael J. Nelson, Kevin Murphy and Bill Corbett	July 23, 2021	1998
Plankton	Michael J. Nelson, Kevin Murphy and Bill Corbett	July 30, 2021	1994
Baby Ghost	Michael J. Nelson, Kevin Murphy and Bill Corbett	August 6, 2021	1995
RiffTrax Presents: Mary Higgins Clark's Before I Say Goodbye	Bridget Nelson and Mary Jo Pehl	August 27, 2021	2003
Savage	Michael J. Nelson, Kevin Murphy and Bill Corbett	September 10, 2021	1996
RiffTrax Presents: Married Too Young	Bridget Nelson and Mary Jo Pehl	September 17, 2021	1962
Mirror Mirror	Michael J. Nelson, Kevin Murphy and Bill Corbett	September 24, 2021	1990
RiffTrax Live: Hobgoblins	Michael J. Nelson, Kevin Murphy and Bill Corbett	October 15, 2021	1988
RiffTrax Presents: Teenage Space Vampires	Bridget Nelson and Mary Jo Pehl	October 22, 2021	1999
RiffTrax Presents: The Veil - Part Two	Matthew J. Elliott and Ian Potter	November 5, 2021	1958
Dangerous Men	Michael J. Nelson, Kevin Murphy and Bill Corbett	November 12, 2021	2005
Copper Mountain	Michael J. Nelson, Kevin Murphy and Bill Corbett	November 19, 2021	1983
Atomic Eden	Michael J. Nelson, Kevin Murphy and Bill Corbett	December 3, 2021	2015
RiffTrax Presents: Mary Higgins Clark's He Sees You When You're Sleeping	Bridget Nelson and Mary Jo Pehl	December 10, 2021	2002
Father Frost	Michael J. Nelson, Kevin Murphy and Bill Corbett	December 17, 2021	1965
Dancin: It's On!	Michael J. Nelson, Kevin Murphy and Bill Corbett	December 23, 2021	2015
RiffTrax Live: Amityville: The Evil Escapes	Michael J. Nelson, Kevin Murphy and Bill Corbett	January 7, 2022	1989
Fugitive Rage	Michael J. Nelson, Kevin Murphy and Bill Corbett	January 14, 2022	1996
Winterbeast	Michael J. Nelson, Kevin Murphy and Bill Corbett	January 28, 2022	1992
RiffTrax Presents: Children of the Bride	Bridget Nelson and Mary Jo Pehl	February 4, 2022	1990
The Retrievers	Michael J. Nelson, Kevin Murphy and Bill Corbett	February 25, 2022	1982
Things	Michael J. Nelson, Kevin Murphy and Bill Corbett	March 4, 2022	1989
Max Havoc: Ring of Fire	Michael J. Nelson, Kevin Murphy and Bill Corbett	March 11, 2022	2006
Rapid Assault	Michael J. Nelson, Kevin Murphy and Bill Corbett	March 25, 2022	1997
Zombie Nightmare	Michael J. Nelson, Kevin Murphy and Bill Corbett	April 1, 2022	1987
RiffTrax Presents: Flash Gordon - Part Two	Matthew J. Elliott and Ian Potter	April 7, 2022	1954
A Dangerous Man	Michael J. Nelson, Kevin Murphy and Bill Corbett	April 29, 2022	2009
RiffTrax Presents: Mary Higgins Clark's A Crime of Passion	Bridget Nelson and Mary Jo Pehl	May 6, 2022	2003
Jurassic Shark	Michael J. Nelson, Kevin Murphy and Bill Corbett	May 13, 2022	2012
Universal Soldier III: Unfinished Business	Michael J. Nelson, Kevin Murphy and Bill Corbett	May 20, 2022	1998
Escape from the Bronx	Michael J. Nelson, Kevin Murphy and Bill Corbett	June 3, 2022	1983
RiffTrax Presents: Creature from the Haunted Sea	Matthew J. Elliott and Ian Potter	June 10, 2022	1961
Mikey	Michael J. Nelson, Kevin Murphy and Bill Corbett	June 24, 2022	1992
Day of the Assassin	Michael J. Nelson, Kevin Murphy and Bill Corbett	July 15, 2022	1979
RiffTrax Presents: The Brain That Wouldn't Die	Bridget Nelson and Mary Jo Pehl	July 29, 2022	1962
Split Second	Michael J. Nelson, Kevin Murphy and Bill Corbett	August 5, 2022	1992
Cannibal World	Michael J. Nelson, Kevin Murphy and Bill Corbett	August 26, 2022	1980
The Blood of Fu Manchu	Michael J. Nelson, Kevin Murphy and Bill Corbett	September 16, 2022	1968
Blood Harvest	Michael J. Nelson, Kevin Murphy and Bill Corbett	September 30, 2022	1987
RiffTrax Presents: Woman Who Came Back	Bridget Nelson and Mary Jo Pehl	October 21, 2022	1945
Hack-O-Lantern	Michael J. Nelson and Bill Corbett	October 28, 2022	1988
RiffTrax Live: The Return of Swamp Thing	Michael J. Nelson, Kevin Murphy and Bill Corbett	November 4, 2022	1989
Robot Monster	Michael J. Nelson, Kevin Murphy and Bill Corbett	November 18, 2022	1953
Street Law	Michael J. Nelson, Kevin Murphy and Bill Corbett	December 2, 2022	1995
Project: Eliminator	Michael J. Nelson, Kevin Murphy and Bill Corbett	December 9, 2022	1991
The Monster's Christmas	Michael J. Nelson, Kevin Murphy and Bill Corbett	December 23, 2022	1981
In the Line of Duty 2: The Super Cops	Michael J. Nelson, Kevin Murphy and Bill Corbett	January 6, 2023	1985
Destination Inner Space	Michael J. Nelson, Kevin Murphy and Bill Corbett	January 20, 2023	1966
Nightwish	Michael J. Nelson, Kevin Murphy and Bill Corbett	February 3, 2023	1989
Hobgoblins 2	Michael J. Nelson, Kevin Murphy and Bill Corbett	February 10, 2023	2009
Cyclone	Michael J. Nelson, Kevin Murphy and Bill Corbett	February 24, 2023	1978
RiffTrax Presents: Mary Higgins Clark's I'll Be Seeing You	Bridget Nelson and Mary Jo Pehl	March 3, 2023	2004
RiffTrax Presents: Flash Gordon - Part Three	Matthew J. Elliott and Ian Potter	March 10, 2023	1954
RiffTrax Presents: Sherlock Holmes and the Scarlet Claw	Bridget Nelson and Mary Jo Pehl	March 24, 2023	1944
The Bad Pack	Michael J. Nelson, Kevin Murphy and Bill Corbett	March 31, 2023	1997
Gangster World	Michael J. Nelson, Kevin Murphy and Bill Corbett	April 14, 2023	1997
Apex Predators	Michael J. Nelson, Kevin Murphy and Bill Corbett	April 21, 2023	2021
Ironheart	Michael J. Nelson, Kevin Murphy and Bill Corbett	April 28, 2023	1992
RiffTrax Presents: The Magnetic Monster	Bridget Nelson and Mary Jo Pehl	May 5, 2023	1953
In Pursuit	Michael J. Nelson, Kevin Murphy and Bill Corbett	May 19, 2023	2000
The Castle of Fu Manchu	Michael J. Nelson, Kevin Murphy and Bill Corbett	June 2, 2023	1969
RiffTrax Presents: Moon of the Wolf	Matthew J. Elliott and Ian Potter	June 9, 2023	1972
RiffTrax Presents: Inspector Mom	Bridget Nelson and Mary Jo Pehl	June 16, 2023	2006
Bog	Michael J. Nelson, Kevin Murphy and Bill Corbett	June 23, 2023	1979
Charlie Chan: Dark Alibi	Michael J. Nelson, Kevin Murphy and Bill Corbett	July 7, 2023	1946
RiffTrax Presents: The Man Without a Body	Bridget Nelson and Mary Jo Pehl	July 14, 2023	1957
Fatal Combat	Michael J. Nelson, Kevin Murphy and Bill Corbett	July 28, 2023	1995
RiffTrax Presents: The Careless Years	Bridget Nelson and Mary Jo Pehl	August 4, 2023	1957
The X from Outer Space	Michael J. Nelson, Kevin Murphy and Bill Corbett	August 11, 2023	1967
Truth or Dare	Michael J. Nelson, Kevin Murphy and Bill Corbett	September 8, 2023	1986
Samson and Delilah	Michael J. Nelson, Kevin Murphy and Bill Corbett	September 22, 2023	1984
Robocop: The TV Show	Michael J. Nelson, Kevin Murphy and Bill Corbett	September 29, 2023	1994
RiffTrax Presents: The Veil - Part Three	Matthew J. Elliott and Ian Potter	October 6, 2023	1958
Demon Island	Michael J. Nelson, Kevin Murphy and Bill Corbett	October 13, 2023	2002
RiffTrax Presents: Mary Higgins Clark's Try To Remember	Bridget Nelson and Mary Jo Pehl	October 20, 2023	2004
Amityville Dollhouse	Michael J. Nelson, Kevin Murphy and Bill Corbett	October 27, 2023	1996
RiffTrax Live: Rad	Michael J. Nelson, Kevin Murphy and Bill Corbett	November 3, 2023	1986
The Paradise Motel	Michael J. Nelson, Kevin Murphy and Bill Corbett	November 17, 2023	2022
RiffTrax Presents: Inspector Mom 2: Kidnapped in Ten Easy Steps	Bridget Nelson and Mary Jo Pehl	December 1, 2023	2007
The Christmas Martian	Michael J. Nelson, Kevin Murphy and Bill Corbett	December 15, 2023	1971
The Little Mermaid	Michael J. Nelson, Kevin Murphy and Bill Corbett	January 5, 2024	1975
Blood on Her Hands	Bridget Nelson and Mary Jo Pehl	January 12, 2024	1998
GrimTrax (Featuring Reflections to a Very Old Woman, The Stranger, Will You Be Here Tomorrow?, Cipher in the Snow, and The Old Woman)	Michael J. Nelson, Kevin Murphy, and Bill Corbett	January 19, 2024	Various
Terminus	Michael J. Nelson, Kevin Murphy and Bill Corbett	January 26, 2024	1987
The Brain from Planet Arous	Michael J. Nelson, Kevin Murphy and Bill Corbett	February 2, 2024	1957
Spy High	Michael J. Nelson, Kevin Murphy and Bill Corbett	February 9, 2024	2000
RiffTrax Presents: Crime of Passion	Bridget Nelson and Mary Jo Pehl	February 23, 2024	1957
For Life or Death	Michael J. Nelson, Kevin Murphy and Bill Corbett	February 29, 2024	1996
Hangmen	Michael J. Nelson, Kevin Murphy and Bill Corbett	March, 8, 2024	1987
Creating Rem Lezar	Michael J. Nelson, Kevin Murphy and Bill Corbett	March 22, 2024	1989
The Amazing Bulk	Michael J. Nelson, Kevin Murphy and Bill Corbett	April 5, 2024	2012
RiffTrax Presents: Sherlock Holmes and the House of Fear	Bridget Nelson and Mary Jo Pehl	April 19, 2024	1945
The Demons of Ludlow	Michael J. Nelson, Kevin Murphy and Bill Corbett	April 26, 2024	1983
Absolute Force	Michael J. Nelson, Kevin Murphy and Bill Corbett	May 2, 2024	1997
Ember Days	Michael J. Nelson, Kevin Murphy and Bill Corbett	May 17, 2024	2013
Ouija Shark	Michael J. Nelson, Kevin Murphy and Bill Corbett	May 24, 2024	2020
Hell of the Living Dead	Michael J. Nelson, Kevin Murphy and Bill Corbett	May 31, 2024	1980
RiffTrax Presents: Tormented	Bridget Nelson and Mary Jo Pehl	June 7, 2024	1960
Undefeatable	Michael J. Nelson, Kevin Murphy and Bill Corbett	June 21, 2024	1993
RiffTrax Presents: Rock, Rock, Rock!	Bridget Nelson and Mary Jo Pehl	June 28, 2024	1956
Virus - A GrimTrax Feature	Michael J. Nelson, Kevin Murphy and Bill Corbett	July 12, 2024	1980
RiffTrax Presents: Sherlock Holmes: The Spider Woman	Bridget Nelson and Mary Jo Pehl	August 2, 2024	1943
Body Count	Michael J. Nelson, Kevin Murphy and Bill Corbett	August 9, 2024	1995
RiffTrax Presents: She Gods of Shark Reef	Bridget Nelson and Mary Jo Pehl	August 23, 2024	1958
RiffTrax Presents: The Lady Vanishes	Matthew J. Elliott and Ian Potter	September 6, 2024	1938
Lancelot: Guardian of Time	Michael J. Nelson, Kevin Murphy and Bill Corbett	September 27, 2024	1997
RiffTrax Presents: The Woman Who Sinned	Bridget Nelson and Mary Jo Pehl	October 4, 2024	1991
RiffTrax Live: Point Break	Michael J. Nelson, Kevin Murphy and Bill Corbett	October 17, 2024	1991
American Nightmare	Michael J. Nelson, Kevin Murphy and Bill Corbett	October 25, 2024	2002
Xtro 3: Watch the Skies	Michael J. Nelson, Kevin Murphy and Bill Corbett	November 1, 2024	1995
Little Lost Sea Serpent	Michael J. Nelson, Kevin Murphy and Bill Corbett	November 15, 2024	1995
The Fantastic Argoman	Michael J. Nelson, Kevin Murphy and Bill Corbett	November 22, 2024	1967
Fight to Win	Michael J. Nelson, Kevin Murphy and Bill Corbett	December 6, 2024	1987
RiffTrax Presents: A Christmas Romance	Bridget Nelson and Mary Jo Pehl	December 13, 2024	1994
Micro Mini Kids	Michael J. Nelson, Kevin Murphy and Bill Corbett	December 27, 2024	2001
The Death of Richie	Michael J. Nelson, Kevin Murphy and Bill Corbett	January 3, 2025	1977
Super Zeroes	Michael J. Nelson, Kevin Murphy and Bill Corbett	January 24, 2025	
The Lord Protector	Michael J. Nelson, Kevin Murphy and Bill Corbett	January 31, 2025	1996
RiffTrax Presents: Sherlock: Case of Evil	Bridget Nelson and Mary Jo Pehl	February 7, 2025	2002
Space Master X-7	Michael J. Nelson, Kevin Murphy and Bill Corbett	February 28, 2025	1958
Birdemic 3: Sea Eagle	Michael J. Nelson, Kevin Murphy and Bill Corbett	March 7, 2025	2022
Watchalong with Mike and Bridget	Michael J. Nelson and Bridget Nelson	March 18, 2025	
American Werewolf	Michael J. Nelson, Kevin Murphy and Bill Corbett	March 21, 2025	2024
RiffTrax Presents: Q Planes	Matthew J. Elliott and Ian Potter	March 28, 2025	1939
The Banker	Michael J. Nelson, Kevin Murphy and Bill Corbett	April 4, 2025	1989
Black Belt Angels	Michael J. Nelson, Kevin Murphy and Bill Corbett	April 25, 2025	1994
RiffTrax Presents: Untamed Women	Bridget Nelson and Mary Jo Pehl	May 9, 2025	1952
The Phantom Empire	Michael J. Nelson, Kevin Murphy and Bill Corbett	May 16, 2025	1988
Creature from Black Lake	Michael J. Nelson, Kevin Murphy and Bill Corbett	May 30, 2025	1976
The Killer Likes Candy	Michael J. Nelson, Kevin Murphy and Bill Corbett	June 5, 2025	1968
Karate Tiger 2	Michael J. Nelson, Kevin Murphy and Bill Corbett	June 20, 2025	1987
RiffTrax Presents: Pharaoh's Curse	Bridget Nelson and Mary Jo Pehl	June 27, 2025	1957
Party Line	Michael J. Nelson, Kevin Murphy and Bill Corbett	July 11, 2025	1988
RifffTrax Presents: D.O.A.	Bridget Nelson and Mary Jo Pehl	August 1, 2025	1950
Jurassic Shark 2: Aquapocalypse	Michael J. Nelson, Kevin Murphy and Bill Corbett	August 22, 2025	2021
RiffTrax Presents: The Hound of the Baskervilles	Bridget Nelson and Mary Jo Pehl	August 29, 2025	1939
The Princess and the Magic Frog	Michael J. Nelson, Kevin Murphy and Bill Corbett	September 5, 2025	1965
Guns of El Chupacabra	Michael J. Nelson, Kevin Murphy and Bill Corbett	September 26, 2025	1997
Unknown Island	Michael J. Nelson, Kevin Murphy and Bill Corbett	October 3, 2025	1948
RiffTrax Live: Timecop	Michael J. Nelson, Kevin Murphy and Bill Corbett	October 17, 2025	1994
RiffTrax Presents: The Face of Marble	Bridget Nelson and Mary Jo Pehl	October 24, 2025	1946
Mirror Mirror 2: Raven Dance	Michael J. Nelson, Kevin Murphy and Bill Corbett	October 31, 2025	1994
Flight to Hell	Michael J. Nelson, Kevin Murphy and Bill Corbett	November 7, 2025	2003
Champagne and Bullets	Michael J. Nelson, Kevin Murphy and Bill Corbett	November 14, 2025	1993
The Humanoid	Michael J. Nelson, Kevin Murphy and Bill Corbett	November 21, 2025	1979
The Riffer's Cup	Michael J. Nelson, Kevin Murphy and Bill Corbett	November 24, 2025	Various
RiffTrax Presents: Inspector Mom: The Mystery of Mrs. Plumlee	Bridget Nelson and Mary Jo Pehl	December 5, 2025	2006
Impulse	Michael J. Nelson, Kevin Murphy and Bill Corbett	December 12, 2025	1974
RiffTrax Presents: A Christmas Wish	Bridget Nelson and Mary Jo Pehl	December 19, 2025	1950
Beyond the Ring	Michael J. Nelson, Kevin Murphy and Bill Corbett	January 2, 2026	2008
RiffTrax Presents: High Treason	Matthew J. Elliott and Ian Potter	January 9, 2026	1929
GrimTrax Returns	Michael J. Nelson, Kevin Murphy and Bill Corbett	January 16, 2026	Various
RiffTrax Presents: Inspector Mom: Mother Goose Murder	Bridget Nelson and Mary Jo Pehl	January 23, 2026	2007
Hunks of Junk	Michael J. Nelson, Kevin Murphy and Bill Corbett	February 6, 2026	Various
RiffTrax Presents: I Love Trouble	Bridget Nelson and Mary Jo Pehl	February 20, 2026	1948
RiffTrax Presents: Inspector Mom: The Corpse's Costume	Bridget Nelson and Mary Jo Pehl	February 27, 2026	2006
RiffTrax Presents: The Ghost Ship	Matthew J. Elliott and Ian Potter	March 6, 2026	1943
Robowar	Michael J. Nelson, Kevin Murphy and Bill Corbett	March 27, 2026	2018
Yeti: Giant of the 20th Century	Michael J. Nelson, Kevin Murphy and Bill Corbett	April 10, 2026	1976
RiffTrax Presents: The Pearl of Death	Bridget Nelson and Mary Jo Pehl	April 17, 2026	1944
Monster from Green Hell	Michael J. Nelson, Kevin Murphy and Bill Corbett	April 25, 2026	1957
RiffTrax Presents: Inspector Mom: Casualty Friday	Bridget Nelson and Mary Jo Pehl	May 8, 2026	2006
Return to Boggy Creek	Michael J. Nelson, Kevin Murphy and Bill Corbett	July 10, 2026	1977
Demonwarp	Michael J. Nelson, Kevin Murphy and Bill Corbett	July 17, 2026	1988
RiffTrax Presents: Circle of Friends	Bridget Nelson and Mary Jo Pehl	July 31, 2026	2006
Maneater of Hydra	Michael J. Nelson, Kevin Murphy and Bill Corbett	August 7, 2026	1967
Without Warning	Michael J. Nelson, Kevin Murphy and Bill Corbett	August 21, 2026	1980
The Singing Ringing Tree	Michael J. Nelson, Kevin Murphy and Bill Corbett	August 28, 2026	1957
In the Claws of the CIA	Michael J. Nelson, Kevin Murphy and Bill Corbett	September 11, 2026	1981
RiffTrax Presents: Dragonworld: The Legend Continues	Bridget Nelson and Mary Jo Pehl	September 18, 2026	1999
Island of the Living Dead	Michael J. Nelson, Kevin Murphy and Bill Corbett	September 25, 2026	2007
The Angry Breed	Michael J. Nelson, Kevin Murphy and Bill Corbett	October 2, 2026	1968
MST3K - The RiffTrax Experiments - 01 - Sting Of Death	Michael J. Nelson, Kevin Murphy, Bill Corbett and Mary Jo Pehl	October 9, 2026	1966
Offerings	Michael J. Nelson, Kevin Murphy and Bill Corbett	October 16, 2026	1989
MST3K - The RiffTrax Experiments - 02 - Deathsport	Michael J. Nelson, Kevin Murphy, Bill Corbett and Mary Jo Pehl	October 23, 2026	1978

Note: The seven original Mike solo VODs were also released on dual-audio (Riffed and UnRiffed) DVD by Legend Films. Missile to the Moon was also released, but does not contain the Mike & Fred Willard riff.

=== RiffTrax DVDs and Blu-rays ===
These are RiffTrax featuring Mike, Kevin, and Bill on a DVD or Blu-ray with the original film.

Movie	Riffer(s)	RiffTrax released	Original release
Reefer Madness	Michael J. Nelson	April 20, 2004	1936
Night of the Living Dead	Michael J. Nelson	September 7, 2004	1968
Carnival of Souls	Michael J. Nelson	March 29, 2005	1962
The Three Stooges in Color	Film hosted by Michael J. Nelson, Kevin Murphy, and Bill Corbett	April 26, 2005	Various
House on Haunted Hill	Michael J. Nelson	September 6, 2005	1959
Plan 9 from Outer Space	Michael J. Nelson	July 4, 2006	1959
The Little Shop of Horrors	Michael J. Nelson	July 4, 2006	1960
Swing Parade	Michael J. Nelson	March 27, 2007	1946
The Three Stooges' Greatest Routines	Film hosted by Michael J. Nelson and Kevin Murphy	March 27, 2007	Various
Missile to the Moon	Film only	July 17, 2007	1958
Forbidden Zone	Film only	July 15, 2008	1982
Lady Frankenstein	Incognito Cinema Warriors XP	August 12, 2008	1971
RiffTrax Shorts Best Of: Volume 1	Michael J. Nelson, Kevin Murphy, and Bill Corbett	November 17, 2008	Various
RiffTrax Shorts Best Of: Volume 2	Michael J. Nelson, Kevin Murphy, and Bill Corbett	June 16, 2009	Various
Little Shop of Horrors (Three Riffer Edition)	Michael J. Nelson, Kevin Murphy, and Bill Corbett	April 4, 2009	1960
Night of the Living Dead (Three Riffer Edition)	Michael J. Nelson, Kevin Murphy, and Bill Corbett	April 4, 2009	1968
Reefer Madness (Three Riffer Edition)	Michael J. Nelson, Kevin Murphy, and Bill Corbett	April 4, 2009	1936
Carnival of Souls (Three Riffer Edition)	Michael J. Nelson, Kevin Murphy, and Bill Corbett	June 16, 2009	1962
House on Haunted Hill (Three Riffer Edition)	Michael J. Nelson, Kevin Murphy, and Bill Corbett	June 16, 2009	1959
Missile to the Moon (Three Riffer Edition)	Michael J. Nelson, Kevin Murphy, and Bill Corbett	June 16, 2009	1958
Plan 9 from Outer Space (Three Riffer Edition)	Michael J. Nelson, Kevin Murphy, and Bill Corbett	June 16, 2009	1959
Swing Parade (Three Riffer Edition)	Michael J. Nelson, Kevin Murphy, and Bill Corbett	June 16, 2009	1946
Rifftrax Live!: Plan 9 from Outer Space	Michael J. Nelson, Kevin Murphy, and Bill Corbett with guest Jonathan Coulton and host Veronica Belmont	December 10, 2009 (Note: Blu-ray December 15, 2011)	1959
Shorts-Tacular Shorts-Stravaganza	Michael J. Nelson, Kevin Murphy, and Bill Corbett	March 2, 2010	Various
Wide World of Shorts	Michael J. Nelson, Kevin Murphy, and Bill Corbett	March 2, 2010	Various
Planet of Dinosaurs	Michael J. Nelson, Kevin Murphy, and Bill Corbett	March 2, 2010	1978
Voodoo Man	Michael J. Nelson, Kevin Murphy, and Bill Corbett	March 2, 2010	1944
RiffTrax Live: Christmas Shorts-stravaganza!	Michael J. Nelson, Kevin Murphy, and Bill Corbett with guest riffer "Weird Al" Yankovic	March 17, 2010 (Note: Blu-ray January 12, 2012)	Various
RiffTrax Plays with Their Shorts	Michael J. Nelson, Kevin Murphy, and Bill Corbett	May 25, 2010	Various
Shorts-a-Poppin'	Michael J. Nelson, Kevin Murphy, and Bill Corbett	May 25, 2010	Various
Maniac	Michael J. Nelson, Kevin Murphy, and Bill Corbett	November 24, 2010	1934
Order in the Shorts	Michael J. Nelson, Kevin Murphy, and Bill Corbett (American Thrift co-riffed by Veronica Belmont)	January 25, 2011	Various
Shortstoberfest	Michael J. Nelson, Kevin Murphy, and Bill Corbett	January 25, 2011	Various
Santa and the Ice Cream Bunny	Michael J. Nelson, Kevin Murphy, and Bill Corbett	March 8, 2011	1972
RiffTrax: LIVE! Reefer Madness	Michael J. Nelson, Kevin Murphy, and Bill Corbett	May 17, 2011 (Note: Blu-ray July 19)	1936
RiffTrax: LIVE! House on Haunted Hill	Michael J. Nelson, Kevin Murphy, and Bill Corbett with guest riffer Paul F. Tompkins	May 17, 2011 (Note: Blu-ray July 19)	1959
Olde Tyme Shorts Roundup	Michael J. Nelson, Kevin Murphy, and Bill Corbett	July 19, 2011	Various
Shorts To-Go	Michael J. Nelson, Kevin Murphy, and Bill Corbett	July 19, 2011	Various
The Crater Lake Monster	Michael J. Nelson, Kevin Murphy, and Bill Corbett	March 6, 2012	1977
The Galaxy Invader	Michael J. Nelson, Kevin Murphy, and Bill Corbett	March 6, 2012	1985
Hand-crafted Artisanal Shorts	Michael J. Nelson, Kevin Murphy, and Bill Corbett	March 27, 2012	Various
RiffTrax Live: Jack the Giant Killer	Michael J. Nelson, Kevin Murphy, and Bill Corbett	May 1, 2012	1962
Christmas with Rifftrax, ft. The Shanty Where Santa Claus Lives and Magic Christmas Tree	Michael J. Nelson, Kevin Murphy, and Bill Corbett	November 15, 2012	1933/1964
Shorts to Astonish!	Michael J. Nelson, Kevin Murphy, and Bill Corbett (bonus shorts riffed by Cole Stratton and Janet Varney)	December 5, 2012	Various
Rifftrax Live: Birdemic: Shock and Terror	Michael J. Nelson, Kevin Murphy, and Bill Corbett	January 31, 2013	2008
May the Shorts Be With You	Michael J. Nelson, Kevin Murphy, and Bill Corbett	October 21, 2013	Various
Ghosthouse	Michael J. Nelson, Kevin Murphy, and Bill Corbett	November 14, 2013	1988
Christmas with Rifftrax: Santa's Village of Madness (Santa's Enchanted Village/Santa Claus and His Helpers/Santa's Magic Kingdom)	Michael J. Nelson, Kevin Murphy, and Bill Corbett	November 25, 2013	1964/1966
The Guy from Harlem	Michael J. Nelson, Kevin Murphy, and Bill Corbett	April 15, 2014	1977
RiffTrax Live: Manos: The Hands of Fate	Michael J. Nelson, Kevin Murphy, and Bill Corbett	May 6, 2014	1966
Shorts Assemble!	Michael J. Nelson, Kevin Murphy, and Bill Corbett	June 23, 2015	Various
The Incredible 2-Headed Transplant	Michael J. Nelson, Kevin Murphy, and Bill Corbett	November 24, 2015	1971
RiffTrax Live: Santa Claus	Michael J. Nelson, Kevin Murphy, and Bill Corbett	November 24, 2015	1959
RiffTrax Live: Santa Claus Conquers the Martians	Michael J. Nelson, Kevin Murphy, and Bill Corbett	November 24, 2015	1964
The Astro-Zombies	Michael J. Nelson, Kevin Murphy, and Bill Corbett	October 11, 2016	1968
RiffTrax Live: Time Chasers	Michael J. Nelson, Kevin Murphy, and Bill Corbett	November 29, 2016	1994
RiffTrax Live: MST3K Reunion Show	Michael J. Nelson, Kevin Murphy, and Bill Corbett, with guest riffers Bridget Nelson, Mary Jo Pehl, Trace Beaulieu, Frank Conniff, Jonah Ray, and Joel Hodgson	November 29, 2016	Various
RiffTrax Live: Samurai Cop	Michael J. Nelson, Kevin Murphy, and Bill Corbett	July 5, 2017	1991
RiffTrax Live: Summer Shorts Beach Party	Michael J. Nelson, Kevin Murphy, and Bill Corbett, with guest riffers Bridget Nelson, Mary Jo Pehl, Trace Beaulieu, Frank Conniff, and Paul F. Tompkins	August 10, 2017	Various
Bridget and Mary Jo: Short and Sweet!	Bridget Nelson and Mary Jo Pehl	November 19, 2017	Various
RiffTrax Live: Space Mutiny	Michael J. Nelson, Kevin Murphy, and Bill Corbett	August 10, 2018	1988
The Walking Shorts	Michael J. Nelson, Kevin Murphy, and Bill Corbett	October 12, 2018	Various
RiffTrax Live: Octaman	Michael J. Nelson, Kevin Murphy and Bill Corbett	May 31, 2019	1971
RiffTrax Live: Star Raiders	Michael J. Nelson, Kevin Murphy and Bill Corbett	August 9, 2019	2017
RiffTrax Live: The Giant Spider Invasion	Michael J. Nelson, Kevin Murphy and Bill Corbett	October 18, 2019	1975
RiffTrax Live: Hobgoblins	Michael J. Nelson, Kevin Murphy and Bill Corbett	October 15, 2021	1988
RiffTrax Live: Amityville: The Evil Escapes	Michael J. Nelson, Kevin Murphy and Bill Corbett	January 7, 2022	1989
Toxic Box Set (Attack of the Super Monsters/Suburban Sasquatch/Yor, the Hunter from the Future/RiffTrax Toxic Shorts Spill)	Michael J. Nelson, Kevin Murphy and Bill Corbett (with shorts riffed by Bridget Nelson and Mary Jo Pehl and Conor Lastowka and Sean Thomason.	February 2, 2022	Various

Please note that The Incredible 2-Headed Transplant and The Astro-Zombies listed above are not official physical media releases by RiffTrax. The RiffTrax audio tracks was licensed by Kino Lorber as a special feature for their DVD and Blu-ray releases of the films.

=== Music ===
Title
"Love Theme from "Jaws" (When a Man Loves a Shark)"
"Zombie Mambo"
"Reefer Boy"
"Missile to Your Heart"
"(Party at the) House on Haunted Hill"
"Fine"
"Eat Me"
"Animation Samba"
"Diver Damned"
"Come to the Carnival"
"Plans One Thru Nine"
"Sparkly Vampires"
"My Girlfriend Has a Virus"
"Here Comes the Ice Cream Bunny"
"Samurai Cop Rockin' Action Theme"
"Mutiny of Love"
"Krull! The Legendary Theme Song"
"The Legend of Octaman"
"(He's a) Star Raider"
"Spider on the Highway"
"Funky Hobgoblins"
"2000 Miles from Amityville"
"Your Ever-Lovin' Swamp Thing"

=== Other downloads ===
Title	Notes
RiffPlayer	Program that syncs Rifftrax to video

== RiffTrax Live! events ==
The following is a list of Fathom Events's official Rifftrax Live! theatrical showings.

Show number	Movie	Riffed short(s)	Non-riffed short(s)	Riffer(s)	RiffTrax Live showing	Original release
1	Plan 9 from Outer Space	Flying Stewardess	Flour and Grain Expo (by Richard Kyanka); BerryWatch (by Richard Kyanka)	Michael J. Nelson, Kevin Murphy, and Bill Corbett, with guest Jonathan Coulton and host Veronica Belmont	August 20, 2009	1959
2	Christmas Shorts-stravaganza!	Christmas Toy Shop; A Visit to Santa; Christmas Rhapsody; Three Magic Words; Gaylord commercial The Night Before Christmas; Jimmy Jet commercial A Christmas Dream; Parade of Aquatic Champions; The Dingalings Commercial; Rudolph the Red-Nosed Reindeer	Rifftrax Holiday Havoc (by Rifftrax) (Note: Not included in the VOD or DVD release of the live show.)	Michael J. Nelson, Kevin Murphy, and Bill Corbett, with guest riffer "Weird Al" Yankovic	December 16, 2009	Various
3	Reefer Madness	More Dangerous Than Dynamite; At Your Fingertips: Grasses; Aesop's Sound Fables: Frozen Frolics	The Story of the Fairy Mermaid (by Lauren Kyanka); The Story of the Glitter Doll (by Lauren Kyanka)	Michael J. Nelson, Kevin Murphy, and Bill Corbett	August 19, 2010	1936
4	House on Haunted Hill	Magical Disappearing Money; Paper and I		Michael J. Nelson, Kevin Murphy, and Bill Corbett, with guest riffer Paul F. Tompkins	October 28, 2010	1959
5	Jack the Giant Killer	What is Nothing?	The Greatest Superhero (by Lauren Kyanka); A Pretty Love Story (by Lauren Kyanka)	Michael J. Nelson, Kevin Murphy, and Bill Corbett	August 17, 2011	1962
6	Manos: The Hands of Fate	Welcome Back, Norman; At Your Fingertips: Cylinders	California Prune Juice commercial Take It Easy-Torgo Style (by TorgoLives.com)	Michael J. Nelson, Kevin Murphy, and Bill Corbett	August 16, 2012	1966
7	Birdemic: Shock and Terror	Norman Checks In		Michael J. Nelson, Kevin Murphy, and Bill Corbett	October 25, 2012	2008
8	Starship Troopers (Note: Not available as a VOD title as rights to use the title was for theatrical exhibition only. An mp3 commentary for the film based on the live show script was later recorded and released.)			Michael J. Nelson, Kevin Murphy, and Bill Corbett	August 15, 2013	1997
9	Night of the Living Dead	Norman Gives a Speech		Michael J. Nelson, Kevin Murphy, and Bill Corbett	October 24, 2013	1968
10	Santa Claus Conquers the Martians	Santa and the Fairy Snow Queen		Michael J. Nelson, Kevin Murphy, and Bill Corbett	December 5, 2013	1964
11	Sharknado	A Case of Spring Fever; Clips from Godzilla	Clip from Sharknado 2: The Second One	Michael J. Nelson, Kevin Murphy, and Bill Corbett	July 10, 2014	2013
12	Godzilla			Michael J. Nelson, Kevin Murphy, and Bill Corbett	August 14, 2014	1998
13	Anaconda	Halloween Party; Clips from upcoming Total Riff Off special		Michael J. Nelson, Kevin Murphy, and Bill Corbett	October 30, 2014	1997
14	Santa Claus	At Your Fingertips: Sugar and Spice		Michael J. Nelson, Kevin Murphy, and Bill Corbett	December 4, 2014	1959
15	The Room (Note: Not available as a VOD title as rights to use the title was for theatrical exhibition only. An mp3 commentary for the film based on the live show script was later recorded and released as "The Room (RiffTrax "Live" Edition)".)	At Your Fingertips: Floats		Michael J. Nelson, Kevin Murphy, and Bill Corbett	May 6, 2015	2003
16	Sharknado 2: The Second One	Parents-- Who Needs Them?	Clip from Sharknado 3: Oh Hell No!	Michael J. Nelson, Kevin Murphy, and Bill Corbett	July 9, 2015	2014
17	Miami Connection	Let's Measure: Using Standard Units	Clip from the Jack and the Beanstalk segment from Santa and the Ice Cream Bunny	Michael J. Nelson, Kevin Murphy, and Bill Corbett	October 1, 2015	1987
18	Santa and the Ice Cream Bunny (Jack and the Beanstalk alternate version)	Santa Claus' Story; The Tale of Custard the Dragon; Santa's Enchanted Village		Michael J. Nelson, Kevin Murphy, and Bill Corbett	December 3, 2015	1972
19	Time Chasers	Chimp the Fireman		Michael J. Nelson, Kevin Murphy, and Bill Corbett	May 5, 2016	1994
20	MST3K Reunion Show	The Talking Car; A Word to the Wives; More Dates for Kay; Shake Hands with Danger; Americans at Work: Barbers and Beauticians; Stamp Day for Superman; At Your Fingertips: Grasses		Michael J. Nelson, Kevin Murphy, and Bill Corbett, with guest riffers Bridget Nelson, Mary Jo Pehl, Trace Beaulieu, Frank Conniff, Jonah Ray, and Joel Hodgson	June 28, 2016	Various
21	Mothra	Soapy the Germ Fighter		Michael J. Nelson, Kevin Murphy, and Bill Corbett	August 18, 2016	1961
22	Carnival of Souls	The Dirt-Witch Cleans Up; Masks of Grass		Michael J. Nelson, Kevin Murphy, and Bill Corbett	October 27, 2016	1962
23	Samurai Cop	Manners in School		Michael J. Nelson, Kevin Murphy, and Bill Corbett	April 13, 2017	1991
24	Summer Shorts Beach Party	Ricky Raccoon Shows the Way; Office Etiquette; Rhythmic Ball Skills; The Griper; Sentinels of Safety; A Touch of Magic; The Baggs		Michael J. Nelson, Kevin Murphy, and Bill Corbett, with guest riffers Bridget Nelson, Mary Jo Pehl, Trace Beaulieu, Frank Conniff, and Paul F. Tompkins	June 15, 2017	Various
25	Doctor Who: The Five Doctors (Note: An mp3 commentary based on the live show script is forthcoming.)	Play Safe		Michael J. Nelson, Kevin Murphy, and Bill Corbett	August 17, 2017	1983
26	Space Mutiny	The Magic Shop		Michael J. Nelson, Kevin Murphy, and Bill Corbett	June 14, 2018	1988
27	Krull			Michael J. Nelson, Kevin Murphy, and Bill Corbett	August 23, 2018	1983
28	Octaman	McGruff's Drug Alert		Michael J. Nelson, Kevin Murphy, and Bill Corbett	April 18, 2019	1971
29	Star Raiders	Values: Telling the Truth		Michael J. Nelson, Kevin Murphy, and Bill Corbett	June 6, 2019 (taped April 17)	2017
30	The Giant Spider Invasion	Adventure in Telezonia		Michael J. Nelson, Kevin Murphy, and Bill Corbett	August 15, 2019	1975
31	Hobgoblins	Life in a Medieval Town		Michael J. Nelson, Kevin Murphy, and Bill Corbett	August 17, 2021	1988
32	Amityville: The Evil Escapes	It's Your Accident		Michael J. Nelson, Kevin Murphy, and Bill Corbett	October 26, 2021	1989
33	The Return of Swamp Thing	Danny's Dental Date		Michael J. Nelson, Kevin Murphy, and Bill Corbett	August 18, 2022	1989
34	Rad	Gumby: The Witty Witch and Hidden Valley		Michael J. Nelson, Kevin Murphy, and Bill Corbett	August 17, 2023	1986
35	Point Break			Michael J. Nelson, Kevin Murphy, and Bill Corbett	August 8, 2024	1991
36	Time Cop	Our Friend the Policeman		Michael J. Nelson, Kevin Murphy, and Bill Corbett	June 26, 2025	1994

In October and November 2015, RiffTrax had a poll on their website asking users to choose two previous RiffTrax Live shows, up to and including Miami Connection, that they would like to see return to theaters in one night only encore presentations under the title "Best of RiffTrax Live!". The winners were Starship Troopers, rebroadcast on January 14, 2016 and The Room, rebroadcast on January 28, 2016.

On December 1, 2016, RiffTrax rebroadcast two of their previous RiffTrax Live Christmas shows, Santa Claus Conquers the Martians and Christmas Shorts-stravaganza!, under the title "The RiffTrax Holiday Special Double Feature". The only new material in this event was a pre-recorded segment featuring Michael J. Nelson, Kevin Murphy, and Bill Corbett riffing on fan-submitted Christmas photos.

== See also ==
- RiffTrax: The Game
