= Momoe =

- Gender: Female

Origin
- Origin: Japanese
- Meaning: Different meanings depending on the kanji used

Other names
- Alternative spelling: 桃江

Momoe (written: 百恵 or 百重) is a feminine Japanese given name. Notable people with the name include:

- Momoe Mori (森 萌々穂) (born 2004), Japanese entertainer
- Momoe Nakanishi (中西 百重) (born 1980), Japanese professional wrestler
- Momoe Yamaguchi (山口 百恵) (born 1959), Japanese singer, actress and idol

== Characters ==
Surname:

- Nagisa Momoe (百江 なぎさ), a character in the anime series Puella Magi Madoka Magica

Given name:

- Momoe Sawaki (沢木桃恵), a character in Wonder Egg Priority
