= Mortuary Academy =

1988 film

- Directed by: Michael Schroeder
- Written by: William Kelman
- Produced by: Dennis Winfrey; Chip Miller
- Starring: Paul Bartel; Mary Woronov; Perry Lang
- Cinematography: Roy H. Wagner
- Edited by: Ellen Keneshea
- Music by: David Spear
- Production company: Landmark Films
- Distributed by: Columbia Pictures Home Video
- Release date: 18 May 1988
- Running time: 86 minutes
- Country: United States
- Language: English
- Budget: $2 million

Mortuary Academy is a 1988 American comedy film starring Christopher Atkins and Perry Lang. The film was released on DVD in full screen with no extras in 2005.

== Plot summary ==
Sam (Christopher Atkins) and Max Grimm (Perry Lang) inherit the Grimm Mortuary and Academy from their uncle, but in order to obtain it, they must graduate from the mortician's course. The current owner is Dr. Paul Truscott (Paul Bartel), who tells the Grimm brothers that if they fail to graduate, the ownership of the business will stay with him. Truscott and his assistant Mary (Mary Woronov), who is the only professor at the academy, conspire to make sure the brothers do not succeed. Both Paul and Mary have necrophilia, messing with dead bodies and doing poor mortuary jobs for customers. The other students try to graduate as well, including a student that impales dead bodies and another student that brings a puppy "back from the dead" with robotic engineering.

== Cast ==
- Richard Kennedy as George Miller Esq. (credited as R. D. Kennedy)
- Christopher Atkins as Max Grimm
- Perry Lang as Sam Grimm
- Bruce Wagner as Schuyler
- Megan Blake as Tammy
- Nedra Volz as Helen
- Paul Bartel as Paul Truscott
- Mary Woronov as Mary Purcell
- Anthony James as Abbott Smith
- Bill Kerr as Brody
- Tracey Walter as Don Dickson
- Mark Hammond as Larry Hirsch
- Lynn Danielson-Rosenthal as Valerie Levitt (credited as Lynn Danielson)
- Stoney Jackson as James Dandridge
- Cheryl Starbuck as Linda Hollyhead
- Brian Cole as Randy
- Cesar Romero as Ship's Captain
- Vance Colvig Jr. as Uncle Willard (credited as Vance Colvig)
- Barbara Sands as Mrs. Feuer
- Gregory R. Wolf as Tony (credited as Gregory Wolf)
- Jeff Thiel as Sean O'Rourke (credited as Jeffrey Thiel)
- James Thiel as Mick O'Rourke
- Tamayo Otsuki as Nancy Nissan (credited as Tamayo)
- Karen Lorre as Christie Doll (credited as Karen Whitter)
- Wolfman Jack as Bernie Berkowitz
- Charles Gherardi as Mr. Harding (credited as Charles Gherard)
- Chris Hebert as Ben Biallystock
- Michael Jason Rosen as Ben's Brother (credited as Michael Rosen)
- Bob Tzudiker as Mr. Biallystock
- James Daughton as Yuppie At Car Lot
- Dona Speir as Nurse
- Kymberly Paige as Nurse
- Rebekka Armstrong as Nurse
- Laurie Ann Carr as Nurse
- Kimberly Ann Evans as Skating Waitress
- Vickie Benson as Salesgirl
- Bobbi Pavis as Sexy Dancer
- Leisa Washington as Lady Caterer

== Reception ==
A review in the book VideoHound's Complete Guide to Cult Flicks and Trash Pics says, "An attempt to recapture the successful black humor of the earlier Bartel/Woronov teaming Eating Raoul, this one's dead on arrival except for an uproarious title sequence". Glenn Erickson of DVD Talk wrote, "As can be guessed, Mortuary Academy is basically a one-joke idea drawn out to infinity. It lacks a satiric edge and only Bartel and Woronov are intermittently amusing." Ian Arbuckle, writing for CHUD.com, said, "Its edgy humor has been somewhat dulled by time (the film was released in ’88), but it’s still as good as most gross-out comedies these days, and at least it’s internally coherent." It was reviewed by Variety.
