= The Secret Cinema =

- Directed by: Paul Bartel
- Written by: Paul Bartel
- Produced by: Paul Bartel; Bob Schulenberg
- Starring: Amy Vane; Philip Carlson; Barry Dennen; Connie Ellison; Gordon Felio; Estelle Omens
- Cinematography: Fred Wellington
- Edited by: Sam Moore
- Music by: The Rusty Nails
- Production company: Hacienda-Tropicana-Madness
- Distributed by: The Film-Makers' Cooperative
- Release date: 1966
- Running time: 30 min.
- Country: United States
- Language: English
- Budget: $5,000

The Secret Cinema is a short black-and-white film produced, written, and directed by Paul Bartel, and released in 1966, gaining somewhat wider distribution in 1968. The film is about a woman who is manipulated by people around her so a director can film her to screen the results in a theater. The film is described as voyeuristic or surveillance film, though obviously staged.

== Plot summary ==
Jane (Amy Vane) is a secretary whose daily activities are being secretly filmed, with the knowledge and assistance of those who are closest to her. She's sexually harassed by her corpulent boss, Mr. Troppogrosso (Gordon Felio), humiliated by her boyfriend, given the gaslight treatment by the people around her, etc. The film is then shown in theaters. She is starting to suspect that something isn't quite right.

== Notes ==
- In 1986, Paul Bartel remade the film as an episode of Amazing Stories (season 1, episode 20), in which Bartel also played the part of the psychiatrist Dr. Shreck.
- This film has been released on videocassette by Rhino Entertainment, packaged with a 7-minute erotic short entitled The Naughty Nurse.
- In 1998, the premise of someone's life being secretly filmed was used in The Truman Show.
- In 2012 The Secret Cinema, along with The Naughty Nurse, was released as a bonus feature on The Criterion Collection's DVD and Blu-ray releases of Eating Raoul.
- In 2017, The Secret Cinema was restored by the Academy Film Archive and The Film Foundation with funding provided by the George Lucas Family Foundation.

== See also ==
- List of American films of 1966
- List of films featuring surveillance
