= Russkies =

1987 film by Rick Rosenthal

- Theatrical release poster
- Directed by: Rick Rosenthal
- Written by: Sheldon Lettich; Alan Jay Glueckman; Michael Nankin
- Produced by: Mark Levinson; Scott Rosenfelt
- Starring: Whip Hubley; Leaf Phoenix; Peter Billingsley; Stefan DeSalle
- Cinematography: Reed Smoot
- Edited by: Antony Gibbs
- Music by: James Newton Howard
- Distributed by: New Century Vista Film Company
- Release date: November 6, 1987
- Running time: 99 minutes
- Country: United States
- Language: English
- Box office: $2,189,047

Russkies is a 1987 American comedy-drama film starring Whip Hubley, Leaf Phoenix and Peter Billingsley, directed by Rick Rosenthal with cinematography by Reed Smoot.

== Plot ==
A few nights before Independence Day, three 12-year old military brats (Danny Kovac, Adam Vandermeer, and Jason Foley) gather in a Key West bedroom reading their favorite comic book, Sgt. Slammer. Meanwhile, a Soviet warship is anchored just off the coast. Intelligence officer Sulock ignores the captain and drags Mischa Pushkin and Boris into a raft to row ashore and accept a prototype surveillance device from a U.S. turncoat. The raft capsizes, and Mischa washes ashore.

The next morning, Danny, Adam, and Jason set out in their motorboat for their hideout. Along the way, they find a Russian-language codebook and the wrecked raft with Russian lettering. Adam and Jason head back to the city and leave Danny to secure their bunker. Danny enters the bunker and finds himself held at gunpoint by Mischa. Unable to warn anyone of the suspected invasion, Adam and Jason return and overpower Mischa.

The boys interrogate Mischa, with Danny set on turning Mischa over to the police. Adam is more interested in being diplomatic. Since Mischa had dislocated his arm and they have no medical training, they enlist Adam's nursing-student sister Diane. After lunch, tensions flare over what to do next, with Jason siding with Adam not to turn Mischa over to the authorities. Mischa buys clothes, and the four play at the racetrack, arcade, mini-golf, and batting cages. Later in the day, Adam goes off to maintain his cover story to his father, who has realized that Adam's invasion theory may have been right. Still, before Jason can leave, they encounter Raimy, a drunken U.S. Army corporal causing trouble on the docks. Mischa intercedes and nearly come to blows before the military policemen turn up and return Raimy to base. Mischa berates himself, realizing he almost committed what could be an act of war, and says that perhaps he should give himself up after all.

Danny devises a plan for the boys to borrow a pleasure craft from the marina and deliver their friend to Cuba, where he might find his way home. Getting help from Diane again, they learn that their parents went to their bunker.

Raimy intercepts Mischa and the boys on the way to commandeer a boat. The encounter with Raimy causes a delay long enough for the ship to leave the dock by its owner. Thinking Mischa's at a dead end, they are greeted by Sulock and Boris, who communicate the Soviet submarine is on the way to pick them up after midnight. Once Adam and Jason leave to borrow another boat for the rendezvous, Sulock pulls a gun on Danny, ordering Mischa and Boris to tie him up. Sulock shoves Mischa and Boris out of the boathouse at gunpoint, planning to break into the army base and steal the surveillance device. After begging Sulock not to go through with this potential act of war, Mischa trips an alarm and retreats to the boathouse with Raimy and the military police on their tail. The boys' parents nearly run the Russians down, and Diane inadvertently reveals everything when she recognizes Mischa.

After Sulock orders everyone into the boat, Mischa unties Danny and begs him to find help. Trying to call the police, Danny witnesses Raimy commandeering his drinking buddies' ship to chase down the Russians. Danny stumbles across the van of a local performer who impersonates Sgt. Slammer and takes his jetpack to fly out over the ocean.

The parents arrive at the rendezvous point. Danny flies over in the jetpack. Raimy shoots him down and shoots Mischa as he dives into the water to rescue Danny. Free of the jetpack, Danny surfaces and pleads for his father Sgt. Kovac to save Mischa. Once all three of them are safe on the ship, the Soviet submarine surfaces, and its sailors draw their guns. Fearing their comrades are about to be killed, Sulock puts his gun to Adam's head. Diane and Sgt. Kovac stand in front of Mischa, ready to take Raimy's bullet for him. After a few tense minutes, the standoff ends peacefully.

The next morning, Raimy and Sulock get arrested by their respective militaries. Sgt. Kovac and Mischa embrace in mutual gratitude. Mischa is the last Russian to enter the submarine, saying goodbye to his young friends and fervently hoping he and the boys will meet again. The final scene shows Danny in his bedroom reading Mischa's favorite book, War and Peace, to Adam and Jason dressed in civilian clothing, thereby indicating they've abandoned their military personalities.

== Cast ==
- Whip Hubley as Mischa Pushkin
- Leaf Phoenix as Danny Kovac
- Peter Billingsley as Adam Vandermeer
- Stefan DeSalle as Jason Foley
- Susan Walters as Diane Vandermeer
- Patrick Kilpatrick as Raimy
- Vic Polizos as Sulock
- Charles Frank as Mr. Vandermeer
- Susan Blanchard as Mrs. Vandermeer
- Benjamin Hendrickson as Sgt. Kovac
- Carole King as Mrs. Kovac
- Vojeslav Govedarica as Boris
- Al White as Captain Foley
- Summer Phoenix as Candi Kovac
- Leo Rossi as Keefer
- Nancy Stephens as Nurse
- Jon Savitch as Sgt. Slammer

== Production ==
The comic books and technical manuals seen in Russkies were all props crafted for the film by Blackthorne Publishing.

== Reception ==
Audiences polled by CinemaScore gave the film an average grade of "B-" on an A+ to F scale. On the review aggregator website Rotten Tomatoes, 14% of 7 critics' reviews are positive, with an average rating of 4.3/10.

== Home media ==
Russkies was released on VHS by Lorimar Home Video and on Laserdisc by Image Entertainment in 1988. In 2002, a budget DVD of the film was released by Platinum Disc, but with no bonus features and presented only in full frame.

== See also ==
- The Russians Are Coming, the Russians Are Coming!
