= Shelf Life (film) =

- Directed by: Paul Bartel
- Written by: O-Lan Jones; Andrea Stein; Jim Turner
- Produced by: Anne Kimmel; Bradley Laven
- Starring: O-Lan Jones; Andrea Stein; Jim Turner
- Cinematography: Philip Holahan
- Edited by: Judd H. Maslansky
- Music by: Andy Paley
- Distributed by: Northern Arts
- Release date: February 1993 (Palm Springs Film Festival)
- Running time: 81 min.
- Country: United States
- Language: English

Shelf Life is a 1993 American comedy-drama film directed by Paul Bartel. The final film Bartel directed before he died in 2000, it stars O-Lan Jones, Andrea Stein, and Jim Turner.

== Plot ==
Following the assassination of John F. Kennedy in 1963, a Californian family head to their nuclear bunker. The film returns thirty years later and 40 feet underground with a typical day for the children, Tina, Pam and Scotty, still in the bunker, together with their now dead parents.

== Cast ==
- O-Lan Jones as Tina
- Andrea Stein as Pam / Mrs. St. Cloud
- Jim Turner as Scotty / Mr. St. Cloud
- Paul Bartel as Various Apparitions
- Justin Houchin as Young Scotty
- Shelby Lindley as Young Pam
- Jazz Britany as Young Tina

== Production ==
The film originated as a stage show, written and performed by Jones, Stein and Turner. Bartel saw the show at the Lex Theater in Hollywood and the film went into production six weeks after the show ended. The film was shot on a very low budget.

The film is dedicated "For the Garys" in reference to the founders of Filmex who died in 1992.

== Release ==
A work-in-progress was screened at the Palm Springs Film Festival in January 1993.

Thirty-two years after its limited festival run, a 35mm print was discovered and the film was released for the first time to the public on DVD, Blu-ray and VOD by distributor Liberation Hall.

== Reception ==
Todd McCarthy of Variety called it a "microcosmic commentary on vaunted family values and media generation" and that it "features some of the best direction in any of [Bartel]'s films".
