= Whip Hubley =

American actor

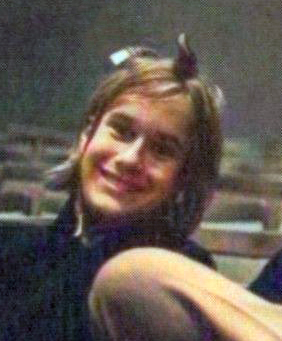
- Hubley in 1973
- Born: Grant Shelby Hubley, Jr. New York City, U.S.
- Education: University of Vermont
- Occupation: Actor
- Years active: 1985–present
- Spouse: Dinah Minot
- Children: 3
- Relatives: Season Hubley (sister); Susan Minot (sister-in-law)

Grant Shelby "Whip" Hubley Jr. is an American actor.

== Early life ==
Hubley was born in New York City, the son of Julia Kaul (née Paine) and Grant Shelby Hubley, an entrepreneur, oil investor, and writer. He attended the Buckley School for Boys in Upper East Side, Manhattan. As a resident of Montclair, New Jersey he attended Montclair Academy which then became part of Montclair Kimberley Academy, graduating in 1975. He is the brother of actress Season Hubley, also the former brother-in-law of Kurt Russell, and uncle of Season and Kurt's son, Boston Russell.

== Career ==
He played the role of Mischa in the 1987 film Russkies, and Hollywood in the 1986 film Top Gun. Hubley said when he first read the script for Top Gun, he thought it would be an ensemble film but producers focused the story around Maverick when they "realized what they had with Tom."

He later played Brian Hawkins in the Showtime miniseries More Tales of the City (1998) and its follow-up Further Tales of the City (2001). These miniseries were sequels to the PBS miniseries Tales of the City (1994), which starred Paul Gross in the role of Brian.

From 1995 to 2000, Hubley starred the lead role of Sheriff Tom Hampton on the TV revival of Flipper.

According to a 2022 interview with the Portland Press Herald, Whip Hubley works as a manager for a construction firm in Southern Maine and acts in local theater productions.

In April 2023, Hubley was randomly stopped by an officer of the South Portland Maine Police Department, in a good-natured call.

== Personal life ==
Hubley currently resides in South Portland, Maine, after spending over thirty years in Santa Monica, California. He is married to Dinah Minot, a former producer for Saturday Night Live. He met his wife while they were students at the University of Vermont. His wife is the sister of writer Susan Minot.

== Filmography ==
- 1985 St. Elmo's Fire as Raymond Slater
- 1985 Magnum, P.I. (TV series) as Stu (1 episode)
  - "Round and Around" TV Episode (as Grant Hubley)
- 1986 Firefighter (TV) as Lance
- 1986 Club Life (1986) as Herb
- 1986 North and South, Book II (TV miniseries) as Lieutenant Stephen Kent
- 1986 Top Gun as Lieutenant Rick 'Hollywood' Neven
- 1987 Russkies as Mischa
- 1988 I'll Be Home for Christmas (TV)
- 1989 Desperado: The Outlaw Wars (TV) as Charlie Cates
- 1989 The Cover Girl and the Cop (TV)
- 1989 Everybody's Baby: The Rescue of Jessica McClure (TV) as Robert O'Donnell
- 1989 Nasty Boys (TV pilot)
- 1989 A Connecticut Yankee in King Arthur's Court (TV)
- 1989–1991 Life Goes On (TV series) as Dr. Oliver Matthews
- 1991 Wife, Mother, Murderer (TV) as Lieutenant Gary Carroll
- 1992 Desire and Hell at Sunset Motel as Chester DeSoto
- 1992 Devlin (TV) as Sam Lord
- 1993 Lake Consequence (TV) as Jim
- 1993 Coneheads as F-16 Pilot
- 1993 Bounty Tracker as Ralston
- 1994 Babylon 5 (TV series) "Signs and Portents" as Raider #1
- 1994 Unveiled as Peter Masters
- 1994 Dead at 21 (TV series) as Agent Winston
- 1994 Someone Else's Child (TV) as Danny
- 1995 Species as John Carey
- 1994–1996 Murder, She Wrote (TV series) as Musician / Randy Jinks
- 1996 Executive Decision as Sergeant Baker
- 1995–2000 Flipper (TV series) as Tom Hampton
- 1996 A Very Brady Sequel as Explorer / Dead Husband
- 1996 Driven as Jason Schuyler
- 1996 Daddy's Girl as Mark Springer
- 1997 Black Scorpion II: Aftershock as Michael Russo
- 1997 Profiler (TV series) as Drew Brenneman
- 1998 The Secrets of My Heart as Parker
- 1998 More Tales of the City (mini TV series) as Brian Hawkins
- 1998 Mike Hammer, Private Eye (TV series) as Loolie / Julius Llewellyn Sterling
- 2000 Practice (TV series) as Craig Hansen
- 2000 The Fugitive (TV series) as Brian Collier
- 2001 Fangs as Dr. John Winslow
- 2001 The Division (TV series) as Scott Berwin
- 2001 Charmed (TV series) as Detective
- 2001 Further Tales of the City (mini TV series) as Brian Hawkins
- 2001 The District (TV series) as Agent Harris
- 2002 MDs (TV series) as Fetterhoff
- 2003 CSI: Miami (TV series) as Nick Gordon
- 2003 The Handler (TV series) as Detective Colman
- 2004 A Cinderella Story as Sam's Dad
- 2007 Brothel as Brian
- 2007 Murder 101: College Can Be Murder (TV) as Stuart Evans
- 2009 Homeland as Edward
- 2013 Drones as Colonel Wallace
