= Amazing Stories (1985 TV series) =

American anthology TV series (1985–1987)

- Genre: Anthology; Fantasy; Science-fiction; Comedy drama
- Created by: Steven Spielberg
- Developed by: Steven Spielberg; Joshua Brand; John Falsey
- Theme music composer: John Williams
- Country of origin: United States
- Original language: English
- No. of seasons: 2
- No. of episodes: 45

Production
- Executive producers: Steven Spielberg; Kathleen Kennedy; Frank Marshall
- Producer: David E. Vogel
- Running time: 24–46 minutes
- Production companies: Amblin Entertainment; Universal Television

Original release
- Network: NBC
- Release: September 29, 1985 – April 10, 1987

Related
- Family Dog; Amazing Stories (reboot series)

Amazing Stories is an American anthology television series created by Steven Spielberg, that originally ran on NBC in the United States from September 29, 1985, to April 10, 1987.

The series was nominated for 12 Emmy Awards and won five. The first-season episode "The Amazing Falsworth" earned writer Mick Garris an Edgar Award for Best Episode in a TV Series. It was not a ratings hit (ranking 40th in Season 1 and 52nd in Season 2), however, and the network did not renew it after the two-year contract expired. The 1987 science fiction film Batteries Not Included was originally intended as a story for Amazing Stories, but Spielberg liked the idea so much that it was made into a theatrical release.

The series title licensed the name of Amazing Stories, the first dedicated science fiction magazine created by Hugo Gernsback in April 1926.

The title sequence was made by computer-generated imagery (CGI) firm Robert Abel and Associates.

On March 6, 2020, a revival of Amazing Stories premiered on Apple TV+.

== Episodes ==
All episodes have a running time of around 24 minutes, with the exceptions of "The Mission" and "Go to the Head of the Class" (both running 46 minutes).

Season	Episodes	Originally released	
Season	Episodes	First released	Last released
1	24	September 29, 1985	May 25, 1986
2	21	September 22, 1986	April 10, 1987

=== Season 1 (1985–86) ===
No. overall	No. in season	Title	Directed by	Written by	Music by	Original release date
1	1	"Ghost Train"	Steven Spielberg	Story by : Steven Spielberg; Teleplay by : Frank Deese	John Williams	September 29, 1985
The elderly "Opa" Clyde Globe (Roberts Blossom) disapproves of his son Fenton (Scott Paulin) building a new country home on the site where he accidentally caused a train, the Highball Express, to derail 75 years ago. Opa believes that his destiny is to get on board the train when it comes back, telling his young grandson to be cautious as it will careen through the house. Also starring Gail Edwards, Lukas Haas, and Renny Roker.
2	2	"The Main Attraction"	Matthew Robbins	Story by : Steven Spielberg; Teleplay by : Brad Bird and Mick Garris	Craig Safan	October 6, 1985
High school jock Brad Bender (Scott Clough), in the running for Prom King and feeling too cool for the nerdy and persistent Shirley Crater (Lisa Jane Persky), is hit by a meteorite during a meteor shower, giving his body magnetic properties. Also starring Richard Bull, Barbara Sharma, and Brad Bird.
3	3	"Alamo Jobe"	Michael Moore	Story by : Steven Spielberg; Teleplay by : Joshua Brand & John Falsey	James Horner	October 20, 1985
During the Battle of the Alamo, 15-year-old messenger boy Jobe Farnum (Kelly Reno) is tasked with delivering a message from Colonel William Travis (William Boyett) to John Lefferts (Michael Cavanaugh). Before he is killed in a bout of crossfire, Jobe manages to travel through time to San Antonio, 1985, where he draws the attention of everyone around him as he tries to find Lefferts. Also starring Lurene Tuttle, Richard Young, Robert V. Barron and Benji Gregory.
4	4	"Mummy Daddy"	William Dear	Story by : Steven Spielberg; Teleplay by : Earl Pomerantz	Danny Elfman & Steve Bartek	October 27, 1985
Harold (Tom Harrison), an actor playing a mummy in a horror movie being filmed in the deep South, hears that his pregnant wife has gone into early labor. Unable to take his constricting costume off, he rushes to the hospital through any mode of transportation he can find. Some locals mistake him for Ra Amin Ka, an actual mummy of local legend, and form a posse to pursue him. What no one knows is that the actual Ra Amin Ka is also out and about. Also starring Bronson Pinchot, Brion James, Tracey Walter, William Frankfather, Larry Hankin, Len Lesser, Billy Beck, and Elden Henson.
5	5	"The Mission"	Steven Spielberg	Story by : Steven Spielberg; Teleplay by : Menno Meyjes	John Williams	November 3, 1985
Johnathan (Casey Siemaszko), a courageous ball turret gunner and aspiring cartoonist, is trapped in the belly gun of his company's Boeing B-17 (named "Friendly Persuasion") after a firefight. With the landing gear damaged, the only other way the plane can land is if the crew parachute out as it crashes, inevitably killing him. It's for this reason that Johnathan must rely on his imagination to get out of his predicament. Also starring Kevin Costner, Kiefer Sutherland, J.J. Cohen, and Peter Jason, with Anthony LaPaglia and Gary Riley in minor roles.
6	6	"The Amazing Falsworth"	Peter Hyams	Story by : Steven Spielberg; Teleplay by : Mick Garris	Billy Goldenberg	November 5, 1985
The Amazing Falsworth (Gregory Hines), a nightclub magician with psychic abilities, is able to see visions of a trenchcoat-clad person strangling two people with piano wire. Realizing that he's found the infamous Keyboard Killer, Falsworth's fears are intensified when the killer starts focusing exclusively on him. Also starring Richard Masur and Don Calfa.
7	7	"Fine Tuning"	Bob Balaban	Story by : Steven Spielberg; Teleplay by : Earl Pomerantz	Jonathan Tunick	November 10, 1985
For their science project, three high-schoolers, Andy, Jimmy, and George (Matthew Laborteaux, Gary Riley, and Jim Gatherum), manage to construct an antenna that can pick up interstellar transmissions. Through these transmissions, the trio discover a race of aliens (Debbie Lee Carrington, Daniel Frishman, Patty Maloney, and Kevin Thompson) that have modelled their entire civilization on 1950s television, and learn that these aliens are en route to Earth to meet some of their favorite stars. Also starring Milton Berle, Vance Colvig, Paul Garner, Happy Hall, and Angelo Rossitto.
8	8	"Mr. Magic"	Donald Petrie	Joshua Brand & John Falsey	Bruce Broughton	November 17, 1985
Lou Bundles (Sid Caesar), an aging, once-great illusionist, purchases a magical deck of playing cards to put on an amazing final show before he retires, but desperately tries to get them to perform tricks when they appear to lose the magic. Also starring Leo Rossi, Larry Gelman, and Julius Harris.
9	9	"Guilt Trip"	Burt Reynolds	Gail Parent & Kevin Parent	Steve Dorff	December 1, 1985
In a world where emotions are personified as human beings, the exhausted Guilt (Dom DeLuise) is made to take a cruise for a mandatory vacation, where he meets and grows attracted to Love (Loni Anderson), causing him to begin neglecting his important duties. Also starring Charles Durning, Charles Nelson Reilly, John Fiedler, Beverly Sanders, Carol Arthur and John D'Aquino.
10	10	"Remote Control Man"	Bob Clark	Story by : Steven Spielberg; Teleplay by : Douglas Lloyd McIntosh	Arthur B. Rubinstein	December 8, 1985
Walter Poindexter (Sydney Lassick), a henpecked, unhappy, and frustrated man dealing with his nagging wife Grendel (Nancy Parsons) and his incorrigible sons (Jeff Cohen and David Stone), uses TV to escape his miserable existence. When his wife sells his set for a new outfit, Walter buys a newer, more-unusual looking one at a peculiar electronics store. Walter finds that using the set's remote control allows him to bring any character onscreen into the real world, using it to respectively turn his abusive family into June Cleaver, Arnold Jackson, and "Face" (reprised by Barbara Billingsley, Gary Coleman, and Dirk Benedict). Things soon get out of hand when Walter's new "family" earns the ire of some loan sharks. Also starring Phil Bruns, Lyle Alzado, Jim Lange, Ed McMahon, LaWanda Page, Richard Simmons, Jake Steinfeld, Professor Tanaka and Sid Haig.
11	11	"Santa '85"	Phil Joanou	Story by : Steven Spielberg; Teleplay by : Joshua Brand & John Falsey	Thomas Newman	December 15, 1985
On Christmas Eve, Santa Claus (Douglas Seale) accidentally trips a couple's burglar alarm and is arrested by cynical sheriff Horace Smyvie (Pat Hingle), locked in a prison cell with a trio of drunks dressed like him. With no one believing Santa's claims of who he is, it falls to Bobby Mynes (Gabriel Damon), the 8-year-old son of the couple who had him arrested, to save Christmas by busting Santa out and/or restoring Horace's Christmas spirit. Also starring Frances Bay.
12	12	"Vanessa in the Garden"	Clint Eastwood	Steven Spielberg	Lennie Niehaus	December 29, 1985
In the 19th century, talented artist Byron Sullivan (Harvey Keitel) loses his beloved wife Vanessa (Sondra Locke) in a carriage accident. Driven to despair, Byron soon finds a way for Vanessa to live on through his artwork, making plans to paint an entire life for the pair of them. Also starring Beau Bridges.
13	13	"The Sitter"	Joan Darling	Story by : Joshua Brand & John Falsey; Teleplay by : Mick Garris	Kenneth Wannberg	January 5, 1986
Jennifer Mowbray (Mabel King), a babysitter from Jamaica, uses the powers of voodoo to get Lance and Dennis Paxton (Seth Green and Joshua Rudoy), the beleaguering and overactive brothers she's charged with looking after, under control. Also starring Wendy Phillips, Fran Ryan, and Michael Horse.
14	14	"No Day at the Beach"	Lesli Linka Glatter	Story by : Steven Spielberg; Teleplay by : Mick Garris	Leonard Rosenman	January 12, 1986
In World War II, Arnold Skamp (Larry Spinak), a GI rebuked by his fellow soldiers, becomes a war hero by saving them all with apparent miraculous abilities during the charge on Port Nuovo. Also starring Charlie Sheen, Ralph Seymour, and Philip McKeon.
15	15	"One for the Road"	Thomas Carter	James D. Bissell	Johnny Mandel	January 19, 1986
Based on the true story of Michael Malloy. During the Great Depression, Michael Malloy (Douglas Seale) is tricked into signing an insurance policy so Tony Maroni (Al Ruscio) and his fellow barflies can collect the money once he drinks himself to death, only to learn that they're dealing with much more than they expected. Also starring James Cromwell, Geoffrey Lewis, Joe Pantoliano, and Royal Dano.
16	16	"Gather Ye Acorns"	Norman Reynolds	Story by : Steven Spielberg; Teleplay by : Stu Krieger	Bruce Broughton	February 2, 1986
In the 1930s, an ancient tree troll (David Rappaport) encourages young Johnathan Quick (David Freedman) to pack his comic book collection and follow his dreams after his practical parents (Lois de Banzie and Royal Dano) disapprove of them. As the years roll on, things don't go well for the now-older Johnathan (Mark Hamill), but an opportunity approaches that may allow him to finally get a break. Also starring William Dear and Forest Whitaker.
17	17	"Boo!"	Joe Dante	Lowell Ganz & Babaloo Mandel	Jerry Goldsmith	February 16, 1986
Ditzy porn star Sheena Sepulveda (Wendy Schaal) and her sleazy husband Tony (Robert Picardo) move into a house they discover is haunted by the ghosts of its previous owners, the kind-hearted Nelson and Evelyn Chumsky (Eddie Bracken and Evelyn Keyes), who reluctantly try to scare their rude guests away. Also starring Bruce Davison and Taliesin Jaffe.
18	18	"Dorothy and Ben"	Thomas Carter	Story by : Steven Spielberg; Teleplay by : Michael De Guzman	Georges Delerue	March 2, 1986
Ben Dumfy (Joe Seneca), freshly-awoken from a 40-year coma, is able to mentally communicate with Dorothy (Natalie Gregory), a young girl who is similarly comatose.
19	19	"Mirror, Mirror"	Martin Scorsese	Story by : Steven Spielberg; Teleplay by : Joseph Minion	Michael Kamen	March 9, 1986
Horror novelist Jordan Manmouth (Sam Waterston), known for his huge ego and flagrant dismissal of the supernatural, is soon haunted by a phantom with a misshapen face (Tim Robbins), which appears in any reflective surface he looks at. Also starring Helen Shaver and Dick Cavett.
20	20	"Secret Cinema"	Paul Bartel	Paul Bartel	Billy Goldenberg	April 6, 1986
A young woman named Jane (Penny Peyser) thoroughly believes that her life is secretly being recorded, influenced, and filmed for an unknown audience. Also starring Paul Bartel, Mary Woronov, Griffin Dunne, Eve Arden, Richard Paul and Barry Dennen. Note: This episode is a remake of Bartel's 1968 short of the same name.
21	21	"Hell Toupée"	Irvin Kershner	Gail Parent & Kevin Parent	David Shire	April 13, 1986
Balding accountant Murray Bernstein (E. Hampton Beagle) recently purchased a hairpiece that drove him to murder three lawyers, prompting inept defense attorney Harry Ballentine (Tony Kientz) to grow fearful with his new client. Also starring Cindy Morgan and James Avery.
22	22	"The Doll"	Phil Joanou	Richard Matheson	Georges Delerue	May 4, 1986
The shy and lonely John Walters (John Lithgow) buys a special doll, handcrafted by a mysterious German toymaker (Albert Hague), for his niece Doris (Rain Phoenix). While Doris is less than thrilled by the doll, her uncle embarks on a search for the woman who modelled for it, leading him to the equally lonely teacher Mary Dickenson (Anne Helm). Note: Matheson had written this script for the original The Twilight Zone where it was rejected by William Froug. After being invited to contribute to Amazing Stories, Matheson showed producers the unused script which in turn led them to secure the rights.
23	23	"One for the Books"	Lesli Linka Glatter	Richard Matheson	Glenn Paxton	May 11, 1986
Elderly college janitor Fred (Leo Penn) finds that his brain can instantly absorb any fact of any subject taught in any classroom he cleans. When this discovery becomes public, he becomes subject to a heated debate among campus professors Rand, Gilbert, and Smith (John Alvin, Gary Berghen, and Ben Kronen) about the abilities and limitations of human intellect, proving to be more than he can handle. Also starring Joyce Van Patten.
24	24	"Grandpa's Ghost"	Timothy Hutton	Story by : Timothy Hutton; Teleplay by : Michael De Guzman	Pat Metheny	May 25, 1986
Edwin (Andrew McCarthy) learns that his grandfather, Charlie (Ian Wolfe), very recently died in his sleep, yet that doesn't stop the old man from hanging around his apartment, playing the piano, and swapping stories with his grandmother. Also starring Herta Ware.

=== Season 2 (1986–87) ===
No. overall	No. in season	Title	Directed by	Written by	Music by	Original release date
25	1	"The Wedding Ring"	Danny DeVito	Story by : Steven Spielberg; Teleplay by : Stu Krieger	Craig Safan	September 22, 1986
Wax-museum dresser Herbert (Danny DeVito) takes a ring from a statue and gives it to his wife Lois (Rhea Perlman) as an anniversary present, which turns her into a wicked seductress. Also starring Louis Giambalvo, David Byrd, and Tracey Walter.
26	2	"Miscalculation"	Tom Holland	Michael McDowell	Phil Marshall	September 29, 1986
While fooling around in chemistry class, luckless-in-love college student Phil (Jon Cryer) spills a chemical element on a picture of a puppy, and brings it to life. He tries using this chemical to bring his pornographic magazines and pin-ups to life so he can finally have a girlfriend, but the results are both surprising and horrifying. Also starring JoAnn Willette, J.J. Cohen, Lana Clarkson, Galyn Görg, and Rebecca Schaeffer.
27	3	"Magic Saturday"	Robert Markowitz	Richard Christian Matheson	Ralph Burns	October 6, 1986
10-year-old Mark (Taliesin Jaffe) adores his grandfather "Stormin' Norman" (M. Emmet Walsh), who tells him stories and plays baseball with him every Saturday. When "Norman" soon falls ill, Mark uses a magic spell that allows them to swap bodies so the old man can treat him to one last ball game. Also starring Jeff Cohen.
28	4	"Welcome to My Nightmare"	Todd Holland	Todd Holland	Bruce Broughton	October 13, 1986
Teenage horror film buff Harry (David Hollander) has become the subject of concern from his family (Sharon Spelman, Robert L. Gibson, Christina Applegate, and Parker Jacobs) for how out of touch with reality he is, even declining a date offer from a new girl in town (Robyn Lively). Angry that the real world is so dull, Harry wishes he was in the movies, resulting in him being transported to the set of Psycho, where the blood-curdling nature of a certain scene leaves him scrambling to get back to the real world.
29	5	"You Gotta Believe Me"	Kevin Reynolds	Story by : Steven Spielberg; Teleplay by : Stu Krieger	Brad Fiedel	October 20, 1986
Earl Sweet (Charles Durning) races against time as he tries to prevent a Boeing 747 he saw in a nightmare from crashing, just as it did in said nightmare. Also starring Wil Shriner, Richard Burns, and Tim Russ.
30	6	"The Greibble"	Joe Dante	Story by : Steven Spielberg; Teleplay by : Mick Garris	John Addison	November 3, 1986
Harried housewife Joan Simmons (Hayley Mills) encounters a large furry creature (performed by Don McLeod, vocal effects provided by Frank Welker) during a storm, which causes havoc with its appetite for inanimate objects. Also starring Dick Miller.
31	7	"Life on Death Row"	Mick Garris	Story by : Mick Garris; Teleplay by : Rockne S. O'Bannon	Fred Steiner	November 10, 1986
Eric David Peterson (Patrick Swayze), an inmate on death row, is struck by lightning hours before his execution, and finds that he has been given miraculous healing powers. Also starring James T. Callahan, Kevin Hagen, and Héctor Elizondo.
32	8	"Go to the Head of the Class"	Robert Zemeckis	Story by : Mick Garris; Teleplay by : Mick Garris & Tom McLoughlin and Bob Gale	Alan Silvestri	November 21, 1986
High school student Peter Brand (Scott Coffey), utterly obsessed with his sexy classmate Cynthia Simpson (Mary Stuart Masterson), helps his crush cast a spell on their sadistic and tyrannical English teacher B.O. Beanes (Christopher Lloyd), but black magic only seems to make Beanes more powerful. Also starring Tom Bresnahan and Billy Beck.
33	9	"Thanksgiving"	Todd Holland	Story by : Harold Rolseth; Teleplay by : Pierre R. Debs & Robert C. Fox	Bruce Broughton	November 24, 1986
On Thanksgiving, the mean-spirited Calvin (David Carradine) and his stepdaughter Dora (Kyra Sedgwick) find treasure in a dry well which is believed to be inhabited by a race of "hole people", which trade this treasure in exchange for things, specifically food. Based on Rolseth's 1971 short story "Hey, You Down There!".
34	10	"The Pumpkin Competition"	Norman Reynolds	Peter Z. Orton	John Addison	December 1, 1986
The rich and miserly Elma Dinnock (Polly Holliday) gains a secret from mysterious botanist Bertram Carver (J. A. Preston) to win the Yarborough Country pumpkin-growing contest against her rival Mildred (June Lockhart) after 22 years of losing to her. Also starring Ritch Brinkley and Joshua Rudoy.
35	11	"What If...?"	Joan Darling	Anne Spielberg	Billy Goldenberg	December 8, 1986
Little Jonah Kelley (Jake Hart) starts seeing things randomly disappearing to the point where the house becomes sterile, and worries why his status-seeking parents Pamela and Raymond (Clare Kirkconnell and Tom McConnell) are more concerned with their social lives than they are with his problems. An explanation for this phenomenon is only revealed when he meets an expectant mother at a toy store. Also starring Dennis Haskins and Michael Horse.
36	12	"The Eternal Mind"	J. Michael Riva	Julie Moskowitz & Gary Stephens	Miles Goodman	December 29, 1986
Dying scientist John Baldwin (Jeffrey Jones) becomes the first human subject of a test that merges man and machine. The results of this action, unfortunately, bring John unexpected heartaches. Also starring Katherine Borowitz and Robert Axelrod.
37	13	"Lane Change"	Ken Kwapis	Ali Marie Matheson	Jimmy Webb	January 12, 1987
Charlene Benton (Kathy Baker), driving on a stormy night while approaching divorce, gets glimpses of her past through the windshield after she picks up a stranded woman (Priscilla Pointer) along the way.
38	14	"Blue Man Down"	Paul Michael Glaser	Story by : Steven Spielberg; Teleplay by : Jacob Epstein & Daniel Lindley	Brad Fiedel	January 19, 1987
Duncan Moore (Max Gail), a police officer who lost his young partner DeSoto (Chris Nash) in a supermarket shootout and remains surrounded by the guilt, regains his confidence with the help of his new partner Patty O'Neil (Kate McNeil), a woman who appears invisible to everyone else. Also starring Sal Viscuso and Richard Epcar.
39	15	"The 21-Inch Sun"	Nick Castle	Bruce Kirschbaum	Ralph Burns	February 2, 1987
Sitcom scriptwriter Billy Burliss (Robert Townsend), suffering from writer's block, discovers that one of his houseplants has become sentient after absorbing the rays from a TV set. Since the plant, which chose the name "Lucy", also gained a sense of humour this way, Billy begins using the plant as a ghostwriter. Also starring Michael Lerner and Craig Richard Nelson.
40	16	"Family Dog"	Brad Bird	Brad Bird	Danny Elfman & Steve Bartek	February 16, 1987
The show's only animated episode, serving as the backdoor pilot to the cartoon series of the same name. A dog (voiced by Brad Bird) goes through life with his new family (voiced by Stan Freberg, Annie Potts, Scott Menville, and Brooke Ashley) in three separate vignettes. Also starring the voices of Jack Angel, Marshall Efron, Mercedes McCambridge, and Stanley Ralph Ross. Note: The episode was produced over a 10-month span utilizing a team of 11 animators and 10 assistants on a $1 million budget. The original ending of the obedience school vignette was supposed to end with the father angrily booting the dog out of the house, but producer Steven Spielberg made the decision while Bird was on vacation to instead end the segment with the dog attacking the father as he felt the dog should win in the end.
41	17	"Gershwin's Trunk"	Paul Bartel	Paul Bartel & John Meyer	John Mayer	March 13, 1987
Jo-Jo Gillespie (Bob Balaban), a Broadway lyricist/composer desperate to deliver a hit musical, seeks inspiration from the spirit of George Gershwin (Dana Gladstone), summoned from the dead by psychic Sister Teresa (Lainie Kazan). Rumors begin speculating that the phenomenal music Jo-Jo produces isn't his, prompting Jo-Jo to do anything to protect his secret. Also starring John McCook, Paul Bartel and Carrie Fisher.
42	18	"Such Interesting Neighbors"	Graham Baker	Story by : Jack Finney; Teleplay by : Mick Garris & Tom McLoughlin	David Newman	March 20, 1987
The Lewise family, Al, Nel, and Randy (Frederick Coffin, Marcia Strassman and Ian Fried), suspect that their new neighbors, Ann, Ted, and Brad Hellenbeck (Victoria Caitlin, Adam Ant, and Ryan McWhorter), are behind various disturbances in the neighborhood, such as mysterious animals, sudden earthquakes, and time to start warping and repeating.
43	19	"Without Diana"	Lesli Linka Glatter	Mick Garris	Georges Delerue	March 27, 1987
George Willoughby (Billy "Green" Bush) and his dying wife Kathryn (Dianne Hull) are comforted by Diana (Gennie James), the daughter they had lost in the woods 40 years ago, and never stopped believing would appear one last time before they passed on.
44	20	"Moving Day"	Robert Stevens	Frank Kerr	David Shire	April 3, 1987
Alan Webster (Stephen Geoffreys) learns that he and his parents, Mara and Val (Mary Ellen Trainor and Dennis Lipscomb) are moving. Alan is understandably upset with this major change, but is surprised to learn that they intend to move to the planet Alturus, 85 billion miles from Earth.
45	21	"Miss Stardust"	Tobe Hooper	Story by : Richard Matheson; Teleplay by : Thomas E. Szollosi & Richard Christian Matheson	John Mayer	April 10, 1987
A sentient plant-like alien known as "Cabbage Man" ("Weird Al" Yankovic) threatens to destroy Earth if the Miss Stardust beauty pageant doesn't allow contestants from other worlds to compete. This causes public relations worker Joe Willoughby (Dick Shawn) to give in to his demands, and hurriedly allow interplanetary beings to compete in the pageant. Also starring Laraine Newman, Rick Overton, Jack Carter, James Karen, Jim Siedow, and Angel Tompkins.

== Production ==
=== Development ===
The series came from Steven Spielberg's desire to use his ideas and short stories that were not substantial enough to support feature films and to return to work in television, having fond memories of his start in the medium directing episodes of Night Gallery, Marcus Welby, M.D., and Columbo, and the television movie Duel. The title of the series came from the science fiction magazine of the same name. With the introduction of producer Gary David Goldberg, Spielberg met with Grant Tinker and Brandon Tartikoff of NBC; after Spielberg outlined his conditions for the series (including avoiding using his name for promotion following the premiere and placement in the 8 p.m. Sunday Night timeslot), NBC gave Amazing Stories a then-unprecedented commitment of 44 episodes over a two year period, as Spielberg didn't want to do the series without a guaranteed second season with which to adjust any flaws between seasons.

The series had a budget of $750,000 to $1 million per half-hour episode, higher than the average hour long TV budget, $900,000 per episode, and double that of concurrent half-hour programs such as Cheers and Family Ties, $350,000-400,000 per episode. Questioned about the nature of the deal, Tartikoff responded that they wanted to give Spielberg the most comfortable creative environment possible as they felt Amazing Stories had the potential to be hit for the network. Spielberg's intention with the show was to create an all-ages program emphasizing wonderment, fantasy, irony and comedy, whilst sidestepping more scary or macabre stories (though some would still be produced, but would be broadcast later in the evening if Spielberg deemed them "too intense" for family viewing). While Spielberg expressed admiration for prior anthology TV series, he wanted to avoid the "moralizing" seen in the original The Twilight Zone.

Spielberg's heavy hands-on involvement in the series lead to rumors that no Amazing Stories episodes would be screened for critics and the no clips from the series would be used in promos, both of which Spielberg denied; though the first two episodes were held back when Spielberg adopted a similar approach to how he handled his film releases. Spielberg wanted one third of the series directors to be newcomers, as he felt the series could serve as a good training ground for writers and directors; thanks to Spielberg's reputation, established directors such as Clint Eastwood and Martin Scorsese also agreed to direct, as they'd wanted to work with Spielberg. Peter Weir had wanted to direct a segment, but due to scheduling conflicts with The Mosquito Coast this ultimately never came to be. NBC hoped to build a Sunday night block around Amazing Stories that would be able to beat out CBS, who had claimed the number one spot for Sunday night during the previous television season with their block of 60 Minutes, Murder, She Wrote, Crazy Like a Fox, and Trapper John, M.D..

=== Season One ===
In the lead up to the series premiere, Amazing Stories was noted for the high level of secrecy Spielberg demanded of the production - it the only major series not to be screened by TV critics during the Upfronts for the 1985–86 television season. Spielberg defended his limited pre-release publicity for Amazing Stories, citing the approach he'd taken for the successful E.T. the Extra-Terrestrial as well as his belief that pre-release info for films is detrimental to audiences, leaving them feeling they'd already seen what's being promoted. Spielberg also refused to do interviews for the show and instituted a rule that he would not give interviews on the series until 19 episodes of the first season had aired. The premiere episode, the Spielberg-directed "Ghost Train", was a decent sized hit that managed to pull in one third of the television viewing audience, beaten only by CBS' Murder, She Wrote, but word of mouth saw ratings rapidly decline until the series ranked 40th out of 67 series.

Season one story editor Mick Garris blamed the lukewarm reception on unrealistic audience expectations of moments comparable to those in Spielberg's films, and contrasted the internal enthusiasm for "Ghost Train" against the public's ire and derision. According to Garris, Spielberg had final say on every script, with Garris' job primarily rewriting the scripts to match Spielberg's specifications, leading to Spielberg having a "Story by' credit on 16 of the season's 22 episodes. In a November 1986 article for the Los Angeles Times, it was reported that a "story checklist" developed by Spielberg's office was handed out to writers detailing what the story editors would be looking for. The checklist included:

Story Checklist

Element	Description	Source
A GOAL WE CARE ABOUT	Whatever drives the protagonist should be meaningful to us.	
FAMILY ORIENTED	Are the incidents in the story appropriate for the "family hour"?	
UPBEAT	Is the story upbeat? Does it have a happy ending?	
AMAZING	Is there something that makes the story truly "amazing," not merely interesting?	
EARLY MAGIC	Is the "amazing element" introduced quickly, at least by the end of Act I?	
A "DROP" OF FANTASY	Is there only one element of magic, and everything else played as close to reality as possible?	

=== Season Two ===
Following the middling performance of season one, Spielberg agreed to take a less hands-on approach to season two: authoring fewer stories, taking less of a role in reworking scripts, a less juvenile tone, and allowing a panel of writers and producers to be brought in on a consulting basis, including Richard Matheson, Robert Zemeckis, and Garris. Tartikoff also blamed Amazing Stories under performance on its pairing with the revival of Alfred Hitchcock Presents on Sunday nights, as parents looking for an "electronic babysitter" for their children were taken aback by the colorful whimsy-filled fantasies presented in Amazing Stories that would then segue into stories of murder on Alfred Hitchcock Presents, with parents opting to put on ABC's Wonderful World of Disney, which aired before Alfred Hitchcock Presents for uninterrupted family viewing, meaning that Amazing Stories target audience was being siphoned off. As a result, when Amazing Stories returned for a second season Alfred Hitchcock Presents was cancelled by NBC (though later revived by USA Network for an additional three seasons).

In an attempt to improve the writing quality of the show, twice as many scripts were ordered for season two, with the logic that increasing the order would lead to a greater yield of high quality scripts after culling the inferior ones. The additional scripts were acquired at the expense of both Spielberg and Universal Television, as NBC had already made a sizable commitment with a two season order and $1 million per episode budget. The behind the scenes changes were unable to stem the downward trend in viewership, with the series falling to 62nd place, and NBC cancelled the series after the completion of its two year commitment.

== Soundtrack ==
In 1999, Varèse Sarabande released a CD containing a rerecording of the scores for the episodes "The Mission" and "Dorothy and Ben" (John Williams and Georges Delerue respectively) plus Williams' opening and closing themes, performed by the Royal Scottish National Orchestra and conducted by Joel McNeely.

In 2006–2007, Intrada released three volumes of original music from the series, covering the impressive lineup of composers who worked on it and featuring all of the most noteworthy scores (with the exception of Danny Elfman and Steve Bartek's "The Family Dog," because the masters could not be found – a brief suite is on Music for a Darkened Theatre: Vol. 2, however), as well as two alternate versions of Williams' main title theme, one used just once (Alternate #1, on "Alamo Jobe") and the other never used. The album is also notable for the premiere release of the music Williams composed for the Amblin Entertainment logo (although the logo music is not heard on the show itself).

Other than Williams, Bruce Broughton and Billy Goldenberg are the only composers to be represented on all three volumes. The running times below indicate the cumulative time for each score rather than the time of each track. (The series theme is not quoted in any of the episode scores, with the exception of "Ghost Train.")

Volume 1 (2006)

CD1:

- Amazing Stories Main Title – John Williams (1:02)
- Ghost Train – John Williams (15:45)
- Alamo Jobe – James Horner (10:01)
- Gather Ye Acorns – Bruce Broughton (18:37)
- The Doll – Georges Delerue (10:09)
- The Amazing Falsworth – Billy Goldenberg (8:47)

CD2:

- Amazing Stories Bumper #1 – John Williams (:04)
- Moving Day – David Shire (13:41)
- Without Diana – Georges Delerue (12:39)
- Mummy, Daddy – Danny Elfman & Steve Bartek (13:26)
- Vanessa in the Garden – Lennie Niehaus (13:23)
- Welcome to My Nightmare – Bruce Broughton (16:04)
- Amazing Stories End Credits – John Williams (:29)
- Amblin Logo – John Williams (:15)

Volume Two (2006)

CD 1:

- Amazing Stories Main Title Alternate #1 – John Williams (1:03)
- Boo! – Jerry Goldsmith (12:13)
- What If...? – Billy Goldenberg (12:32)
- Dorothy and Ben – Georges Delerue (10:10)
- The Main Attraction – Craig Safan (12:09)
- Such Interesting Neighbors – David Newman (17:13)
- Thanksgiving – Bruce Broughton (12:14)

CD 2:

- Amazing Stories Bumper #2 – John Williams (:04)
- Hell Toupee – David Shire (13:41)
- One for the Road – Johnny Mandel (8:40)
- The Remote Control Man – Arthur B. Rubinstein (12:53)
- The Greibble – John Addison (15:43)
- No Day at the Beach – Leonard Rosenman (11:04)
- Santa '85 – Thomas Newman (13:05)
- Amazing Stories End Credits – John Williams (:29)
- Amblin Logo (Christmas Version) – John Williams (:15)

Volume Three (2007)

CD 1:

- Amazing Stories Main Title Alternate #2 – John Williams (1:03)
- Go to the Head of the Class – Alan Silvestri (26:58)
- The Wedding Ring – Craig Safan (12:51)
- Mirror, Mirror – Michael Kamen (24:56)
- Mr. Magic – Bruce Broughton (12:50)

CD 2:

- Amazing Stories Bumper #1 – John Williams (:04)
- Secret Cinema – Billy Goldenberg (7:56)
- Life on Death Row – Fred Steiner (13:57)
- The Pumpkin Competition – John Addison (14:29)
- Grandpa's Ghost – Pat Metheny (11:06)
- The Mission – John Williams (29:55)
- Amazing Stories End Credits – John Williams (:29)
- Amblin Logo (Alternate) – John Williams (:15)

== Reception ==
The series gained a number of positive reviews. However, some reviewers were unimpressed with the show, with Jeff Jarvis of People saying "Amazing Stories is one of the worst disappointments I've ever had watching TV."

=== Primetime Emmy Awards ===
Year	Category	Nominee(s)	Episode	Result
1986	Outstanding Directing for a Drama Series	Steven Spielberg	"The Mission"	Nominated
1986	Outstanding Guest Actor in a Drama Series	John Lithgow	"The Doll"	Won
1986	Outstanding Cinematography for a Series	John McPherson	"The Mission"	Won
1986	Outstanding Achievement in Costuming for a Series	Sanford Slepak, Carol Hybi, Daniel Grant North, Deahdra Scarano	"Ghost Train"	Nominated
1986	Outstanding Makeup for a Series	Joseph Roveto, Jane Ruhm, James Cullen, Fran Vega-Buck	"Gather Ye Acorns"	Nominated
1986	Outstanding Hairstyling for a Series	Bunny Parker	"Gather Ye Acorns"	Won
1986	Outstanding Sound Editing for a Series	Richard L. Anderson, Wayne Allwine, James Christopher, George Fredrick, John Stacy, Burton Weinstein, Lettie Odney, Denise Whiting, Kenneth Wannberg	"The Mission"	Won
1986	Outstanding Costuming for a Series	Joseph Roveto, Jane Ruhm, James Cullen, Fran Vega-Buck	"Gather Ye Acorns"	Nominated
1986	Outstanding Editing for a Series – Single Camera Production	Joe Ann Fogle	"Mummy, Daddy"	Nominated
	Outstanding Editing for a Series – Single Camera Production	Steven Kemper	"The Mission"	Nominated
1987	Outstanding Makeup for a Series	Michael Westmore, Mark Bussan, Chuck House, Fred C. Blau Jr.	"Without Diana"	Won
1987	Outstanding Cinematography for a Series	John McPherson	"Go to the Head of the Class"	Nominated

== Spin-offs ==
One episode of the show, "Family Dog", was spun off into its own series. Six years after Amazing Stories finished its run, Family Dog ran on CBS for ten episodes before being pulled off the schedule.

The video game The Dig originated as an idea Spielberg had for Amazing Stories, but decided it would be too expensive to film.

In 1986, Steven Bauer wrote two novelizations of the series which were both published by Charter Books in the US and Futura Books in the UK. The first book, Steven Spielberg's Amazing Stories (October 1986, ISBN 0-441-01906-4), adapted episodes 5, 12, 9, 2, 7 and 12, while the second book, Volume II of Steven Spielberg's Amazing Stories (December 1986, ISBN 0-441-01912-9), adapted episodes 7, 20, 8, 11, 18, 25, 4, 3, 21, 17 and 19.

In 1985–86, TSR published six tie-in novels under the Amazing Stories banner. They were branching (Choose Your Own Adventure style) books where the reader chose where to jump at key points.

1. The 4-D Funhouse by Clayton Emery and Earl Wajenberg. Cover by Jeff Easley. ISBN 0-394-74176-5
2. Jaguar! by Morris Simon. Cover by Jeff Easley. ISBN 0-88038-256-2
3. Portrait in Blood by Mary L. Kirchoff (credited as Mary Kirchoff). Cover by Jeff Easley. ISBN 0-88038-258-9
4. Nightmare Universe by Gene DeWeese and Robert Coulson. Cover by Jeff Easley. ISBN 0-88038-259-7
5. Starskimmer by John Betancourt. Cover by Doug Chaffee.
6. Day of the Mayfly by Lee Enderlin. Cover by Doug Chaffee.

The 1987 film Batteries Not Included was originally planned to be a segment for the series under the title Gramps and Grammie and Company, but Spielberg thought the story would work better on the big screen instead of television.

== Reboot ==
On October 23, 2015, it was announced that NBC was developing a reboot of the series with Bryan Fuller writing the pilot episode and executive producing alongside Justin Falvey and Darryl Frank. Production companies involved with the series were set to include Universal Television. Steven Spielberg was not expected to be involved with the new series. On May 5, 2017, NBC and Universal Television were formally notified that their option rights to the Amazing Stories properties had been withdrawn. Rights for the development of a genre television series under the name Amazing Stories were subsequently sold to Experimenter Media LLC.

On October 10, 2017, it was announced that Apple Inc. made a deal with Steven Spielberg's Amblin Television and NBC Universal to develop a new, ten-episode series on Apple's streaming service, Apple TV+. On February 7, 2018, it was announced that Fuller had stepped down as showrunner of the series over creative differences. It was further reported that it was unclear whether he would have a different role on the project going forward. He had not delivered a script to Apple before his amicable departure. Later that day, it was also announced that executive producer Hart Hanson was exiting the series as well. On May 22, 2018, it was announced that Once Upon a Time creators Edward Kitsis and Adam Horowitz had joined the production as executive producers and showrunners.

== Home media ==
=== VHS ===
A selection of the original series episodes were released in the VHS format in 1993; these were titled "Book One" through "Book Five" in the US. In Japan and Europe episodes were cut together as movies and released in 8 volumes during the late 1980s, early 1990s. A three-tape VHS (PAL) set was released in the UK in 2001.

Europe/Japan VHS series

- Amazing Stories: The Movie (1987) - contains "The Mission", "Mummy Daddy" and "Go To The Head Of The Class"
- Amazing Stories II (1987) - contains "The Amazing Falsworth", "Ghost Train" and "The Wedding Ring"
- Amazing Stories III (1988) - contains "The Griebble", "Moving Day" and "Miscalculation"
- Amazing Stories IV (1988) - contains "Dorothy And Ben", "Family Dog" and "The Main Attraction"
- Amazing Stories V (1989) - contains "The Doll", "Thanksgiving" and "Life On Death Row"
- Amazing Stories VI (1989) - contains "Mirror, Mirror", "Blue Man Down" and "Mr Magic"
- Amazing Stories VII (1990) - contains "The 21-Inch Sun", "Magic Saturday", "You Gotta Believe Me" and "One Amazing Night (Santa '85)"
- Amazing Stories VIII (1990) - contains "The Pumpkin Competition", "Without Diana" and "Fine Tuning"

US VHS series

- Amazing Stories: Book One (1993) - contains "The Mission" and "The Wedding Ring"
- Amazing Stories: Book Two (1993) - contains "Go To The Head Of The Class" and "Family Dog"
- Amazing Stories: Book Three (1993) - contains "Life On Death Row", "The Amazing Falsworth" and "No Day At The Beach"
- Amazing Stories: Book Four (1993) - contains "Mirror Mirror", "Mr Magic" and "Blue Man Down"
- Amazing Stories: Book Five (1993) - contains "The Pumpkin Competition", "Without Diana" and "Fine Tuning"

=== DVD ===
Between 2006 and 2009, The Complete First Season was released on DVD in the US, UK, France, Holland, Italy, Scandinavia, Spain and Australia. In 2009, both seasons were released in Germany and Japan only. In Germany both seasons were released as 12 separate DVDs or a complete box set, which was also reissued in 2011. All countries' DVDs contain the original English soundtrack, while Italy, Germany, France, Spain and Japan have a second soundtrack, dubbed in their respective languages. The second season was never released in any video format in America despite much demand by collectors.

=== Apple iTunes ===
On January 8, 2018, Seasons 1 and 2 were released on Apple iTunes in standard definition.

== Foreign broadcasts ==
In 1992, the series was somewhat erratically screened in Britain by BBC1 and BBC2 – billed in the Radio Times as "Steven Spielberg's Amazing Stories" – with episodes airing at any time from early on Sunday morning (such as "The Family Dog") to weekday evenings (like "Such Interesting Neighbors") to very late at night (for instance "Mirror, Mirror"); it later received a more coherent run on Sci-Fi. Three of the episodes ("The Mission", "Mummy Daddy" and "Go to the Head of the Class") were packaged together as an anthology film and released theatrically in several European countries such as Spain, France (July 10, 1986) or Finland (June 26, 1987), and also in Australia on September 17, 1987. It later appeared on LaserDisc in Japan as Amazing Stories: The Movie shortly afterwards.

Until 2006, the Sci Fi Channel in the United States showed episodes on an irregular schedule. The MoviePlex channel also showed the series as a collection of "movies," which are blocks of three episodes.

== American TV movies/home video compilations ==
Following the broadcast of Amazing Stories, in 1992 a series of six compilation films were produced by editing episodes together into feature length installments. The first compilation titled Amazing Stories: The Movie was given a theatrical release in international markets by Cinema International Corporation and was released in broadcast syndication in the United States. The films were also released on home video on VHS and LaserDisc.

Films

Title	Episodes contained	Source
Amazing Stories: The Movie	"The Mission" and "Go to the Head of the Class"	
Amazing Stories: The Movie II	"Santa ('85)", "The Wedding Ring", "Ghost Train" and "The Doll"	
Amazing Stories: The Movie III	"Mummy Daddy", "Family Dog", "Remote Control Man" and "Guilt Trip"	
Amazing Stories: The Movie IV	"Life on Death Row", "Mirror Mirror", "The Amazing Falsworth" and "Vanessa In The Garden"	
Amazing Stories: The Movie V	"The Sitter", "Grandpa's Ghost", "Dorothy and Ben" and "Gershwin's Trunk"	
Amazing Stories: The Movie IV	"The Main Attraction", "Gather Ye Acorns", "You Gotta Believe Me" and "Lane Change"	
