= Desire and Hell at Sunset Motel =

- Directed by: Alien Castle
- Written by: Alien Castle
- Produced by: Donald P. Borchers
- Starring: Sherilyn Fenn; Whip Hubley; David Hewlett; David Johansen; Paul Bartel
- Cinematography: Jamie Thompson
- Edited by: James Gavin Bedford
- Music by: Alien Castle; Doug Walter
- Production companies: Heron Communications; Image Organization
- Release dates: December 31, 1991 (UK); April 24, 1992 (United States)
- Running time: 90 minutes
- Country: United States
- Language: English

Desire and Hell at Sunset Motel is a 1991 neo-noir black comedy written and directed by Alien Castle and produced by Donald P. Borchers. It stars Sherilyn Fenn, Whip Hubley, David Hewlett, David Johansen, and Paul Bartel. It was partly filmed at the deserted Flamingo West Motel in Santa Monica.

== Plot ==
In 1955, a toy salesman and his wife turn a business trip into a brief vacation by planning to visit Disneyland, which has just opened. They stay at the Sunset Motel in Anaheim, California, where affairs and sexual crimes among the motel guests and staff quickly develop and cause trouble.

== Cast ==
- Sherilyn Fenn as Bridget "Bridey" DeSoto
- Whip Hubley as Chester DeSoto
- David Hewlett as Deadpan Winchester
- David Johansen as Auggie
- Kenneth Tobey as Captain Holiday
- Paul Bartel as The Manager
- Parker Whitman as The Boss
- Shannon Sturges as Louella

== Production ==
The film was originally almost made starring Esai Morales and Craig Sheffer. Producer Donald Borchers offered to help the original producer finance if they co produced but they turned it down. Finance fell through and Borchers took over the project.

The film was shot at a motel at Santa Monica. Donald Borchers said the film was gong to be released theatrically through Miramax but then Miramax got involved in a lawsuit with Media Home Entertainment. Borchers decided to open the film theatrically himself, using his fee for the movie for that purpose. He said the film opened the weekend of the Rodney King riots, which killed its chances of a successful theatrical release. He called the movie "a treasure of a picture. Alien Castle wrote one of the best black comedies you'd ever want to see. Sherilyn Fenn knocked it out of the park".

== Critical reception ==
The Los Angeles Times called it "a would be comic sexy thriller paced like a tipped bottle of ketchup, it keeps coming at you in waves."

LA Weekly called it "an arch, visually dazzling and thoroughly enjoyable melange of lasciviousness and murder."

A review for TV Guide stated the film "strives for a jokey, stylistically dense parody of 1950s potboilers, but fails completely. Castle, with clunky direction and a badly paced over-the-top screenplay containing dialogue dipped in a curious amalgam of Somerset Maugham and James Elroy ('They say radioactive things have a half life as they decay. I think I'm radioactive'), is seemingly unable to muster enough energy or inspiration to take advantage of Jamie Thompson's impressively evocative cinematography." In his review for Empire, William Thomas wrote, "Twin Peaks' Audrey Horne (Sherilyn Fenn) is the provocative heart of this strange, shambling and daft dialogue-heavy black comedy, which tries very hard, but doesn’t quite hit the mark."
