= Hey, You Down There! =

Short story by Harold Rolseth

- Short story by Harold Rolseth
- Country: United States
- Language: English, French
- Genre: Short story

Publication
- Published in: Yankee
- Media type: Print, magazine
- Publication date: November 1971

"Hey, You Down There!" is a short story by Harold Rolseth, first published in Yankee in 1971 with the subtitle "A different kind of Thanksgiving story". It received an award from the Council for Wisconsin Writers.

== Plot summary ==
Dora Spender and her abusive husband Calvin are digging a well on their farm. As Calvin digs, the ground drops away beneath him, revealing a thousand foot deep hole. Calvin lowers a rope into the hole with a flashlight tied to the end; when he withdraws it, the flashlight has been replaced with a one pound gold bar and a note bearing writing that Calvin cannot understand. Surmising that the hole leads to a "secret government project", Calvin leaves to buy more flashlights to exchange for gold.

While Calvin is away, Dora lowers a bucket into the hole with an English dictionary along with bread and ham. When she withdraws the bucket, it has been filled with a dozen gold bars, along with a note written in English. Signed by "Glar, the Master", the imperiously written note explains that Glar's scientists have been able to decipher Dora's "barbaric" language using the dictionary, and that sunlight is deadly to his people. Glar states that the flashlight and bread are worthless to his people, but that the ham is "beyond price", requesting that she sent down more in exchange for gold. As Dora buries the gold bars, a passing car kills four of the Spender's chickens. Dora dresses the chickens and sends them down the hole. In return, Glar's people send her several dozen gold bars, along with a note describing the chicken as "supreme food" and requesting that Dora send them turkey.

Returning the following morning, Calvin uses a winch to lower an oil drum containing one hundred flashlights into the hole. When he withdraws the drum, he finds the flashlights broken. As Calvin storms off, Dora reads a note from Glar which states "your clumsy death rays are useless to us" and "send us turkey immediately". Returning with his shotgun, Calvin demands that Dora lower him into the hole. One hour later, Dora winches the oil drum back, only to find Calvin missing and the drum filled with scores of gold bars and a final note from Glar, which states "not even the exquisite flavor of the chicken compares to the incomparable goodness of the live turkey you sent down to us" and "we beg you to send us more turkey immediately".

== Publication ==
"Hey, You Down There!" was first published in volume 35, issue 11 of Yankee in November 1971. It has since been anthologised several times, including in The Young Oxford Book of Nasty Endings in 1999.

== Adaptations ==
In 1983, a short French film based on "Hey, You Down There!" titled Ceux d'en bas was filmed. Directed by Stéphan Holmes, it starred Andrea Aronovitch and Vincent Martin.

"Hey, You Down There!" was adapted into an episode of the anthology series Amazing Stories, directed by Steven Spielberg. Titled "Thanksgiving", the episode aired on NBC on November 24, 1986, and starred David Carradine as Calvin and Kyra Sedgwick as Dora.
