= Out (1982 film) =

Deadly Drifter
- DVD cover
- Directed by: Eli Hollander
- Written by: Ronald Sukenick; Eli Hollander
- Based on: Out by Ronald Sukenick
- Produced by: Eli Hollander
- Starring: Peter Coyote; O-Lan Shepard; Jim Haynie; Danny Glover
- Cinematography: Robert Ball
- Edited by: Eli Hollander
- Music by: David Cope
- Production company: Osprey Ltd.
- Distributed by: Troma Entertainment
- Release date: 1982
- Running time: 83 minutes
- Country: United States
- Language: English

Out (also known as Deadly Drifter) is a 1982 satirical drama film directed by Eli Hollander. The film is based on Ronald Sukenick's 1973 novel Out. It stars Peter Coyote, O-Lan Jones, and Danny Glover. The movie tells the tale of Rex (Coyote) roaming the U.S. doing various assignments for a mysterious group of "urban guerrillas" they call "Our Friends". In each meeting the person or persons designated "It" carries a hidden stick of dynamite. Director Eli Hollander summarizes the film, "A subtitle of it could be 'From Yippie to Yuppie'. And the '80s are certainly the age of yuppies. The film does kind of chronicle the history of the transformation from the '60s into the '80s."

== Synopsis ==
The film is about a team, known as "Our Friends", searching for the "Old Man", who is dying. Their trip across the U.S. takes many twists and turns along the way, as is depicted through the eyes of the main character, Rex/Harrold, who ultimately questions society. Whales are part of his ultimate revelation.

== Structure ==
The film is structured in a 10 part journey/road film across America from the East to the West. The characters appear and disappear, morphing into other personalities and often using lines from previous scenes, thus the film, though linear, is a cyclic story.

== Cast ==
- Peter Coyote as Rex
- O-Lan Shepard as Nixie / Dinah
- Jim Haynie as Carl / Tommy / Optometrist
- Grandfather Semu Haute as Empty Fox
- Scott Beach as Sailor
- Danny Glover as Jojo / Roland
- Michael Grodenchik as Arnold / Boy
- Gail Dartez as Trixie / Girl
