= O-Lan Jones =

American actress (born 1950)

- Born: May 23, 1950 (age 76); Los Angeles, California, U.S.
- Education: New Dramatists
- Occupation: Actress
- Years active: 1967–present
- Spouses: Sam Shepard (m. 1969; div. 1984) Halldor Enard (m. 2003)
- Children: 1

O-Lan Jones (born May 23, 1950) is an American actress. She is best known for playing Rose on Harts of the West (1993–1994) and from her work with Tim Burton.

== Early and personal life ==
Jones was born in Los Angeles, California. Her first name comes from the Chinese heroine of the novel The Good Earth by Pearl S. Buck. Her father left the family when she was a child. Her mother Scarlett Johnson, a self-described "free spirit", moved their family for a year to a remote Mayan village in the Yucatán jungle when Jones was 15. In 1966 when Jones was 16, they moved to Greenwich Village, New York City, where Jones began her acting career. It was there that Johnson married writer and occasional actor Johnny Dark, while Jones was dating Dark's best friend, playwright Sam Shepard. Shepard wrote the role of "Oolan" for Jones in his 1967 play Forensic & The Navigators.

In 1969, Jones and Shepard were married. She went on to star in a number of his plays, including Suicide in B♭ and Angel City. Jones gave birth to their son Jesse Mojo Shepard in 1971. They divorced in 1984.

Jones is an alumna of New Dramatists. In addition to her acting, she is a writer, musician, composer and lyricist. She is the artistic director of Overtone Industries, a company she founded in 1980 dedicated to creating and developing new works for opera and musical theater. In 2003 she married her longtime boyfriend Halldor Enard.

In early 2024, filmmaker Alex Mechanik discussed that he was set to direct a feature film starring Jones for Gloria Sanchez Productions.

== Selected filmography ==
Year	Title	Role	Notes
1978	A Death in Canaan	Carla Pitts	Television film Credited as Olan Shephard
1980	Die Laughing	Judge	Credited as Olan Shephard
1982	Out	Nixie / Dinah	Credited as O-Lan Shepard
1982	Shoot the Moon	Counter Girl	Credited as O-Lan Shepard
1983	The Right Stuff	Pretty Girl	Credited as O-Lan Shepard
1988	Married to the Mob	Phyllis	
1988	Miracle Mile	Waitress	
1988	Wildfire	Mrs. Johnson	
1989	Lonesome Dove	Sally Skull	Credited as Olan Jones
1989	How I Got into College	Sally O'Connor	
1990	Edward Scissorhands	Esmeralda	
1990	Pacific Heights	Maid	
1992	Seinfeld	Waitress	Episode: "The Bubble Boy"
1992	Beethoven	Biker Woman	
1993	Shelf Life	Tina	
1993–1994	Harts of the West	Rose McLaughlin	
1994	Natural Born Killers	Mabel	
1996	The X-Files	Rebecca Waite	Episode: "Sanguinarium"
1996	Mars Attacks!	Sue-Ann Norris	
1998	The Truman Show	Bar Waitress	
2000	American Virgin	Kim	
2000	Attention Shoppers	Meg	
2001	Diagnosis: Murder	Chantelle Boudreau	Episode: "Bachelor Fathers"
2002	American Girl	Hildegarde	
2013	Syrup	Clinic Receptionist	
2015	Community	Mrs. Lambert	Episode: "Wedding Videography"
2016	Miss Peregrine's Home for Peculiar Children	Shelly	
