= Shelby Lindley =

American actress

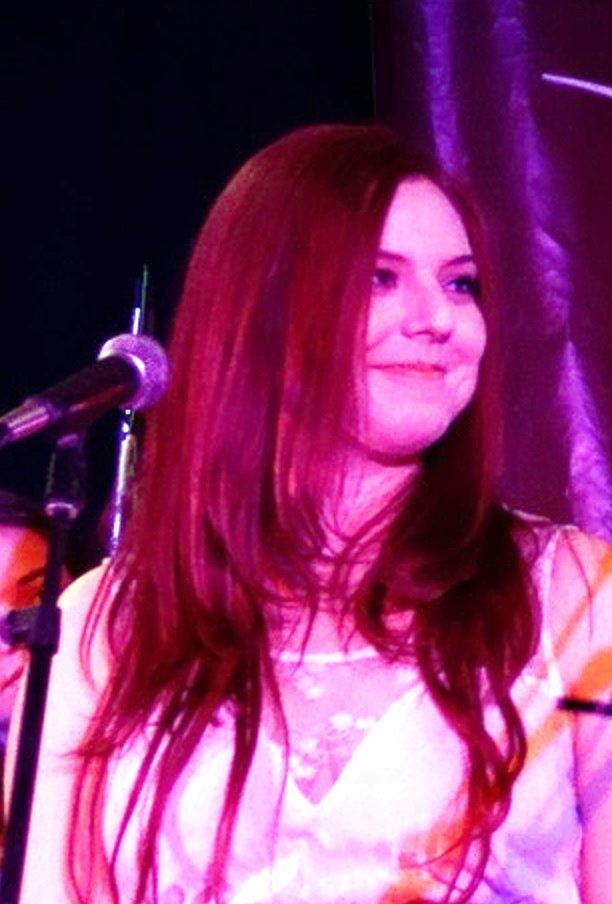
- Lindley in 2014
- Born: September 12, 1986 (age 39); Los Angeles, California, U.S.
- Occupation: Actress
- Years active: 1993–2017
- Children: 2
- Website: shelbylindleyvo.com

Shelby Lindley (born September 12, 1986) is an American retired voice actress, who has provided voices for the English dubs of Japanese anime and video games. Her major voice roles include Tsumugi Kotobuki in K-On!, Chizuru Aizawa in Squid Girl and Hitomi Shizuki in Puella Magi Madoka Magica.

== Filmography ==
- **BOLD** indicates a lead role

=== Anime ===
List of performances in anime
Year	Title	Role	Notes	Ref.
2008–2009	Tweeny Witches	Miletis	Also OVA	Resume
2009	Magical Girl Lyrical Nanoha A's	**Hayate Yagami**, **Shamal**		Resume
2011	Squid Girl	**Chizuru Aizawa**		Resume
2011–2013	K-On!	**Tsumugi Kotobuki**	2 TV series and movie	
2012–2015	Puella Magi Madoka Magica	**Hitomi Shizuki**	Also Movie	Resume
2014	Gargantia on the Verdurous Planet	Matsumoto's Daughter	Also OVA	Resume
2014	Coppelion	**Taeko Nomura**		
2015	Hyperdimension Neptunia: The Animation	**Ram**	Also OVA	
2015	Noragami	Aimi "Ami" Tabata		
2015–2016	Noragami Aragoto	Aimi "Ami" Tabata	2017: Home Video Only	

=== Animation ===
List of performances in animation
Year	Title	Role	Notes	Ref.
2014	Lalaloopsy Girls: Welcome to L.A.L.A. Prep School	Tippy Tumbleina		

=== Film ===
List of performances in film
Year	Title	Role	Notes	Ref.
1993	Shelf Life	Young Pam		
1998	Magic Power Scouts	Cathy		
2009	Tokyo Zombie	**Fumiyo**	Live-action dub	
2012	Little Sister	Young Mei Mei	Live-action dub	
2012	Climbing Mt. Evelyn	Gloria		

=== Video games ===
List of performances in video games
Year	Title	Role	Notes	Ref.
2003	Cardinal Arc	Suika		Resume
2008	Away: Shuffle Dungeon	Anella		Resume
2009	Rune Factory Frontier	Annette		Resume
2011	Hyperdimension Neptunia	**Ram**	Re;Birth 1 only	Resume
2012	Hyperdimension Neptunia Mk2	**Ram**	Also Re;Birth 2	Resume
2013	Hyperdimension Neptunia Victory	**Ram**	Also Re;Birth 3	Resume
2014	Hyperdimension Neptunia: Producing Perfection	**Ram**		Resume
2015	Atelier Shallie: Alchemists of the Dusk Sea	**Shallistera**	Also Dusk Trilogy	
2015	Hyperdimension Neptunia U: Action Unleashed	**Ram**		Resume
2015	Onechanbara Z2: Chaos	Saaya		Resume
2016	Megadimension Neptunia VII	**Ram**		Resume
2016	MegaTagmension Blanc + Neptune VS Zombies	**Ram**		Resume
2017	Cyberdimension Neptunia: 4 Goddesses Online	**Ram**		Resume
2023	Neptunia: Sisters vs Sisters	**Ram**		archived
2024	Neptunia Game Maker R:Evolution	**Ram**		archived
