= Driven (1996 film) =

- Directed by: Michael Paradies Shoob
- Written by: Michael Paradies Shoob
- Produced by: Daniel Linck
- Starring: Tony Todd; Daniel Roebuck; Whip Hubley; Chad Lowe
- Cinematography: Joseph Mealey
- Edited by: Fabienne Rawley
- Music by: Jay Ferguson
- Release date: May 8, 1996
- Running time: 103 minutes
- Country: United States
- Language: English

Driven is a 1996 American drama film written and directed by Michael Paradies Shoob and starring Tony Todd, Daniel Roebuck, Whip Hubley and Chad Lowe.

== Cast ==
- Tony Todd as Darius Pelton
- Whip Hubley as Jason Schuyler
- Daniel Roebuck as Dale Schneider
- Chad Lowe as LeGrand
- Diane Dilascio as Rachel
- Xander Berkeley as J.D. Johnson
- Lou Rawls as Charlie
- Eric Pierpoint as Hal
- Lee Garlington as Marian
- Rawle D. Lewis as Soup
- Richard Riehle as Leo
- Lesley Woods as Iron Gray
- Susan Parker as Desiree, the Blind Woman
- Spencer Garrett as Business Man #1
- Anthony Palermo as Businessman #2
- Joseph Culp as Chiropractic Assistant

== Release ==
The film premiered at the Floating Film Festival in May 1996, and was screened in the Discovery program at the 1996 Toronto International Film Festival.

It aired on KCET on April 22, 1998.

== Reception ==
Todd McCarthy of Variety gave the film a mixed review, calling it "Dramatic but not entirely credible."

David Kronke of the Los Angeles Times gave the film a positive review and wrote that it "possesses a verve and brooding atmosphere all its own."
