= Paul Bartel =

American actor and director (1938–2000)

- Undated photo of Bartel
- Born: August 6, 1938; Brooklyn, New York, U.S.
- Died: May 13, 2000 (aged 61); New York City, New York, U.S.
- Occupations: Actor, director, writer
- Years active: 1968–2000

Paul Bartel (August 6, 1938 – May 13, 2000) was an American actor, writer and director. He was perhaps most known for his 1982 hit black comedy Eating Raoul, which he co-wrote, starred in and directed.

Bartel appeared in over 90 movies and TV episodes, including such titles as Eat My Dust! (1976), Hollywood Boulevard (1976), Rock 'n' Roll High School (1979), Get Crazy (1983), Chopping Mall (1986), and Amazon Women on the Moon (1987). He frequently co-starred with friend and former Warhol girl Mary Woronov; the pair appeared in 17 films together, often as husband and wife.

Bartel also directed 11 low-budget films, many of which he also acted in or wrote. He started in 1968 with the short The Secret Cinema, a paranoid delusional fantasy of self-referential cinema. He graduated to features in 1972 with the horror-comedy Private Parts. He would go on to direct such cult films as Death Race 2000 (1975), Eating Raoul (1982), Lust in the Dust (1985) and Scenes from the Class Struggle in Beverly Hills (1989).

== Biography ==
Bartel was born to William and Jesse Bartel in Brooklyn, New York. He was raised in Manhattan, and Montclair, New Jersey in his childhood. He had an interest from a young age with marionettes before eventually persuading his father to buy him a 16mm camera around the time he was attending Monclair High School. He soon did a "con" on his teacher to spend a semester making an animated cartoon, complete with using the class to do "in-betweens".

Bartel studied film and theatre at UCLA, and spent a year on a Fulbright scholarship at the Centro Sperimentale film school in Rome, before returning to the United States. He fulfilled his military service by talking his way into the U.S. Army Signal Corps Pictorial Center in Long Island City and later made films for the United States Information Agency.

=== Early films ===
Bartel's first films were made in high school, primarily abstract and animated 16mm shorts, including titles such as Cinema Experimental (1954), Non Objective Film (1956), Margaret Whiting Sings "The Money Tree" (1956), and Camel Rock (1957). After making the 35mm short Italian-language film Progetti (1962) while attending the Centro Sperimentale di Cinematografia in Rome, Bartel produced The Secret Cinema (1966). Shot on an extremely low budget in 35mm and with his own money, The Secret Cinema was the film that began his reputation as a new and unusual independent voice in narrative cinema.

He followed it with another short he wrote and directed, Naughty Nurse (1969). He co-wrote the feature Utterly Without Redeeming Social Value (1969), also starring in the lead. He worked as an actor only in Hi, Mom! (1970) directed by Brian De Palma.

Bartel's first feature as director was Private Parts (1972), a comedy horror film for MGM. It was produced by Gene Corman and Bartel was in the cast.

=== New World Pictures ===
Gene Corman's brother, Roger, ran a production company, New World Pictures, and hired Bartel to be second unit director on Big Bad Mama (1974), an action film. Bartel also played a small role.

Roger Corman gave Bartel the opportunity to direct Death Race 2000 (1975) after Bartel had worked as second-unit director on Big Bad Mama. The satirical science-fiction action film starred David Carradine, Sylvester Stallone and Mary Woronov, with Bartel also appearing in a small role. Made on a low budget, the film was a significant commercial success, earning more than $5 million in theatrical receipts, and subsequently became a cult classic.

Corman promptly offered Bartel the chance to direct a similar action film with Carradine for New World, Cannonball (1976). Bartel also worked on the script. The film is littered with cameos from people such as Joe Dante and Martin Scorsese. Bartel later said he worked for a year on Death Race 2000 for $5,000 "so when it was finished I desperately needed money. The only thing anybody wanted from me was another car picture, hence Cannonball. Corman had drummed into me the idea that if Death Race had been "harder" and "more real" it would have been more popular. Like a fool, I believed him. I am not, and never have been, very much interested in cars and racing" so he decided to load up the film with "cameos and character gimmicks that did interest me."

Bartel was in much demand from other directors at New World to play small parts in their pictures: he appeared in Eat My Dust! (1976) for Charles B. Griffith, Hollywood Boulevard (1976) for Joe Dante and Allan Arkush (quite a large role, as a director, which Bartel credited for really kicking off his acting career), Mr Billions (1977) for Jonathan Kaplan (not a New World film but Bartel met Kaplan at the company), Grand Theft Auto (1977) for Ron Howard, Piranha (1978) for Dante, and Rock 'n' Roll High School (1979) for Arkush. Outside New World he appeared in The Hustler of Muscle Beach (1980) for Jonathan Kaplan, and Heartbeeps (1981) for Allan Arkush.

=== Eating Raoul and after ===
Bartel wrote a script with Richard Blackburn, Eating Raoul (1982). Bartel managed to raise the finance and starred in the film along with Woronov. Made for $230,000 (raised by himself and his parents) it was a hit on the art house circuit, grossing $10 million, and became a cult movie.

Bartel had small roles in White Dog (1982), directed by Sam Fuller and produced by New World alumni Jon Davison, Trick or Treats (1982), Heart Like a Wheel (1983) for Kaplan, and Get Crazy (1983) for Arkush.

The success of Eating Raoul enabled Bartel to raise $3 million in finance (ten times the budget of Raoul) for a screwball comedy he had co written and wanted to direct, Not for Publication (1984). It was a box-office disaster. More successful was Lust in the Dust (1985) starring Tab Hunter and Divine.

Bartel continued to be in demand as an actor, appearing in Frankenweenie (1984), a short for Tim Burton, Into the Night (1985) for John Landis, European Vacation (1985) for Amy Heckerling, and Sesame Street Presents: Follow That Bird (1985).

Bartel directed The Longshot (1986) based on a script by Tim Conway who starred. Bartel said he was a "director for hire" on the project. "My sensibility was on some level antipathetic to what Tim Conway wanted. I was trying to find interesting things under the surface, and he just wanted more surface."

He appeared in an episode of Fame directed by Arkush, and reprised his Raoul character in Chopping Mall (1986) for Jim Wynorski produced by Julie Corman (Wynorski says Bartel and Woronov adlibbed their roles). He appeared in "The Jar", an episode of Alfred Hitchcock Presents directed by Burton, as well as the film Killer Party (1986).

He directed two episodes of Amazing Stories, both from his own scripts, both featuring him as an actor: "Secret Cinema" (a remake of his short film of the same name) and "Gershwin's Trunk".

He had roles in Munchies (1987) (produced by Roger Corman), Amazon Women on the Moon (1987) (in a segment directed by Dante), an episode of Crime Story, Baja Oklahoma (1988), and Shakedown (1988).

Bartel co wrote but did not direct Mortuary Academy (1988); he and Woronov also played small roles. He was an executive producer on Out of the Dark (1988), in which he had a small role. He had a role in Caddyshack II (1988) directed by Arkush.

Bartel directed Scenes from the Class Struggle in Beverly Hills (1989), based on a story of his.

He wrote a sequel to Eating Raoul called Bland Ambition, where Paul and Mary wind up running for Governor of California. It was about 10 days from the start of filming when Vestron withdrew its financial backing.

Bartel appeared in Pucker Up and Bark Like a Dog (1989), Far Out Man (1990), Gremlins 2: The New Batch (1990) (for Dante), Dan Turner, Hollywood Detective (1990), an episode L.A. Law directed by Arkush, Liquid Dreams (1991), and Desire and Hell at Sunset Motel (1991).

Bartel had a large supporting role in The Pope Must Diet (1991), directed by Peter Richardson of The Comic Strip, and was in The Living End (1992) from Gregg Araki, Soulmates (1992), and Posse (1993).

A musical adaptation of Eating Raoul premiered off Broadway in 1992.

Bartel appeared in some episodes of The Comic Strip Presents..., even directing one ("Demonella"). He was in Acting on Impulse, Tales of the City and Grief (1993).

Bartel's last feature as director was Shelf Life (1993). Based on a play and done for a low budget, it struggled to find distribution.

=== Final years ===
Bartel appeared in Twin Sitters (1993), The Usual Suspects (1995), and The Jerky Boys (1995). He had a rare star role in The Wacky Adventures of Dr. Boris and Nurse Shirley (1995) but was normally seen in minor parts: Naomi & Wynonna: Love Can Build a Bridge (1995), Not Like Us (1995) for Corman's new company Concorde Pictures, A Bucket of Blood (1995) also for Concorde, Number One Fan (1995), Red Ribbon Blues (1996), Joe's Apartment (1996), Escape from L.A. (1996), and Basquiat (1996).

He directed 2 episodes of Clueless, "We Shall Overpack" and "Cher Inc". He also appeared in both.

He was in Prey of the Jaguar (1996), The Elevator (1996), Lewis & Clark & George (1997), Boston Common, Skeletons (1997), The Inheritance (1997), Chicago Hope, The Devil's Child (1997), Billy's Hollywood Screen Kiss (1998), More Tales of the City, Race, Vengeance Unlimited, Dreamers, Hard Time: The Premonition, episodes of Ally McBeal and Snoops directed by Arkush, Good vs Evil, Zoo (1999), Hamlet (2000), Dinner and a Movie (2001) and Perfect Fit (2001).

== Personal life ==
Bartel was openly gay; this influenced his career choice, as he found himself more accepted and afforded more opportunities within the independent film industry than he would have in Hollywood.

In 1979, he was a member of the jury at the 29th Berlin International Film Festival.

== Death and legacy ==
Bartel died May 13, 2000, of a heart attack at his home in Manhattan, two weeks after liver cancer surgery; he was 61 years old. His final screen appearance was a posthumous role as "Dad" alongside Mary Woronov ("Mom") in the 2001 independent film Perfect Fit.

Two of Bartel's early directorial efforts, Progetti and The Secret Cinema, were restored by the Academy Film Archive.

== Filmography ==
- Progetti (1962, director)
- The Secret Cinema (1966, director)
- Private Parts (1972) as Man in Park (uncredited); also: director
- Big Bad Mama (1974) as Guest at Fancy Party (uncredited)
- Death Race 2000 (1975) as Frankenstein's Doctor (uncredited); also: director
- Hollywood Boulevard (1976) as Eric von Leppe
- Cannonball! (1976) as Lester Marks; also: writer, director
- Grand Theft Auto (1977) as Groom
- Piranha (1978) as Mr. Dumont
- Rock 'n' Roll High School (1979) as Mr. McGree
- Heartbeeps (1981) as Party Guest
- Eating Raoul (1982) as Paul Bland; also: writer, director
- White Dog (1982) as Cameraman
- Heart Like a Wheel (1983) as Chef Paul
- Get Crazy (1983) as Dr. Carver
- Frankenweenie (1984) as Mr. Walsh
- Not for Publication (1984) writer, director
- Sesame Street Presents: Follow That Bird (1985) as a cook in the Grouch diner
- Into the Night (1985) as Beverly Wilshire Hotel Doorman
- Lust in the Dust (1985) director
- European Vacation (1985) as Mr. Froeger
- Killer Party (1986) as Professor Zito
- Chopping Mall (1986) as Paul Bland
- The Longshot (1986) director
- Munchies (1987) as Dr. Crowder
- Amazon Women on the Moon (1987) as Doctor, in "Reckless Youth" segment
- Baja Oklahoma (1987)
- Shakedown (1988) as Night Court Judge
- Caddyshack II (1988) as Mr. Jamison
- Out of the Dark (1989) as Hotel Clerk; also: executive producer
- Scenes from the Class Struggle in Beverly Hills (1989) as Dr. Mo Van De Kamp; also: writer, director
- Far Out Man (1990) as Weebee Cool
- Gremlins 2: The New Batch (1990) as Theatre Manager
- The Pope Must Die (1991) as Monsignor Fitchie
- The Living End (1992) as Twister Master
- Desire and Hell at Sunset Motel (1992) as The Manager
- Posse (1993) as Mayor Bigwood
- Shelf Life (1993) director
- Tales of the City (1993) as Charles Hillary Lord
- The Jerky Boys (1995) as Host at Tut's
- The Usual Suspects (1995) .... as Smuggler
- Love Can Build a Bridge (1995)
- Red Ribbon Blues (1996) as Fred the Pharmacist
- Joe's Apartment (1996) as NEA Scout
- Escape from L.A. (1996) as Congressman
- Basquiat (1996) as Henry Geldzahler
- The Elevator (1996) as Acting Coach
- Lewis and Clark and George (1997) as Cop
- The Inheritance (1997)
- The Devil's Child (1997)
- Billy's Hollywood Screen Kiss (1998) as Rex Webster
- More Tales of the City (1998) as Charles Hillary Lord
- Hamlet (2000) as Osric
- Perfect Fit (2001) as Dad
