= List of Puella Magi Madoka Magica characters =

From left to right: Kyoko Sakura, Sayaka Miki, Madoka Kaname, Kyubey (in lap), Homura Akemi (standing), and Mami Tomoe

This is a list of characters for the anime television series Puella Magi Madoka Magica and its various spin-offs. The series revolves around magical girls who are granted any single wish in exchange for fighting against evil beings known as witches.

== Puella Magi Madoka Magica characters ==
=== Main characters ===
Madoka Kaname (鹿目 まどか, Kaname Madoka)
Voiced by: Aoi Yūki (Japanese); Christine Marie Cabanos (English)
Portrayed by Akari Nibu (Magia Record stage play)
Madoka is the primary protagonist of the Madoka Magica series. She first appears as a selflessly kind and shy girl who comes from a wealthy and loving family, until when she meets Homura Akemi in her dream fighting the witch Walpurgisnacht in a post-apocalyptic city before getting defeated and begs Madoka not to become a magical girl at the near of her death. A transfer student that exactly looks like Homura and has the same name tells her that if she values her family and friends she should never try to do anything that changes her whole life to the worst. She and Sayaka Miki were at a music shop as she puts on headphones to listen to a song but she began to hear someone's cry of help from far away, she immediately ran to the source of the sound only to find Homura in her magical girl form tormenting Kyubey. she rescues him with Sayaka as the two try to escape but they were eventually dragged in a witch's labyrinth before Mami Tomoe's intervention, a skilled magical girl who kills the witch to save them. She thanked Madoka and Sayaka for saving Kyubey meanwhile Kyubey offered the two for a contract to become magical girls like Mami, while starts Mami acting as their mentor to show them what is it like to be a magical girl so they can decide whether they want to be or not, before she was brutally beheaded while fighting the Dessert Witch Charlotte (シャルロッテ, Sharurotte). Leading Madoka to feel traumatized and depressed, while she was on her way home she finds her friend Hitomi Shizuki who was affected with a witch's kiss alongside other people while preparing a mass suicide ordered by the witch H.N. Elly/Kristen, Madoka steps in to stop the attempts but only to almost attacked by them and get fell into a witch's labyrinth. Madoka begins questioning if she was a burden to everyone and Mami because she couldn't do anything to help and she deserves to die, before she was saved by Sayaka and finds out she became a magical girl to heal Kyōsuke's arm. Madoka was worried about Sayaka's choice but she was told by her not to worry. But then Sayaka got in a fight with Kyōko Sakura, a fiery magical girl who challenged Sayaka on who gets to have control of Mitakihara before getting forced to stop by Homura, Madoka tells her to forget about her but Sayaka was persistent on fighting Kyōko because she opposes her views, Madoka talks to her mother Junko about everything and if she did something wrong as she reassured her saying that it's fine to make mistakes at a young age and says that doing something wrong for someone is sometimes the right thing to do. And Sayaka prepares for a violent fight with Kyōko again and a panic-stricken Madoka tried to prevent them from fighting by taking away Sayaka's soul gem and throwing it on the road, only for Sayaka to go into a dead-like status while Homura rushes to get it back. Because when a body contains no soul near it, the magical girl's body start decomposing and get "zombified", Kyōko lashes out at Kyubey for not telling them any of that while Sayaka gets back her soul gem and awakens. Then Sayaka fell into despair after finding out that Kyōsuke and Hitomi are now meaning she just risked her life for the boy she likes only for him to like someone else, her soul gem darkened and she turns into the witch Oktavia von Seckendorff. Madoka decided to skip school when Kyōko wanted to have a talk with her about that there's a way to save Sayaka as they both reached out to defeat Oktavia while Madoka tries to talk to the Sayaka inside to get back her memories but gets knocked out unconscious while Kyōko had no choice but to sacrifice herself to save Sayaka. While Madoka was rescued by Homura and Sayaka goes back to her human form only for her to die a few days later. Leaving Madoka in hopeless despair while Kyubey tells her that this is the reality of all magical girls learning that he had deceived multiple magical girls over centuries. While Walpurgisnacht terrorizes Mitakihara, Homura shows up to finish it off but fails and when she tries to kill it again she gets hit by a large building and left injured and weak. Until Madoka arrives and sees Homura's status, learning that Homura has spent years resetting time to save her from becoming a magical girl and falling into despair and only kept failing as Madoka dies in more horrendous ways every timeline, extending her karmic destiny. This made Madoka make a wish to erase all witches before they were born and save all magical girls from despair, permanently becoming the Law of Cycles.
Homura Akemi (暁美 ほむら, Akemi Homura)
Voiced by: Chiwa Saitō (Japanese); Cristina Vee (English)
Portrayed by Hina Kawata (Magia Record stage play)
An enigmatic girl who is intensely fixated on Madoka Kaname, she appears as a detached transfer student that is admired along the students. She asks for someone to take her to the nurse and Madoka volunteers since she works with the nurse, as Madoka tries to befriend Homura and get her to socialize more but Homura started ominously warning her if she loves her friends and family she shall not do anything that would change her life. Homura, in her magical girl from she was trying to finish off Kyubey before he reaches out to Madoka to offer her a contract to become a magical girl but then gets stopped by Madoka. She tried to prevent Mami from putting Sayaka and Madoka in danger, but ends up getting restrained by Mami's ribbons. When Mami dies, she breaks free and defeats Charlotte and takes the grief seed. In the end Madoka asks Homura on why is she doing all of this and Homura bitterly confesses that has been time traveling to save her from becoming a magical girl and suffering from despair, dating back to the first timeline when she was a timid, and ill girl with very low self-esteem. Madoka was the only one who was nice to her and saved her from a witch attack. When Madoka dies after fighting Walpurgisnacht, she wished to become the one who protects Madoka instead of Madoka protecting her, gaining the power to time travel. She goes on the dark web to learn how to build a bomb and becomes more confident than she used to be, but everytime she tries to save Madoka, her fate worsens and continues to die. When Walpurgisnacht arrives Homura decides to defeat it by herself, only to fail and get her leg severely injured. When she tried to reset time Madoka rushes to her in concern, and to repay her for trying to save her multiple times she makes a universally changing wish to erase all witches and save magical girls, leaving Homura as the only magical girl in the whole world. Afterwards, she's the only one who remembers Madoka alongside Madoka's little brother, Tatsuya.
Mami Tomoe (巴 マミ, Tomoe Mami)
Voiced by: Kaori Mizuhashi (Japanese); Carrie Keranen (English)
Portrayed by Shiho Katō (Magia Record stage play)
A elegant and cheerful magical girl who encountered Madoka and Sayaka, befriending them. She acts as their mentor since she's a more experienced magical girl, she takes pride in her actions and has a strong sense of justice. It reveals that she made a wish for Kyubey to save her from a fatal car accident that led her parents to die. While fighting Charlotte, she gets dies by getting her head bitten off. In the third timeline, Mami was overwhelmed by horror and grief over the fact that magical girls turn into witches. She kills Kyōko and attempted to kill Homura as a act of mercy, before getting killed by Madoka.
Sayaka Miki (美樹 さやか, Miki Sayaka)
Voiced by: Eri Kitamura (Japanese); Sarah Anne Williams (English)
Portrayed by Miku Kanemura (Magia Record stage play)
A energetic and tomboyish girl, she is Madoka Kaname's childhood friend who saved her from getting bullied. She becomes suspicious of Homura Akemi and begin disliking her after she saw her harassing Kyubey. Like Mami, she has a great sense of justice and acts very heroic. She makes a wish to heal her violin prodigy crush's arm, Kyōsuke Kamijō. She saves Madoka from a witch and begin adapting to her new life as a magical girl, until she meets Kyōko Sakura, a territorial magical girl who mocks her heroic ideology and challenges her for a fight that was stopped by Homura. While Sayaka was frustrated and disgusted at Kyōko's ideologies, she decides to face her again. Just as about they begin a brutal fight, Madoka steps in and throws away Sayaka's soul gem, making her fall in a dead status before Homura rushes to get back her soul gem. Hitomi had a discussion with Sayaka about that she's in love with Kyōsuke and she wants to confess to him. After she confessed and they got together, Sayaka falls into despair and calls herself a fool. Before becoming a witch and getting saved by Kyōko's sacrifice. She was in a coma before she dies tragically.
Kyubey (キュゥべえ, Kyūbē)
Voiced by: Emiri Katō (Japanese); Cassandra Lee Morris (English)
Kyubey is the messenger of magic. he represents the Incubator race, extraterrestrial beings that are incapable of feeling emotions. They discovered that magic is the only solution for the heat death, is when the world runs out of energies because of increased entropy. Thus creating the Magical Girl System. In which they manipulate adolescent girls to become magical girls so they fall in despair and become witches, which results into a burst of emotions that the Incubators use to harvest human emotions to gain energy from it to prevent entropy from pushing back. This system was destroyed after Madoka sacrifices herself to become the Law of Cycles.
Kyoko Sakura (佐倉 杏子, Sakura Kyōko)
Voiced by: Ai Nonaka (Japanese); Lauren Landa (English)
Portrayed by Kyōko Saitō (Magia Record stage play)
A fierce and stubborn girl who appears as a self-centred magical girl who attacks Sayaka. In reality, she's quite sympathetic towards who has the same struggles as her like Sayaka. Kyōko's father was a unorthodox priest of a church who was losing followers because of the abnormal practices, and Kyōko wished that everyone could listen to her father. when he found out that his daughter made the people who followed him were hypnotized to do so instead of genuine faith, he began alchol abuse before he suddenly snapped, murdering Kyōko's mother and her little sister Momo. Leaving her the only survivor and that event completely reshaped her to what she is now.

=== Supporting characters ===
Junko Kaname (鹿目 詢子, Kaname Junko)
Voiced by: Yūko Gotō (Japanese); Carrie Savage (TV, Movies 1-2), Julie Ann Taylor (Movie 3) (English)
Madoka's mother, an executive who wears expertly applied makeup and sometimes comes home intoxicated, making it hard to wake her up in the morning. Aside from this, she is a caring and gentle person and often gives Madoka advice whenever she is troubled.
Tomohisa Kaname (鹿目 知久, Kaname Tomohisa)
Voiced by: Tetsuya Iwanaga (Japanese); Kyle Hebert (English)
Madoka's father, who takes care of the housework, cooking, and cleaning. He is a kind person, and makes hot chocolate for Madoka after she is kept up late as a result of Junko coming home drunk.
Tatsuya Kaname (鹿目 タツヤ, Kaname Tatsuya)
Voiced by: Kaori Mizuhashi (Japanese); Stephanie Sheh (English)
Madoka's younger brother. He is the only other person that remembers Madoka, besides Homura, after she becomes Ultimate Madoka.
Hitomi Shizuki (志筑 仁美, Shizuki Hitomi)
Voiced by: Ryōko Shintani (Japanese); Shelby Lindley (English)
Madoka and Sayaka's classmate and friend, although she sometimes feels left out of Madoka and Sayaka's friendship. Hitomi is quite popular amongst boys. At one point in the plot, she and numerous other people are possessed by a witch named H.N. Elly/Kristen, and attempt suicide by entering a mostly sealed warehouse and starting a reaction of bleach and ammonia, producing chloramines. Madoka, who throws the reaction container out a window before anyone is killed, saves her life just before getting caught in the witch's labyrinth, where she is further rescued by Sayaka when she arrives to kill the witch and save Madoka.
It is later revealed that she is also in love with Kyosuke, and her confidence in being able to confess her feelings only contributes to Sayaka's despair. She is later seen at Sayaka's funeral, clutching Kyosuke's shoulder and crying, and is said to have blamed herself for Sayaka's death.
In Rebellion, she suffers from sadness and anger because hers and Kyōsuke's schedules were different, thus creating a Nightmare from her emotions.
Kyosuke Kamijo (上条 恭介, Kamijō Kyōsuke)
Voiced by: Seiko Yoshida (Japanese); Marin Miller (English)
A boy whom Sayaka constantly visits in hospital. He used to be a violin player, but an accident crippled him and destroyed the feeling in his fingers, making him unable to play an instrument again. Sayaka uses her wish to cure his hand, allowing him to play the violin once more. Despite this, he inevitably ends up dating Hitomi instead of Sayaka, which causes her to fall into despair and turn into a witch.
In the alternate timeline depicted in The Different Story, Kyosuke is told by Madoka about how Sayaka healed his hand with magic, though Sayaka ends up transforming into a witch before he can learn the whole story.
Kazuko Saotome (早乙女 和子, Saotome Kazuko)
Voiced by: Junko Iwao (Japanese); Karen Strassman (English)
Madoka's teacher, who constantly has trouble keeping a boyfriend. She is good friends with Junko.
Nakazawa (中沢, Nakazawa)
Voiced by: Yoshitsugu Matsuoka (Japanese); Jason C. Miller (English)
A student in Madoka's class, who is constantly picked on by Kazuko to answer her questions about dating. He is one of Kyosuke's friends.
Nagisa Momoe (百江 なぎさ, Momoe Nagisa)
Voiced by: Kana Asumi (Japanese); Xanthe Huynh (English)
An eight-year-old magical girl who first appears in Rebellion, technically appearing in the series as the Dessert Witch Charlotte (シャルロッテ, Sharurotte) who violently killed Mami before being destroyed. Nagisa has a childish personality, but is shown to be more perceptive than the other magical girls. According to Charlotte's production notes from the anime, Nagisa became a magical girl after wishing to eat cheesecake with her terminally ill mother one last time, only to discover that she could have wished for her mother to be cured and immediately fall into despair, becoming a Witch.
In the ending of Rebellion, Nagisa is brought back to her original form as an agent of the Law of Cycles. She initially acts as the group's friendly mascot creature Bebe, living with Mami as she aids the group in defeating Nightmares by trapping them in a small cafe-esque Witch Barrier. She eventually reveals her true form and helps the girls fight Homullily's familiars and demonstrates her ability to access her old Witch powers even as a Magical Girl. She is last seen in Homura's new world with Mami, who saved her from a falling stack of cheese.
Zi Ding Xiang (紫丁香, Shi Chō-ka)
Voiced by: Shion Wakayama
Selema Terez (セルマ・テレーゼ, Serema Terēze)
Voiced by: Tomoyo Kurosawa
Wasu (ワス, Wasu)
Voiced by: Maaya Sakamoto

== Puella Magi Kazumi Magica: The Innocent Malice characters ==
=== Pleiades Saints ===
Kazumi (かずみ) / Kazumi Subaru (昴 かずみ, Subaru Kazumi)
Voiced by: Sakura Tange (Magia Record)
The main protagonist of Puella Magi Kazumi Magica is a magical girl with no memories besides her name, though she slowly starts to regain her memories as she fights alongside her friends, Umika and Kaoru. She wears bells on her ears that can sometimes change things according to her wishes, and an ahoge that allegedly can detect witches. She often judges people to be bad or good depending on whether they waste food. When transformed, she dons a black outfit with a witch's hat and fights using a large cross. As a result of her memory loss, she does not remember the wish she made as she never told Umika or Kaoru what it was. As a result of absorbing evil nuts from Airi, she occasionally enters a rabid state.
It is soon revealed by Satomi that Kazumi was originally a magical girl named Michiru Kazusa, who had died when she turned into a witch. The Pleiades decided to make clones of her, filling her corpse with the flesh of witches and having memories implanted by Umika, the current Kazumi being the thirteenth clone made. (Kazumi can be written in kanji as "一三", meaning "thirteen".)
During the climax, as Kazumi was technically a man-made magical girl who hadn't made a contract, she becomes a true magical girl with the simple wish to become human, taking on the last name Subaru (昴) (meaning "Pleiades") as she does so and gaining a new appearance.
Umika Misaki (御崎 海香, Misaki Umika)
Voiced by: Aya Uchida (Magia Record)
Kazumi's friend and a middle school student who lives in her home with Kazumi and Kaoru and is also a magical who is part of a seven girl group known as the Pleiades Saints. She is a best-selling novelist as a result of using her wish to meet with an editor who would recognize her talent. She uses a magical book which allows her to read a witch's mind, allowing her to determine its weakness. Whenever she has writer's block, she enters a fierce cooking phase before going on a shopping spree. She gained the ability to rewrite memories, using it on Kyubey to prevent him from making further contracts. She survives the events of the series and decides to write a new book called Innocent Malice.
Kaoru Maki (牧 カオル, Maki Kaoru)
Voiced by: Azusa Tadokoro (Magia Record)
Umika and Kazumi's friend, a magical girl who lives with them. She enjoys playing soccer, but got injured in a match, which placed a heavy burden on the person who tackled her that she felt guilty about. She wished to help those that were hurt that day, which resulted in her possessing great leg strength. In battle, she is able to form powerful armor around her limbs. She survives the final fight and, together with Umika, promise to protect Kazumi and find a way to reverse the Witch creation process.
Saki Asami (浅海 サキ, Asami Saki)
An intelligent magical girl who is the leader of the Pleiades Saints and has a strong desire to protect Kazumi. After the death of her sister, Miyuki, she became a magical girl after being saved by Kazumi, wishing for the flower Miyuki left behind to bloom forever. When she learned of the nature of magical girls' transformations into witches, she and the other Pleiades Saints began removing soul gems from other magical girls and preserving their bodies so that they would not become witches, hoping for a way to make them human again. It's stated that Saki was in love with Michiru, the original Kazumi, which makes her unable to kill the failed clones. Inevitably, she is turned into a witch when Kanna forces an evil nut into her.
Mirai Wakaba (若葉 みらい, Wakaba Mirai)
One of the Pleiades Saints, who often acts like a rich kid and tends to whack Kazumi on the head whenever she doubts herself. She has the ability to summon large amounts of teddy bears to overwhelm the enemy. She used her wish to have a museum for all her teddy bears. In the past, she was a shy girl who didn't have any friends. She was in love with Saki, but was ultimately killed by her when she turned into a witch.
Satomi Usagi (宇佐木 里美, Usagi Satomi)
A polite magical girl. When she was unable to help a pet cat, she used her wish to gain the ability to talk to animals as she wants to become a vet when she grows up. Her magic allows her to control other people. Similar to Mami in the original series, she is shown to become mentally unstable when she learns the truth about witches and sees Kazumi as a witch who only looks like a human. Revealing the truth to Kazumi about her true nature, Satomi attempts to kill Kazumi using other failed clones; however, during the battle, her soul gem begins to crack despite not having any visible corruption, and she transforms into a witch who is soon killed by Kazumi.
Niko Kanna (神那 ニコ, Kanna Niko)
A dry-witted magical girl who often speaks in blunt statements, real name Kanna Hijiri (聖 カンナ, Hijiri Kanna). Having falling into depression after accidentally killing two other girls in a gun tragedy when she was young, she became a magical girl to escape from reality, creating a clone of herself to take her place in her family to experience the happiness she couldn't, whilst she took on the name of "Niko Kanna", showing she viewed herself as the "fake" of the two. (Niko can be written in kanji as "二子", meaning "twin" or "second child".) Her magic involves reconstructing materials into other objects such as missiles or clones. She ended up transforming into a witch following a battle against the Souju sisters, during which her clone, Kanna, replaced her in the group.
Michiru Kazusa (和紗 ミチル, Kazusa Michiru)
Michiru was the magical girl who Kazumi was based on. She had become a magical girl after making a contract with Kyubey to allow her grandmother to live her final day in peace. Having previously been rescued by Mami beforehand, Michiru had taken on her trait of naming her special abilities. It was Michiru who saved the Pleiades Saints and convinced them to become magical girls. However, she soon transformed into a witch, leading the Pleiades to learn the truth behind magical girls. Choosing to reject the system, the Pleiades attempted to revive Michiru, eventually leading to the creation of Kazumi.

=== Supporting characters ===
Jubey (ジュゥべえ, Jūbē)
An incubator who contracted the Pleiades Saints, turning them into magical girls. He can absorb the darkness from soul gems directly into his black fur. After he revealed the true nature of magical girls to the Pleiades, Umika rewrote his memories, preventing him from making any further contracts and as such is an individual being rather than an operative of the Incubators. He was created by Niko using one of Kyubey's corpses, so they wouldn't have to use grief seeds. In the end, Jubey eventually dissolved, and it is revealed that his cleaning of soul gems only polished the surface – essentially hiding the corruption – meaning that the magical girls were vulnerable to running out of magic and turning into witches, a fact even he was unaware of.
Souichirou Tachibana (立花 宗一郎, Tachibana Sōichirō)
A man who discovers Kazumi inside a briefcase which was supposed to contain a bomb he had intended to use to blow up a mall as revenge for losing his shop in a bad deal with the mall manager. After Kazumi sees good in him and prevents him from being set up by a possessed detective, he becomes the manager of an Italian restaurant and may be dating Misako.
Misako Ishijima (石島 美佐子, Ishijima Misako)
Misako is a detective investigating the disappearance of several girls, following the disappearance of her friend Remi, who was actually a magical girl. During the first chapter, she had turned into a pseudo-witch and had attempted to kill Kazumi, but was stopped after Kazumi regained her magical girl powers.
Remi Shiina (椎名 レミ, Shīna Remi)
Misako's best friend in high school. She was secretly a magical girl, though her three-year-old sister was aware of her secret. Remi suddenly disappeared one day, and her disappearance along with her sister's story of her being a magical girl spurred Misako into becoming a detective investigating into the existence of magic and the disappearances of young girls.
Kyouka Shida (志田 京香, Shida Kyōka)
A girl who works at a cosmetic store. She was turned into a pseudo-witch by Airi, but was saved by Kazumi, Kaoru and Umika.
Yuuri (ユウリ, Yūri) / Airi Anri (杏里 あいり, Anri Airi)
An evil magical girl out for revenge on the Pleiades Saints, Airi was originally a friend of the real Yuuri Asuka who used her wish her cure of her terminal illness. When Asuka was killed by the Pleiades Saints, her face altered to resemble her friend, Airi formed a contract with Kyubey to become a Magical Girl and attempted to kill Kazumi as her revenge on the Pleiades Saints. But Airi uses too much magical power and transforms into a witch who Kazumi is forced to kill.
Yuuri Asuka (飛鳥 ユウリ, Asuka Yūri)
Airi's best friend who had desires of becoming a famous chef, becoming a Magical Girl to save her friend Airi and using her powers to heal other sick children. But this proved to be Asuka's undoing as she turned into a witch that the Pleiades Saints were forced to kill, causing the events which led to a vengeful Airi becoming a Magical Girl in real Yuuri's image.
Sumire Akane (茜 すみれ, Akane Sumire)
A magical girl that was attacked by the Pleiades Saints. She knew Kaoru because they both played soccer together. She was put into the Freezer post-attack and was eventually turned into a witch by Kanna.
Ayase Souju (双樹 あやせ, Sōju Ayase) / Luca Souju (双樹 ルカ, Sōju Ruka)
Ayase is a magical girl who goes around picking the soul gems out of other magical girls. Her body actually holds two souls, Ayase and Luca, each with their own transformations, as the result of a split personality. They are very protective of each other's soul gems. They are defeated with a joint attack performed by Kazumi and Niko.
Kaede Hinata (日向 かえで, Hinata Kaede)
One of the many magical girls sleeping in the Freezer. She is turned into part of the "Hyades Daybreak" by Kanna.
Kanna Hijiri (聖 カンナ, Hijiri Kanna)
The story's main antagonist. Having been cloned from the original Kanna, Niko, Kanna lived her life with general happiness. When she learned of her true nature after spotting Niko in battle, Kanna swore to get revenge, making a contract with Jubey to become a magical girl by wishing to have the ability to 'connect' to others without drawing attention. Using this ability, she created the evil nuts and used Yuuri and the Souju sisters to exhaust the Pleiades' soul gems, taking Niko's place when she turned into a witch herself. Learning about Kazumi, Kanna made plans to bring about a new species of humans called "Hyades" which she and Kazumi would be a part of as they are both fake humans. Her connect ability also extends to her magic, allowing her to connect to various things, such as making witches obey her. She ends up using this power to combine several witches into a single being called the "Hyades Daybreak".

== Puella Magi Oriko Magica characters ==
=== Oriko Magica characters ===
Oriko Mikuni (美国 織莉子, Mikuni Oriko)
Voiced by: Saori Hayami (Magia Record)
A magical girl with the ability to see into the future. She looked up to her father, who was a government official, until he hanged himself after being caught doing illegal business, which in turn left Oriko betrayed by her classmates. She made a contract to Kyubey wishing to know the meaning of her life, gaining the ability to see into the future, which also gives her foresight in battles, where she attacks using metal orbs.
After seeing a vision of a destructive witch – Kriemhild Gretchen – she cannot possibly defeat, she makes it her goal to kill Madoka in order to prevent her from becoming a witch and destroying the world. She attempts this by nominating Yuma as a magical girl candidate, and sending Kirika to hunt other magical girls, in order to distract Kyubey from making a contact with Madoka. She eventually succeeds in killing Madoka by impaling her on a shard of Kirika's shattered witch form, but dies from a gunshot wound she received from Homura while doing so. She then appears in the new timeline, fully aware of her previous actions, but is supported by the new Kirika and can move on.
In Symmetry Diamond, Oriko instead sees only Walpurgisnacht, and teams up with Kirika to stop it. She later meets Yuma in a park, and eventually helps out the girl by directing her to a new family after learning of her abusive household situation.
Kirika Kure (呉 キリカ, Kure Kirika)
Voiced by: Yuka Iguchi (Magia Record)
A 15-year-old magical girl who uses her powers to hunt down her own kind. As a girl who had no interest in anything and was often bothered, she became infatuated with Oriko, the one person who paid attention to her, and made a contract with Kyubey in order to change her personality, so she could become friends with Oriko. She has a strong admiration for Oriko and will do anything she asks her, including killing other magical girls. When transformed, she wields a pair of powerful claws and has the ability to slow down her enemies (as well as herself), giving the impression of her moving quickly. When Oriko is confronted by the other magical girls, she willingly becomes a witch to protect her, but is ultimately killed by Kyoko, Mami and Yuma. She reappears in the new timeline befriending the depressed Oriko.
The prequel spin-off Noisy Citrine explains her backstory. She was best friends with a girl called Erika Mamiya, but when Erika shoplifted a book due to stress from her parents' divorce, she left the book with Kirika before running off, leaving Kirika to take the blame and feel betrayed by Erika, especially after Erika ended up moving away without giving an explanation. Kirika encounters Erika again when her family moves back to Mitakihara, and ends up saving her from a witch that tried to make Erika commit suicide, after which Erika and Kirika become friends again.
Yuma Chitose (千歳 ゆま, Chitose Yuma)
Voiced by: Misaki Kuno (Magia Record)
A young girl who Kyoko encounters, after Yuma's parents are killed by a witch. She was often abused by her parents, with her mother calling her useless and burning her with cigarettes, and her father neglecting her and never being home. Yuma thus wants to become useful to someone, going into distress whenever she feels useless. Despite Kyoko warning her not to become a magical girl, she ends up becoming one in order to save Kyoko's life, due to Oriko's manipulation. Yuma specializes in healing magic and wields a spherical hammer that resembles a cat.
In the alternate timeline depicted in Symmetry Diamond, she briefly meets Oriko. Oriko then sees a vision where she ends up dying, going into cardiac arrest due to the abuse she received from her mother. At the end of Symmetry Diamond, Oriko and Kirika find a new family for Yuma to live with.
Hisaomi Mikuni (美国 久臣, Mikuni Hisaomi)
A very hardworking man who promised to work for the greater good of everyone. His intention was to reform corrupt governmental policies and eventually bring peace to the entire world. This heavily inspired Oriko's goal and methods as a magical girl. However, it was revealed that he was a secretly unscrupulous man who had been falsifying fund records, and he hanged himself to avoid prosecution, leaving Oriko behind to become a scapegoat in his place. Even so, she refers to him respectfully as "her father in Heaven" and states that she never fully stopped wanting to love or protect him.

=== Extra Story characters ===
Erika Mamiya (間宮 えりか, Mamiya Erika)
Kirika's childhood friend who appears in the Oriko Magica prequel, Noisy Citrine. She had previously moved away from Mitakihara, following a fall-out with Kirika, but recently moved back there with her mother and step-father, where she encounters Kirika once more, unaware of her new personality. Erika sees herself as useless and unable to live up to her new family's expectations, and believes Kirika hates her for moving the blame for Erika's shoplifting onto her, thus leading to her attempting suicide when tempted by a witch. However, she is saved by Kirika, and the two later become friends again. Erika eventually manages to get along with her new family.
Mako Chitose (千歳 眞子, Chitose Mako)
Yuma's abusive mother, who dies at the hand of a witch in Oriko Magica. She gains a speaking role in Symmetry Diamond. Mako is a confrontational, mean woman, who doesn't hesitate to slam doors in the faces of social service agents, or to yell at and threaten her daughter. She is shown to take her frustration and aggression out on Yuma by abusing her in many ways, including putting out lit cigarettes on Yuma's forehead.
Sasa Yuuki (優木 沙々, Yūki Sasa)
A magical girl who appears in the spin-off Symmetry Diamond, arriving in Mitakihara City to claim new territory. She is a magical girl with mind-control abilities. Sasa is a girl who at first appears bubbly and kind, but her cheerful side masks an incredibly vicious and possibly even vengeful side of her. She has a tendency to laugh madly at times. Despite her enthusiastic controlling of witches, Sasa turns out to be horrified at the fact that magical girls themselves become witches. In Symmetry Diamond, after Sasa's plan is thwarted, Oriko reveals to her the fate of magical girls, that they eventually turn into witches. Sasa, horrified, screams how she doesn't want to become a witch and smashes her soul gem, dying.
She makes a reappearance in Sadness Prayer following Komaki's death.

=== Sadness Prayer characters ===
Komaki Asako (浅古 小巻, Asako Komaki)
A magical girl that attends the same school as Oriko. She is generally loud, upfront, and aggressive, but can also be at times calm and genial, mostly around her friends. She made a wish to protect her friends Akira and Miyuki during a fire at school, thus granting her shielding and barrier powers. Her weapon is an axe.
During Sadness Prayer, Komaki slowly becomes friends with Oriko. Komaki regularly sneaks out of home at night to hunt witches; this did not go unnoticed by her younger sister, Koito, who expressed her concerns to one of Komaki's friends, Akira. During a witch hunt, Komaki got into a fight with Kirika over a grief seed, with Kirika unaware that she was Oriko's friend. Akira, who had followed Komaki to find out what she was up to, ran out in the midst of the fight and got hit by one of Kirika's attacks meant for Komaki; this caused Komaki to fly into a rage. Kirika, already shocked by Akira's death and frightened by Komaki's rage, lashed out in a desperate attack and stabbed Komaki through the head, killing her. After learning she had killed Oriko's school friend, Kirika became fearful of her reaction, but recovered quickly after Oriko forgave her.
Komaki previously made a small cameo in Symmetry Diamond, where Oriko warned her not to keep going out at night, lest she run into trouble. Presumably Komaki and Kirika never fought or crossed paths in this timeline. Komaki and Oriko never seem to become friends in this timeline, however.
Koito Asako (浅古 小糸, Asako Koito)
Komaki's younger sister, who is more calmer and friendly than her older sister.
She begins suspecting Komaki of having a nightlife after witnessing her sneaking out at night, and relays her suspicions to Akira, who begins investigating into Komaki's supposed nightlife. It is currently unknown how Koito has taken Komaki's and Akira's deaths.
Akira Namekata (行方 晶, Namekata Akira)
One of Komaki's friends, who attends the same school as Oriko and Komaki. She and Komaki's other friend, Miyuki, often have to interrupt Komaki's fighting with other students. She is also friends with Koito, and nicknames her "Koitotchi" (小糸っち, Koitocchi).
During the story, Akira begins investigating Komaki's supposed nightlife after being informed by Koito. Her parents are overseas at the time, giving her free rein to investigate Komaki. She tracks Komaki with her phone and finds her fighting with Kirika one night. After accidentally calling Koito instead of the police, Akira ditches the phone and runs out to Komaki after one of Kirika's attacks wounds her. Akira, however, gets in the way of another of Kirika's attacks and is cut in half, with her top half landing in Komaki's arms. Her death causes Komaki to fly into a rage.
Akira has a small cameo alongside Komaki and Miyuki in Symmetry Diamond.
Miyuki Nagatsuki (長月 美幸, Nagatsuki Miyuki)
Another of Komaki's friends, who attends school with Oriko, Komaki and Akira. Not much has been seen of Miyuki, but she appears to be a kind and friendly person who occasionally lectures Komaki on her behavior. She was not informed by Akira or Koito about Komaki's nightlife, and appears to have taken Komaki's death badly. She ended up delivering a print-out informing of Komaki's and Akira's deaths to Kirika, which was how Oriko and Kirika found out of their deaths.
Miyuki has a small cameo alongside Akira and Komaki in Symmetry Diamond.
Kimihide Mikuni (美国 公秀, Mikuni Kimihide)
Oriko's uncle. The two seem to have a strained relationship. During his appearance in Sadness Prayer, he is under the influence of a witch's kiss.
Yurako Mikuni (美国 由良子, Mikuni Yurako)
Oriko's mother, who she had a good relationship with. It is currently unknown what has become of her in later installments, though a line in Oriko Magica ("And I'll bet mommy is looking down from heaven and is so proud!") suggested that she, too, died at some point.
Rina (リナ, Rina) and Mio (美緒, Mio)
Two new magical girls who appear in Sadness Prayer post-Komaki's death. Both seems to be associated with Sasa in some way. Mio is killed by Kirika in a surprise attack.

== Puella Magi Suzune Magica characters ==
Suzune Amano (天乃 鈴音, Amano Suzune)
Voiced by: Yoshino Nanjō (Magia Record)
A girl who is a smiling, hard-working student at day, and a stoic magical girl hunter at night. She refuses to state her reasons for killing. Whenever she meets a magical girl, she asks for their name prior to killing them, and later puts writes their name on a paper and puts it in her pouch, a habit she picked up from Tsubaki. Suzune uses a large sword as her weapon and wears a long jacket as her uniform. Her powers are fire-elemental. Suzune is revealed in a flashback to be able to absorb the powers of witches, and she absorbed her current fire powers from Tsubaki's witch.
She was taken care of by her former mentor, Tsubaki, after a witch killed her parents; Suzune's wish was to "become like Tsubaki", leading to her gaining her absorption powers. Despite her statements that she's "doing the right thing", Suzune is still unconvinced she really is doing the right thing. After meeting Kagari, Suzune finds out that her memories were altered: instead of setting out to kill magical girls after killing Tsubaki, Suzune had merely run away and hid herself in despair. Matsuri eventually met up with her and became her friend, but Kagari erased those memories as a part of her revenge plot. After Suzune remembers this and Kagari forces her to confront her anguish, she decides to end her life after killing Kagari's witch and saving Matsuri, but not before telling Matsuri to live on.
Matsuri Hinata (日向 茉莉, Hinata Matsuri)
Voiced by: Rie Murakawa (Magia Record)
One of the Yunagi magical girls, a positive-thinking girl who is classmates with Suzune. She wants to become friends with Suzune, even after finding out that she is a magical girl killer. Her magical weapons are robotic gloves that can shine or shoot bright lights at her opponents, and she also possesses the ability to search for others, though this ability is best used as support in battle. She has a plush charm of a rabbit head named "Usa-chan", and nicknames Kyubey as "Kyu-chan".
Matsuri reveals to Arisa at one point after Haruka's death that she was blind when she was younger, and wished to have sight as a result. Kagari knocks her out upon arrival so she can deal with Suzune alone, but Matsuri wakes up in time to save Suzune and confront Kagari. Despite Kagari's monstrous deeds and attempts on Matsuri's life, Matsuri never tries to kill her and tries to convince Kagari to stop her revenge. She is eaten by Kagari's witch and supposedly dies, but it turns out to only be an illusion, and manages to survive after Suzune defeats the witch. On Suzune's deathbed, Matsuri promises to never forget her, the Yunagi girls, Kagari and Tsubaki, and that they'll stay friends forever. Afterwards, Matsuri inherits the bell-and-pouch pendant and wears it as a hair tie herself. She is the only survivor of the events of the story.
Kagari Hinata (日向 華々莉, Hinata Kagari)
Matsuri's older sister, who is hunting down Suzune in revenge for killing Tsubaki. She has a playfully cruel nature and takes delight in teasing and tormenting Suzune. She seems to have a soft spot for Matsuri, but isn't afraid to kill her if she gets in the way of her goals. She also shows no remorse in murdering Arisa, nor for any of the other deaths she indirectly caused through altering Suzune's memory.
Kagari's magic appears to be illusionary-themed, and she is seen wielding a sword and chakrams. She is also capable of altering people's memories: she used this ability to turn Suzune into a magical girl killer and erase Matsuri's memories of becoming friends with Suzune; however, the person's real memories seem to eventually come back over time, as with Matsuri just before Kagari returns, or in dreams, as with both Matsuri and Suzune. Kagari ends up turning herself into a witch as a last-ditch attempt to kill Suzune, after suffering defeat by Matsuri.
Arisa Narumi (成見 亜里紗, Narumi Arisa)
Voiced by: Kana Ueda (Magia Record)
One of the Yunagi magical girls, and probably the most hot-headed among them. Having been bullied a lot in school, she became a magical girl wishing to become stronger, possessing superhuman strength and speed, leading her to become more self-confident yet abrasive, even putting her former tormentors in hospital; though her attitude scared others off, leading to her being lonely, until Chisato asked her to join the Yunagi group after beating her in a fight. Despite Arisa's abrasiveness, flippant and haughty attitude, she can be caring at times. Arisa wields a scythe as her magical girl weapon, and her soul gem is in the shape of a heart on her back.
She becomes distraught after the death of Chisato, eventually vowing to kill Suzune in revenge; she also returned to being more abrasive, disregardful of school rules, and beating up other students. Unfortunately, Arisa never managed to fulfill her goal, as Kagari killed her in a surprise attack to get her out of the way.
Chisato Shion (詩音 千里, Shion Chisato)
Voiced by: Nao Tōyama (Magia Record)
One of the Yunagi magical girls, and the one who invited Arisa to join them. She is a strict follower of the rules, often lecturing Arisa on her rebellious and lazy attitude. She uses a pistol as part of her weaponry, though she has two on her belt, she is never seen using more than one at a time; her power is to "release" other magic powers. She was killed by Suzune during a night patrol.
It is revealed in a flashback that Chisato convinced Arisa to join the Yunagi girls, after finding out she was lonely after beating her in a fight; another flashback reveals that Chisato's father was a creator of children's picture books and she made a wish to turn him back to being a kind person after he turned abusive, with said abuse leading to the death of his wife, before turning it on Chisato.
Haruka Kanade (奏 遥香, Kanade Haruka)
Voiced by: Eriko Matsui (Magia Record)
The leader of the Yunagi magical girls, and a respectable, well-behaved student. She held a large animosity towards her older sister who was loved and praised by everyone while Haruka was overlooked. Haruka uses a separable blade as her weapon, and specializes in charm magic. After a witch brings up memories of her painful past, where she wished to erase her sister from existence, she succumbs to her despair and becomes a witch herself.
Tsubaki Mikoto (美琴 椿, Mikoto Tsubaki)
Voiced by: Yoko Hikasa (Magia Record)
Suzune's former mentor, who became a witch. Suzune killed her and inherited her bell-and-pouch pendant, which she wears as a hair tie. She formerly took care of Matsuri and Kagari as some form of caretaker, and told them stories; at one point she encouraged Matsuri to be a kind person and listen to her father and Kagari. She took care of Suzune after her parents' death at the hands of a witch, and treated her like her own daughter. She had fire-elemental powers.
Honoka Kanami (佳奈美 穂香, Kanami Honoka)
A minor character from the first chapter, Honoka Kanami is a lone magical girl with a cheerful and friendly personality who dual wields knives with hand guards; her powers and wish are unknown. Her attack power seems to be rather weak. She was saved from a witch by Suzune, but was killed after telling Suzune her name. She was wowed by Suzune's fire-elemental magic.
Mika Nishinaka (西中 ミカ, Nishinaka Mika)
The leader of a group of bullies that targeted Arisa in the past, until Arisa made her wish and scared them off by crushing Mika's hand in her own. She then proceeded to put them in the hospital as revenge; it can be assumed that they left her alone after that.
Kanata Kanade (奏 可奈多, Kanade Kanata)
Haruka's older sister. She was a kindly person who was good at everything she did, leading to her being constantly praised by others and called a genius; however, her little sister Haruka was jealous and envious of her, as she thought no one expected anything of her due to Kanata. Kanata tried to be friendly with Haruka, telling her that she "could tell her big sister anything", but Haruka kept rejecting her and claiming that Kanata didn't understand her feelings. Haruka's immense jealousy eventually led to her wishing to erase Kanata from existence; Kanata appears to have been wiped from others' memories as well.

== Magia Record characters ==
=== Main characters ===
Iroha Tamaki (環いろは, Tamaki Iroha)
Voiced by: Momo Asakura (Japanese); Kira Buckland (English)
Portrayed by: Memi Kakizaki (Magia Record stage play)
A Light-type magical girl who wished for her younger sister's illness to be cured. When this sister in question, Ui Tamaki, went missing, Iroha arrived in Kamihama City in order to find her, meeting more Puella Magi in the city and eventually starting the plot. When she reaches maximum despair, she can summon the Doppel Giovanna.
Yachiyo Nanami (七海やちよ, Nanami Yachiyo)
Voiced by: Sora Amamiya (Japanese); Erika Harlacher (English)
Portrayed by: Mirei Sasaki (Magia Record stage play)
An Aqua-type veteran magical girl, and a native of Kamihama City, having contracted at age twelve. Originally an associate of several other Puella Magi, she decided to become a loner following a girl's transformation into a witch. When she reaches maximum despair, she can summon the Doppel Campanella.
Tsuruno Yui (由比鶴乃, Yui Tsuruno)
Voiced by: Shiina Natsukawa (Japanese); Marieve Herington (English)
Portrayed by: Suzuka Tomita (Magia Record stage play)
A Flame-type hotheaded Puella Magi who wished to win a lottery, ensuring the success of her family's Chinese restaurant. Troublesome and problematic, she is armed with dual fans. When she reaches maximum despair, she can summon the Doppel Yu Hong.
Felicia Mitsuki (深月フェリシア, Mitsuki Ferishia)
Voiced by: Ayane Sakura (Japanese); Lizzie Freeman (English)
Portrayed by Miho Watanabe (Magia Record stage play)
A Dark-type magical girl armed with a gargantuan hammer, that wished to alter the events of her family's death, at the cost of her own memories. Believing her family to be murdered by a witch, she is now motivated by revenge against them and will not stop until every witch in existence lies dead at her feet. When she reaches maximum despair, she can summon the Doppel Beatrice.
Sana Futaba (二葉さな, Futaba Sana)
Voiced by: Yui Ogura (Japanese); Ryan Bartley (English)
Portrayed by Sarina Ushio (Magia Record stage play)
A meek and insecure Forest-type Puella Magi who wished to become invisible following years of verbal abuse from her family that rendered herself wallowing in self-worthlessness. When she reaches maximum despair, she can summon the Doppel Theresia.

=== Wings of Magius ===
Alina Gray (アリナ グレイ, Arina Gurei)
Voiced by: Ayana Taketatsu (Japanese); Cherami Leigh (English)
A Forest-type Puella Magi who wished to have an area where nobody can disturb her. One of the three Magius, Alina is a genius artist who wants to create a world without witches. She has won various awards for her art, and is obsessed with the theme of life and death.
Touka Satomi (里見灯花, Satomi Touka)
Voiced by: Rie Kugimiya (Japanese); Michelle Marie (English)
A Fire-type Puella Magi who is trying to create a world without witches. She is one of the three Magius.
Nemu Hiiragi (柊ねむ, Hiiragi Nemu)
Voiced by: Sumire Morohoshi (Japanese); Mela Lee (English)
A Forest-type Puella Magi who is trying to create a world without witches. She is one of the three Magius.
Mifuyu Azusa (梓みふゆ, Azusa Mifuyu)
Voiced by: Mai Nakahara (Japanese); Allegra Clark (English)
A Dark-type veteran Puella Magi who wished to be free.
Tsukuyo Amane (天音月夜, Amane Tsukuyo)
Voiced by: Maaya Uchida (Japanese); Jennie Kwan (English)
A Dark-type Puella Magi who hopes to eradicate all witches. She is Tsukasa's older twin sister, and is a member of Wing of Magius.
Tsukasa Amane (天音月咲, Amane Tsukasa)
Voiced by: Aya Uchida (Japanese); Kayli Mills (English)
A Light-type Puella Magi who hopes to eradicate all witches. She is Tsukuyo's younger twin sister, and is a member of Wing of Magius.

=== Supporting characters ===
Momoko Togame (十咎ももこ, Togame Momoko)
Voiced by: Mikako Komatsu (Japanese); Erica Lindbeck (English)
A Flame-type magical girl who wished to possess enough courage to confess to the boy she fell in love with. She is always in search of rookie Puella Magi to defend, and takes upon a big-sister like role to other warriors of her kind. When she reaches maximum despair, she can summon the Doppel Elfriede.
Kaede Akino (秋野かえで, Akino Kaede)
Voiced by: Ayaka Ōhashi (Japanese); Brianna Knickerbocker (English)
A Forest-type magical girl who wished to stop the development of a building, as it would ruin her precious garden. In exchange for her wish, she was granted powers related to plants and wildlife. When she reaches maximum despair, she can summon the Doppel Zola.
Rena Minami (水波レナ, Minami Rena)
Voiced by: Kaori Ishihara (Japanese); Erica Mendez (English)
An Aqua-type vitriolic girl who hides her insecurity behind a triumphant façade. Constantly picking fights with her friends, she wished to transform into another person. When she reaches maximum despair, she can summon the Doppel Cendrillon.
Kuroe (黒江, Kuroe)
Voiced by: Kana Hanazawa (Japanese); Faye Mata (English)
A magical girl who appears in the anime version of Magia Record.

== Magia Exedra characters ==
Name (ナマエ, Name)
Voiced by: Akari Komiyama
A "former magical girl" who lost her memories, including her appearance, before reaching the Lighthouse. She now helps A-Q in collecting Memsparks in order to regain what she's lost.
A-Q (???, A-Q)
Voiced by: Ayana Taketatsu
An incubator who is the keeper of the Lighthouse. Despite resembling Kyubey, they don't like to be compared to him, saying they look nothing alike.
Nighthawk (ヨダカ, Yodaka)
Voiced by: Kana Hanazawa
A long-time resident in the Lighthouse who collects junk from around the place and sells them. They also serve as the game's shopkeeper.

=== Cresent Memoria ===
Sumire Yoake (夜明すみれ, Yoake Sumire)
Voiced by: Miku Itō
Fuka Higure (日暮ふうか, Higure Fuka)
Voiced by: Moe Toyota

=== Sorana Magica ===
Sorana Nagiboshi (凪星そらな, Sorana Nagiboshi)
Voiced by: Asaki Yuikawa
Lilly Candy (リリー・キャンディー, Lilly Candy)
Voiced by: Ayasa Itō

== Other characters ==
Pia Undo (雲土 ぴあ, Undo Pia)
A character exclusive to the Puella Magi Madoka Magica crossover with the Japanese mobile game Divine Gate. She is the Madoka universe version of Divine Gate's original character "Wind Pier" (ウィンドピア, Uindopia).
Pia is a pathologically shy girl who, as Wind Pier, in particular is anxious about people seeing her face, often hiding it or covering it with a mask. She would suffer panic attacks, and thus carried around a canister of oxygen. During the crossover story, Pia walks into the Madoka universe via a gate and becomes friends with the main Madoka girls. After learning that they are trapped in a fake world, Pia makes a wish with Kyubey to destroy the fake world, gaining wind-elemental powers and a rapier as her weapon. After the destruction of the fake world, Pia returns to her own world.
