= Eating Raoul =

1982 film by Paul Bartel

- Theatrical release poster
- Directed by: Paul Bartel
- Written by: Richard Blackburn; Paul Bartel
- Produced by: Anne Kimmel
- Starring: Mary Woronov; Paul Bartel; Robert Beltran; Ed Begley Jr. Buck Henry; Susan Saiger
- Cinematography: Gary Thieltges
- Edited by: Alan Toomayan
- Music by: Arlon Ober
- Production companies: Bartel Film; Janus Films
- Distributed by: Twentieth Century-Fox International Classics; Quartet/Films Inc.
- Release date: October 1, 1982
- Running time: 83 minutes
- Country: United States
- Language: English
- Budget: $500,000
- Box office: $1.1 million

Eating Raoul is a 1982 American black comedy film written, directed by and starring Paul Bartel with Mary Woronov, Robert Beltran, Ed Begley Jr., Buck Henry and Susan Saiger. It is about prudish married couple Paul and Mary Bland (Bartel and Woronov) who resort to killing and robbing affluent swingers to earn money for their dream restaurant.

The writers commissioned a single-issue comic book based on the film for promotion; it was created by underground comix creator Kim Deitch.

== Plot ==
Wine snob Paul Bland works at a cheap wine shop and dreams of opening a restaurant. His attractive wife Mary, a nurse, is routinely groped by hospital patients. When Paul is fired, money is tight and they fear losing their dream. Both prudes who disapprove of sex, Paul and Mary sleep in separate twin beds. Their apartment building regularly is the scene of swingers' parties, which they despise.

When a drunk swinger wanders into their apartment and tries to rape Mary, Paul hits him on the head with a cast-iron frying pan, unintentionally killing him. Thinking no one will miss him, they take his money and put his body in the trash compactor. After they kill another swinger the same way, they realize they can make money by killing "rich perverts".

Doris the Dominatrix, a regular at the swingers' parties, advises Paul and Mary to place an ad in the Hollywood Press, which caters to men seeking kinky sex hookups. Mary lures men to the apartment ostensibly to satisfy their sexual fetishes; Paul kills them with the frying pan. They are surprised at how lucrative their scheme is.

To secure Paul's expensive wine collection, they hire locksmith Raoul Mendoza, whose service is a ruse to rob his customers' homes. Sneaking into the Blands' apartment the next night, he stumbles across the corpse of their latest victim. Paul confronts Raoul, and both men realize they are in a compromising position. They strike a deal: neither will report the other to the police, Paul and Mary will pocket their victims' cash, and Raoul will keep their other possessions—splitting any proceeds with them—and dispose of the bodies.

When one of Mary's clients fails to show one night, Paul leaves to buy groceries and a new frying pan, since Mary is squeamish about cooking in the pan they use to kill people. While Mary is alone, the client arrives late and tries to rape her. Raoul drops by and strangles the client to death. He offers Mary a joint and they have sex.

Growing suspicious, Paul follows Raoul and discovers he is selling the victims' bodies to a dog food company, selling their expensive cars, and secretly keeping the money. Continuing their affair, Raoul tries to persuade Mary to run away with him. After Raoul nearly runs down Paul with a car, Paul hires Doris the Dominatrix to use her costuming and roleplaying skills to get rid of him. First she poses as an immigration agent threatening Raoul, a Mexican immigrant, with deportation. Next, she pretends to be a public health worker who diagnoses him with venereal disease. The pills to cure him are actually saltpeter tablets that render him impotent. These schemes fail to deter Raoul's interest in Mary.

To quickly earn more cash to avoid losing the property for their restaurant to another buyer, they attend a swingers' party in search of victims. Mr. Leech, a banker who earlier refused to loan Mary money after she rejected his sexual advances, propositions her at the party. Killing him with a rattail comb, Mary throws his body from a window. While Paul and Mary try to retrieve Mr. Leech's possessions, the party's host, Howard Swine, demands they join the nude guests in the hot tub or leave. Paul loses his temper and hurls an electric space heater into the hot tub, killing all the partygoers. Paul and Mary take their money and sell their cars.

A drunken Raoul breaks into the Blands' apartment and threatens to kill Paul for not sharing the money earned from the swingers' cars. Announcing to Mary that he intends to wed her, he instructs her to kill Paul with the frying pan. Instead, Mary lures Raoul into the kitchen and murders him. Mary confesses her affair with Raoul to Paul, who tells her that he already knows. James, the real estate agent for the purchase of the restaurant property, is expected for dinner soon. With no meat in the house and no time to go grocery shopping, they cook Raoul and serve him for dinner, describing the dish as "Spanish". The Blands buy the building for their new restaurant, Paul and Mary's Country Kitchen.

== Cast ==
- Paul Bartel as Paul Bland
- Mary Woronov as Mary Bland
- Robert Beltran as Raoul Mendoza
- Susan Saiger as Doris the Dominatrix
- Dan Barrows as Bobby R.
- Ed Begley Jr. as Hippie
- Richard Blackburn as James
- Ralph Brannan as Friend
- Hamilton Camp as John Peck
- Billy Curtis as Little Person
- Garry Goodrow as Drunk Swinger
- Buck Henry as Mr. Leech
- Darcy Pulliam as Nurse Sheila
- Allan Rich as Nazi
- John Shearin as Mr. Baker
- Don Steele as Howard Swine
- Anna Mathias as Ms. Adams
- Edie McClurg as Susan
- John Paragon as Sex Shop Owner
- Richard Paul as Mr. Cray

== Critical reception ==
Roger Ebert gave Eating Raoul two stars, explaining: "The movie's got some really funny stuff in it, and I liked a lot of it, and I wouldn't exactly advise not seeing it, but it doesn't quite go that last mile. It doesn't reach for the truly unacceptable excesses, the transcendent breaches of taste, that might have made it inspired instead of merely clever."

Vincent Canby of The New York Times wrote: "One mustn't blunt its pleasures by calling it a laff riot. It is full of smiles, punctuated here and there by marvelously unseemly guffaws, but most of the time it works its little wonders quietly. The comic style is purposely flat, plain and ordinary, like a piece of Pop art."

Rotten Tomatoes gives the film a score of 85%, with an average rating of 6.7 out of 10, based on 20 reviews. The website's critics consensus for the film reads: "Eating Raoul serves up its spectacularly lurid tale with a healthy heaping of pitch-black humor and anarchic vigor." Metacritic, which uses a weighted average, assigned the film a score of 69 out of 100, based on 15 critics, indicating "generally favorable" reviews.

== Home media ==
Eating Raoul was first released in 1984 on VHS by CBS/FOX Video. On April 13, 2004, the long out-of-print film was released on DVD by Columbia TriStar Home Entertainment. On September 25, 2012, The Criterion Collection re-released the film on DVD and Blu-ray.

== Legacy ==
Mary Woronov and Paul Bartel later appeared together as Mary and Paul Bland in a cameo in the film Chopping Mall (1986). Woronov and Robert Beltran appeared again in Night of the Comet (1984) but not as their Eating Raoul characters; the two also starred together in Bartel's feature Scenes from the Class Struggle in Beverly Hills in 1989.

=== Musical ===
Eating Raoul, a stage musical adaptation, was presented off-Broadway in 1992 and also played at the Bridewell Theatre in London in 2000.

=== Planned sequel ===
A sequel, titled Bland Ambition, was planned. The script was written by Paul Bartel and Richard Blackburn. As described by Bartel:

[The film] starts with Paul and Mary Bland happily ensconced in their Country Kitchen, where they're doing a land-office business. The arrogant young Governor of California stops off to have lunch and is furious he is not recognized and permitted to jump the line. In retaliation, he sends a health inspector to close down the Country Kitchen, and Paul and Mary are encouraged by the media to retaliate in kind and run against him for Governor of California.

Bland Ambition was about 10 days from the start of filming in April 1989 when Vestron withdrew its financial backing.

== See also ==
- List of cult films
