= Blood Theatre =

- Promotional poster
- Directed by: Rick Sloane
- Written by: Rick Sloane
- Produced by: Rick Sloane
- Starring: Mary Woronov; Jonathan Blakely; Jenny Cunningham; Joanna Foxx
- Cinematography: Bill Fishman
- Edited by: Rick Sloane
- Music by: Rick Sloane
- Distributed by: Moore Video; Retromedia Entertainment; Active Home Video
- Release date: September 5, 1984
- Running time: 75 minutes
- Country: United States
- Language: English

Blood Theatre (also known as Movie House Massacre) is a 1984 American independent slasher-horror comedy film directed by Rick Sloane and starring Mary Woronov, Jonathan Blakely, Jenny Cunningham, and Joanna Foxx.

The film includes many bizarre movie theater-related deaths, such as being fried inside a popcorn machine, stabbed in the ticket booth, electrocuted by a film projector, decapitated by a projection booth partition, stabbed while a movie is playing on screen, smoke inhalation from burning film, and a telephone receiver which breaks apart while a dying girl screams hysterically into it.

== Plot ==
Dean Murdock, the owner of the Spotlite Theater chain, purchases an abandoned theater that was once the site of a horrific massacre perpetrated by the disgruntled owner on the theater's closing night. He notifies his employees of the chain's acquisition of the property, and promotes several to renovate and subsequently operate the theater. To motivate his employees, he offers a $1,000 bonus that will go to one of them after a test run, much to the chagrin of his incredulous assistant, Miss Blackwell.

Two cheerleader friends of Jennifer, one of the theater's employees, arrive at the abandoned theater to meet her. They find the theater empty, and both are stabbed to death by an unknown man in a tuxedo. During a screening at the main theater, Selena, a disgruntled concession stand employee left out of Murdock's promotion, causes a scene, and is escorted out by Miss Blackwell.

Meanwhile, Jennifer, Adrian, and Malcolm arrive at the abandoned theater property and begin cleaning. The three find some old reels of film upstairs, decide to project them. On the reels, they see a filmed stage play, during which the audience flees in terror as the auditorium fills with smoke. The projector catches fire midway through. Jennifer flees, and witnesses a smiling elderly man in a tuxedo who attempts to choke her before disappearing. Jennifer is so frightened by the incident that she refuses to return until the opening night.

Selena and Darcy request to be transferred to the theater, which Murdock agrees to. Adrian, while at the theater alone, witnesses a typewriter begin typing by itself; the message reads: "Don't be hasty. This theater could be yours." Meanwhile, Lisa and Dee-Dee, two other Spotlite employees dropping off the contents of Jennifer's old locker, are attacked in the auditorium and stabbed to death.

The next day, while Jennifer, Adrian, and Malcolm are in the office, Darcy becomes locked inside the auditorium and is attacked and dragged underneath the stage. The others hear her screams, but upon entering the theater, there is no sight of her. On the theater's opening night, the three await Murdock's arrival, but he is nowhere to be seen. Selena arrives panicked, looking for Darcy, but Adrian sequesters her in a locked room to avoid a scene in front of a local news outfit doing a story on the theater's reopening.

In the projection room, Adrian is attacked by the killer, but fights him off. Malcolm is subsequently electrocuted on the projector, and Adrian is decapitated by a falling window. Locked in the upstairs room, Selena calls Miss Blackwell from a telephone. During the conversation, an invisible force bursts into the room. On the other end, Miss Blackwell hears Selena's screams before the phone receiver inexplicably crumbles in her hands. Jennifer, who had been waiting outside, enters the theater, and finds herself alone in the auditorium, confronted by the killer—he is the original theater owner who perpetrated the massacre years prior, and he envisions Jennifer as his former lover, an usherette from decades ago. He embraces Jennifer, but she stabs him to death. Jennifer phones police from a pay phone outside. Back at the other theater, Murdock belatedly returns from a trip, and Miss Blackwell quits her job.

== Cast ==
- Mary Woronov as Miss Blackwell
- Jenny Cunningham as Jennifer / Ellen
- Jonathan Blakely as Original Owner
  - David Millbern as Original Owner (Younger)
- Andrew Cofrin as Adrian
- Joanna Foxx as Selena
- Stephanie Dillard as Darcy
- Rob-Roy Fletcher as Dean Murdock
- Daniel Schafer as Malcolm
- Cynthia Hartline as Jamie Hart
- Lisa Lindsley as Lisa
- Joni Barnes as Dee-Dee
- Carl Bressler as Pimp
- Troy Martin as Pie Victim
- Tony Goldman as Police Officer
- Paul Schubin as Police Officer
- Bruce Nangle as Ellen's Lover
- Barrie Metz as Multiplex Employee

== Production ==
The majority of the film was shot at the historic Beverly Warner Theater in Beverly Hills, which was also a location in the film Xanadu. It was later demolished and the site became a bank building.

All the films which play at the Spotlite Theater Multiplex in this film, were short films made by Rick Sloane while he attended Los Angeles City College. They include Clown Whores of Hollywood, Chainsaw Chicks, Amputee Hookers and Nightmare Of The Lost Whores.

== Reception ==
Film critic Scott Weinberg wrote: "Rare is the film that fails so resoundingly in two separate genres at the exact same time." TV Guide also criticized the film, calling it "incredibly inept". In 2014 Chiller wrote that the film is considered by some to be one of the worst horror films ever made, but stated that "if you appreciate incredibly ‘80s hair and clothes, and the uniquely bizarre, very intentional humor of director Rick Sloane (Hobgoblins and the Vice Academy series), there is much here that will warm your heart."

=== In other media ===
RiffTrax, consisting of former Mystery Science Theater 3000 alumni Michael J. Nelson, Bill Corbett and Kevin Murphy, spoofed the film on May 9, 2019.

== See also ==
- Horror-of-demonic
- Psychological horror
- Horror-of-personality
- Exploitation film
- Postmodern horror
