= Urban Gothic =

Subgenre of Gothic fiction, film horror and television

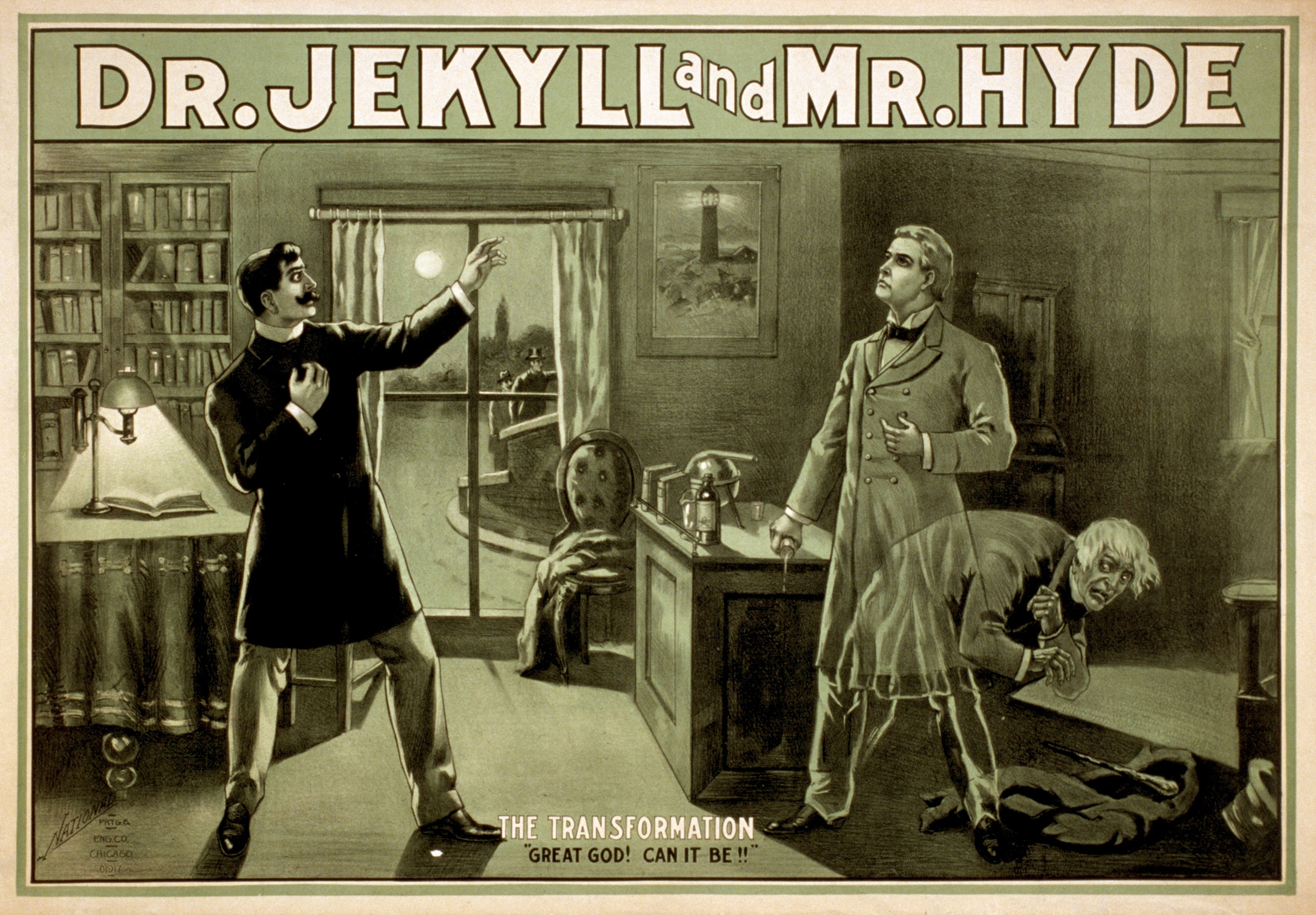
Poster for an 1880s dramatization of Strange Case of Dr Jekyll and Mr Hyde

Urban Gothic is a sub-genre of Gothic fiction, film horror, and television dealing with industrial and post-industrial urban society. It was pioneered in the mid-19th century in Britain, Ireland, and the United States, before being developed in British novels such as Robert Louis Stevenson's Strange Case of Dr Jekyll and Mr Hyde (1886) and Irish novels such as Oscar Wilde's The Picture of Dorian Gray (1890) and Bram Stoker's Dracula (1897). In the twentieth century, urban Gothic influenced the creation of the sub-genres of Southern Gothic and suburban Gothic. From the 1980s, interest in the urban Gothic was revived with books like Anne Rice's Vampire Chronicles and a number of graphic novels that drew on dark city landscapes, leading to adaptations in film including Batman (1989), The Crow (1994) and From Hell (2001), as well as influencing films like Seven (1995).

== History ==
=== Nineteenth century ===
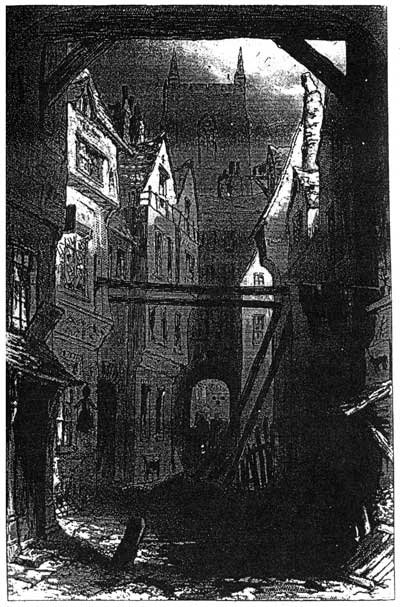
An illustration from Charles Dickens' Bleak House of Tom All Alones, the urban slum credited as a major influence on the development of the genre

Early Gothic fiction tended to use the city as a starting point and then move to rural locations, abandoning the settings and securities of urban civilization for wild and dangerous rural regions. In the mid-nineteenth century, Gothic novels began either to reverse this process or to be conducted entirely in the modern industrial city, which itself became a zone of liminality, danger, and adventure, coming to be referred to in the late twentieth century as urban Gothic. Robert Mighall sees the urban Gothic as a genre arising in London in the mid-nineteenth century out of the critique of the impact of industrialization, leading to the discourse on urban reform that can be seen in City Mystery genre, including The Mysteries of Paris (1842–43) and G. W. M. Reynolds' Mysteries of London (1844–8) as well as Charles Dickens' Oliver Twist (1837–8) and Bleak House (1854). These pointed to the juxtaposition of wealthy, ordered, and affluent civilization against the disorder and barbarity of the poor within the same metropolis. Bleak House in particular is credited with seeing the introduction of urban fog in the novel, which would become a frequent characteristic of urban Gothic literature and film.

The urban Gothic genre that developed in the Victorian fin de siècle, beginning with Robert Louis Stevenson's Strange Case of Dr Jekyll and Mr Hyde (1886), applied the foggy aesthetic and the Gothic trope of doubling to the city. They often incorporated ideas about the influence of modern science on life, and the mixture of science and the supernatural in urban Gothic novels has led Katherine Spencer to describe them as "a mediating form between science fiction and fantasy." Dr Jekyll and Mr Hyde explores traditional debates about the nature of good and evil through motifs from folklore while incorporating a modern, scientific explanation. Oscar Wilde's The Picture of Dorian Gray (1890) similarly revisits the concept of a Faustian Pact in a modern social context. Bram Stoker's Dracula (1897) presents the eastern fringes of Europe in Transylvania as a point of origin for the arrival in modern provincial and then metropolitan London society of a creature from folklore.

=== Twentieth century ===
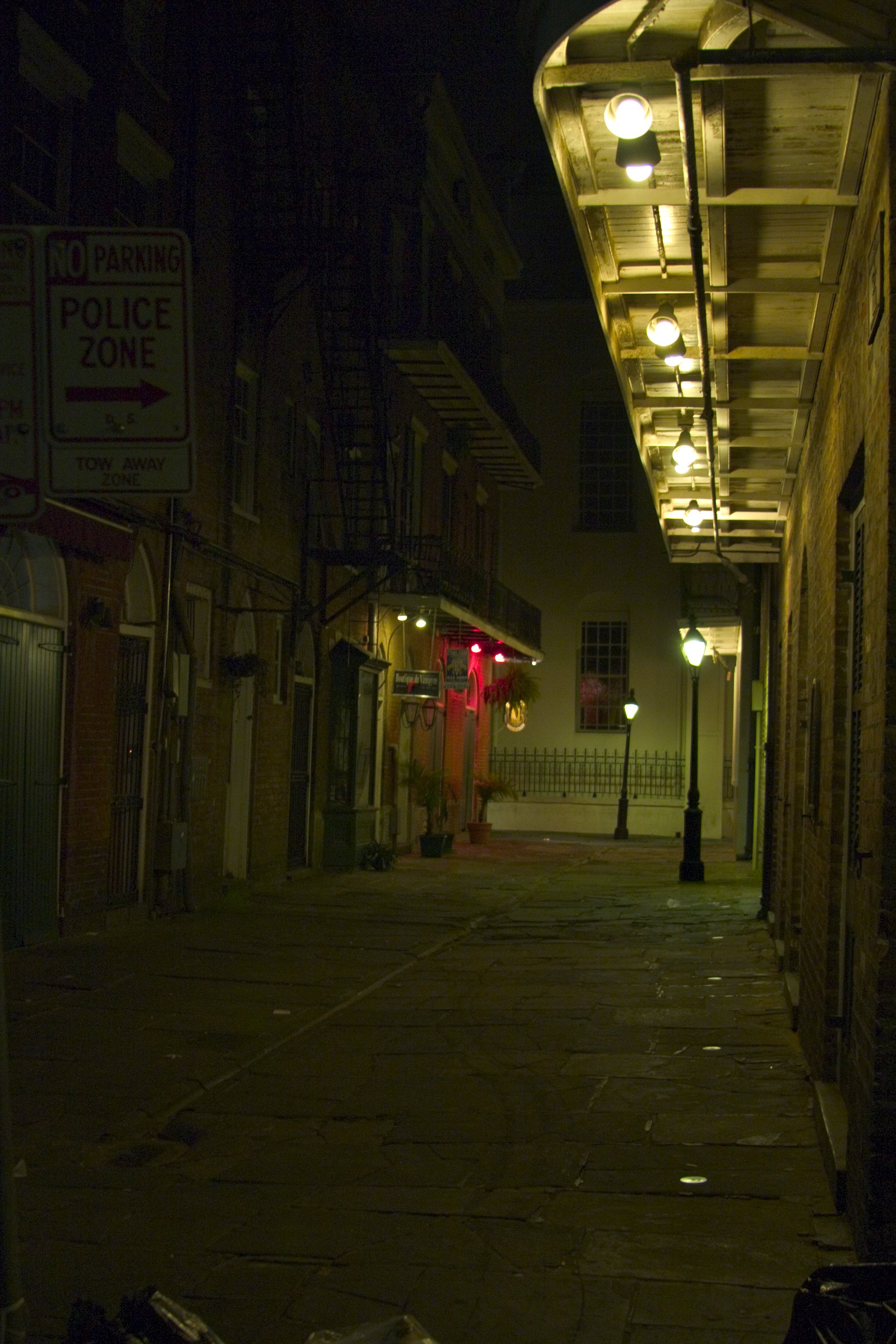
A dark alley in the French Quarter of New Orleans at night, part of the distinctive architecture that made it the centre of Gothic novels by authors including Anne Rice and Poppy Z. Brite

In the early twentieth century, the urban Gothic was extended to other cities, like Paris, such as in Gaston Leroux's The Phantom of the Opera (1909–10). From the twentieth century urban Gothic helped to spawn other sub-genres, including Southern Gothic, using the Southern United States as a location, and later Suburban Gothic, which shifted the focus from the urban centre to the residential periphery of modern society. Since the 1980s Gothic horror fiction and urban Gothic in particular has revived as a genre, with series of novels like Anne Rice's Vampire Chronicles and Poppy Z. Brite's Lost Souls both making New Orleans a key centre of Gothic fantasy. Urban Gothic themes and images were also used in comics and graphic novels, including Frank Miller's Daredevil (from 1979), Batman (from 1986), the Sin City series (from 1991), James O'Barr's The Crow, Alan Moore's From Hell (from 1991) and The League of Extraordinary Gentlemen (1999). Urban Gothic aesthetics and themes are also explored in video games by presenting the city as a threat, often as its own character, as in Silent Hill (1999).

=== Twenty-first century ===
In more recent scholarships, critics have identified certain works as New Urban Gothic. These novels possess the qualities of the urban gothic novel while moving the setting to include more diverse urban spaces. For example, Gina Wisker identifies Sandi Tan's The Black Isle (2012) as an example of an urban gothic set in Singapore. In the novel, Singapore exists as a Gothic city haunted by the ghosts of war and colonialism. The film Suzhou River (2000) also uses Gothic elements to depict the city of Shanghai. Urban gothic elements from the Victorian era carry over to twenty-first century dystopian novels, such as The City and the City by China Miéville.

== Film ==
Urban Gothic novels were among the earliest and most influential works adapted for the cinema, helping to form the genre of horror film. These included Nosferatu (1922), The Phantom of the Opera (1925), Dracula (1931), and Dr. Jekyll and Mr. Hyde (1941). After World War II, emphasis shifted to films that more often drew inspiration from the insecurities of life, utilizing new technology and dividing into the three sub-genres of horror-of-personality, the horror-of-Armageddon and the horror-of-the-demonic. However, during the late 1950s and early 1960s, the British company Hammer Film Productions enjoyed huge international success from Technicolor films involving classic Gothic horror characters, often starring Peter Cushing and Christopher Lee, particularly Dracula (1958), which resulted in many sequels into the 1970s. The 1983 vampire film The Hunger provides a highly influential modernized and urbanized version of Gothic culture. The same themes have been revisited periodically in films like Bram Stoker's Dracula (1992). Seven (1995) is another example of a movie dealing with dark themes in an urban landscape. A comparable film from this century is The Batman (2022), which shares similar gritty elements with Seven (1995).
