= Rick Sloane =

American cult filmmaker (born 1961)

- Born: August 22, 1961 (age 65); Los Angeles, California, U.S.
- Occupation: Filmmaker

Rick Sloane (born August 22, 1961) is an American cult filmmaker. He is credited as writer, director, producer, Film editor and cinematographer of much of his own work. He directed the B-movie film Hobgoblins, which was featured on an episode of Mystery Science Theater 3000.

== Early life ==
Rick attended Hollywood High School in Hollywood, California. At the age of 18, Sloane was inspired by the ultra-low-budget film Hollywood Boulevard. This film was also the directorial debut for Gremlins director Joe Dante, another of Sloane's inspirations. Mary Woronov, one of the stars of "Hollywood Boulevard," agreed to take the lead in Sloane's first feature, Blood Theater, made when he was 21 years old.

Sloane also produced fake trailers for non-existent Grindhouse style films such as Chainsaw Chicks, Amputee Hookers, Nightmare of the Lost Whores and Clown Whores of Hollywood. Sloane was working with 20th Century Fox to promote The Rocky Horror Picture Show and these short films were first shown at The "Third Annual Transylvanian Convention" held in Anaheim, California. It was also the launching of the Rocky Horror sequel "Shock Treatment". Sloane himself organized and produced one of the earliest of these cult conventions in 1981. The event was videotaped and aired on syndicated television that same summer as part of the syndicated special "Rocky Horror Treatment" and later that fall in a segment on NBC, in one of televisions original reality shows, "Real People".

== Career ==
His lesser-known but bigger-budget films include Marked for Murder and Good Girls Don't.

Sloane fulfills many of the roles in his filmmaking; he is a writer, director, producer, editor and cinematographer. Rick retains creative control over his films by self-producing them. He has never directed a film that he didn't write the script himself. By 25 years old, he directed his first three feature films, Blood Theatre, The Visitants and Hobgoblins.

On August 13, 2014, Rick appeared on Ken Reid's TV Guidance Counselor Podcast.

=== Hobgoblins ===
Sloane's third feature Hobgoblins is in the genre of such films as Gremlins and Critters, albeit on a far lesser budget. The plot consists of a young security guard who must track down diminutive creatures who kill people while making their fantasies come true.

Hobgoblins also received attention when it was later shown on Mystery Science Theater 3000. The episode, as usual, made unrelenting fun of the movie and of Sloane in particular, with Tom Servo attempting to use time travel to assault Sloane for making the film—only to give Sloane inspiration for making the movie—at the episode's conclusion. MST3K writer Paul Chaplin later commented on Hobgoblins, saying, "It shoots right to the top of the list of the worst movies we've ever done."

Critics lambasted the film, with efilmcritic.com calling it "Jim Henson's worst nightmare.". A sequel, Hobgoblins 2 has been released by Shout Factory in June 2009, wherein the same puppets and costumes are reused from the first film, and the cast is composed of new actors who resemble the original cast.

The original Hobgoblins is simultaneously being re-released on DVD in widescreen, including director's commentary, and a new documentary, "Hobgoblins: The Making of A DisasterPiece." The documentary includes interviews with original cast members Tom Bartlett (Kevin), Kelley Palmer (Daphne), Steven Boggs (Kyle), Billy Frank (Nick), Tami Clatterbuck (Fantazia), Darran Norris (Club Scum M.C.), Kenneth J. Hall (puppet fabricator), and Rick Sloane (writer and director).

=== Vice Academy ===
The 6-part Vice Academy series, which aired on the USA Network throughout the 1990s, was intended as a sexy spoof-on-a-spoof of the popular Police Academy movie series. Sloane replaced the usual mixed group of odd-ball characters with a sexy cast of females, including Ginger Lynn Allen, Linnea Quigley and Elizabeth Kaitan. The plot features female police cadets in training to join the Hollywood vice squad. Their assignments include infiltrating a child porn operation, and going undercover to join and break up a prostitution ring.

As usual, critics were savage: Sandra Brennan of Allmovie said, "This tale wavers on the fine line between erotic comedy and soft-core porn with a definite leaning toward the latter." However, Sloane contends that there is no actual sex and only ten seconds of nudity in the entire film.

Critic Nathan Shumate commented, "Knowingly insipid to the point of being grotesque... It's a bad, bad, stupid movie, but somehow it fails to grossly offend, mainly because it doesn't try that hard."

== Reviews ==
Reviewers have been ruthless in their criticism of both Sloane and his films. J.P. Harris writes in his review of Hobgoblins:

"Aside from the no-talent acting, everything else in Hobgoblins can be blamed on Rick Sloane, who wrote, produced, directed, edited and photographed this weak comedy."

== Filmography ==
- Blood Theatre (1984)
- The Visitants (1987)
- Vice Academy (1988)
- Hobgoblins (1988)
- Marked for Murder (1989)
- Vice Academy Part 2 (1990)
- Vice Academy Part 3 (1991)
- Mind, Body & Soul (1992)
- Good Girls Don't (1993)
- Vice Academy 4 (1994)
- Vice Academy 5 (1996)
- Babe Watch: Forbidden Parody (1996)
- Vice Academy Part 6 (1998)
- Hobgoblins 2 (2009)
- Hobgoblins: The Making of A DisasterPiece (2009)
