= Tamara Clatterbuck =

American actress

- Born: May 26, 1963 (age 63); Seattle, Washington, U.S.
- Occupation: Actress
- Years active: 1987–present

Tamara Clatterbuck (born May 26, 1963) is an American actress. She appeared in a more than 60 movies and television shows during her career.

== Life and career ==
Clatterbuck was born in Seattle, Washington, but her family moved to Akron, Ohio when she was a child. Her mother is Norwegian and Clatterbuck spent her childhood summers in Norway attending school and learning Norwegian and Swedish. She attended Bowling Green State University in Ohio and later began performing on stage. After moving to New York City, Clatterbuck began appearing on stage. In 1991, she received Drama-Logue Award for her performance in the play How the Other Half Loves.

Clatterbuck made her screen debut starring in the 1988 low-budget comedy-horror film Hobgoblins, and later appeared in Vice Academy (1989) and The Borrower (1991). She co-starred opposite Rutger Hauer and Rebecca De Mornay in the 1993 thriller film Blind Side and later appeared in Set It Off (1996) and City of Industry (1997). On television, Clatterbuck made guest appearances on Murphy Brown, Civil Wars, Murder One, Beverly Hills, 90210, Silk Stalkings, NYPD Blue, The X Files, ER, CSI: Crime Scene Investigation, The Mentalist, Nip/Tuck, Drop Dead Diva, The Bridge and Criminal Minds.

In 1998, Clatterbuck was cast as Alice Johnson in the CBS daytime soap opera, The Young and the Restless, a role she played until 2000, returning in 2005 and 2017. She played Tammy Carson on ABC soap opera General Hospital from 2000 to 2001, and Barb Reiber on NBC soap opera, Days of Our Lives from 2001 to 2002. She starred in the 2000 comedy film Our Lips Are Sealed opposite Mary-Kate and Ashley Olsen. At the 1st Astra Creative Arts TV Awards, Clatterbuck received Best Guest Actress in a Drama Series nomination for her performance in Will Trent.

== Filmography ==
- Battling Amazons (1987) as Georgia
- Hobgoblins (1988) as Fantazia
- Vice Academy (1989) as Tinsel
- UHF (1989) as Talk Show Guest - Dominatrix
- Marked for Murder (1990) as Barmaid
- The Perfect Bride (1991) as Deirdre
- The Borrower (1991) as Michelle Chodiss
- Kiss and Be Killed (1991) as Connie
- Mind, Body & Soul (1992) as Rachael
- Blind Side (1993) as Barbara Hall
- Good Girls Don't (1993) as Effie
- Girls in Prison (1994)
- Mind Rage (1996) as Cyndi Thornburg
- Set It Off (1996) as Luther's Girlfriend
- Lewis & Clark & George (1997) as Blond Hooker
- Payback (1997) as Janet
- City of Industry (1997) as Sunny Egan
- Sour Grapes (1998) as Nurse Donato
- Phoenix (1998) as Waitress
- Vice Academy Part 6 (1998) as Sophisticatia
- Our Lips Are Sealed (2000) as Teri Parker / Shirley Turtleby
- What Matters Most (2001) as Anita Stone
- Under the Influence (2002) as Elaine
- Hallowed Ground (2007) as Waitress
- Dirty Teacher (2013) as Molly's Mom
- Last Rampage (2017) as Carolyn Simmons
