= Golden Reel Award for Outstanding Achievement in Sound Editing – Series 1 Hour – Effects / Foley =

- Country: United States
- Presented by: Motion Picture Sound Editors
- Currently held by: Matthew Collinge, Rob Prynne, Alyn Sclosa, Rob Turner, Adam Oakley, Rob Weatherall, Zoe Freed, Rebecca Heathcote – The Witcher (2021)

The Golden Reel Award for Outstanding Achievement in Sound Editing – Series 1 Hour – Effects / Foley is an annual award given by the Motion Picture Sound Editors. It honors sound editors whose work has warranted merit in the field of television; in this case, their work in the field of sound effects and Foley work in long form broadcast media. It was first awarded in 2002, for episodes premiering the previous year, under the title Best Sound Editing in Television - Effects & Foley, Long Form. The term "long form" was added to the category in 2002, as long form television had been award under the category titled Best Sound Editing - Television Movie of the Week - Effects & Foley, or some moniker of it, since 1998. The award has been given with its current title since 2022. Also in 2022, limited and anthology series were separated from other hour-long programs and given their own category, Outstanding Achievement in Sound Editing – Limited Series or Anthology, though the category was not presented the following year.

== Winners and nominees ==
=== 1990s ===
Year	Program	Nominees	Network
1997	Best Sound Editing - Television Movies of the Week - Sound Effects & Foley		
1997	Old Man	Stephen Grubbs (supervising sound editor); Charles Bruce, Kevin Fisher (sound effects editors)	CBS
1997	Don King: Only in America		HBO
1997	Flash		ABC
1997	Five Desperate Hours	Ray Spiess (ADR editor)	NBC
1997	The Hunchback		TNT
1997	In the Presence of Mine Enemies		Showtime
1997	Tricks		Showtime
1997	Quicksilver Highway		Fox
1997	Steel Chariots		Fox
1998	The Planet of Junior Brown	Michael Baskerville (supervising sound editor); Steve Hammond (supervising Foley editor); Scot Thiessen Gregory, Doug Hubert (sound effects editors); John Bracco, Paul William Edwards (Foley editors)	Showtime
1998	Blade Squad		
1998	Glory & Honor		TNT
1998	Houdini		TNT
1998	The Informant		Showtime
1998	Thanks of a Grateful Nation		Showtime
1998	My Own Country	Robert Jackson (supervising ADR editor), Michael Hertlein (dialogue editor)	
1998	When Trumpets Fade		HBO
1999	Best Sound Editing - Television Movies and Specials - Effects & Foley		
1999	The Devil's Arithmetic	William H. Angarola, Rick Hinson (supervising sound editors); Cindy Rabideau (supervising Foley editor); Mike Marchain (sound editor); Zane D. Bruce, Joseph T. Sabella (Foley artists); Kevin Patrick Burns, Gary Gegan, Matthew Iadarola (re-recording mixers); Don Givens (Foley mixer)	Showtime
1999	H-E Double Hockey Sticks	Mark Friedgen (supervising sound/Foley editor); Bob Costanza, Mike Dickeson, Adriane Marfiak, Richard S. Steele, Lou Thomas (sound editors)	Disney
1999	The Hunley	G. Michael Graham (supervising sound/Foley editor); Bill Bell, Bob Costanza, Mike Dickeson, Mark Friedgen, Gary Macheel, Richard S. Steele, Lou Thomas, Robert Webber (sound editors)	TNT
1999	Purgatory	Mark Friedgen, G. Michael Graham (supervising sound editors); Bob Costanza, Mike Dickeson, Gary Macheel, Adriane Marfiak, Richard S. Steele, Lou Thomas (sound editors)	TNT
1999	You Know My Name	Stephen Grubbs (supervising sound/Foley editor); Joe Earle, Kenneth L. Johnson, Bradley C. Katona, Gary Krause, Brian Thomas Nist, Eric A. Norris (sound effects editors)	TNT
1999	Introducing Dorothy Dandridge	David Hankins, Doug Kent (supervising sound editors); Michael Babcock, Jeff Sawyer, Bruce Tanis (sound editors)	HBO
1999	Witness Protection	Peter Austin (supervising sound/Foley editor); Mitch Gettleman, Kenneth L. Johnson, Bradley C. Katona (sound effects editors); David Melhase (Foley editor)	HBO
1999	Rocky Marciano	Mathew Waters (supervising sound editor/sound designer), Cormac Funge (sound editor), Craig Jurkiewicz (Foley editor)	Showtime

=== 2000s ===
Year	Program	Episode(s)	Nominees	Network
2000	The Virginian		William H. Angarola, Rick Hinson (supervising sound editors); Thomas DeGorter, Mike Marchain, Cindy Rabideau (sound editors)	TNT
2000	For All Time		Mark Friedgen (supervising sound editor); Kristi Johns (supervising ADR editor); Bill Bell, Bob Costanza, Mike Dickeson, Anton Holden, Michael Lyle, Gary Macheel, Richard S. Steele, Tim Terusa, Rusty Tinsley (sound editors)	CBS
2000	Freedom Song		John Leveque (supervising sound editor); Shawn Sykora (supervising Foley editor); Steve Mann, Anthony Milch (sound editors)	TNT
2000	Race Against Time		Bob Newlan (supervising sound editor), Michael Babcock (sound editor)	TNT
2000	Witchblade		Michael E. Lawshe (supervising sound editor); Timothy A. Cleveland, Paul J. Diller, Eric Cameron Hosmer, Rick Hromadka, Wayne O'Brien, Kenneth Young (sound editors); Kerry Malony (Foley editor)	TNT
2000	Noriega: God's Favorite		William H. Angarola, Rick Hinson (supervising sound editors); Anna MacKenzie, Mike Marchain, Cindy Rabideau (sound editors)	Showtime
2000	Operation Sandman		Robert Webber (supervising sound editor); Bill Bell (supervising dialogue editor); Suzanne Angel (supervising ADR editor); Bob Costanza, Joy Ealy, Anton Holden, Scott C. Kolden, Michael Lyle, Adriane Marfiak, Paul N. J. Ottosson, Richard S. Steele, Tim Terusa, Les Wolf (sound editors)	UPN
2000	Ready to Run		John Benson (supervising sound editor); Erik Aadahl, Michael Babcock, Andrew Ellerd (sound editor)	Disney
2001	Best Sound Editing in Television - Effects & Foley, Long Form			
2001	The Lost Battalion		David C. Eichhorn (supervising sound editor); Bob Costanza, Mike Dickeson, Kevin Fisher, Michael Lyle, Gary Macheel, Adriane Marfiak, Paul Menichini, Richard S. Steele (sound effects editors)	A&E
2001	Attila	"Night 1"	Mark Friedgen, Joe Melody (supervising sound editors); Bill Bell, Bob Costanza, Mike Dickeson, David C. Eichhorn, Gary Macheel, Adriane Marfiak, Mark Steele, Richard S. Steele, Lou Thomas (sound editors)	USA
2001	Club Land		Dane Davis, Christopher Sheldon (supervising sound editors); Eddie Kim (sound designer); Lynette Villalobos (supervising Foley editor)	Showtime
2001	The Killing Yard		G. Michael Graham, Burton Weinstein (supervising sound editors); Bill Bell, Bob Costanza, Mike Dickeson, Gary Macheel, Adriane Marfiak, Lou Thomas (sound editors)	Showtime
2001	RoboCop: Prime Directives		Stephen Barden (supervising sound editor); Kevin Banks, Joe Bracciale, J.R. Fountain, Craig Henighan, Stephen Roque (sound editors)	Space
2001	Uprising		Bill Bell, G. Michael Graham (supervising sound editors); Scott Tinsley (supervising Foley editor); Bob Costanza, Mike Dickeson, Kevin Fisher, Gary Macheel, Adriane Marfiak, Mark Steele, Richard S. Steele, Lou Thomas (sound editors)	NBC
2001	When Billie Beat Bobby		Brandon Walker (supervising sound editor), Brad Stephenson (sound editor)	ABC
2002	Best Sound Editing in Television Long Form - Sound Effects & Foley			
2002	Taken		David B. Cohn, Victor Iorillo (supervising sound editors); Andrew Ellerd (sound designer/editor); John Edwards-Younger (supervising Foley editor); Mike Bessinger, Allan Bromberg, Benjamin Martin, Stuart Martin, Brian Thomas Nist, Robert Ramirez, Jeff Sawyer (sound editors)	Sci Fi Channel
2002	Convicted		Mark Allen, Mace Matiosian (supervising sound editors); Trevor Jolly (sound editor)	Showtime
2002	Sightings: Heartland Ghost		Glenn T. Morgan (supervising sound editor); Linda Corbin (supervising Foley editor); Rick Hinson, Sarah Payan (sound editors)	Showtime
2002	Firefly	"Serenity"	Mike Marchain, Cindy Rabideau (supervising sound editors); Robert Guastini, Kevin McCullough (sound editors); Ray Spiess (Foley editor)	Fox
2002	The Junction Boys		G. Michael Graham (supervising sound editor); Bob Costanza, Mike Dickeson, Kevin Fisher, Gary Macheel, Adriane Marfiak, Richard S. Steele, Lou Thomas (sound editors)	ESPN
2002	National Geographic Special	"Skin"	Erik Aadahl (supervising sound editor)	National Geographic Channel
2002	The Pennsylvania Miners' Story		John Benson (supervising sound editor); Duke Brown, Larry Goeb (supervising Foley editors); Michael Babcock, Paul Berolzheimer, Brian Thomas Nist, Jeff Sawyer (sound editors)	ABC
2002	Sniper 2		Richard Taylor (supervising sound/Foley editor), Brian Thomas Nist (supervising sound editor), Jeff Sawyer (sound editor)	TNT
2003	And Starring Pancho Villa as Himself		Zack Davis, Geoffrey G. Rubay (supervising sound editors); Tony Lamberti, Carey Milbradt, Bruce Tanis, Karen Vassar Triest, David Williams (sound editors)	HBO
2003	44 Minutes: The North Hollywood Shoot-Out		Vince Gutierrez (supervising sound editor); Scott C. Kolden, Guy Tsujimoto (sound editors)	FX
2003	Helen of Troy		Peter Austin, Kelly Oxford (supervising sound editor); Bob Beher, Edmond J. Coblentz Jr., Lisle Engle, Tim Kimmel, Paul Longstaffe (sound editors)	USA
2003	Hitler: The Rise of Evil		Tom Bjelic, John Douglas Smith (supervising sound editors); Rob Bertola, Paul Shikata (sound editors)	CBS
2003	Ice Bound: A Woman's Survival at the South Pole		Janice Ierulli (supervising sound editor); Mark Shnuriwsky, Jane Tattersall (sound effects editors)	CBS
2003	Salem Witch Trials		David McCallum (supervising sound editor); David Rose, Robert Warchol (sound editors)	CBS
2003	Saving Jessica Lynch		Robert Webber (supervising sound editor); Bill Bell (supervising Foley editor); Bob Costanza, Kevin Fisher, Mark Friedgen, Gary Macheel, Adriane Marfiak, Gary Macheel, Richard S. Steele, Lou Thomas (sound editors)	NBC
2003	Word of Honor		Jane Tattersall (supervising sound editor), Roderick Deogrades (sound effects editor)	TNT
2004	CSI: Miami	"Crime Wave"	Ann Hadsell (supervising sound editor), Bradley C. Katona (sound designer), Ruth Adelman (supervising Foley editor), William Smith (sound effects/Foley editor), Edmond J. Coblentz Jr. (sound effects editor)	CBS
2004	Frankenstein		Trevor Jolly (supervising sound/Foley editor), Mark Allen (supervising sound editor, sound effects editor), Marc Glassman (sound effects editor)	USA
2004	The Hollow		Mark Lanza (supervising sound editor), David Ball (supervising Foley editor, sound effects editor), Steve Mann (sound effects editor)	ABC Family
2004	The Librarian: Quest for the Spear		Mark Friedgen (supervising sound editor); Bill Bell, Bob Costanza, Mike Dickeson, Gary Macheel, Adriane Marfiak, Richard S. Steele, Lou Thomas (sound effects editors)	TNT
2004	The Winning Season		Stephen Grubbs (supervising sound editor); Bob Costanza, Mike Dickeson, Gary Macheel, Adriane Marfiak, Richard S. Steele (sound effects editors)	TNT
2004	The Life and Death of Peter Sellers		Tim Hands (supervising sound editor), Geoffrey G. Rubay (sound effects editor), James Mather (Foley editor)	HBO
2004	Meltdown		Mark Kamps (supervising sound editor); Andrew Ellerd, Todd Murakami, Robert Ramirez (sound editor)	Fox
2004	Spartacus	"Part 2"	Mark Friedgen (supervising sound editor); Billy B. Bell, Bob Costanza, Mike Dickeson, Gary Macheel, Adriane Marfiak, Richard S. Steele, Lou Thomas, Robert Webber (sound effects editors)	USA
2005	Into the West	"Manifest Destiny"	G. Michael Graham (supervising sound editor); Sean Byrne, Bob Costanza, Mike Dickeson, Gary Macheel, Adriane Marfiak, Lou Thomas (sound editors); Tim Chilton, Jill Schachne (Foley artists)	TNT
2005	Category 7: The End of the World	"Part 1"	Joe Melody (supervising sound editor); Kevin Fisher (sound editor); Tim Chilton, Sharon Michaels (Foley artists)	CBS
2005	CSI: Crime Scene Investigation	"Grave Danger, Volume 1"	Mace Matiosian (supervising sound editor); William Smith (sound/Foley editor); David F. Van Slyke (sound editor); Shane Bruce, Zane D. Bruce, Jeff Gunn, Joseph T. Sabella (Foley artists)	CBS
2005	Murdoch Mysteries	"Under the Dragon's Tail"	Mark Beck (supervising sound editor), Steve Hammond (supervising Foley editor, Foley artist)	Citytv
2005	Sleeper Cell	"Hijack" and "Youmud Din"	Mark Kamps (supervising sound editor); Mark Cookson, Todd Murakami (sound editors); Dale W. Perry (Foley artists)	Showtime
2006	Best Sound Editing in Sound Effects and Foley for Television - Long Form			
2006	Nightmares & Dreamscapes: From the Stories of Stephen King	"Battleground"	G. Michael Graham (supervising sound editor); Bill Bell (supervising Foley editor); Bob Costanza, Devon Heffley Curry, Mike Dickeson, Anton Holden (sound editors); Tim Chilton, Sharon Michaels, Jill Schachne (Foley artists)	TNT
2006	Battlestar Galactica	"Occupation/Precipice"	Jack Levy (supervising sound editor); Daniel Colman (sound designer); Doug Madick, Richard Partlow (Foley artists)	Sci Fi
2006	Eureka	"Pilot"	Jack Levy (supervising sound editor); Daniel Colman (sound designer, Foley editor); Jeff K. Brunello; Glenn Oyabe (sound effects editors); Doug Madick (Foley artist)	Sci Fi
2006	Fallen		David C. Eichhorn (supervising sound editor), Mark Lanza (sound designer), Michael Mullane (sound editor), Noel Vought (Foley artist)	ABC Family
2006	The Path to 9/11		G. Michael Graham (supervising sound editor); Richard S. Steele (sound designer); Bill Bell (supervising Foley editor); Sean Bryne, Bob Costanza, Mike Dickeson, Kevin Fisher (sound editors); Tim Chilton, Sharon Michaels, Jill Schachne (Foley artists)	ABC
2007	Best Sound Editing - Sound Effects and Foley for Long Form Television			
2007	Bury My Heart at Wounded Knee		Stephen Hunter Flick (supervising sound editor/designer); Avram D. Gold (supervising sound editor); Paul Berolzheimer, Dean Beville, Adam Johnston, Jeff Sawyer, Kenneth Young (sound editors); David Fine, Hilda Hodges (Foley artists)	HBO
2007	Battlestar Galactica	"Razor"	Daniel Colman (supervising sound editor/designer); Jack Levy (supervising sound editor); Sam C. Lewis (supervising Foley editor); Doug Madick, Richard Partlow (Foley artists)	Sci Fi
2007	Lost	"Through the Looking Glass"	Thomas DeGorter (supervising sound editor); Paula Fairfield, Carla Murray (sound designers); Joseph Schultz, Geordy Sincavage, Scott Weber (sound editors); Cynthia Merrill, Doug Reed (Foley artists)	ABC
2007	Mitch Albom's For One More Day		Scott Hecker, Miguel Rivera (supervising sound editors); Rick Hromadka (sound designer); Roy Seeger (supervising Foley editor); Terry Garcia (assistant sound editor); Michael Broomberg, Gary A. Hecker (Foley artists); Brad Brock (Foley mixer)	ABC
2007	Ruffian		William H. Angarola, Jon Mete (supervising sound editors); Mace Matiosian (supervising Foley editor), David Barbee, Mark Cleary, Tim Farrell, Edmond J. Coblentz Jr., Hugh Murphy (sound designers); George Haddad (sound effects editor)	ESPN
2008	Crusoe	"Rum and Gunpowder"	Peter Lopata, Luc Mandeville (supervising sound editor/designers, sound effects editors); Anton Fischlin (sound effects editor); Alexis Farand, Paul Hubert (Foley artists)	NBC
2008	Fringe	"Pilot"	Walter Newman (supervising sound editor/designer); Bob Redpath (supervising sound editor); Michael Ferdie (sound effects editor); Adam Johnston, Ron Salaises, David Werntz, Kenneth Young (sound editors); Casey J. Crabtree (Foley artist)	Fox
2008	Generation Kill	"A Burning Dog"	Stefan Henrix (supervising sound editor); Andy Kennedy (sound designer); David Evans, Graham Headicar, Lee Walpole, Jack Whittaker (sound effects editors); Virginia Thorn (Foley editor); Andrea King, Jack Stew (Foley artists)	HBO
2008	Knight Rider		Jeffrey Rosen (supervising sound editor); Brad North (sound designer); Craig T. Rosevear (supervising Foley editor); Lee Gilmore, Aaron D. Weisblatt (sound editors); Michael Lyle, Paul Stevenson (Foley artists)	NBC
2009	Best Sound Editing - Long Form Sound Effects and Foley in Television			
2009	Battlestar Galactica	"Daybreak, Part 2"	Daniel Colman (supervising sound editor/designer); Jack Levy (supervising sound editor); Sam C. Lewis (supervising Foley editor); Doug Madick, Richard Partlow (Foley artists)	Sci Fi
2009	House	"Broken"	Brad North (supervising sound/ADR editor); Luis Galdames (sound designer/effects editor); Craig T. Rosevear (supervising Foley editor); Richard Thomas (Foley editor); Michael Lyle, Paul Stevenson (Foley artists)	Fox
2009	Skyrunners		Eileen Horta (supervising sound editor/Foley editor); David Baldwin, Mark Cleary (sound designers/effects editors); Mark Beck, George Haddad, Kevin McCullough, Mark Shnuriwsky (sound effects editors); Steve Hammond, Yishai Kornbluth (Foley editors); Joseph T. Sabella (Foley artist)	Disney XD
2009	Warehouse 13	"Pilot"	Daniel Colman (supervising sound editor/designer); Jack Levy (supervising sound editor); Sam C. Lewis (supervising Foley editor); Doug Madick, Richard Partlow (Foley artists)	Sci Fi
2009	Wizards of Waverly Place: The Movie		Thomas DeGorter (supervising sound editor); Michael Ferdie (sound designer/editor); Geordy Sincavage (supervising Foley editor); Joseph Schultz (sound editor); James Bailey, Doug Reed (Foley artists)	Disney Channel

=== 2010s ===
Year	Program	Episode(s)	Nominees	Network
2010	The Pacific	"Peleliu Landing"	Tom Bellfort (supervising sound/Foley editor); Hector C. Gika (sound effects/Foley editor); Paul Aulicino, Benjamin L. Cook, Charles Maynes (sound effects editors); Katherine Rose, Jody Thomas (Foley artists)	HBO
2010	The Walking Dead	"Days Gone Bye"	Walter Newman (supervising sound editor/designer); Kenneth Young (supervising sound editor, sound effects editor); Jerry Edemann (supervising Foley editor); Darleen Stoker (sound effects editor); Peter Reynolds (Foley editor); David Lee Fein, Hilda Hodges (Foley artists)	AMC
2010	Temple Grandin		Bryan Bowen (supervising sound editor); Bruce Tanis (sound editor); David Lee Fein, Hilda Hodges (Foley artists)	HBO
2011	The Walking Dead	"What Lies Ahead"	Jerry Ross (supervising sound editor); Phil Barrie, Jerry Edemann, Tim Farrell (sound editors); Gregg Barbanell, Pamela Kahn (Foley artists)	AMC
2011	Cinema Verite		Douglas Murray (supervising sound editor); Steve Bissinger (sound designer); Kim Foscato (supervising Foley editor); Larry Oatfield, Robert Shoup (sound editors); Goro Koyama, Andy Malcolm (Foley artists)	HBO
2011	Homeland	"Marine One"	Craig A. Dellinger (supervising sound editor); Jonathan Golodner (sound designer); Shawn Kennelly (supervising Foley editor); Rickley W. Dumm, Mark Lanza, Mark Petersen (sound editors); Vince Nicastro (Foley artist)	Showtime
2011	Red Faction: Origins		Jack Levy (supervising sound editor); Jeff K. Brunello (sound designer); Sam C. Lewis (supervising Foley editor); Candice Brunello (sound effects editor); Miriam Cole (Foley editor); Ginger Geary, Doug Madick (Foley artists)	Syfy
2011	Terra Nova	"Occupation/Resistance"	Christopher Harvengt (supervising sound editor); G. Michael Graham, Richard S. Steele (sound designers); Bill Bell (supervising Foley editor); Bob Costanza, Mike Dickeson (sound effects editors); Tim Chilton, Jill Schachne (Foley artists)	Fox
2012	Game of Thrones	"Valar Morghulis"	Peter Brown (supervising sound editor); Stephen P. Robinson, Jon Title (sound designers); Paul Aulicino (supervising Foley editor); Brett Voss (Foley editor); James Moriana, Jeffrey Wilhoit (Foley artists)	HBO
2012	Coma		David B. Cohn, Bernard Weiser (supervising sound editors); Mark Lanza (sound designer); Rickley W. Dumm, Angelo Palazzo (sound effects editors); Robin Harlan, Sarah Monet, Mike Pipgras (Foley artists)	A&E
2012	Hemingway & Gellhorn		Douglas Murray (supervising sound editor); Pete Horner (sound designer); Kim Foscato (supervising Foley editor); Steve Boeddeker, Andrea Gard, Pat Jackson, Casey Langfelder (sound editors); Goro Koyama, Andy Malcolm (Foley artists)	HBO
2012	The Newsroom	"We Just Decided To"	Mark Relyea (supervising sound editor); David Barbee (sound designer); Kevin McCullough (Foley editor); James Bailey, Joseph T. Sabella, Damien Smith (Foley artists)	HBO
2012	Seal Team Six: The Raid on Osama Bin Laden		Trip Brock, Peter D. Lago (supervising sound editors); Greg Mauer (supervising Foley editor); Steven Avila, Alexander Pugh (sound effects editors); Kate Sheil (Foley editor); Rick Owens (Foley artist)	Nat Geo
2013	Sons of Anarchy	"Salvage"	Erich Gann (supervising sound editor); Bob Costanza, Mike Dickeson (sound designers); Bill Bell (supervising Foley editor); Tim Chilton, Jill Schachne (Foley artists); Kevin Meltcher (assistant sound editor)	FX
2013	The Bible	"In the Beginning"	Marc Lawes (supervising sound editor); Simon Gershon, Jeremy Price (sound designers); Claire Mahoney, Jason Swanscott (Foley artist)	History
2013	Defiance	"Pilot"	Daniel Colman (supervising sound editor/designer); Jack Levy (supervising sound editor); Jeff K. Brunello (sound designer); Sam C. Lewis (supervising Foley editor); Tara Blume, Brian Straub (Foley artists)	Syfy
2013	Survival Code		Kevin Howard (supervising sound editor/designer, sound effects editor); Rob Hegedus (supervising sound editor); Nathan Robitaille (sound designer/effects editor); Kevin Schultz, Randy Wilson (supervising Foley editors); Sid Lieberman (Foley artist)	Syfy
2013	Killing Kennedy		Larry Goeb (supervising sound editor); Jonathan Golodner, Mark Petersen (sound designers); Shawn Kennelly (supervising Foley editor); Takako Ishikawa (Foley editor); Melissa Kennelly, Vince Nicastro (Foley artists)	Nat Geo
2014	Houdini	"Part 1"	Michael J. Benavente (supervising sound editor); Robert Ulrich (supervising Foley editor); Timothy A. Cleveland, Paul J. Diller, Gary Megregian, Michael Sana, John Snider (sound effects editors); Rachel Corrales, Ryan Maguire (Foley editors); Joan Rowe (Foley artist)	History
2014	Isa		Tom Boykin, Eric Lalicata (supervising sound editors); Zach Goheen (sound designer); Kyle Lane (supervising Foley editor); Ryan Gegenheimer (sound effects editor); Tara Blume (Foley artist)	Syfy
2014	Klondike	"Part 1"	Lee Walpole (supervising sound editor); Frank Laratta (sound designer); Catherine Thomas (supervising Foley editor); Joe Beal, Andy Kennedy, Juraj Mravec, John Sawa (sound effects editors); Peter Burgis, Sue Harding (Foley artists)	Discovery
2014	Lizzie Borden Took an Ax		Bernard Weiser (supervising sound editor/designer); Mike Pipgras (supervising Foley editor); Mark Lanza, Mark Petersen (sound effects editors); Jonathan Golodner (Foley editor); Anita Cannella, Amy Kane (Foley artists)	Lifetime
2014	The Normal Heart		Gary Megregian (supervising sound editor); Timothy A. Cleveland, John Petaja (sound designers); Scott Curtis (supervising Foley editor); Paul J. Diller (sound effects editor); Dawn Lunsford, Alicia Stevenson (Foley artists)	HBO
2015	Texas Rising	"Vengeance is Mine"	Tom Bjelic (supervising sound editor/designer); John Laing (supervising sound editor); Steve Baine (supervising Foley editor); Michael Mancuso, Adam Stein, Tyler Whitham (sound effects editors); Simon Meilleur (Foley artist)	History
2015	Bessie		Damian Volpe (supervising sound editor); Kris Fenske (sound designer); Bill Sweeney (supervising Foley editor); Heather Gross, Dave Paterson (sound effects editors); Jay Peck (Foley artist)	HBO
2015	True Detective	"Omega Station"	Mandell Winter (supervising sound editor); David Esparza (sound designer); Eryne Prine (supervising Foley editor); Casey Genton (sound effects editor); Melissa Kennelly, Vince Nicastro (Foley artists)	HBO
2015	CSI: Crime Scene Investigation	"Immortality"	Mace Matiosian (supervising sound editor); David F. Van Slyke (sound designer/effects editor); Joan Rowe, Joseph T. Sabella (Foley artists)	CBS
2015	Sons of Liberty	"A Dangerous Game"	Ruy García (supervising sound editor/designer); Louis Bertini (supervising sound editor); Steven Visscher (supervising Foley editor); Sean Garnhart, Bill Orrico (sound effects editors); Brian Vancho (Foley artist)	History
2015	Tut	"Part One: Power"	Michael J. Benavente, Craig Mann (supervising sound editors); Trent Richmond (supervising Foley editor); Nancy MacLeod, Daniel Pagan, Bruce Tanis (sound effects editors); Ryan Lukasik (Foley editor); Stefan Fraticelli, John Sievert (Foley artists);	Spike
2016	Westworld	"The Bicameral Mind"	Thomas DeGorter, Matt Sawelson (supervising sound editors); Mark Allen, Marc Glassman (sound designers); Michael S. Head, Geordy Sincavage (Foley editors); Tara Blume, Rick Owens (Foley artists)	HBO
2016	Preacher	"Pilot"	Michael Babcock (supervising sound editor/designer); Chris Diebold (sound designer); Ian Herzon (sound effects editor); Gregg Barbanell, Catherine Harper (Foley artists)	AMC
2016	Roots	"Part 1"	Gary Megregian (supervising sound editor); Timothy A. Cleveland (sound designer); Paul J. Diller, Marcello Dubaz, John Snider (sound effects editors); Mitchell Lestner (Foley editor); Ginger Geary, Noel Vought (Foley artists)	History
2016	Sherlock	"The Abominable Bride"	Doug Sinclair (supervising sound editor); Stuart McCowan, Jon Salmon-Joyce (sound effects editors); Jamie Talbutt (Foley editor); Julie Ankerson (Foley artist)	PBS
2016	War & Peace	"Episode 4"	Lee Walpole (supervising sound editor); Saoirse Christopherson, Alex Ellerington, Andy Kennedy, Danton Tanimura (sound effects editors); Sarah Elias (Foley editor); Andie Derrick, Catherine Thomas (Foley artists)	A&E, History, Lifetime
2017	Outstanding Achievement in Sound Editing - Sound Effects and Foley for Episodic Long Form Broadcast Media			
2017	Godless	"Homecoming"	Eric Hoehn, Wylie Stateman (supervising sound editor); Harry Cohen, Hector C. Gika, Sylvain Lasseur, Leo Marcil, Jackie Zhou (sound effects editors)	Netflix
2017	Ozark	"The Toll"	Kurt Nicholas Forshager, Stephen Grubbs (supervising sound editors); Matt Temple (sound effects editor); Jeffrey Cranford, Daniel Raphael (Foley editors); Tim Chilton, Ginger Geary, Jill Schachne, Jerry Trent (Foley artists)	Netflix
2017	Gotham	"Destiny Calling"	George Haddad (supervising sound editor, sound effects editor); Chad J. Hughes (sound designer); David Barbee (sound effects editor); James B. Howe (Foley editor); Joan Rowe, Joseph T. Sabella (Foley artists)	Fox
2017	Black Mirror	"USS Callister"	Kenny Clark (supervising sound editor, sound effects editor); Dario Swade (Foley editor); Ricky Butt, Oliver Ferris (Foley artists)	Netflix
2017	The Long Road Home	"The Road to War"	G.W. Brown, Gregory King (supervising sound editors); Yann Delpuech, Dan Gamache, Jon Greasley (sound effects editors); Jason Charbonneau, John Sievert (Foley artists)	NatGeo
2018	Altered Carbon	"Out of the Past"	Brett Hinton (supervising sound editor); Mark Allen, Owen Granich-Young, Austin Krier (sound effects editors); Noel Vought (Foley artist)	Netflix
2018	Castle Rock	"Severance"	Tim Kimmel (supervising sound editor); Bradley C. Katona (sound effects editor); Brett Voss (Foley editor); Dylan Tuomy-Wilhoit, Jeffrey Wilhoit (Foley artists)	Hulu
2018	The Haunting of Hill House	"Two Storms"	Trevor Gates (supervising sound editor); Paul B. Knox (sound effects editor); Mike Horton, Tim McKeown, Walter Spencer (Foley artists)	Netflix
2018	Homeland	"All In"	Craig A. Dellinger (supervising sound editor); Eric Raber (sound effects editor); Shawn Kennelly (Foley editor); Melissa Kennelly, Vince Nicastro (Foley artists)	Showtime
2018	Patrick Melrose	"Bad News"	Tony Gibson (supervising sound editor); Glen Gathard (supervising Foley editor); Lewis Todd (sound effects editor); Lilly Blazewicz (Foley editor); Peter Burgis, Zoe Freed, Jason Swanscott (Foley artists)	Showtime
2018	The Man in the High Castle	"Jahr Null"	Thomas O'Neil Younkman (supervising sound editor/designer); John Snider (sound designer/effects editor); Mitchell Lestner (sound effects/Foley editor); Zane D. Bruce, Lindsay Pepper (Foley artists)	Amazon
2018	Tom Clancy's Jack Ryan	"Pilot"	Benjamin L. Cook (supervising sound editor); David Esparza, Hector C. Gika, Shaughnessy Hare, Jon Wakeham (sound effects editors); Brett Voss (Foley editor); Dylan Tuomy-Wilhoit, Jeffrey Wilhoit (Foley artists)	Amazon
2018	Westworld	"Virtù e Fortuna"	Thomas DeGorter (supervising sound editor); Mark Allen (sound designer); Marc Glassman, Brett Hinton (sound effects editors); Geordy Sincavage (Foley editor); Tara Blume, Rick Owens, Matt Salib (Foley artists)	HBO
2019	Chernobyl	"1:23:45"	Stefan Henrix (supervising sound editor); Joe Beal (sound designer); Philip Clements, Tom Stewart (Foley editors); Anna Wright (Foley artist)	HBO
2019	The Dark Crystal: Age of Resistance	"What Was Sundered and Undone"	Tim Nielsen (supervising sound editor/sound designer); David Farmer (sound designer); Jonathan Borland, Lee Gilmore, Addison Teague, Andre Zweers (sound effects editors); Anthony De Francesco (Foley editor); Shelley Roden, John Roesch (Foley artists)	Netflix
2019	Peaky Blinder	"Strategy"	Jim Goddard (supervising sound editor); Sarah Elias (sound effects editor); Tom Stewart (Foley editor); Catherine Thomas, Anna Wright (Foley artists)	Netflix
2019	Stranger Things	"Chapter Eight: The Battle of Starcourt"	Will Files, Craig Henighan (supervising sound editors); Katie Halliday, Angelo Palazzo (sound effects editors); Steve Baine (Foley artist)	Netflix
2019	Black Mirror	"Striking Vipers"	Steve Browell (supervising sound editor/sound designer), Mathias Schuster (Foley editor), Barnaby Smyth (Foley artist)	Netflix
2019	Game of Thrones	"The Bells"	Tim Kimmel (supervising sound editor); Paula Fairfield (sound designer); Luke Gibleon, Bradley C. Katona (sound effects editors); Brett Voss (Foley editor); Dylan Tuomy-Wilhoit, Jeffrey Wilhoit (Foley artists)	HBO
2019	True Detective	"The Great War and Modern Memory"	Mandell Winter (supervising sound editor); David Esparza (sound designer); Ryan Collins (sound effects editor); Eryne Prine (Foley editor); Robin Harlan, Sarah Monat (Foley artists)	HBO
2019	Watchmen	"This Extraordinary Being"	Brad North (supervising sound editor), Harry Cohen (sound designer), Jordan Wilby (sound effects editor), Antony Zeller (Foley editor), Zane D. Bruce (Foley artist)	HBO

=== 2020s ===
Year	Program	Episode(s)	Nominees	Network
2020	The Queen's Gambit	"End Game"	Eric Hirsch, Gregg Swiatlowski (supervising sound editor); Wylie Stateman (sound designer); Patrick Cicero, Eric Hoehn, Leo Marcil, James David Redding III (sound effects editors); Rachel Chancey (Foley artist/editor)	Netflix
2020	Star Trek: Picard	"Et in Arcadia Ego, Part 2"	Matthew E. Taylor (supervising sound editor); Harry Cohen, Tim Farrell (sound designers); Michael Schapiro (sound effects editors); Darrin Mann, Clay Webber (Foley editors); Alyson Dee Moore, Chris Moriana (Foley artists)	CBS All Access
2020	Better Call Saul	"Bagman"	Nick Forshager, Kathryn Madsen (supervising sound editors); Todd Toon (sound designer); Matt Temple (sound effects editor); Jeff Cranford (Foley editor); Gregg Barbanell, Alex Ulrich (Foley artists)	AMC
2020	Devs	"Episode 3"	Glenn Freemantle (supervising sound editor/sound designer); Ben Barker (supervising sound editor); Danny Freemantle, Nick Freemantle, Dayo James, Rob Malone (sound effects editors); Lilly Blazewicz (Foley editor); Peter Burgis, Zoe Freed (Foley artists)	FX
2020	Ozark	"All In"	Nick Forshager (supervising sound editor); Mark Allen, Matt Decker, Matt Temple (sound effects editors); Amy Barber, Jonathan Bruce, Julia Huberman (Foley editors); Jonathan Bruce, Ben Parker (Foley artists)	Netflix
2020	Raised By Wolves	"Raised By Wolves"	Victor Ennis (supervising sound editor), Jamey Scott (sound designer/effects editor), Dawn Lunsford, Alicia Stevenson (Foley editors)	HBO Max
2020	Star Trek: Discovery	"That Hope Is You, Part 1"	Matthew E. Taylor (supervising sound editor); Harry Cohen, Tim Farrell (sound designers); Michael Schapiro (sound effects editors); Darrin Mann, Clay Webber (Foley editors); Alyson Dee Moore, Chris Moriana (Foley artists)	CBS All Access
2020	Westworld	"The Mother of Exiles"	Sue Gamsaragan Cahill (supervising sound editor); Benjamin Cook (sound designer), Shaughnessy Hare (sound effects editor), Brendan Croxon (Foley editor),, Adrian Medhurst (Foley artist)	HBO
2021	Outstanding Achievement in Sound Editing – Series 1 Hour – Comedy or Drama – Sound Effects and Foley			
2021	The Witcher	"A Grain of Truth"	Matthew Collinge (supervising sound editor); Rob Prynne, Alyn Sclosa, Rob Turner (sound designers); Adam Oakley, Rob Weatherall (Foley editors); Zoe Freed, Rebecca Heathcote (Foley artists)	Netflix
2021	Foundation	"The Emperor's Peace"	Tyler Whitham (sound designer); Paul Germann, Dave Rose (sound effects editors); Steve Baine (Foley artist)	Apple TV+
2021	Ted Lasso	"Beard's Night Out"	Brent Findley (supervising sound editor); Mark Cleary, Kip Smedley (sound effects editors); Jordan McClain, Arno Stephanian (Foley editors); Sanaa Kelley, Matt Salib (Foley artists)	Apple TV+
2021	The Handmaid's Tale	"Chicago"	David McCallum, Jane Tattersall (supervising sound editors); Brennan Mercer (sound effects editor); Davi Aquino, David Caporale (Foley editor); Sandra Fox (Foley artists)	Hulu
2021	Wu-Tang: An American Saga	"Protect Ya Neck"	Thomas E. de Gorter (supervising sound editor); Michael O'Conner (sound designer); Alex Jongbloed, Geordy Sincavage (Foley editors); Tara Blume, Monique Reymond (Foley artists)	Hulu
2021	Lost in Space	"Trust"	Branden Spencer (supervising sound editor); Benjamin Cook (sound designer); Brandon Croxon, Mark Hailstone, Mark Hailstone (sound effects editors); Paul Pirola (Foley artist)	Netflix
2021	Squid Game	"VIPS"	Hye-Young Kang (supervising sound editor), Ye-Jin Jo (sound designer), Hye-Jin Yang (sound effects editor); Taek-Hyun Hong (Foley editor), Chung-Gyu Lee (Foley artist)	Netflix
2021	Star Trek: Discovery	"Kobayashi Maru"	Michael Shapiro, Matthew E. Taylor (supervising sound editors); Harry Cohen, Katie Halliday (sound designers); Andrew Twite (sound effects editor); Clay Webber (Foley editor); Alyson Dee Moore, Chris Moriana (Foley artists)	Paramount+
2022	Outstanding Achievement in Sound Editing – Broadcast Long Form Effects and Foley			
2022	Stranger Things	"Chapter Seven: The Massacre at Hawkins Lab"	William Files, Craig Henighan (supervising sound editors); Angelo Palazzo, Ken McGill, Katie Halliday, Lee Gilmore, David Grimaldi, Chris Bonis (sound editors); Steve Baine (Foley artist)	Netflix
2022	Andor	"Reckoning"	David Acord, Margit Pfeiffer (supervising sound editors); David Acord (sound designer); J.R. Grubbs (sound effects editor); Shaun Farley (Foley editor); John Roesch, Shelley Roden (Foley artists)	Disney+
2022	Better Call Saul	"Carrot and Stick"	Nick Forshager, Kathryn Madsen (supervising sound editor); Matt Temple, Marc Glassman (sound effects editor); Gregg Barbanell, Alex Ullrich (Foley artists)	AMC
2022	Gaslit		Kevin W. Buchholz, Stefani Feldman (co-supervising sound editors); Dan Kremer, Adam Parrish (sound effects editor); Sam Munoz, Jordan Aldinger (Foley editors); Jacob McNaughton, Noel Vought (Foley artists)	Starz
2022	The Lord of the Rings: The Rings of Power	"Udûn"	Damian Del Borrello, Robby Stambler (supervising sound editors); Paula Fairfield (sound designer); James Miller, Chris Terhune, Gareth Van Niekerk, Ryan A. Sullivan, Goeun Everett (sound editors); Richard Wills, Jonathan Bruce, Amy Barber (Foley editor); Jonathan Bruce (Foley artist)	Prime Video

== Programs with multiple nominations ==
3 nominations

- Battlestar Galactica (Sci Fi)
- Westworld (HBO)

2 nominations

- Black Mirror (Netflix)
- CSI: Crime Scene Investigation (CBS)
- Game of Thrones (HBO)
- Homeland (Showtime)
- Ozark (Netflix)
- Star Trek: Discovery (CBS All Access/Paramount+)
- True Detective (HBO)
- The Walking Dead (AMC)
