= Hobgoblins 2 =

- Directed by: Rick Sloane
- Written by: Rick Sloane
- Produced by: Rick Sloane
- Starring: Josh Mills; Sabrina Bolin; Jason Buuck; Jordana Berliner; Josh Green; Chanel Ryan
- Cinematography: Matt Berger
- Music by: Alan DerMarderosian
- Distributed by: Shout! Factory
- Release date: June 23, 2009
- Running time: 92 minutes
- Country: United States
- Language: English

Hobgoblins 2 is a 2009 direct-to-DVD sequel to the 1988 science-fiction film, Hobgoblins. Written and directed by Rick Sloane, the film was released on DVD by Shout! Factory on June 23, 2009. The sequel was made to look identical to the original film, and utilized 35mm film and composite effects, look-alike actors, some of the original costumes and the same puppets.

== Plot ==
The film takes place after the original film, where McCreedy has been locked in a psychiatric hospital after blowing up the film studio to destroy the Hobgoblins, which occurred at the end of the first film. Kevin and his friends are now in college, and their Professor introduces them to McCreedy, who warns them that it is still possible to be attacked by Hobgoblins. Despite McCreedy's warning, Kevin and his friends re-encounter the Hobgoblins and must fight against them and their own greatest fears, in order to save their lives.

== Cast ==
- Josh Mills as Kevin
- Chanel Ryan as Fantazia
- Sabrina Bolin as Amy
- Jason Buuck as Nick
- Josh Green as Kyle
- Jordana Berliner as Daphne
- Ashley Ausburn as Buffy
- Joy Villa as Candy Striper

== Development ==
Made on a low budget, the film embraces this with its use of in-jokes and poor special effects used for comedic effect, just like the original. The characters still dress in typical clothes from the 1980s. Hobgoblins 2 also delivers even more stock shots of explosions and car crashes than the original.

A DVD bonus feature, "Hobgoblins 2, What Were They Thinking?", features the original Hobgoblins cast critiquing the new actors who re-created their roles. Director Rick Sloane discusses how this film was originally planned to go into production two years after the original, and instead, 20 years later, it was shot using the same script. Nonetheless, the film does include occasional sly references to the Mystery Science Theater 3000 episode, in which the original film was spoofed (after it was submitted to the MST3K team by Sloane himself) – in particular, the theme song for Hobgoblins 2 is based on a song that Mike and the Bots sing in the MST3K episode.
