= Tales of Mystery and Imagination (film) =

2009 film by Geoff Murphy

- Directed by: Geoff Murphy
- Produced by: Anthony Donaldson; Lucien Johnson
- Starring: Patrick Bleakley; Anthony Donaldson; Lucien Johnson
- Narrated by: Chris Palmer
- Music by: Lucien Johnson
- Production company: Howard Taylor Productions
- Release date: 2009
- Running time: 75 minutes
- Country: New Zealand
- Language: English

Tales of Mystery and Imagination is a 2009 New Zealand film directed by Geoff Murphy.

== Synopsis ==
A mixture of music CGI graphics and quotes inspired by Tales of Mystery & Imagination by Edgar Allan Poe.

== Credits ==
- Matt Aickin - Sound
- Patrick Bleakley - Performer
- Phil Burchell - Camera
- Anthony Donaldson - Producer, Performer
- Lucien Johnson - Producer, Composer, Sound, Performer
- Hepi Mita - Camera
- Miles Murphy - Camera Operator
- Geoff Murphy - Director, Camera
- Paul Murphy - Camera
- Gaylene Preston - Camera
- Howard Taylor - Co-Producer

== Reviews ==
2009 New Zealand International Film Festival
