= City of Industry (film) =

- Theatrical release poster
- Directed by: John Irvin
- Screenplay by: Ken Solarz
- Produced by: Evzen Kolar; Ken Solarz
- Starring: Harvey Keitel; Stephen Dorff; Timothy Hutton; Famke Janssen; Wade Dominguez
- Cinematography: Thomas Burstyn
- Edited by: Mark Conte
- Music by: Stephen Endelman
- Production company: Largo Entertainment
- Distributed by: Orion Pictures
- Release date: March 14, 1997 (United States)
- Running time: 97 minutes
- Country: United States
- Language: English
- Budget: $8 million
- Box office: $1,568,328

City of Industry is a 1997 American neo-noir crime thriller film starring Harvey Keitel, Stephen Dorff and Timothy Hutton. It is directed by John Irvin, produced by Evzen Kolar and Ken Solarz and written by Solarz.

== Plot ==
Retired thief, Roy Egan (Harvey Keitel), comes out of retirement to help his youngest brother, Lee (Timothy Hutton), with a jewelry heist in Palm Springs. Along for the ride are hired muscle, Jorge Montana (Wade Dominguez), and wheelman, Skip Kovich (Stephen Dorff). The heist goes down the next day and, thanks to Jorge's scrambling of the police monitors and traffic signals, their getaway is successful.

In Skip's motel room, his girlfriend, Gena (Dana Barron), voices how little money he will be receiving from the heist. At the trailer park Lee and Jorge are having some beers and talking about how much each will make, when Skip suddenly shoots them. Roy, who was in the bathroom, hears the gunshots, slams the door on Skip, and runs for it. Roy steals a car and heads to Los Angeles where he rents a room and starts plotting. He stops at Lee's house along the way to inform his wife, Sunny (Tamara Clatterbuck), about her husband's death and to ask if she knows Skip's whereabouts. Skip employs Odell and his crew as protection against Roy, and proceeds to deal with his debt to loan shark Harvey (Elliott Gould). Harvey is connected with the Chinese mob and Skip convinces Harvey to use his connections to track down Roy, in exchange for more money on top of what he already owes him.

Roy goes to Jorge's home and asks his widow, Rachel (Famke Jansen), if she knows Skip. He then informs her that Skip killed Jorge. Rachel angrily dismisses him. At his motel, Roy is found by two members of the Chinese mob and kidnapped but he frees himself, killing his captors in the process.

The next morning, Rachel finds a bruised and bloody Roy lying in her yard. She cleans him up and Roy offers her $5,000 to take care of him. Once he recovers, Rachel asks for $100,000 instead. Roy refuses at first, but when she gives him Jorge's address book full of contacts – including Skip – he accepts. Rachel also tells Roy where the Chinese mob launders cash and gives him a Saint Christopher medal for protection. Roy attacks the man in charge, Uncle Luke (François Chau), and takes Skip's money, but unknowingly leaves his motel key behind. Uncle Luke tells Skip about the key Roy left behind. Chinese mobsters later attempt to kill Roy in his motel room, but Roy is waiting for them.

Skip kidnaps Rachel. He goes to a trailer where his girlfriend Gena finds that Odell has sent two of his guys to get the money Skip owes them. They take Gena hostage and Skip kills them both, purposefully killing Gena in the process. Skip and Roy plan to meet at a refinery and when Roy arrives, he gets into a gun fight with the mob who are after Skip. Roy takes them out, but is severely wounded, although still able to beat Skip to death with his bare hands. He rescues Rachel who speeds a barely conscious Roy to a hospital. When she returns, both Roy and her car are gone, but he has left her money in a duffel bag. Rachel and her children bury Jorge and relocate to Port Arthur, Texas. One day, the postman delivers a small package to her. She opens it and finds the religious medal she gave Roy, assuring her that he's alive.

== Cast ==
- Harvey Keitel as Roy Egan
- Timothy Hutton as Lee Egan
- Stephen Dorff as Skip Kovich
- Famke Janssen as Rachel Montana
- Wade Dominguez as Jorge Montana
- Michael Jai White as Odell Williams
- Lucy Liu as Cathi Rose
- François Chau as Luke "Uncle Luke"
- Dana Barron as Gena
- Elliott Gould as Harvey
- Tamara Clatterbuck as Sunny Egan

== Reception ==
On the review aggregator website Rotten Tomatoes, 43% of 14 critics' reviews are positive.
