= Race Against Time (film) =

2000 Canadian drama film

- Directed by: Geoff Murphy
- Written by: Cary Solomon; Chuck Konzelman
- Produced by: Steven Felder
- Starring: Eric Roberts; Cary Elwes; Sarah Wynter
- Cinematography: Thomas Burstyn
- Edited by: Rick Shaine
- Music by: Don Davis
- Production companies: Motion International; Rosemont Productions International
- Release date: 2000
- Running time: 90 minutes
- Countries: United States; Canada
- Language: English

Race Against Time is a 2000 Canadian-American film directed by Geoff Murphy. It received an Emmy Award nomination for special effects.

== Synopsis ==
A man enters into an agreement to sell his body for organ transplants to pay for surmounting bills for his dying son's hospital stay. When advised that the doctors want to immediately claim his organs, he goes on the run.

== Cast ==
- Eric Roberts as James Gabriel
- Cary Elwes as Burke
- Sarah Wynter as Alex
- Chris Sarandon as Dr. Anton Stofeles
- Diane Venora as Dr. Helen Steele
- Michael Greyeyes as Johnny Black Eagle
- Terry Simpson as Janovsky
- Joel McNichol as Mike Cherry
- Danny Mags as Bobby Gabriel
- Robin Wilcock as Dr. Elliot
- Cas Anvar as Dr. Bergen
- Karen Cliche as Irina
- Corey Sosner as Security Guard #1
- Steve Adams as Mr. Strathmore
- James Bradford as Judge
- Russell Yuen as Runner
- Calvin Green as Technician
- Brian D. Wright as Cabbie
- Sarah Edmondson as Alma Cherry
- Genevieve Farrell as Little Girl
- Greg Kramer as Male Nurse
- Richard Zeman as Team Leader / Captain
- Jason Cavalier as Tracker
- Gilbert Larose Jr. as Tracker
- Allan Yuk-lun Chou as Tracker
- Mike Chute as Tracker
- Jean Frenette as Tracker
- Stéphane Lefebvre as Tracker
- Sean Devine as Kilroy the Bounty Hunter
- Flint Eagle as Dead Fred
- Donny Falsetti as Lab Technician
- Peggy Flood as Secretary

== Awards ==
- 2001 nominated Primetime Emmy Award for Outstanding Special Visual Effects
- 2000 nominated Motion Picture Sound Editors Golden Reel Awards Golden Reel Award for Outstanding Achievement in Sound Editing – Series 1 Hour – Effects / Foley
