= Suburban Gothic =

Subgenre of Gothic fiction, art, film and television

Suburban Gothic is a subgenre of Gothic fiction, art, film and television, focused on anxieties associated with the creation of suburban communities, particularly in the United States and the Western world, from the 1950s and 1960s onwards.

== Criteria ==
It often, but not exclusively, relies on the supernatural or elements of science fiction that have been in wider Gothic literature, but manifested in a suburban setting. It also more often than not reflects a societal issue or anxiety with suburban life through the depiction of the supernatural force. It also tends to have a human threat, though in some cases more traditional monsters are used.

== Description ==
Suburban Gothic is defined by Bernice M. Murphy as "a subgenre of the wider American Gothic tradition which dramatises anxieties arising from the mass urbanisation of the United States and usually features suburban settings, preoccupations and protagonists". She argues that a common trope of the suburban Gothic is the danger within a family or neighbourhood, rather than an external threat. Teenagers and children are often major protagonists or sources of threat, and characteristic conflicts often focus on issues of individuality and conformity.

== Literature ==
Important early works identified with the subgenre include Henry Bellamann’s Kings Row Richard Matheson's I Am Legend (1954), Grace Metalious’s Peyton Place, Shirley Jackson's The Haunting of Hill House (1959) and The Road Through the Wall (1948). More recent books identified within the genre are Bret Easton Ellis' mock memoir Lunar Park (2005), R.L. Stine's Fear Street series (1989) and Goosebumps series (1992) Jeffrey Eugenides' The Virgin Suicides (1993), Suzanne Berne's A Crime in the Neighborhood (1997), and Tom Perrotta's Little Children (2004).

== Film ==
Important films include Stanley Kubrick's take on Lolita (1962), Wes Craven's original A Nightmare on Elm Street (1984) and Tobe Hooper's Poltergeist (1982). Works that incorporate environmental concerns include Ira Levin's The Stepford Wives (1975), Anne Rivers Siddons's The House Next Door (1978), Todd Haynes's Safe (1995) and David Lynch's Blue Velvet (1986) have been identified as part of the suburban gothic subgenre. An earlier cinematic example of this is Nicholas Ray's 1955 classic Rebel Without a Cause. Films with threats from a female protagonist, including Fatal Attraction (1987) and Disclosure (1994), have also been identified as part of the genre. In addition, films that feature a more character-driven or dramatic standpoint also inform the genre, notably Peter Jackson's Heavenly Creatures (1994), Todd Solondz's Happiness (1998), Sam Mendes's American Beauty (1999), and Richard Kelly's Donnie Darko (2001). Other films described as within the suburban gothic genre include Brian De Palma's version of Stephen King's Carrie (1976), John Carpenter's Halloween (1978), The Amityville Horror (1979), Fright Night (1985), The Stepfather (1987), Joe Dante's The 'Burbs (1989), Parents (1989), Tim Burton's Edward Scissorhands (1990), The People Under the Stairs (1991; also by Wes Craven), John Waters's Serial Mom (1994), Peter Weir's Truman Show (1998), Little Children (2006), The Girl Next Door (2007), The Sisterhood of Night (2014), I Saw the TV Glow (2024), The Invitation (2015), Snowtown (2011) Invasion of the Body Snatchers (1956), The Virgin Suicides (2000), The Babadook (2014), and The Lovely Bones (2009).

== Television ==
Peyton Place was one of the earliest examples of the genre and inspired both Secrets of Midland Heights and King’s Crossing. The works of David Lynch are also seen as defining examples of the genre, notably the television series Twin Peaks, alongside the 1992 feature Fire Walk with Me. The direct to TV film Are You in the House Alone also belongs to this genre, diving into sexual dangers of the suburbs. TV series such as Buffy the Vampire Slayer, Supernatural, The Addams Family, The Munsters, Desperate Housewives, and Weeds have also been seen as dealing with concerns about hidden Gothic worlds behind the suburban façade. The cult program Dark Shadows also gives an interesting spin on the genre. Another televised example is the Emmy-winning American Horror Story.

== Radio ==
The genre also is present in radio, with some examples being The Witch's Tale, Quiet Please, I Love a Mystery, Inner Sanctum, and Escape. Other examples include programs such as Lights Out and Suspense. These programs all dealt with the ways in which elements of the Gothic find their way into the home and family, which is showcased in the personal nature of radio as a medium.

== See also ==
- American Gothic Fiction
- Dark Romanticism
- Southern Gothic
- Tasmanian Gothic
- Urban Gothic
- Social thriller
- The Monsters Are Due on Maple Street-1960 episode of The Twilight Zone featuring commentary on McCarthyism
- Pulp noir
