= Shadow of Doubt (1998 film) =

- Directed by: Randal Kleiser
- Written by: Myra Byanka; Raymond De Felitta
- Produced by: Adam Kline; Douglas Curtis; Frank K. Isaac
- Starring: Melanie Griffith; Tom Berenger; Craig Sheffer; Huey Lewis
- Cinematography: Craig Haagensen
- Edited by: Jeff Gourson
- Music by: Joel Goldsmith
- Production company: Largo Entertainment
- Distributed by: New City Releasing (Theatrical); Columbia TriStar Home Video (VHS/DVD)
- Release date: April 9, 1998
- Running time: 103 minutes
- Country: United States
- Language: English

Shadow of Doubt is a 1998 American independent crime-mystery thriller and courtroom drama film directed by Randal Kleiser, and starring Melanie Griffith, Tom Berenger, Craig Sheffer, and Huey Lewis.

== Cast ==
- Melanie Griffith as Kit Devereaux
- Tom Berenger as Jack Campioni
- Craig Sheffer as Laird Atkins
- Huey Lewis as Al Gordon
- Wade Dominguez as Bobby Medina
- James Morrison as Paul Saxon
- Nina Foch as Sylvia Saxon
- Tony Plana as Detective Krause
- Richard Portnow as Marvin Helm
- Forbes Riley as Female Reporter
- John Ritter as Steven Mayer
- Tia Texada as Conchita Perez
- Tracy Douglas as Anchor

== See also ==
- List of American films of 1998
