= Taxman (film) =

- Film poster
- Directed by: Avi Nesher
- Written by: Avi Nesher; Roger Berger
- Produced by: Avi Nesher; Kathy Jordan
- Starring: Joe Pantoliano; Wade Dominguez; Elizabeth Berkley; Robert Townsend; Michael Chiklis; Mike Starr; Fisher Stevens
- Cinematography: Jim Denault
- Edited by: Alex Hall
- Music by: Roger Neill
- Release date: 1998
- Running time: 104 minutes
- Country: United States
- Languages: English; Russian

Taxman is a 1998 American crime drama film directed by Avi Nesher and written by Nesher and Roger Berger.

== Plot ==
A tax investigator chasing a tax evader stumbles upon a series of bloody murders and gets wrapped up in an investigation with a rookie cop despite his boss's orders to stay out of the way.

== Cast ==
- Joe Pantoliano as Al Benjamin
- Wade Dominguez as Joseph Romero
- Elizabeth Berkley as Nadia Rubikov
- Robert Townsend as Peyton Cody
- Michael Chiklis as Andre Rubakov
- Mike Starr as Mike Neals
- Fisher Stevens as Kenneth Green

== Home media ==
Flashback Entertainment released a transfer of the film in Australia as a three-DVD package "Thriller" (cat. 7360) with Brand New World (titled "Woundings") and Terminal Error.
