= Wade Dominguez =

American actor (1966–1998)

- Born: May 10, 1966
- Died: August 26, 1998 (aged 32)
- Occupations: Actor; model; singer; dancer
- Years active: 1994–1998
- Height: 5 ft 8 in (1.74 m)

Wade Dominguez (May 10, 1966 – August 26, 1998) was an American actor, model, singer, and dancer best known for his portrayal as Emilio Ramírez in Dangerous Minds.

== Death ==
On August 26, 1998, Dominguez died at the age of 32 of AIDS-related respiratory failure. Actress Elizabeth Berkley visited Dominguez in his hospital bed and showed him a rough cut of his last film, Taxman. He then broke down crying, saying "I'm so good, I'm so good." Dominguez died before the release of the film, which is dedicated to him.

== Filmography ==
Year	Title	Role	Notes
1994	Erotique	Dream sequence lover	(segment: "Let's Talk About Love")
1995	Dangerous Minds	Emilio Ramírez	
1997	City of Industry	Jorge Montana	
1998	Shadow of Doubt	Bobby Medina	
1998	Taxman	Joseph Romero	Posthumous release
