= Southern Gothic =

Subgenre of Gothic fiction

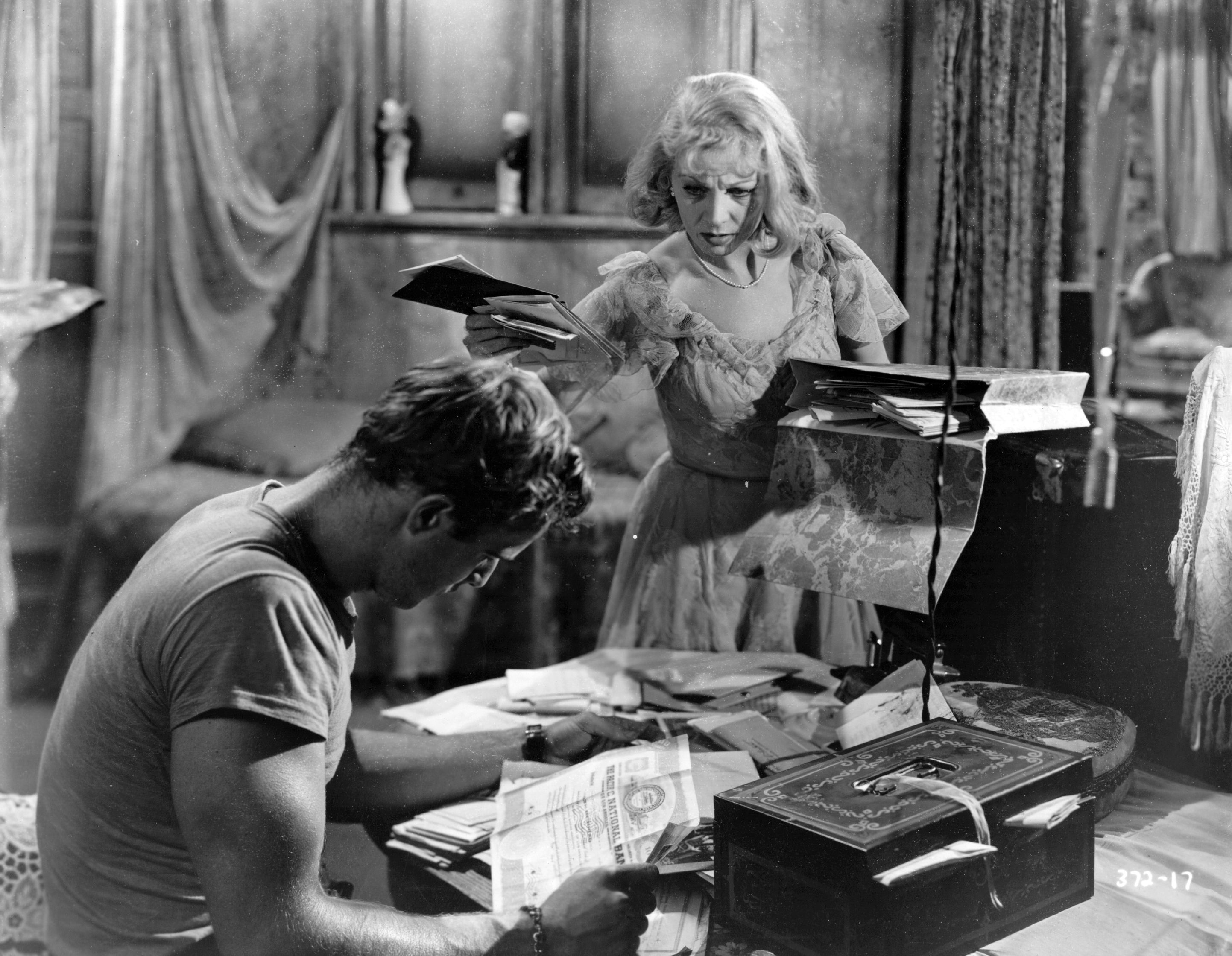
Marlon Brando and Vivien Leigh in A Streetcar Named Desire (1951).

Southern Gothic is an artistic subgenre of fiction, music, film, theatre, and television that is heavily influenced by Gothic elements and set in the American South. Southern Gothic fiction highlights violence and cruelty as features of Southern culture, often through characters whose place in the social order exposes them to such treatment. Common motifs include racism, gender and sexual difference, poverty, and disability. Where Gothic literature depicted the intrusion of the barbaric past into the Enlightenment, Southern Gothic depicts the persistence of social trauma in the reconstructed South. The genre arose partly in reaction to romantic portrayals influenced by Lost Cause myths and the ideology of American exceptionalism.

== History ==
Elements of a Gothic treatment of the South first appeared during the ante- and post-bellum 19th century in the grotesques of Henry Clay Lewis and in the sardonic representations of Mark Twain. The genre consolidated, however, in the 20th century, when dark romanticism, Southern humor, and the new literary naturalism merged in a new and powerful form of social critique. The themes of the Southern Gothic genre serve to dismantle the romantic mythology surrounding the Antebellum South while commenting on the region's oft-suppressed dark history. Like the original artistic term "Gothic", the term "Southern Gothic" was at first pejorative and dismissive. In 1935, Ellen Glasgow critiqued the writings of Erskine Caldwell, William Faulkner, and the "Southern Gothic School", stating that their work was filled with "aimless violence" and "fantastic nightmares". The connotation was at first so negative that Eudora Welty said: "They better not call me that!"

The images of Great Depression photographer Walker Evans are seen to evoke the visual depiction of the Southern Gothic; Evans claimed: "I can understand why Southerners are haunted by their own landscape". Another noted Southern Gothic photographer was surrealist Clarence John Laughlin, who photographed cemeteries, plantations, and other abandoned places throughout the American South (primarily Louisiana) for nearly 40 years. A resurgence of Southern Gothic themes in contemporary fiction has been identified in the work of figures like Barry Hannah, Joe R. Lansdale, Helen Ellis, and Cherie Priest.

== Characteristics ==
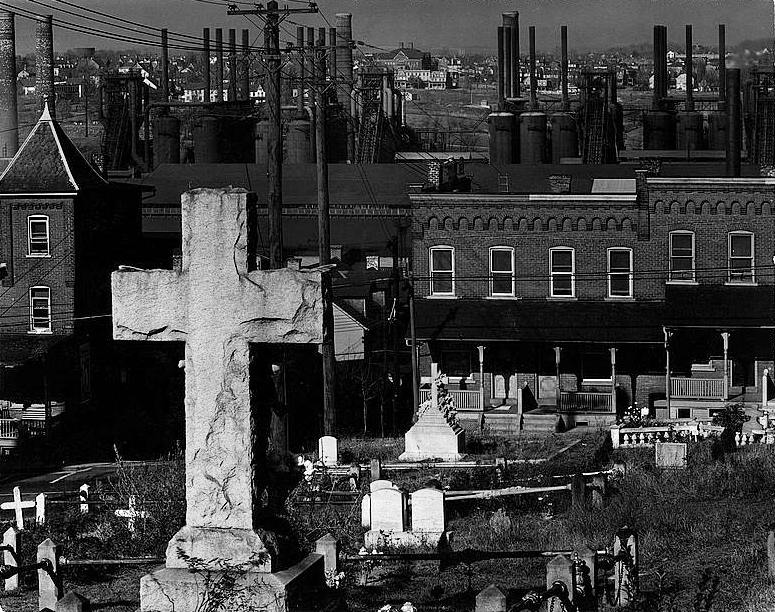
The Great Depression photography of Walker Evans has been described as Southern Gothic.

The setting of these works is distinctly Southern. Southern Gothic media frequently explores themes of madness, decay and despair, continuing pressures of the past upon the present, particularly with the lost ideals of a dispossessed Southern aristocracy and continued racial hostilities. Southern Gothic particularly focuses on the South's history of slavery, racism, fear of the outside world, and violence, with a "fixation with the grotesque, and a tension between realistic and supernatural elements".

Southern Gothic often depicts fears of the past haunting the present through the lasting impacts of institutions such as slavery, racism, war, and widespread poverty in the region. It also often contains themes involving the deep religious roots of Southern culture as well as folk magic such as hoodoo and visual motifs involving old or abandoned places such as derelict houses, old cemeteries, and overgrown swamplands.

Similar to the elements of the Gothic castle, Southern Gothic depicts the decay of the plantation in the post-Civil War South. Villains who disguise themselves as innocents or victims are often found in Southern Gothic literature, especially stories by Flannery O'Connor, such as "Good Country People" and "The Life You Save May Be Your Own", giving the reader a blurred line between victim and villain.

== Southern Gothic media ==
A number of films, television programs, and other works are also described as being part of the Southern Gothic genre. Some prominent examples are:

=== Films ===
- Sparrows (1926)
- The Story of Temple Drake (1933)
- Swamp Water (1941)
- Tobacco Road (1941)
- Intruder in the Dust (1949)
- A Streetcar Named Desire (1951)
- The Night of the Hunter (1955)
- Baby Doll (1956)
- Written on the Wind (1956)
- Cat on a Hot Tin Roof (1958)
- The Long, Hot Summer (1958)
- Thunder Road (1958)
- Suddenly, Last Summer (1959)
- The Fugitive Kind (1960)
- The Young One (1960)
- Angel Baby (1961)
- Claudelle Inglish (1961)
- To Kill a Mockingbird (1962)
- Hush...Hush, Sweet Charlotte (1964)
- Baby the Rain Must Fall (1965)
- The Fool Killer (1965)
- Mudhoney (1965)
- This Property Is Condemned (1966)
- Hurry Sundown (1967)
- In the Heat of the Night (1967)
- Reflections in a Golden Eye (1967)
- The Heart Is a Lonely Hunter (1968)
- Last of the Mobile Hot Shots (1970)
- The Beguiled (1971)
- Deliverance (1972)
- Tomorrow (1972)
- Lemora (1973)
- Lolly-Madonna XXX (1973)
- Macon County Line (1974)
- The Evictors (1979)
- The Texas Chain Saw Massacre (1974)
- Wise Blood (1979)
- The Beyond (1981)
- Dark Night of the Scarecrow (1981)
- Southern Comfort (1981)
- Cat People (1982)
- Swamp Thing (1982)
- The River Rat (1984)
- Crimes of the Heart (1986)
- Angel Heart (1987)
- Sister, Sister (1987)
- Pumpkinhead (1988)
- Chattahoochee (1989)
- Miss Firecracker (1989)
- Blood Salvage (1990)
- Edward Scissorhands (1990)
- Wild at Heart (1990)
- The Reflecting Skin (1990)
- The Ballad of the Sad Café (1991)
- Fried Green Tomatoes (1991)
- One False Move (1992)
- Storyville (1992)
- The Turning (1992)
- Flesh and Bone (1993)
- Interview with the Vampire (1994)
- The Client (1994)
- Heaven's Prisoners (1995)
- A Family Thing (1996)
- A Time to Kill (1996)
- Sling Blade (1996)
- 100 Proof (1997)
- The Apostle (1997)
- Lawn Dogs (1997)
- Eve's Bayou (1997)
- Midnight in the Garden of Good and Evil (1997)
- Traveller (1997)
- Home Fries (1998)
- Cookie's Fortune (1999)
- George Washington (2000)
- O Brother, Where Art Thou? (2000)
- The Gift (2000)
- Red Dirt (2000)
- Daddy and Them (2001)
- Frailty (2001)
- Monster's Ball (2001)
- The Accountant (2001)
- Big Fish (2003)
- A Love Song for Bobby Long (2004)
- Chrystal (2004)
- The Heart Is Deceitful Above All Things (2004)
- The Ladykillers (2004)
- Undertow (2004)
- The King (2005)
- Junebug (2005)
- Tideland (2005)
- The Skeleton Key (2005)
- Black Snake Moan (2007)
- The Reaping (2007)
- Shotgun Stories (2007)
- Ballast (2008)
- The Secret Life of Bees (2008)
- Get Low (2009)
- That Evening Sun (2009)
- The Killer Inside Me (2010)
- Winter's Bone (2010)
- Bernie (2011)
- Killer Joe (2011)
- Straw Dogs (2011)
- Beasts of the Southern Wild (2012)
- Jayne Mansfield's Car (2012)
- Lawless (2012)
- Mud (2012)
- The Paperboy (2012)
- Blue Ruin (2013)
- Jug Face (2013)
- Beautiful Creatures (2013)
- Joe (2013)
- Stoker (2013)
- Cold in July (2014)
- Jessabelle (2014)
- Little Accidents (2014)
- Two Step (2014)
- Midnight Special (2016)
- Nocturnal Animals (2016)
- The Beguiled (2017)
- Three Billboards Outside Ebbing, Missouri (2017)
- Mudbound (2017)
- The Peanut Butter Falcon (2019)
- The Dark and the Wicked (2020)
- The Devil All the Time (2020)
- The Quarry (2020)
- What Josiah Saw (2021)
- Bones and All (2022)
- Where the Crawdads Sing (2022)
- Devil's Peak (2023)
- Appalachian Dog (2025)
- Carolina Caroline (2025)
- Sinners (2025)
- Violent Ends (2025)
- Is God Is (2026)

=== Television series ===
- True Blood (2008–2014)
- Justified (2010–2015)
- Rectify (2013–2016)
- True Detective, seasons 1 (2014) and 3 (2019)
- Outcast (2016–2018)
- Preacher (2016–2019)
- Sharp Objects (2018)
- Lovecraft Country (2020)
- Interview with the Vampire (2022–2026)

=== Video games ===
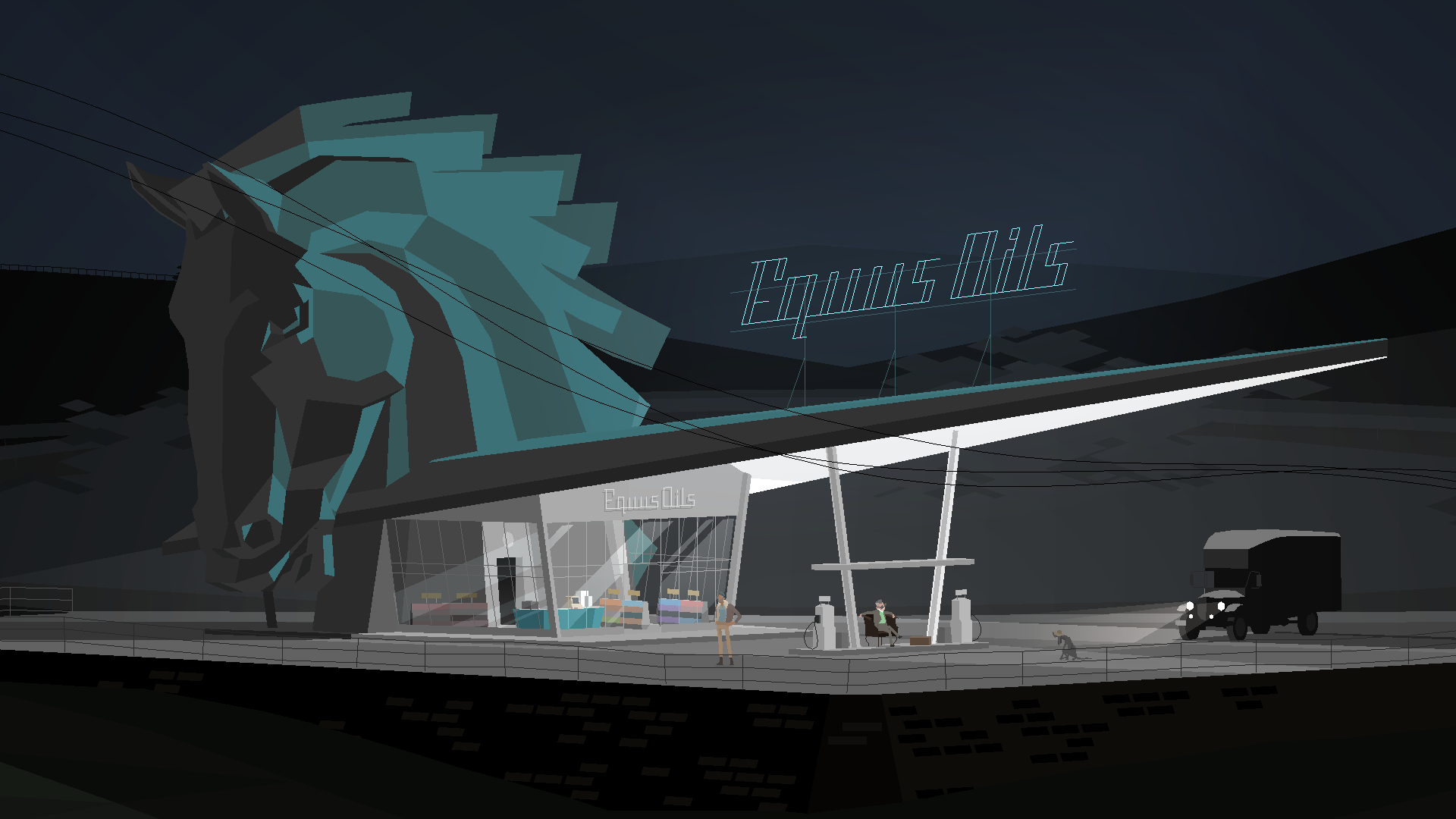
A screenshot of Kentucky Route Zero showcasing the Southern Gothic setting

- The Colonel's Bequest (1989)
- Alone in the Dark (1992)
- Call of Juarez (2006)
- Left 4 Dead 2 (2009)
- The Walking Dead (2012)
- Mafia III (2016)
- Outlast 2 (2017)
- Resident Evil 7: Biohazard (2017)
- Blair Witch (2019)
- Hunt: Showdown (2019)
- Kentucky Route Zero (2020)
- Scarlet Hollow (2021)
- Evil Dead: The Game (2022)
- Norco (2022)
- The Texas Chain Saw Massacre (2023)
- South of Midnight (2025)

=== Music ===
Southern Gothic (also known as Gothic Americana, or Dark Country) is a genre of American music rooted in early jazz, gospel, Americana, gothic rock and post-punk. Its lyrics often focus on dark subject matter. The genre shares thematic connections with the Southern Gothic genre of literature, and indeed the parameters of what makes something Gothic Americana appears to have more in common with literary genres than traditional musical ones. Songs often examine poverty, criminal behavior, religious imagery, death, ghosts, family, lost love, alcohol, murder, the devil, and betrayal.

Flannery O'Connor's writings influenced the creation of Bruce Springsteen's Nebraska (1982). Athens, Georgia–based alternative rock band R.E.M. displayed a Southern Gothic influence with their third album, Fables of the Reconstruction (1985). J.D. Wilkes, frontman of the band Legendary Shack Shakers, described Southern Gothic music as "[taking] an angle that there's something grotesque and beautiful in the traditions of the South, the backdrop of Southern living." Johnny Cash's American Recordings series, produced by Rick Rubin, a producer best known for working with hip-hop and heavy metal artists, was described as having a gothic country sound and image. Amidst covers of songs by non-country artists such as Depeche Mode, Danzig and Nine Inch Nails, as well as traditional and World War II-era songs, Cash's album series lyrically derived from haunting, despaired themes such as death, and recurring religious themes in the form of dark gospel recordings. Ethel Cain's music has been described as "Southern Gothic Pop."

== See also ==
- African-American literature
- American Gothic fiction
- Southern noir
- Dark romanticism
- Ghost story
- Gothic Western
- Magic realism
- Southern literature
- Southern Renaissance
- Southern Ontario Gothic
- Space Gothic
- Suburban Gothic
- Tasmanian Gothic
- Urban Gothic
- Weird West
