= Blind Side (1993 film) =

- Genre: Thriller
- Written by: Stewart Lindh; Solomon Weingarten; John Carlen
- Directed by: Geoff Murphy
- Starring: Rebecca De Mornay; Rutger Hauer; Ron Silver
- Music by: Brian May
- Country of origin: United States
- Original language: English

Production
- Executive producers: Jeffrey Lurie; John Bard Manulis; John Marsh
- Producer: Jay Roewe
- Production locations: Los Angeles; Puerto Vallarta, Jalisco, Mexico
- Cinematography: Paul Elliott
- Editor: Rick Shaine
- Running time: 98 minutes
- Production companies: Chestnut Hill Productions; HBO Pictures

Original release
- Network: HBO
- Release: January 30, 1993

Blind Side is an HBO made for television movie starring Rutger Hauer, Rebecca De Mornay, and Ron Silver, directed by New Zealander Geoff Murphy. Written by Stewart Lindh, Solomon Weingarten, and John Carlen. Story by Stewart Lindh and Solomon Weingarten. Filmed in 1992, the thriller debuted on HBO in January 1993, then it aired later on NBC in April 1993. It was released theatrically in a number of European countries, including France, Italy and Sweden.

== Plot ==
Married couple Lynn and Doug Kaines (De Mornay and Silver), owners of an exotic furniture design company, visit Mexico, while Lynn is in the first term of her pregnancy. On their nighttime return trip, with her at the wheel, they accidentally run into and kill a Mexican police officer in the middle of the road. They make no report of the accident, wary of the perils of a Mexican jail, but slide the dead cop to the side of the road and return to the United States. They have the front end damage to their car repaired clandestinely and appear to have gotten away with the killing.

Quite unexpectedly a vagabond named Jake Shell (Hauer), driving a dumpy old camper truck, shows up at their door hinting that he witnessed the entire incident. Shell blackmails the Kaines, who attempt to appease him. There is a physical confrontation with Shell and the Kaineses, along with perverse sexual innuendo, and an attempt by the Kaines to rid themselves of their nemesis without revealing their scary secret.

== Cast ==
- Rutger Hauer as Jake Shell
- Rebecca De Mornay as Lynn Kaines
- Ron Silver as Doug Kaines
- Jonathan Banks as Aaron
- Mariska Hargitay as Melanie
- Tamara Clatterbuck as Barbara Hall

== Production ==
The movie was shot in three major locations. The main story of the movie was shot over a three-week period in Altadena, California. The furniture factory showroom used the historic power substation of the Pacific Electric Railway's Mount Lowe line. The building was unoccupied and served well for the set. The residential shoot was done at an old mansion at the corner of New York Drive and Mar Vista Street. The house was up for sale and had been vacant for fourteen months.

The opening scene in Mexico was shot last in Cabo San Lucas after the American location shoots. The accident scene was shot over a two-week period in Agua Dulce, California, mostly with the use of the municipal airport.
