= Geoff Murphy =

New Zealand filmmaker

Geoff Murphy ONZM
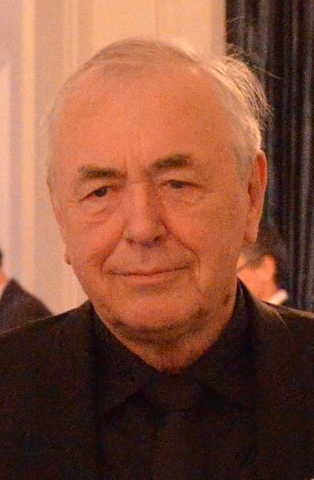
- Murphy in 2013
- Born: Geoffrey Peter Murphy; 12 October 1938; Wellington, New Zealand
- Died: 3 December 2018 (aged 80); Wellington, New Zealand
- Occupations: Film director, film producer, screenwriter
- Years active: 1977–2018
- Spouse: Merata Mita

Geoffrey Peter Murphy ONZM (12 October 1938 – 3 December 2018) was a New Zealand filmmaker, producer, director and screenwriter best known for his work during the renaissance of New Zealand cinema that began in the second half of the 1970s. His second feature Goodbye Pork Pie (1981) was the first New Zealand film to win major commercial success on its soil. Murphy directed several Hollywood features during the 1990s, before returning to New Zealand as second-unit director on The Lord of the Rings film trilogy. Murphy was also a scriptwriter, special effects technician, schoolteacher and trumpet player at different times. He was married to Merata Mita, a film director, actress, writer.

== Early life ==
Murphy grew up in the Wellington suburb of Highbury, and attended St Vincent de Paul School in Kelburn and St Patrick's College, Wellington, before training and working as a schoolteacher.

== Blerta ==
Murphy was a founding member of the hippy musical and theatrical co-operative Blerta, which toured New Zealand and Australia performing multi-media shows in the early 1970s. Blerta were later allowed to make their television series, spawning what is arguably Murphy's first feature film, the 75-minute-long Wild Man. Several Blerta members would work on Murphy's films, including drummer and Blerta founder Bruno Lawrence, who had starring roles in Utu and The Quiet Earth.

== Early films ==
Murphy made his name with road movie Goodbye Pork Pie (1981), the first New Zealand film to attract large-scale audiences in its home country. Made on a low budget, the film followed three people travelling from the top of the North Island to the bottom of the South Island, to growing infamy along the way. Murphy directed the film and co-produced it with Nigel Hutchinson. Murphy next directed the Māori Western Utu (1983) and the last-man-on-Earth piece The Quiet Earth (1985).

== Hollywood ==
By the 1990s Murphy had begun a decade working outside of New Zealand, mostly in the United States. In this period he directed films such as Young Guns II, Freejack, which featured Emilio Estevez and Mick Jagger, and Steven Seagal sequel Under Siege 2: Dark Territory. The latter proved his most successful film at the international box-office, grossing more than US$100 million worldwide.

== Return to New Zealand ==
Murphy returned to New Zealand and assisted Peter Jackson on The Lord of the Rings films; made a documentary film chronicling the Blerta phenomenon; and directed the thriller Spooked, featuring Cliff Curtis. In the later 2000s, he directed the New Zealand television comedy series Welcome to Paradise, worked on the remastered DVD release of Goodbye Pork Pie, and was 2nd-unit director on XXX: State of the Union.

In 2013 Murphy was honoured with the Lifetime Achievement Award at the 2013 Rialto Channel New Zealand Film Awards. The same year saw the release of a restored and re-edited version of possibly his film Utu, under the title Utu Redux.

Murphy was appointed an Officer of the New Zealand Order of Merit, for services to film, in the 2014 New Year Honours. In the same year, he was awarded an honorary doctorate in literature by Massey University. In his acceptance speech he said "Sir Peter Jackson has stolen the New Zealand Film industry".

Murphy died on 3 December 2018.

== Filmography ==
- 1969 Tank Busters (TV, 31 minutes)
- 1974 Uenuku (TV, 37 minutes)
- 1977 Wild Man (75 minutes)
- 1977 Dagg Day Afternoon (30 minutes)
- 1981 Goodbye Pork Pie
- 1983 Utu
- 1985 The Quiet Earth
- 1988 Never Say Die
- 1989 Red King, White Knight
- 1990 Young Guns II
- 1992 Freejack
- 1993 Blind Side (HBO)
- 1994 The Last Outlaw
- 1995 Under Siege 2: Dark Territory
- 1996 Don't Look Back
- 1997 The Magnificent Seven – TV pilot
- 1997 Dante's Peak – 2nd Unit Director
- 1999 Fortress 2
- 2000 Race Against Time
- 2001 Blerta Revisited (documentary)
- 2001 The Lord of the Rings: The Fellowship of the Ring – 2nd Unit Director
- 2002 The Lord of the Rings: The Two Towers – 2nd Unit Director
- 2003 The Lord of the Rings: The Return of the King – 2nd Unit Director
- 2004 Spooked
- 2005 XXX: State of the Union – 2nd Unit Director
- 2009 Tales of Mystery and Imagination
