= Mary Woronov =

American actress and author

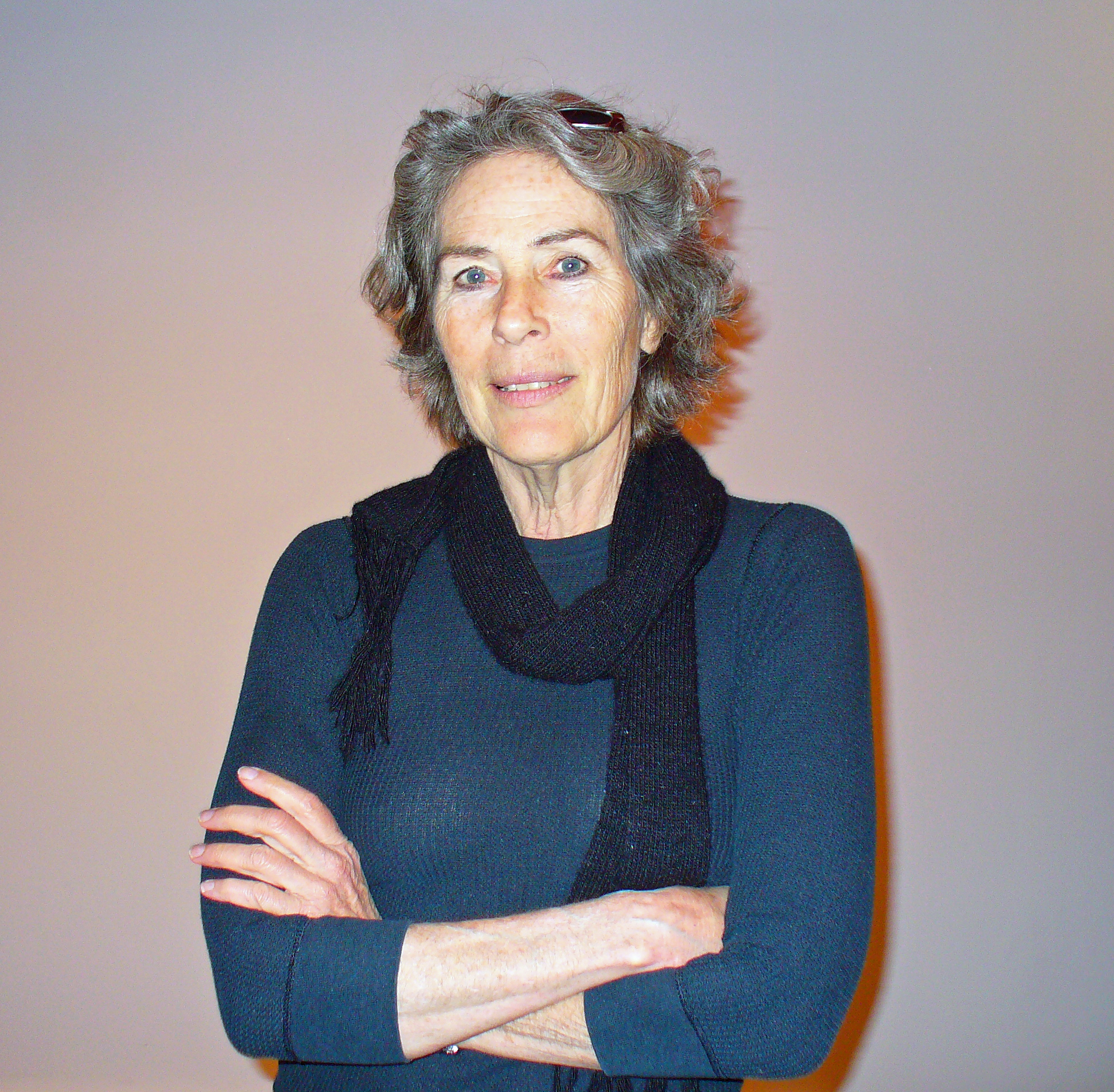
- Woronov in 2007
- Born: December 8, 1943 (age 82); Palm Beach, Florida, U.S.
- Other names: Mary Might; Mary Whitehead
- Occupations: Actress; writer; painter
- Years active: 1966–present
- Spouses: Theodore Gershuny (m. 1970; div. 1973) Fred Whitehead (m. 1976, divorced)

Mary Woronov (born December 8, 1943) is an American actress, writer, and figurative painter. She is primarily known as a cult film star because of her work with Andy Warhol and her roles in Roger Corman's cult films. Woronov has appeared in over 80 movies and on stage at Lincoln Center and off-Broadway productions as well as numerous times in mainstream American TV series, such as Charlie's Angels and Knight Rider. She frequently co-starred with friend Paul Bartel; the pair appeared in 17 films together, often playing a married couple.

== Early life ==
Woronov was born December 8, 1943, in the Breakers Hotel in Palm Beach, Florida, (Note: Some sources state Woronov was born in Brooklyn, New York; though this is where Woronov was primarily raised, she has stated in personal interviews that she was actually born at the Breakers Hotel in Palm Beach, Florida.) while it was temporarily operating as the Ream General Hospital during World War II. Woronov was born premature and doctors initially did not believe she would survive infancy.

At a young age, she relocated with her mother to Brooklyn Heights in New York City, where her mother married Victor D. Woronov, a Jewish cancer surgeon in 1949; they settled as a family and her stepfather legally adopted her. She has stated that she does not know the identity of her biological father. She has one younger half-brother, Victor, who was born on her eighth birthday.

Woronov studied art and sculpting at Cornell University, where she met and befriended artist Gerard Malanga in 1963.

== Acting career ==
=== 1966–1973: Early work and collaborations with Andy Warhol ===
Malanga, who was Andy Warhol's assistant at the time, asked Woronov if she would be in a movie he was making. Later, while on a Cornell-sponsored field trip to Manhattan-based artists, Woronov visited Warhol's art studio, The Factory. Woronov recalled Warhol was nowhere in sight: "I didn't know he was hiding in the staircase, but that's where he was." Malanga suggested Woronov stick around the studio, saying, "you should stay, they're doing a screen test."

She appeared in numerous films for Warhol, becoming a Warhol superstar in the 1960s. Warhol bestowed her the nickname "Mary Might" but she didn't like it. She danced with Exploding Plastic Inevitable, Warhol's multimedia presentation of The Velvet Underground, and played Hanoi Hannah in Chelsea Girls, the 1966 experimental underground film directed by Warhol. The film was Warhol's first major commercial success after a long line of avant-garde art films (both feature-length and short).

Of this time, she has said: "Of all the girls at Andy Warhol's Factory, I was the butch one. [Warhol] put me in his Screen Tests and I spent my nights at Max's Kansas City. ... I was the strong girl at the Factory." Further reflecting on her working relationship with Warhol, she commented in 2018: "I have a very dark side, I can't help it, but to me that period was wine and roses. It was darkness with pinpoints of light. My connection with Warhol was sort of like Lancelot's connection to King Arthur".

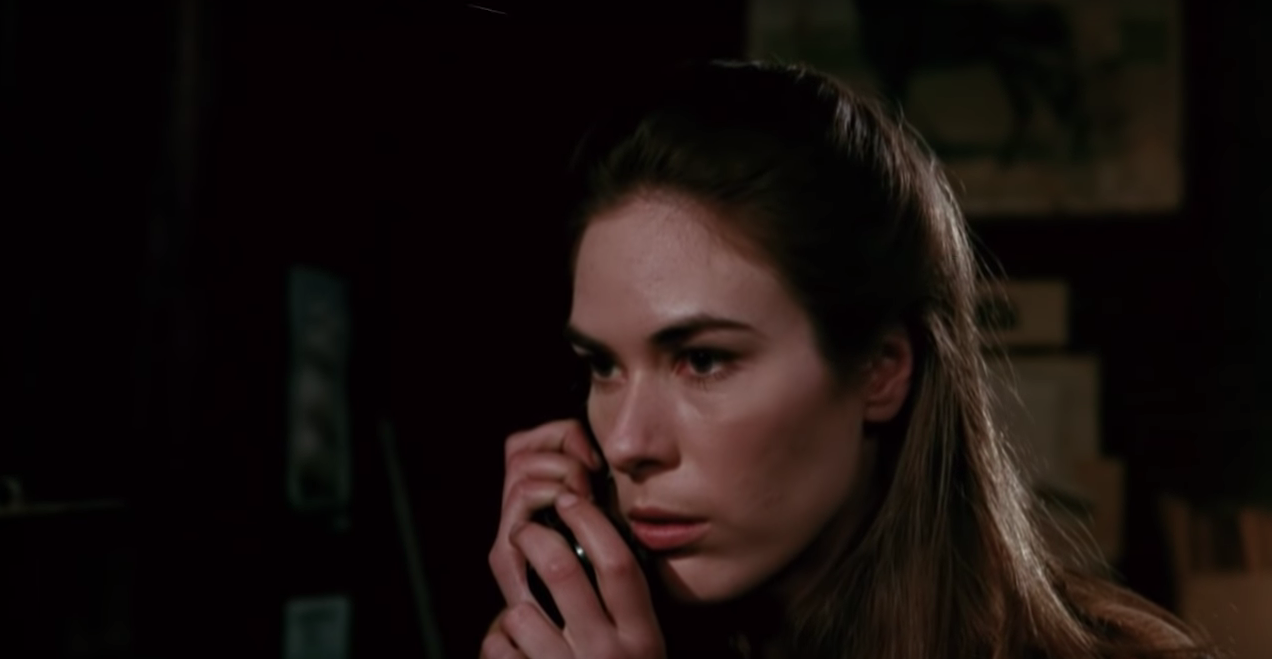
Woronov in Silent Night, Bloody Night (1972)

Between 1970 and 1972, Woronov starred in several films by her then-husband, Theodore Gershuny: Kemek (1970) Sugar Cookies (1973); and the slasher film Silent Night, Bloody Night (1972).

In 1973, Woronov was cast as understudy to Julie Newmar in the role of Susan in the Broadway production of David Rabe's play In the Boom Boom Room. Newmar was fired during rehearsals and Woronov took over the role, eventually earning a Theatre World Award for her performance. The production played November 8 - December 9, 1973, at Lincoln Center's Vivian Beaumont Theater.

Woronov's had a leading role in the Roger Corman-produced cult film Death Race 2000 (1975), followed by the Corman-produced Hollywood Boulevard (1976), directed by Allan Arkush and Joe Dante.

=== 1979–1990: Relocation to Los Angeles; further film roles ===
Woronov relocated from New York to Los Angeles in 1979, appearing in Rock 'n' Roll High School the same year. Her breakthrough role came in Paul Bartel's black comedy Eating Raoul (1982), in which she portrayed the wife of a Los Angeles want-to-be-restaurant owner (also played by Bartel), both of whom resort to robbing and murdering swingers to support their business ambitions. Six years later she and Bartel reprised the roles as cameos in Chopping Mall (1986).

She subsequently had roles in numerous films including Blood Theatre (1984), Night of the Comet (1984), and Nomads (1986). She became a fan of the Los Angeles punk music scene, and made an appearance with actor Jack Nance in the Suicidal Tendencies music video "Institutionalized" (1983); the two portrayed the protagonist's parents in the video. She later reprised this character in the band's music video for the song "Possessed To Skate" (1987).

Subsequent film roles include in Scenes from the Class Struggle in Beverly Hills (1989), Dick Tracy (1990), and Where Sleeping Dogs Lie (1991). On television, Woronov made guest appearances on numerous series in the 1980s, such as Logan's Run, Buck Rogers in the 25th Century, Charlie's Angels, Mr. Belvedere, Murder, She Wrote, Amazing Stories, St. Elsewhere, Wings, Babylon 5, Family Matters, and Highlander: The Series.

=== 1991–present: Later film performances ===
In 1991, Woronov reprised her role from Rock 'n' Roll High School in the sequel Rock 'n' Roll High School Forever. In 1995, she had a supporting role in the independent comedy film Glory Daze. In 1996, she appeared in the Soundgarden music video for the song Blow Up the Outside World (1996).

She later had roles in the animated Looney Tunes: Back in Action (2003), Rob Zombie's horror film The Devil's Rejects (2005) and Ti West's supernatural horror film The House of the Devil (2009).

She appeared in Barneys New York fall 2014 advertising campaign, "L.A. Stories", shot by Bruce Weber.

== Other works ==
=== Painting and visual art ===
Woronov has worked as a painter since her relocation to California in 1979. She has cited painter Francis Bacon as an influence on her artwork.

In February 2022, she held a retrospective exhibition, The Story of the Red Shoe, at the Palm Springs Cultural Center.

=== Writing ===
In 1995, Woronov published the memoir Swimming Underground: My Years in the Warhol Factory, reflecting on her time as part of Andy Warhol's Factory. She published her first novel, Snake, in 2000. She subsequently published a short story collection in 2004 entitled Blind Love.

== Personal life ==
Woronov married producer/director Theodore Gershuny in 1970, completing three films with him – Kemek (1970), Sugar Cookies (1973), and Silent Night, Bloody Night (1972) – before their divorce in 1973. She then married producer Fred Whitehead in 1976, later divorcing. Of Whitehead she said “we weren't very close and he married me because I looked good with the furniture.” She has been married two other times. One of her husbands was a race car driver. In 2022, she said she would not marry again.

Woronov has resided in Los Angeles, California since 1979.

== Filmography ==
Film
Year	Title	Role	Notes
1966	Chelsea Girls	Hanoi Hannah	
1966	Hedy	Policewoman	
1966	Kiss the Boot		
1966	Milk		Short film
1966	Shower		
1966	Superboy		
1966	The Beard	Jean Harlow	
1966	Since	John F. Kennedy	
1967	Four Stars		
1970	Kemek	Mary Wonderly	
1972	Silent Night, Bloody Night	Diane Adams	
1973	Sugar Cookies	Camilla Stone	
1974	Seizure	Mikki Hughes	
1975	Death Race 2000	Calamity Jane	
1975	Cover Girl Models	Diane	
1976	Hollywood Boulevard	Mary McQueen	
1976	Jackson County Jail	Pearl	
1976	Cannonball	Sandy Harris	
1976	Hollywood Man	Julie	
1977	Mr. Billion	Bit Part	Uncredited
1977	Bad Georgia Road	Hackett	
1978	The One and Only	Arlene	
1979	The Lady in Red	Woman Bankrobber	
1979	Rock 'n' Roll High School	Miss Togar	
1981	Heartbeeps	Party House Owner	
1982	Eating Raoul	Mary Bland	
1982	National Lampoon's Movie Madness	Secretary	
1983	Angel of H.E.A.T.	Samantha Vitesse	
1983	Get Crazy	Violetta	
1984	Blood Theatre	Miss Blackwell	
1984	Young Lust	Dr. Nicole Dunning	
1984	Night of the Comet	Audrey White	
1985	Get Out of My Room		
1985	Hellhole	Dr. Fletcher	
1986	Nomads	Dancing Mary	
1986	TerrorVision	Raquel Putterman	
1986	Chopping Mall	Mary Bland	
1987	Kappa		Short film
1987	Black Widow	Shelley	
1988	Mortuary Academy	Mary Purcell	
1989	Warlock	Channeler	
1989	Scenes from the Class Struggle in Beverly Hills	Lisabeth Hepburn-Saravian	
1989	Let It Ride	Quintella	
1990	Dick Tracy	Welfare Person	
1990	Club Fed	Jezebel	
1990	Watchers II	Dr. Glatman	
1991	Buster's Bedroom	Jane	
1991	Rock 'n' Roll High School Forever	Doctor Vadar	
1991	Motorama	Kidnapping Wife	
1991	Where Sleeping Dogs Lie	Woman Tourist	
1992	The Living End	Daisy	
1993	Good Girls Don't	Wilamena LaRue	
1993	Grief	Attorney	
1995	Number One Fan	Wedding Coordinator	
1995	Glory Daze	Vicki	
1998	Secrets of a Chambermaid	Felicity	
1998	Sweet Jane	Sales Lady	
1998	Mom, Can I Keep Her?	Dr. Klein	
1999	Zoo	Prunella	
1999	Invisible Mom II	Olivia	
2000	Straight Right	Dr. Wright	
2001	The Vampire Hunters Club	Receptionist	Short film
2001	The New Women	Lisa LaStrada	
2001	Perfect Fit	Mom	
2003	Prison A-Go-Go!	Dyanne She-Bitch Slutface	
2003	Looney Tunes: Back in Action	Acme Bad Ideas VP	
2004	The Halfway House	Sister Cecelia	
2004	Frog-g-g!	Doctor	
2004	I Pass for Human	Dr. Larraz	
2005	The Devil's Rejects	Abbie	
2009	The House of the Devil	Mrs. Ulman	
2009	Heaven Wants Out	Kitty	
2011	Kitchenette: Part One	Jo	
2012	Attack of the 50 Foot Cheerleader	House Mother	
2016	Snowbird	Today Theo	Short film
2016	A Flock of Birds	Ferida	Short film
2019	Frankenstein's Monster's Monster, Frankenstein	Nancy Erlich	Short film
2021	The Velvet Underground	Herself	Documentary

Music Videos
Year	Title	Artist	Role
1984	"Institutionalized"	Suicidal Tendencies	Mother
1993	"Institutionalized (Second Version)"	Suicidal Tendencies	Mother

Television
Year	Title	Role	Notes
1974	Somerset	Stephanie Dillard	TV series
1976	Charlie's Angels	Maxine	Episode: "Angels in Chains"
1977	Logan's Run	Irene Borden	Episode: "Capture"
1979	Taxi	Fran Strickland	Episode: "Nardo Loses Her Marbles"
1979	Mrs. Columbo	Inmate	Episode: "Off the Record"
1980	Buck Rogers in the 25th Century	Nola	Episode: "A Dream of Jennifer"
1980	Phyl & Mikhy	Anya	Episode: "Mikhy's Visitor"
1984	Hart to Hart	Clavell	Episode: "The Dog Who Knew Too Much"
1984	The Princess Who Had Never Laughed	Governess	TV movie
1985	Challenge of a Lifetime	Mary Garritee	TV movie
1985	A Bunny's Tale	Miss Renfro	TV movie
1985	Knight Rider	Dr. Von Furst	Episode: "Knight of the Juggernaut"
1985	Mr. Belvedere	Cheryl	Episode: "The Letter"
1985	Murder, She Wrote	Brady	Episode: "Jessica Behind Bars"
1986	Amazing Stories	Nurse	Episode: "Secret Cinema"
1986	Brothers	Sophia Santini	Episode: "The Seduction of Lou"
1986	St. Elsewhere		Episode: "Nothing Up My Sleeve"
1987	You Again?	Dr. Quinn	Episode: "Where the Sun Don't Shine"
1987	Shell Game	Bean Sweeney	Episode: "The Upstairs Gardner"
1987	Sledge Hammer!	Jill Taylor	Episode: "The Spa Who Loved Me"
1987	Webster	Carol	Episode: "San Francisco"
1988	Trial and Error	Officer Burdette	Episode: "Man's Best Friend"
1988	Monsters	Viki	Episode: "Pillow Talk"
1992	Parker Lewis Can't Lose	Officer Gwen	Episode: "Money Talks"
1993	Wings	Lydia Detmeir	Episode: "The Gift: Part 2"
1993	Flying Blind	Mona	4 episodes
1993	Acting on Impulse	Receptionist	TV movie
1994	Babylon 5	Ko D'ath	Episode: "Born to the Purple"
1994	Shake, Rattle and Rock!	E. Joyce Togar	TV movie
1994	My So-Called Life	Dr. Linda Shields	Episode: "Pressure"
1995	Highlander: The Series	Rita Luce	Episode: "They Also Serve"
1995	Here Come the Munsters	Mrs. Dimwitty	TV movie
1996	Family Matters	Mrs. Ramsay	Episode: "Swine Lake"
1996	The Munsters' Scary Little Christmas	Mrs. Dimwitty	TV movie
1999	Beyond Belief: Fact or Fiction	Motel Manager	Episode: "Get Your Kicks at Motel 66"
2000	Who's Watching Who?	Starring	TV movie
