= Vice Academy =

Vice Academy film series
- DVD collection of the first three films
- Directed by: Rick Sloane
- Written by: Rick Sloane
- Produced by: Rick Sloane
- Starring: Ginger Lynn Allen; Linnea Quigley; Elizabeth Kaitan; Raelyn Saalman; Jay Richardson; Jayne Hamil; Chad Gabbert; Mark Richardson
- Music by: Alan DerMarderosian
- Running time: 538 minutes (total)
- Country: United States
- Language: English

Vice Academy was a series of six comedy films, which aired on the USA Network throughout the 1990s, particularly on their Up All Night programming block. Created by director Rick Sloane of Hobgoblins fame, the cast included former porn star Ginger Lynn, scream queen Linnea Quigley, Elizabeth Kaitan and Julia Parton.

The films were intended as a sexy spoof-on-a-spoof of Charlie's Angels and the popular Police Academy movie series. The first film follows the three main girls as they train at the academy; the later films follow them on their assigned missions.

== Films ==
Film	Year	Director	Writer	Plot
Vice Academy	1989	Rick Sloane	Rick Sloane	The cadets infiltrate a porn operation and a prostitution ring, run by Queen Bee.
Vice Academy 2	1990	Rick Sloane	Rick Sloane	The girls battle Spanish Fly, who plans on spiking the city's water supply with a powerful aphrodisiac.
Vice Academy 3	1991	Rick Sloane	Rick Sloane	The cadets pursue Malathion, who is intent on crashing an Earth Day celebration.
Vice Academy 4	1995	Rick Sloane	Rick Sloane	Malathion escapes prison with a mission to destroy the wedding of the Police Commissioner and Devonshire.
Vice Academy 5	1996	Rick Sloane	Rick Sloane	A computer game character, the Virtual Reality Hooker, escapes to wreak havoc in reality.
Vice Academy 6	1998	Rick Sloane	Rick Sloane	A group of bikini bank robbers steal the academy's money as it's deposited at the local bank.

== Production ==
In the second film, Didi is promoted. Linnea Quigley would leave the series afterwards.

In the third film, Holly is in prison; shortly after production ended, Lynn was arrested for tax evasion and served 4½ months. It was also her last film in the series. Additionally, Elizabeth Kaitan joined the cast as Didi's younger sister, Candy. It is also the only installment in which Jayne Hamil does not appear as Devonshire, with Jordana Capra in her place.

The fifth film introduces Raelyn Saalman as Holly's younger sister, Traci.

== Reception ==
Critics were harsh on the films: Sandra Brennan of Allmovie said, "This tale wavers on the fine line between erotic comedy and soft-core porn with a definite leaning toward the latter." Sloane argues against this, saying that there's no sex and only ten seconds of nudity.

Critic Nathan Shumate commented, "Knowingly insipid to the point of being grotesque... It's a bad, bad, stupid movie, but somehow it fails to grossly offend, mainly because it doesn't try that hard."

=== Accolades ===
The first film has the distinction of winning USA Networks' B-Movie Awards for Best Picture and being their highest-rated late-night film when it first aired on cable television.

== Home media ==
The films were originally released on video by Prism Entertainment, then on individual DVDs by Madacy Entertainment and later in two box sets by Brentwood Communications.

The DVD releases have bonus material such as a making-of, trailers, interviews with Sloane and the cast, and a director's commentary.

All six films are available on streaming via the Tubi TV service.
