= Horror-of-demonic =

The horror-of-the-demonic film is one of three subgenres of the horror film that grew out of mid- and late-20th-century American culture.

== Characteristics ==
As described by the film aesthetician Charles Derry, the horror-of-the-demonic film suggested that the world was horrible because evil forces existed that were constantly undermining the quality of existence. The evil forces could either remain mere spiritual presences, as in Don't Look Now (Nicolas Roeg, 1973), or they could take the guise of witches, demons, or devils. "Films about witchcraft and ghosts have always been with us. Indeed, the idea of an evil incarnate has a long American tradition... The themes of repression and evil forces have long been a staple of American literature, from Nathaniel Hawthorne's The House of Seven Gables and Washington Irving's "The Legend of Sleepy Hollow" to Edgar Allan Poe's 'The Raven' and Henry James' The Turn of the Screw."

Derry cites two films as "the most important forerunners in this genre": Day of Wrath (Carl Dreyer, Denmark, 1943) and The Devil's Wanton (Ingmar Bergman, Sweden, 1948), although Derry qualifies the second film as "not a horror film".

== Themes ==
Four themes that are common to these films lend a consistency to this genre.

- The idea of vengeance, noted especially in The Haunted Palace (Roger Corman, 1963), Horror Hotel (John Moxey, 1960), and The Exorcist (William Friedkin, 1973)
- The corruption of innocence, noted in The Other (Robert Mulligan, 1972), Rosemary's Baby (Roman Polanski, 1968), The Exorcist, The Witches aka The Devil's Own (Cyril Frankel, 1966), Don't Look Now (Nicolas Roeg, 1973), and The Mephisto Waltz (Paul Wendkos, 1971)
- Mystic phenomena, especially possession, noted in The Mephisto Waltz, Burn, Witch, Burn (Sidney Hayers, 1962), The Other, Rosemary's Baby, The Possession of Joel Delaney (Waris Hussein, 1972), The Innocents (Jack Clayton, 1961), and The Exorcist.
- The emphasis on Christian symbology, noted in Horror Hotel, Rosemary's Baby, The Other, Don't Look Now, The Exorcist, Burn, Witch, Burn, The Haunted Palace (Roger Corman, 1963), Witchcraft (William J. Hole Jr, 1962), Diary of a Madman (Reginald LeBorg, 1963), and the "Morella" segment of Tales of Terror (Roger Corman, 1962).
