= Horror-of-personality =

Horror-of-personality is a specific sub-category of horror and thriller genres; as opposed to excessive violence or the presence of malevolent supernatural beings, such stories evoke horror and/or suspense through villains who are perfectly human, but possess horrific personalities. They usually focus on Freudian psychology, as well as the cause and effect of profound insanity. Each narrative will either document an unbalanced person's descent into madness, or else follow somebody on the trail of a murderous psychopath. The settings are often deceptively ordinary, such as cheerful suburban homes or shabby hotels.

Examples include the stories of Patricia Highsmith and Edgar Allan Poe, as well as classic films like Psycho and What Ever Happened to Baby Jane?

== See also ==
- Psychological horror
- Psychological thriller
