= Hobgoblins (film) =

1988 film by Rick Sloane

- Theatrical release poster
- Directed by: Rick Sloane
- Written by: Rick Sloane
- Produced by: Rick Sloane
- Starring: Tom Bartlett; Paige Sullivan; Steven Boggs; Kelley Palmer; Billy Frank; Daran Norris
- Cinematography: Rick Sloane
- Edited by: Rick Sloane
- Music by: Alan DerMarderosian
- Distributed by: American Cinema Marketing
- Release date: July 14, 1988
- Running time: 92 minutes
- Country: United States
- Language: English
- Budget: $15,000

Hobgoblins is a 1988 American low-budget independent comedy horror film directed, written, and produced by Rick Sloane, who also served as cinematographer and editor. The plot concerns small, often considered cheaply designed and made hobgoblins (small demon-like mythical and goblin-like creatures).

Often seen as a rip-off of "every small monster movie," but mainly Gremlins, the film is generally considered to be of exceptionally poor quality and has come to be regarded as one of the worst films ever made. It has become a cult film because of its poor quality, and received infamy after it was featured on Mystery Science Theater 3000.

== Plot ==
The film opens with a security guard named Dennis investigating a deserted film vault at an old movie studio. While inside, his fantasy of being a rock star comes to life, but he dies while performing on stage. His boss, Mr. McCreedy (Jeffrey Culver), closes the door upon discovering the body.

A young man named Kevin (Tom Bartlett) takes the now-vacant job so that he can impress his girlfriend, Amy (Paige Sullivan). Upon arriving home after his first shift, he finds that his two friends, the sex-crazed Daphne (Kelley Palmer) and the dorky Kyle (Steven Boggs), are waiting for him along with Amy. Daphne's Army boyfriend Nick (Billy Frank) also arrives. Nick and Kevin spar with a rake and a garden hoe in a long, protracted, repetitive scene. After Kevin loses horribly, Amy berates him for his weaknesses while Daphne and Nick have sex in Nick's van.

While in pursuit of a burglar the next evening, Kevin stumbles across the vault, which is revealed to contain a small group of hairy, demonic little aliens — the hobgoblins, who subsequently escape, leaving Kevin stunned. His boss, the elderly Mr. McCreedy, explains that the hobgoblins crash-landed on the studio lot decades earlier, and he has been closely guarding them ever since. The hobgoblins have the hypnotic power to make a person's wildest fantasies come true; however, they also kill their victims in the process when people's fantasies turn against them.

The hobgoblins go straight to Kevin's house, where his friends are partying, as they are attracted by the bright lights. The hobgoblins quickly make their fantasies come true, but with dire consequences. The quiet, prudish Amy's fantasy leads her to the sleazy nightclub, Club Scum, where it turns out that Amy's deepest fantasy is to lose her sexual inhibitions and be a stripper. Kevin and the others follow her there.

The nightclub erupts into chaos while Kevin and his friends try to kill the rampaging hobgoblins. Nick is given a fantasy in which he leads a commando raid. In the melee, Nick is set on fire by a hand grenade thrown by his commanding officer and is apparently killed (again, his fantasy goes to extremes and turns against him), though he returns later in the movie, bandaged and on crutches, but otherwise unharmed. Kevin kills the hobgoblin in control of Amy before she can have sex with the scruffy bouncer, Roadrash (Duane Whitaker). Although Amy is restored to her original personality, her experience leaves her less sexually repressed than she was before.

Thinking that all the hobgoblins are dead, Kevin, Amy, Kyle, and Daphne return to the studio lot to report back to Mr. McCreedy. Kevin is confronted by the burglar from earlier that night, and beats him in a fight, finally proving his bravery to Amy. Kevin's victory, however, is short-lived, as the burglar is revealed as yet another phantom created by the hobgoblins. As he pulls a gun from an ankle holster and aims it at Kevin, Mr. McCreedy shoots the controlling hobgoblin, thus saving Kevin's life. The remaining hobgoblins run back into the vault, which McCreedy has filled with explosives. The hobgoblins are then blown to pieces. Amy promises to have sex with Kevin, Nick returns to have sex with Daphne, and Kyle, the odd man out, asks to use McCreedy's phone, presumably for more phone sex.

== Cast ==
- Tom Bartlett as Kevin
- Paige Sullivan as Amy
- Steven Boggs as Kyle
- Kelley Palmer as Daphne
- Billy Frank as Nick
- Tamara Clatterbuck as Fantazia
- Duane Whitaker as Roadrash
- Jeffrey Culver as McCreedy
- Kevin Kildow as Dennis
- Kari French as Pixie
- Daran Norris as Club Scum M.C
- James Mayberry as Sergeant Parker
- Ken Abraham as Thug
- Don Barrett as Comstock
- Cole Coonce as Fontanelles—Guitar

== Release ==
=== Home media ===
- First released on VHS in early 1988.
- The MST3K version of the film was released by Rhino Home Video as part of the Collection, Volume 8 DVD set which was re-released by Shout Factory (see below for more information).
- The original Hobgoblins cast members reunited for the MicroWerks DVD of Hobgoblins and Hobgoblins 2, released June 23, 2009. The 20th Anniversary interviews are given by Tom Bartlett (Kevin), Kelley Palmer (Daphne), Steven Boggs (Kyle), Billy Frank (Nick), Tami Clatterbuck (Fantazia), Daran Norris (Club Scum MC), Kenneth J. Hall (creator of the original Hobgoblin puppets), and Rick Sloane (writer/director).
- Hobgoblins was also hosted by Elvira, Mistress of the Dark in 2014, as part of 13 Nights of Elvira, an all-new series produced for Hulu by Brainstorm Media.
- Released on Blu-ray on October 25, 2016.

== Reception and legacy ==
While talking to Dread Central in a 2009 interview, Sloane was asked about the movie's position on the IMDb Bottom 100. He said he was "surprised it slipped down to #25. While the film was airing on the Sci Fi Channel, Hobgoblins had climbed to the #2 spot, right behind Gigli. My biggest fear is that it may drop below #100 and become forgotten."

=== Mystery Science Theater 3000 ===
Hobgoblins is perhaps best known for being shown on episode #907 of Mystery Science Theater 3000. The episode debuted June 27, 1998, on the Sci-Fi Channel. MST3K writer Paul Chaplin called watching the movie "torture", with Hobgoblins at "the top of the list of the worst movies we've ever done." After listing the characters in the movie, Chaplin writes, the actors playing them had two things in common: "They can't act and I don't care about them."

Paste writer Jim Vorel ranked the episode as one of the series's best, putting it at #17 out of 191 total MST3K episodes. Vorel says Hobgoblins is "rightly cited as one of the most inept movies ever" on MST3K. He writes, "I find its haplessness both charming and inherently watchable ... This film is just SO cheap, ... The whole film feels like something written by a guy desperately trying to be edgy, but with a 10-year-old’s conception of what 'scum' might actually look like." In an article at Vulture, writer Courtney Enlow lists Hobgoblins as one of the series' 25 essential episodes. A Den of Geek article lists the episode as one of the thirteen best MST3K featuring a horror movie,. Chris Morgan includes the titular hobgoblins as the worst monsters in MST3K history, calling them "some of the worst looking, most unrealistic puppets you will ever see. ...Everything about the hobgoblins is stupid, but delightfully stupid." Morgan also places the movie among the ten worst films featured on MST3K due to a combination of bad special effects, "bad acting and nonsense plot."

The MST3K version of the film was released by Rhino Home Video as part of the Mystery Science Theater 3000 Collection, vol. 8 DVD set. It was re-released by Shout Factory on November 15, 2018. The other episodes in the four-disc set include Monster a Go-Go (episode #421), The Phantom Planet (episode #902), and The Dead Talk Back (episode #603).

Hobgoblins was also mocked by RiffTrax Live, a venture by three MST3K writers / performers, on October 15, 2021.

== See also ==
- List of 20th century films considered the worst
- Exploitation film
- Postmodernist film
- Postmodern horror
